= Vittoria Plain =

Area in Sicily, Italy

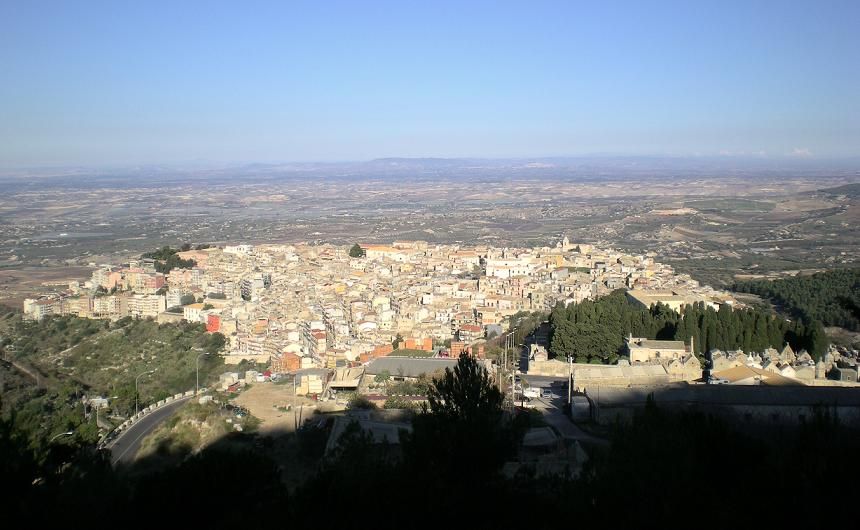
The plain seen from Chiaramonte Gulfi

The Vittoria Plain, also called Ipparino, is a broad and sweeping plain which makes up the western part of the province of Ragusa in Sicily.

== Geography ==
The Vittoria plain has an extension of appr. 420 km² and is bounded on the south-west by the Mediterranean Sea, on the east by the Hyblean Mountains and on the north-west by the river Dirillo and the low hills of Mazzarrone. It rises to an altitude of 245 m (803 ft), with an average elevation of perhaps 100 m (330 ft). The climate can be uncomfortably hot in the summer, with temperatures of 40 °C being common. The rainfall on the plain is significantly lower than in the mountains. The main rivers are the Dirillo running on the north and the Ippari running on the southern part. In the plain there is also another river, the Rifriscolaro.

== Population ==
The main city is Vittoria lying on the western part of the plain. Other towns on the plain are Comiso and Acate.

== Agricultural cultivations ==
It is one of the most important agricultural areas in southern Italy given the presence of numerous farms dedicated to serriculture that supply the Vittoria fruit and vegetable market, which is among the largest and most important in Italy and Europe. In addition to fruit and leaf vegetables, grown in the western part of the plain, there are agriculture citrus fruit with the cultivation of aranci and lemons in the central part and l 'olive growing and viticulture in the eastern part.

== See also ==
Plain of Catania
