= Monte Lauro =

Mountain in Italy

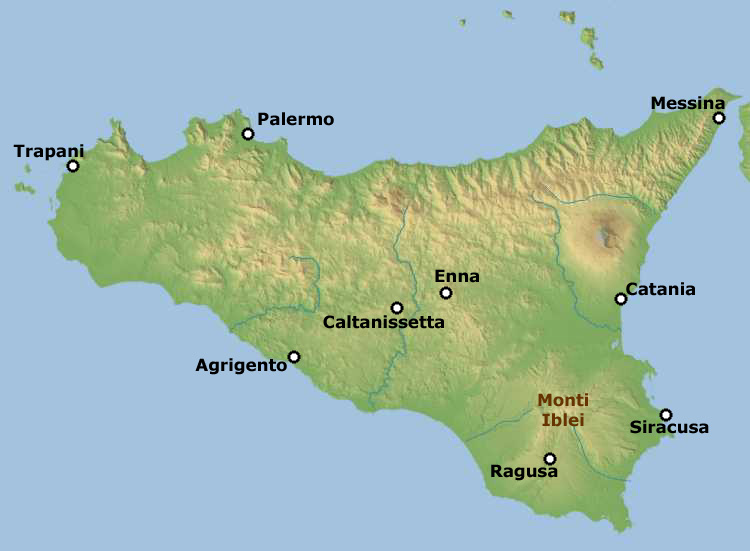
- Location of Monte Lauro in Sicily

Highest point
- Elevation: 986 m (3,235 ft)
- Prominence: 553 m (1,814 ft)
- Isolation: 60.44 km (37.56 mi)
- Coordinates: 37°07′1.1058″N 14°49′10.614″E

Geography
- Location within Italy
- Location: Ragusa/Syracuse, Italy
- Parent range: Hyblaean Mountains

Climbing
- Easiest route: Mountain walk from the road at Buscemi.

Mount Lauro is a mountain reaching 986 metres located in south-eastern Sicily belonging to the chain of Hyblaean Mountains, stretching between the three provinces of Catania, Ragusa and Siracusa. Monte Lauro is part of a complex of extinct volcanoes having formed under the sea during the Miocene epoch.

Its slopes currently host more than 2330 hectares of Mediterranean coniferous forests, extending into the territories of Buccheri, Buscemi, Chiaramonte Gulfi, Ferla, Giarratana, Licodia Eubea, Monterosso Almo, Vizzini, and Carlentini. Many rivers originate there, including the 'Ánapo, Dirillo, and Irminio.

Mount Lauro's name apparently derives from the Latin laurus (laurel), as in the past many laurel trees grew there.

Due to the fact that it is the highest mountain in the area, numerous radio and television transmitters are located near its peaks.

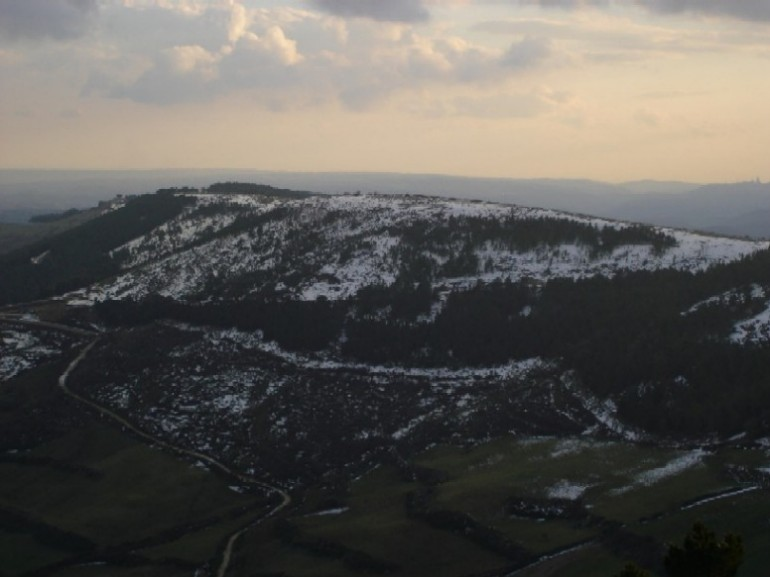
Monte Lauro – snow-capped
