= Mazzarrone (grape) =

Variety of grape

- Grape (Vitis)
- Species: Vitis vinifera
- Also called: Uva di Mazzarrone
- Origin: Sicily

Mazzarrone is a Sicilian variety of table grapes, characterized by sweet bulbs of considerable size. It is cultivated in the area between the municipal territories of Mazzarrone, Caltagirone and Licodia Eubea (in the province of Catania) and Acate, Chiaramonte Gulfi and Comiso (in the province of Ragusa).

The grape is produced in the white, red and black types and it has Protected Geographical Indication status under European Union law.
