= Casmenae =

Ancient settlement in Sicily

- Kasmenai, Casmene
- Location within Italy
- 37°4′40″N 14°49′53″E
- Type: Settlement
- Periods: Archaic Greek
- Cultures: Ancient Greece
- Location: Buscemi, Italy

History
- Built: 644 BC
- Abandoned: Approximately 4th century BC

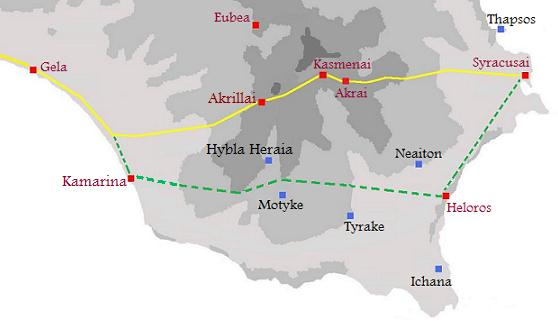
South-east Sicily in the 5th century BC with the Greek cities in red and the Native settlements in blue. The Via Selinuntina in yellow and the Via Elorina in green.

Casmenae or Kasmenai (Ancient Greek: Κασμένη or Κασμέναι, Casmene in Italian) was an ancient Greek colony of Magna Graecia located on the Hyblaean Mountains, founded in 644 BC by the Syracusans at a strategic position for the control of central Sicily. It was also intended as a military forward-position on the Via Selinuntina road that connected Syracuse to Akragas (modern-day Agrigento) - also on that road were Gela and Akrillai to Casmenae's west and Akrai to its east. Destroyed by the Romans in 212 BC, Casmenae was abandoned during the 3rd century BC and never inhabited again.

The site was discovered by the Sicilian archeologist Paolo Orsi during the first half of the 20th century, after he had identified the most probable site at Monte Casale in Buscemi at 830 m (2,720 ft) above sea level, on an extinct volcano near Monte Lauro, 7 km (4.3 mi) from Giarratana and 12 km (7.5 mi) from Palazzolo Acreide. Remains of the defensive walls, 3.4 km (2.1 mi) long, are still visible along with the base of one of the temples and some dwellings.

== Historical origins ==
It was founded in 643 BC from Syracuse, 90 years after Syracuse's own foundation in 734 or 733 BC. There are several references to it in the historical sources, though few links to the main figures of the time and with several false accounts added. The most reliable source for it is Thucydides and his History of the Peloponnesian War. He writes:

Acrae and Casmenae were founded by the Syracusans; Acrae seventy years after Syracuse, Casmenae nearly twenty after Acrae. Camarina was first founded by the Syracusans, close upon a hundred and thirty-five years after the building of Syracuse; its founders being Daxon and Menecolus. But the Camarinaeans being expelled by arms by the Syracusans for having revolted, Hippocrates, tyrant of Gela, some time later receiving their land in ransom for some Syracusan prisoners, resettled Camarina, himself acting as its founder. Lastly, it was again depopulated by Gelo, and settled once more for the third time by the Geloans.

The most reliably-attested events related to the city are as follows; perhaps in 553 BC, it fought alongside Syracuse against Camarina and the Siculi; there were also some Syracusan exiles, then brought back to Syracuse by Gelo in 485 BC; Dion landed at Heraclea Minoa and chose troops to lead against Syracuse. The city was abandoned around the end of the 4th century BC, with gradual Syracusan decadence, hence the relatively undisturbed nature of the site. To the south of ancient Casmene, on the site now known as "Terravecchia", is the former site of Giarratana (Jarratana), abandoned by its inhabitants in 1693.

== Archaeological remains ==
The city walls, important for their military and strategic function and 3.4 km (2.1 mi) long, are interspersed with rectangular towers and contain a unique city plan. This is solely made up of 38 parallel streets, all in a north-south direction. All the evidence suggests that Kasmenai (in the plural) was the name for a grouping of quarters. Arrows, daggers and spears have been found in the area, and basalt blocks still emerge from the earth – these blocks formed mills in the ancient city. Among the excavated remains are four houses and a temple that already existed before the settlers' arrival - the latter has polychromatic ceramic decoration and, judging by the several weapons found in it, associated with a warrior god.

== See also ==
- List of ancient Greek cities

== Sources ==
- Istituto Geografico de Agostini, Sicilia archeologica
