= Capuliato =

Condiment of Sicilian cuisine

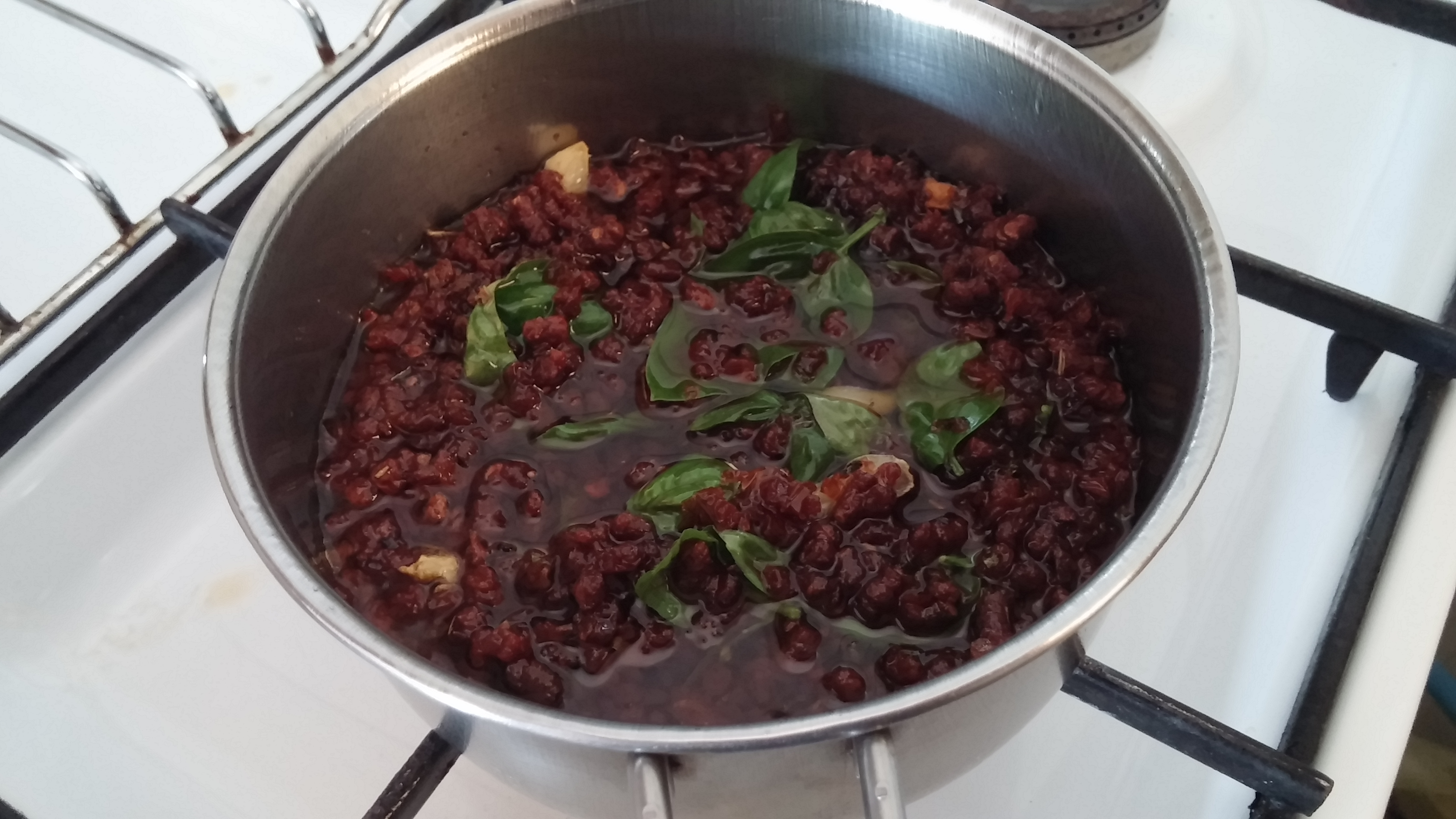
- Alternative names: Capuliatu (in Sicilian)
- Type: Condiment
- Place of origin: Italy
- Region or state: Sicily
- Serving temperature: Hot or warm
- Main ingredients: Tomatoes, basil, garlic, chili pepper, extra virgin olive oil

Capuliato, or capuliatu in the Sicilian language, is a traditional condiment of Sicilian cuisine based on dried tomatoes, linked, in particular to the territory of the Vittoria Plain, in the free municipal consortium of Ragusa. The original name is capuliato, meaning 'minced'.

== History ==
Initially in Europe the tomato was used as an ornamental plant and it was only in the 19th century that it spread on a gastronomic level.

It is agreed that the capuliato (when referring to the dish as spaghettata and not as a condiment, usually, it is also called capuliata) was born and spread from Vittoria, Sicily, where since its origins the area was easily exploitable on an agricultural level.

Among the areas of diffusion of the product, Vittoria has always been seen as having the greatest production and tradition of the tomato. The city of Vittoria is home to the largest fruit and vegetable markets in Italy and the most important in Italy and Europe for tomatoes. Its only hamlet (frazione) is the seaside locality of Scoglitti. However, the territory is very large and, in addition to the urban area, it has 45 different contrade, mostly used for greenhouse cultivation.

Capuliato was developed when the methods of preserving tomato sauce and greenhouse cultivation of the latter were in their infancy. The recipe quickly spread to other areas of the province and nearby Gela. As the tomatoes were not available in the winter, they were sun dried and processed in the warm months, usually July and August, and then conserved to season the pasta and bread throughout the year.

== Preparation and use ==
The tomatoes are first washed, then cut, salted, and dried in the sun. Subsequently they are ground, usually with a meat grinder, and generally placed in oil, in a marinade that provides basil or oregano and other flavors in addition depending on the tastes. Capuliato is mainly used to season pasta, bread or bruschetta, but also to flavor the stuffed focaccia typical of the Ragusano cheese, the scaccia.

== Most common recipes ==
The classic pasta con capuliato includes garlic, extra virgin olive oil, and capuliato, with the addition of basil or parsley at the end (elements that, however, once were not easily available in winter). It can be enriched with fried breadcrumbs, grated cheese, and other condiments. Long pasta is indicated; the classic spaghetti n° 5 is usually cooked. The bread is filled with capuliato, extra virgin olive oil, and ingredients such as cheese, oregano or basil, anchovies, and chili pepper.

== Industrial production ==
There are now several manufacturing companies, especially in Vittoria, the home of the capuliato, thanks to which the product is easily available in delicatessens or supermarkets throughout Sicily, especially in the south-east. The tradition of homemade production still remains strong.

== See also ==
- Sicilian cuisine
- List of condiments
- Sun-dried tomato
