= Monte Raci =

Mountain in Italy

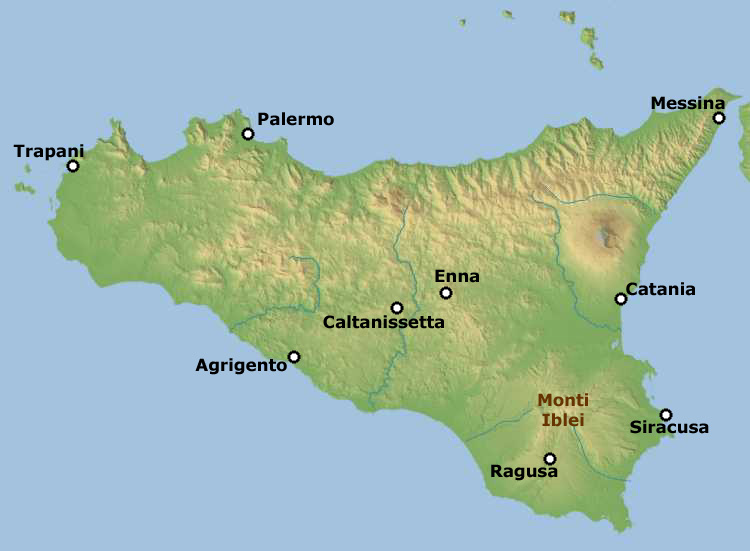
- Location of Monte Raci

Highest point
- Elevation: 610 m (2,000 ft)
- Coordinates: 36°58′28.29″N 14°40′13.92″E

Geography
- Location: Province of Ragusa, Italy
- Parent range: Hyblaean Mountains

Climbing
- Easiest route: Mountain walk from the road SS.514.

Monte Raci is a mountain reaching 610 metres located in the Sicilian province of Ragusa and is one of the Hyblaen chain. It is located in the Chiaramonte Gulfi commune. Due to its rounded shape, Monte Raci has been the subject of many photographers and advertising materials.

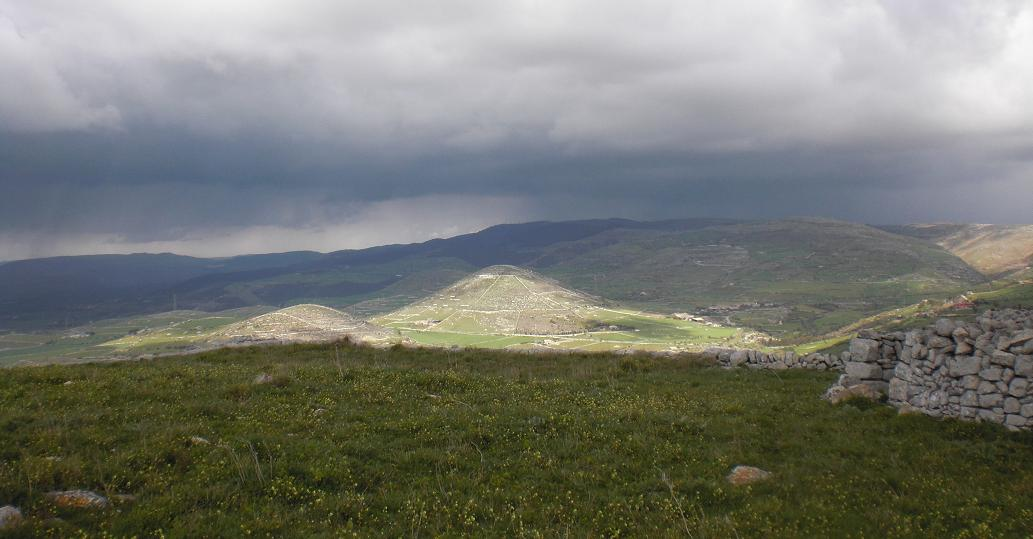
Monte Raci highlighted in the sun with Monte Racello to the left
