= Akrillai =

Ancient Sicilian city and archeological site

Coordinates: 37°01′N 14°42′E

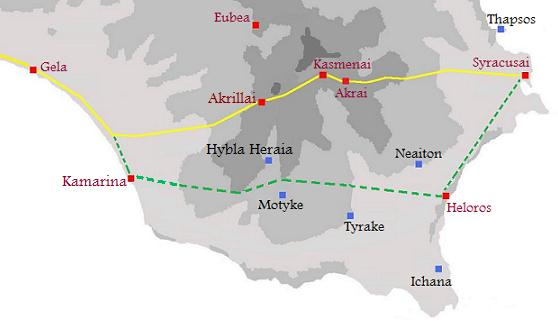
South-east Sicily and the Greek cities in red and the Native settlements in blue. The Via Selinuntina in yellow and the Via Elorina in green.

Akrillai (Ancient Greek: Ἄκριλλαι) and Akrilla (Ancient Greek: Ἄκριλλα), Acrillae (in Latin) was an ancient Greek colony of Magna Graecia located in the modern province of Ragusa, Sicily, Italy, where the town of Chiaramonte Gulfi stands today. The ruins of the old colony can be found in the contrada (quarter) Piano del Conte-Morana and Piano Grillo. A necropolis dating from the 6th-5th century BC has been identified in the contrada Paraspola-Pirruna.

The name appears in different forms among different authors: Akrilla, Akrille; in ancient sources: Akrillaiu; the name is variously written by Latin writers Acrilla and Acrille.

== History ==
=== Hellenic era ===
The city was founded by the Corinthian and Syracusan colonists at the same time of Kamarina (598 BC), overlooking the Valley of the Hipparis to establish their power against the city of Gela, founded by a Cretan-Rhodian effort. Akrillai was also a road-station on the route from Syracuse to Gela and Akragas. By passing via Akrai and Kasmenai, the road avoided the low Hyblaean Mountains and Hybla Heraea.

The city based its economy on trade, thanks to its strategic position along the Via Selinuntina. Near to Akrillai was the Hellenistic settlement of Scornavacche, where recent excavations have found several clay ovens. Throughout its existence Akrillai remained under the influence of the mother-city Syracuse, with which it was allied. According to the Roman historian Titus Livius, the city was used as a fortress and military base during the Carthaginians' second Sicilian campaign. In 406 BC, after the fall of Akragas and Gela, the city was destroyed for the first time, as the Carthaginians passed on their way to attack and besiege Syracuse.

=== Roman Acrillae ===
Titus Livius also recounts the battle fought at Akrillai in 213 BC between Syracusan forces guided by the strategos Hippokrates, and the Roman army led by the consul Marcus Claudius Marcellus:

One night in 213 BC, whilst the city of Syracuse was under siege by the Romans, the Syracusan army managed to find an unguarded passage between the Roman lines. Epicides, brother of Hippokrates, was left to guard the city, whilst his brother took the army to Akrillai and prepared to counter attack the Romans. The consul Marcello, marching towards Akrillai from Akragas, arrived at the colony to find the Syracusan army busy establishing their camp. The consul, strong from months of preparation against the Carthaginians, ordered the attack and the Syracusan army, disorientated and unarmed, was divided from its cavalry and commanders. Powerless in this situation, Hippokrates was forced to take refuge in Akrai.

With the defeat of Hippokrates’ Syracusans, the city of Akrillai became part of the Roman province of Sicily, its name Latinized as Acrillae.

=== Arab Gulfi ===
In 827 AD the town was destroyed again, this time by the Arabs of Asad ibn al-Furat. The name Acrillae disappeared and the rebuilt centre was known by the Arab name of Gulfi, which means "the rose-garden" and "place rich with vegetation". The nearby river Dirillo also takes its name from Acrillae: called Achates (agate) during the Greek-Roman era and said to be where agates were first found, in Arab times the river was called Wadi Ikrilu (River of Acrille).

== Excavations ==
Akrillai was discovered by the historian Corrado Melfi and identified by the archaeologist Antonino Di Vita, an academic of the Lincei, who conducted several campaigns of excavation. The many findings are housed in the Hyblean Archaeological Museum of Ragusa and in the Regional Archeological Museum of Syracuse.

== See also ==
- List of ancient Greek cities
