= Melfi (disambiguation) =

Melfi is a city in Basilicata, Italy.

Melfi may also refer to:

== People ==
- Corrado Melfi, an Italian historian and archaeologist
- Giuseppe Melfi, an Italo-Swiss mathematician
- John Melfi, a United States–based television and movie producer
- Leonard Melfi, an American playwright and actor
- Mary Melfi, a Canadian writer
- Theodore Melfi, an American screenwriter, film director, and producer

== Toponyms ==
- Melfi, Chad

== Other ==
- Melfi Family, a family that ruled Melfi as Dukes and obtained other titles in the south of Italy
- Jennifer Melfi, a fictional character on the American television drama series The Sopranos
- The Prince of Melfi, an Italian noble title

MELFI may refer to:

- Minus Eighty Degree Laboratory Freezer for ISS
