= Lago di Santa Rosalia =

Lake in Sicily, Italy

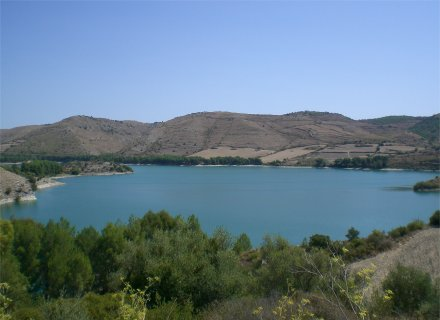

- Location within Sicily
- Location: Province of Ragusa, Sicily
- Coordinates: 36°58′30″N 14°46′33″E
- Type: artificial
- Primary inflows: Irminio
- Primary outflows: Irminio
- Basin countries: Italy
- Max. length: 3,900 m (12,800 ft)
- Max. width: 600 m (2,000 ft)
- Surface area: 1.45 km^{2} (0.56 sq mi)
- Average depth: 17.0 m (55.8 ft)
- Max. depth: 39.3 m (129 ft)
- Water volume: 24.7×10^{6} m^{3} (20,000 acre⋅ft)
- Surface elevation: 382.0 m (1,253.3 ft) a.s.l.
- Islands: none
- Settlements: Giarratana at 6.3 km (3.9 mi), Ragusa at 7.5 km (4.7 mi)

Lago di Santa Rosalia is an artificial lake in the Province of Ragusa, Sicily, Italy. The Lago di Santa Rosalia is the only lake of the province of Ragusa.

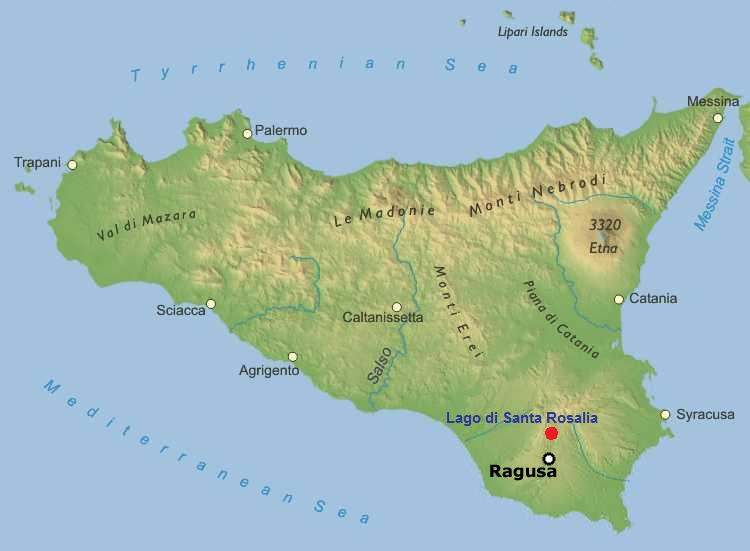
Location of the lake.

== Dam ==
The lake was created following the completion of building works of a dam 57,10m tall along the higher part of the course of the river Irminio, between the towns of Ragusa and Giarratana. Works started the 10 November 1976 and were completed in 1983. The water reservoir was created for agricultural use but is also used for recreational fishing.
