= Monte Casale =

Mountain in Italy

Coordinates: 37°05′47″N 14°49′17″E

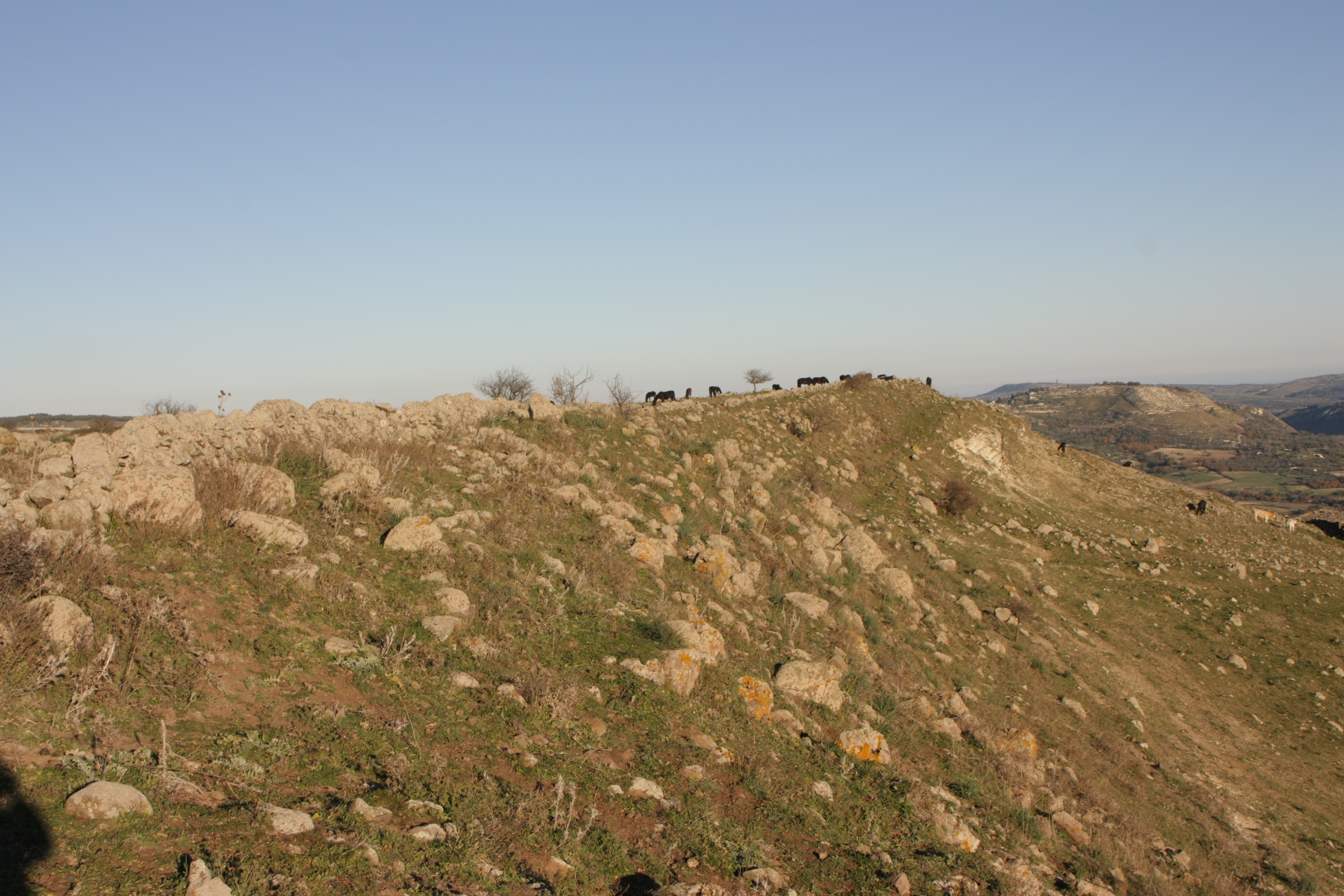
View of the summit of Monte Casale

Monte Casale is a mountain in Sicily, Italy, reaching about 911 m above sea level., which, together with the neighbouring Monte Lauro, is part of the ancient volcanic complex of the Hyblaean Mountains. Their peaks form the boundary between the present-day provinces of Syracuse and Ragusa and the watershed between the Irminio and Anapo rivers. It is notable for its important archaeological remains, discovered by Paolo Orsi early in the 20th century and identified by him with the ancient Greek city of Casmene.
