= Anapo =

River in Sicily

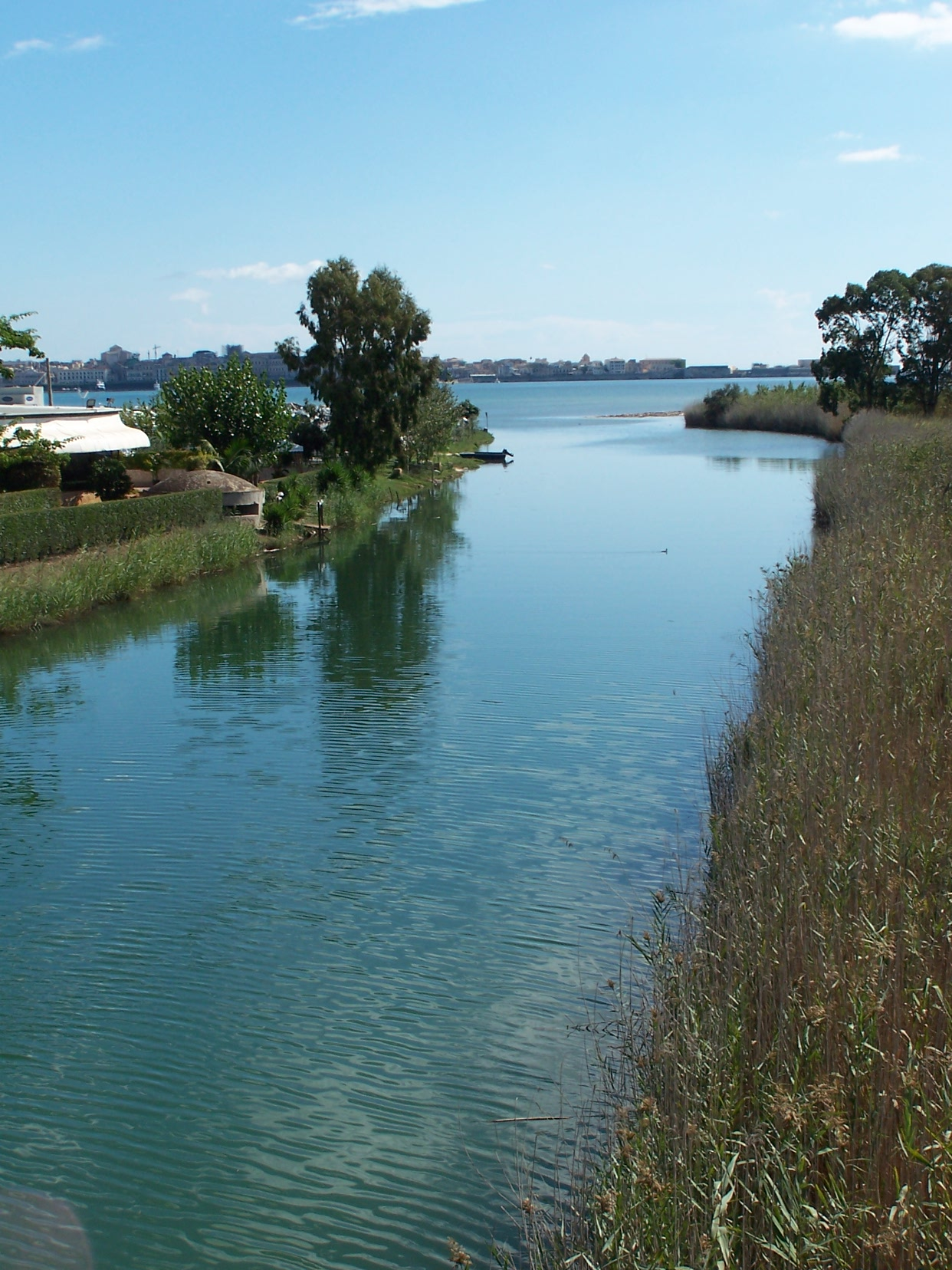
- The river's mouth

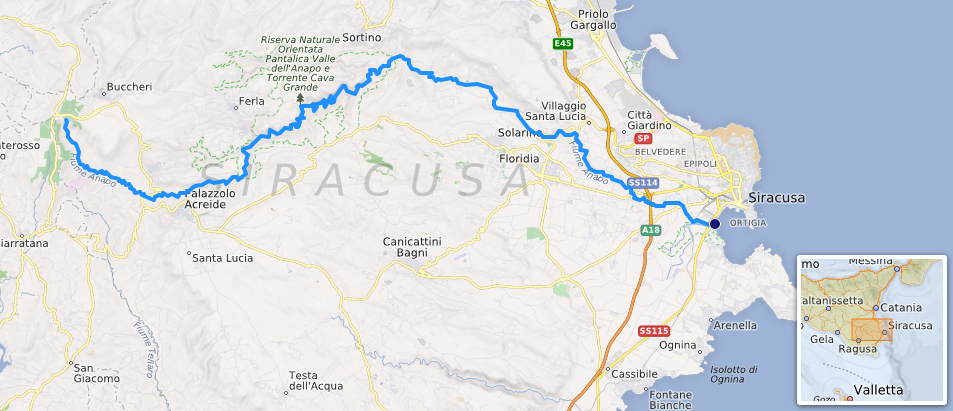

Location
- Country: Italy

Physical characteristics
- Source: Monte Lauro
  - elevation: 986 m (3,235 ft)
- Mouth: Ionian Sea
  - coordinates: 37.0552°N 15.2703°E
- Length: 40 km (25 mi)

The Anapo (Sicilian: Ànapu) is a river in Sicily whose ancient Greek name is similar to the word for "swallowed up" and at many points on its course it runs underground. The Greek myth of Anapus is associated with it.

The river springs from the Monte Lauro in the Hyblaean Mountains (hills), on the territory of Buscemi, crossing the whole territory of Syracuse, where it flows into the Ionian Sea together with the Ciane. Historically, its waters were used to feed the aqueduct of Syracuse, built in 480 BC by the tyrant Gelo and running for 22 kilometres (14 mi). Its waters now power the hydroelectric station near Solarino.

During the 6th century BC, a large stone temple to Zeus Olympios was erected along the Anapo, 3 kilometres (1.9 mi) outside Syracuse. It measured around 20.5 by 60 metres (67 by 197 ft), and was one of the first Magna Graecian peripteral temples composed wholly of stone.

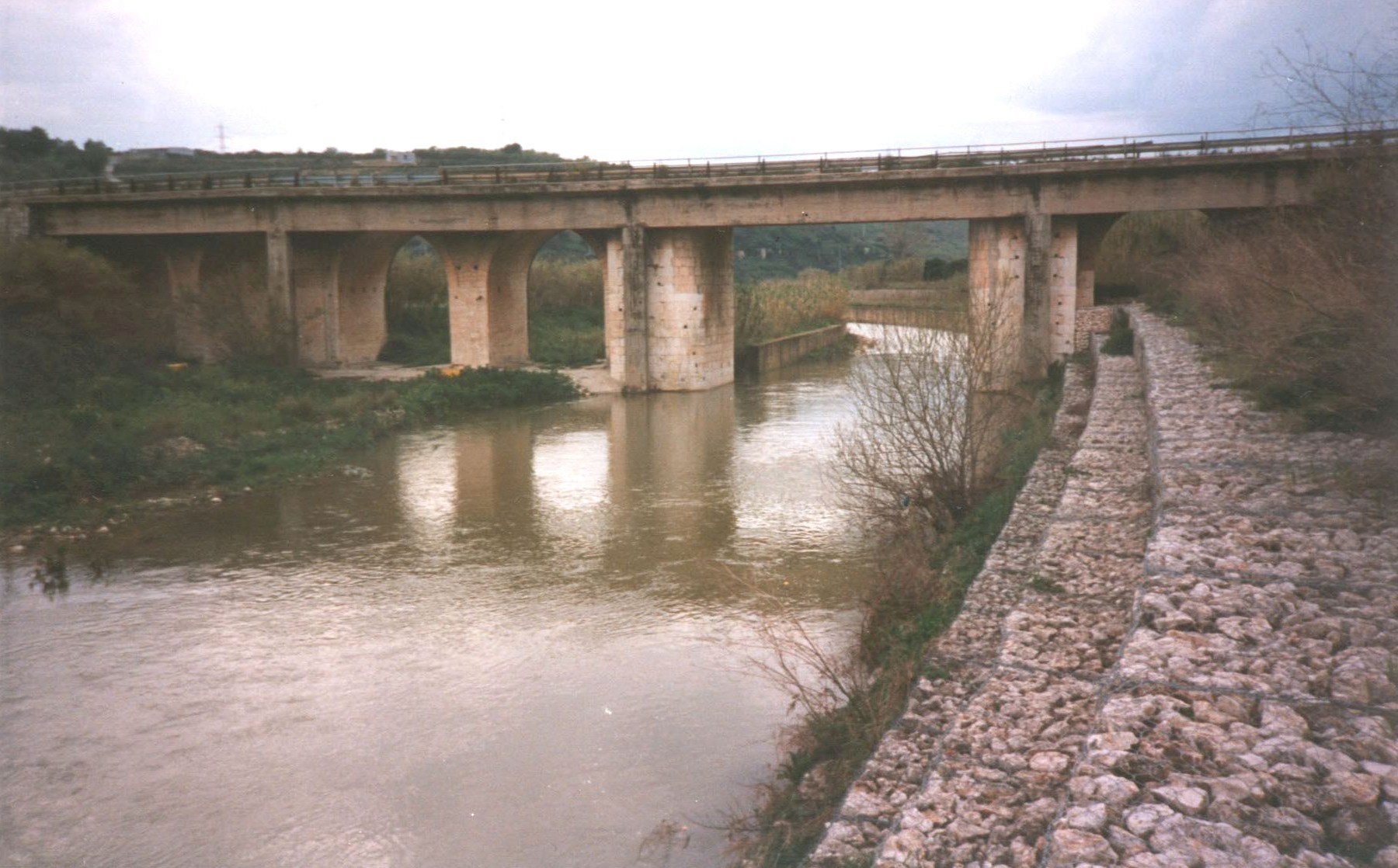
The Diddino bridge

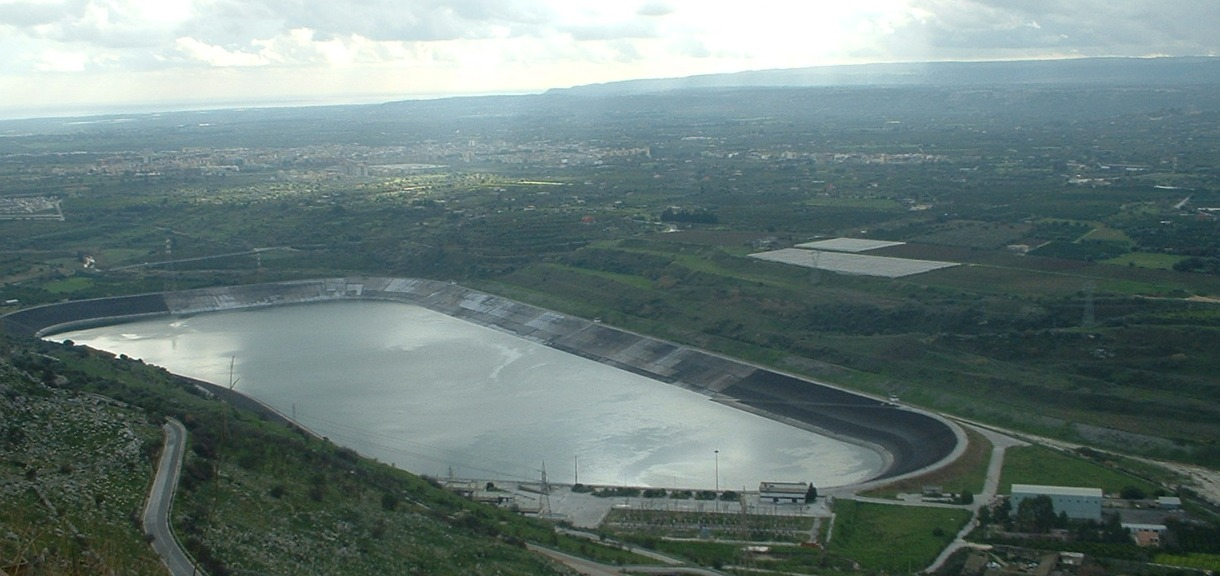
The hydroelectric station of Anapo near Solarino
