= Dirillo Lake =

Lake in Sicily, Italy

- Location within Sicily
- Location: Province of Catania, Sicily
- Coordinates: 37.1274°N 14.6947°E
- Catchment area: 118 km^{2} (46 sq mi)
- Basin countries: Italy
- Surface area: 1.1 km^{2} (0.42 sq mi)
- Average depth: 21.4 m (70 ft)
- Max. depth: 45.6 m (150 ft)
- Water volume: 23,500,000 m^{3} (830,000,000 cu ft)
- Residence time: 2.9 years
- Surface elevation: 330 m (1,080 ft)

Dirillo Lake is an reservoir to the south of Licodia Eubea in the Province of Catania, Sicily, Italy, which was formed in the 1960s by damming the river Dirillo. It has a surface area of 1.1 km^{2}, an average depth of 21.4m and an altitude of 330m.
