= Mazzarrone =

- Comune
- Comune di Mazzarrone
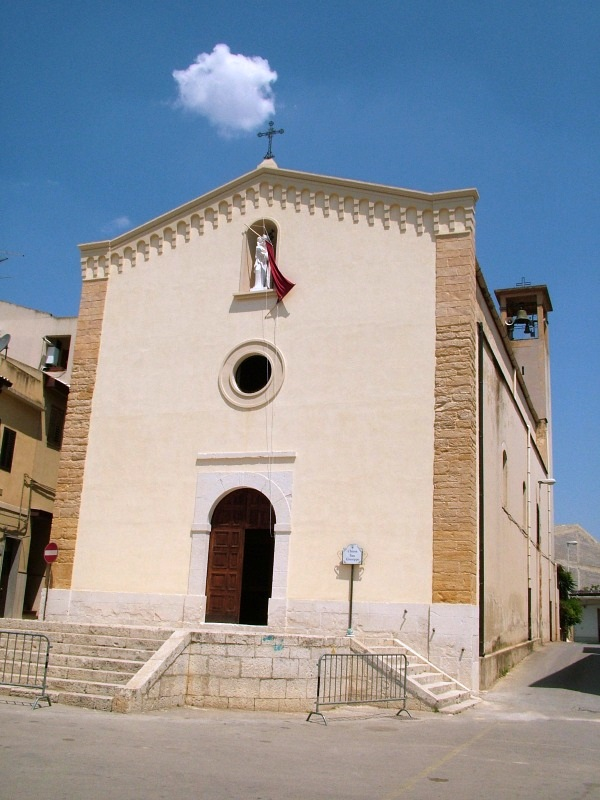

- Coat of arms

- Location within Italy Location within Sicily
- Coordinates: 37°5′N 14°34′E
- Country: Italy
- Region: Sicily
- Metropolitan city: Catania (CT)
- Frazioni: Leva, Grassura

Government
  - Mayor: Giovanni Spata

Area
  - Total: 34.78 km^{2} (13.43 sq mi)
- Elevation: 285 m (935 ft)

Population (31 December 2024)
  - Total: 3,986
  - Density: 114.6/km^{2} (296.8/sq mi)
- Demonym: Mazzarronesi
- Time zone: UTC+1 (CET)
  - Summer (DST): UTC+2 (CEST)
- Postal code: 95040
- Dialing code: 0933
- Patron saint: St. Joseph
- Saint day: 19 March
- Website: www.comune.mazzarrone.ct.it

Mazzarrone (Sicilian: Mazzarruni) is a comune (municipality) in the Metropolitan City of Catania in the Italian region Sicily, located about 242 kilometres (150 mi) southeast of Palermo and about 85 kilometres (53 mi) southwest of Catania.

Mazzarrone borders the following municipalities: Acate, Caltagirone, Chiaramonte Gulfi, Licodia Eubea. It is best known for production of the table grapes named after it, the Mazzarrone grape.
