= San Giovanni Battista, Monterosso Almo =

Church in Italy

Coordinates: 37.08905°N 14.76177°E

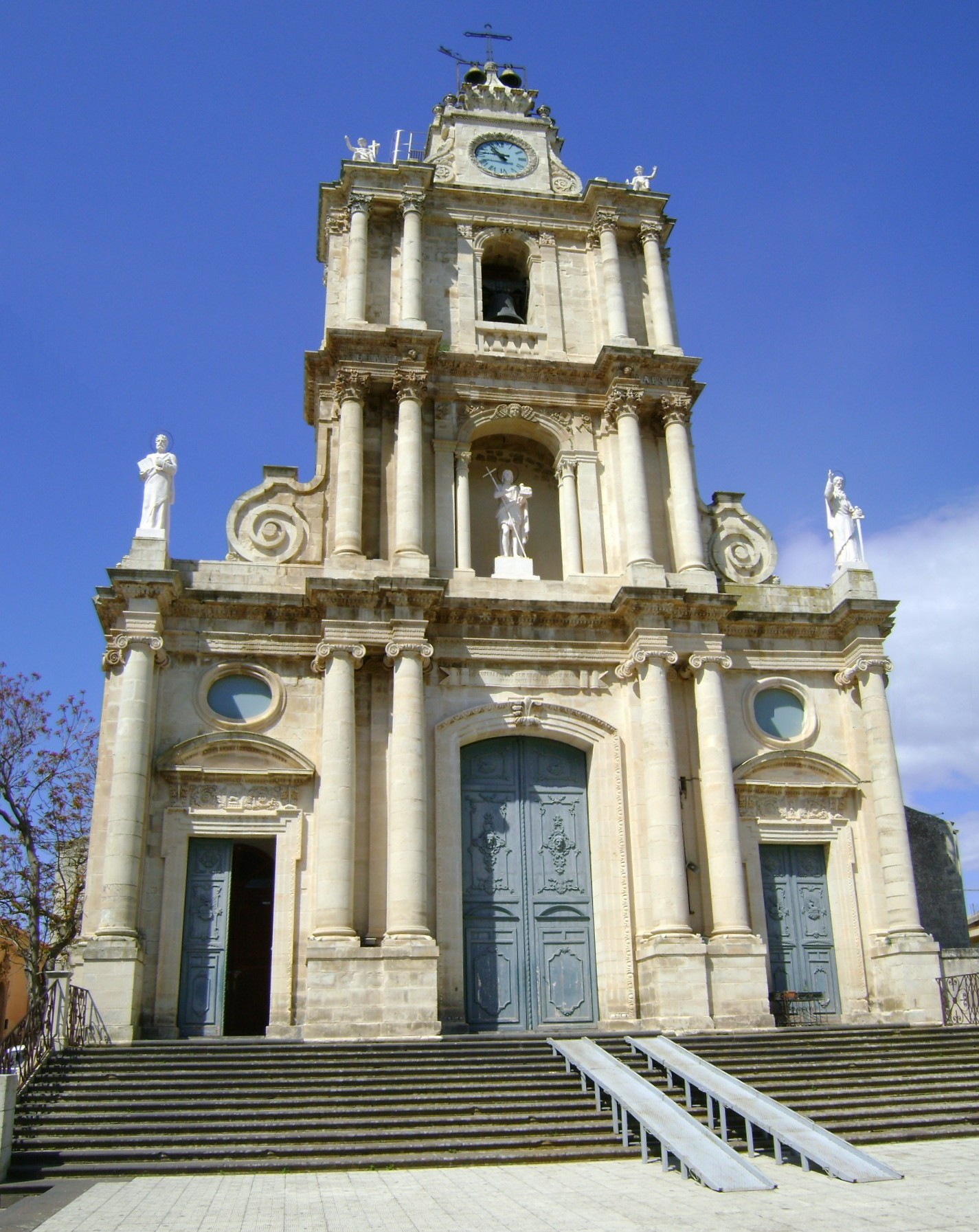
Facade of church

San Giovanni Battista ("St John the Baptist") is a Baroque-style Roman Catholic church located on the central plaza of the town of Monterosso Almo in Sicily, Italy. Also facing this piazza is the town hall, the Franciscan church of Sant'Anna, and the palazzi Sardo and Coccuza.

== History ==
A church at the site was lightly damaged by the 1693 Sicily earthquake, but underwent refurbishment by Vincenzo Sinatra in the following century. The facade is accessed through a series of broad stairs, initially leading to a large balustraded terrace. The facade rises in four levels, with a central bell and clock tower above the portal with protruding columns. Above the portal is a statue of John the Baptist, flanked on the outside by statues of St Paul (on right with sword) and St Peter (on left with book and keys).

The interior stuccoes were created by Carmelo Fantauzzo of Grammichele. The 18th-century wooden engraved pulpit depicts the patron saint.
