= Monte Arcibessi =

Mountain in Italy

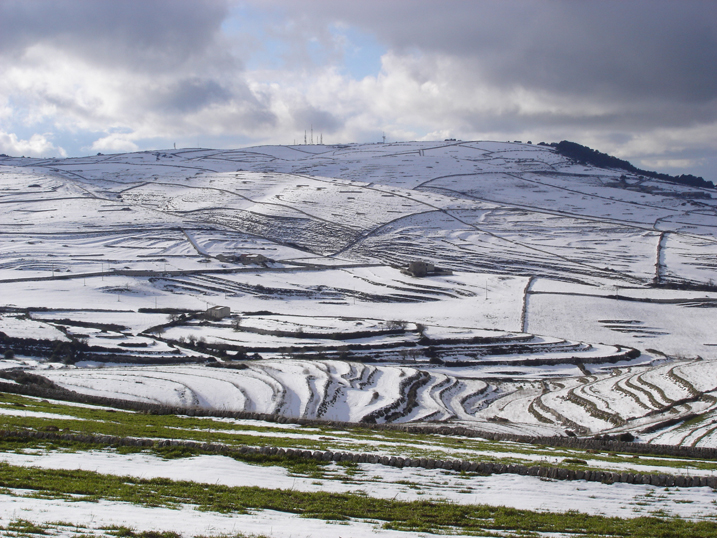
- Mount Arcibessi in winter

Highest point
- Elevation: 907 m (2,976 ft)
- Coordinates: 37°01′49″N 14°43′00″E

Geography
- Location within Italy
- Location: Province of Ragusa, Italy
- Parent range: Hyblaean Mountains

Climbing
- Easiest route: mountain walk from the road at Chiaramonte Gulfi.

Monte Arcibessi is a mountain located in the Sicilian province of Ragusa and is one of the highest peaks in the Hyblaen Mountain chain. It stretches between the Chiaramonte Gulfi and Ragusa communes. With its adjacent mountains, Monte Arcibessi is a part of the Miocene volcanic submarine complex, but they are no longer active.

There are fortified settlements (castellieri) of the Bronze Age and Iron Age in the area of Monte Arcibessi. Prehistoric inhabitants, remnants of Archaic Greek settlements, signs from the Hellenistic and Roman periods and Byzantine and Medieval remains.

As one of the highest in the area, it is the site of numerous antenna installations for radio stations and television transmitters. It is also popular for mountain biking.

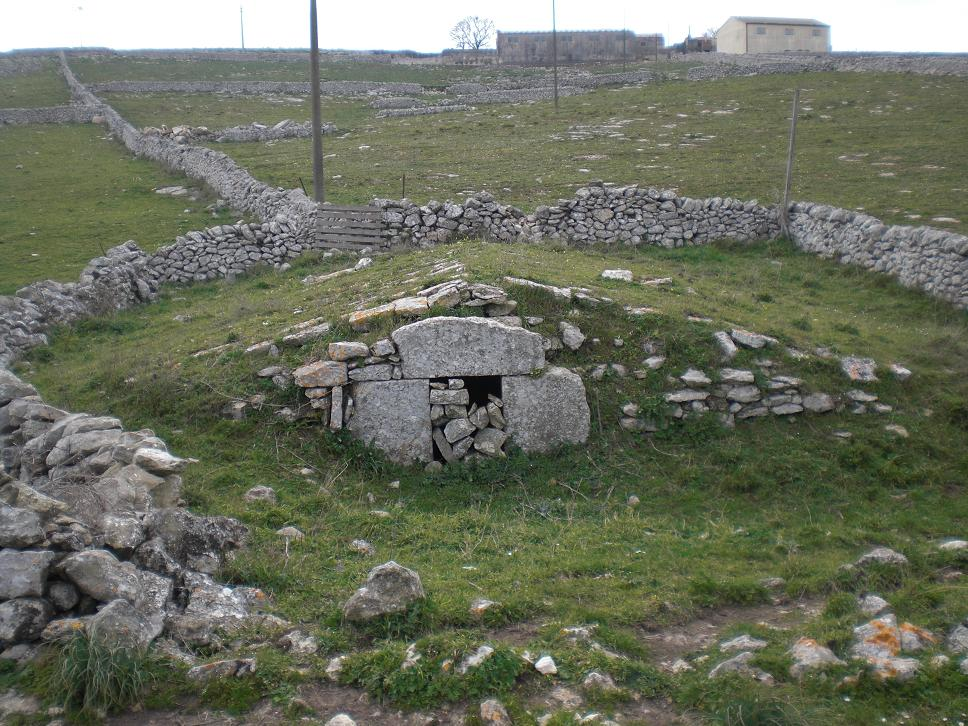
Ice house near Monte Arcibessi.
