= Dirillo =

Location
- Country: Sicily: provinces of Ragusa, Caltanissetta and Catania

Physical characteristics
- Source
  - location: Iblei mountains, near Vizzini
  - elevation: 986 m (3,235 ft)
- Mouth: Mediterranean Sea
  - location: Strait of Sicily, south-east of Gela
  - coordinates: 37.0025°N 14.3374°E
  - elevation: 0 m (0 ft)
- Length: 54 km (34 mi)
- Basin size: 739.39 km^{2} (285.48 sq mi)

The Dirillo, or Acate, is a 54-kilometre (34 mi) river in Sicily which rises in the Hyblaean Mountains and flows through the areas of Vizzini, Licodia Eubea, Mazzarrone, Chiaramonte Gulfi, Acate, Vittoria, Gela. It empties into the Strait of Sicily south-east of the town of Gela. As the largest river in the area it is sometimes known as the Fiume Grande.

The river was known in antiquity as the Achates (Ancient Greek: Ἀχάτης). It was noted by Silius Italicus for the remarkable clearness of its waters. Theophrastus in his treatise On Stones (ca. 315 B.C.) indicates that the name of the gemstone achates (agate) was based on the source of such stones from this river. Pliny the Elder makes the same connection in his Naturalis Historia Agate and chalcedony can still be found here. During the period of Arab rule it became known as Wadi‑Ikrilu: ‘The River of Acrille’, an ancient Greek-Roman colony that stood in the surroundings.

In the 1950s, the Azienda Nazionale Idrogenazione Combustibili dammed the river near Licodia Eubea to create Lago Dirillo, a reservoir for the Polo petrolchimico di Gela petrochemical plants. With good fishing and camping facilities, as well its natural scenery, this area has become a tourist attraction.
