= Corrado Melfi =

Italian historian and archaeologist

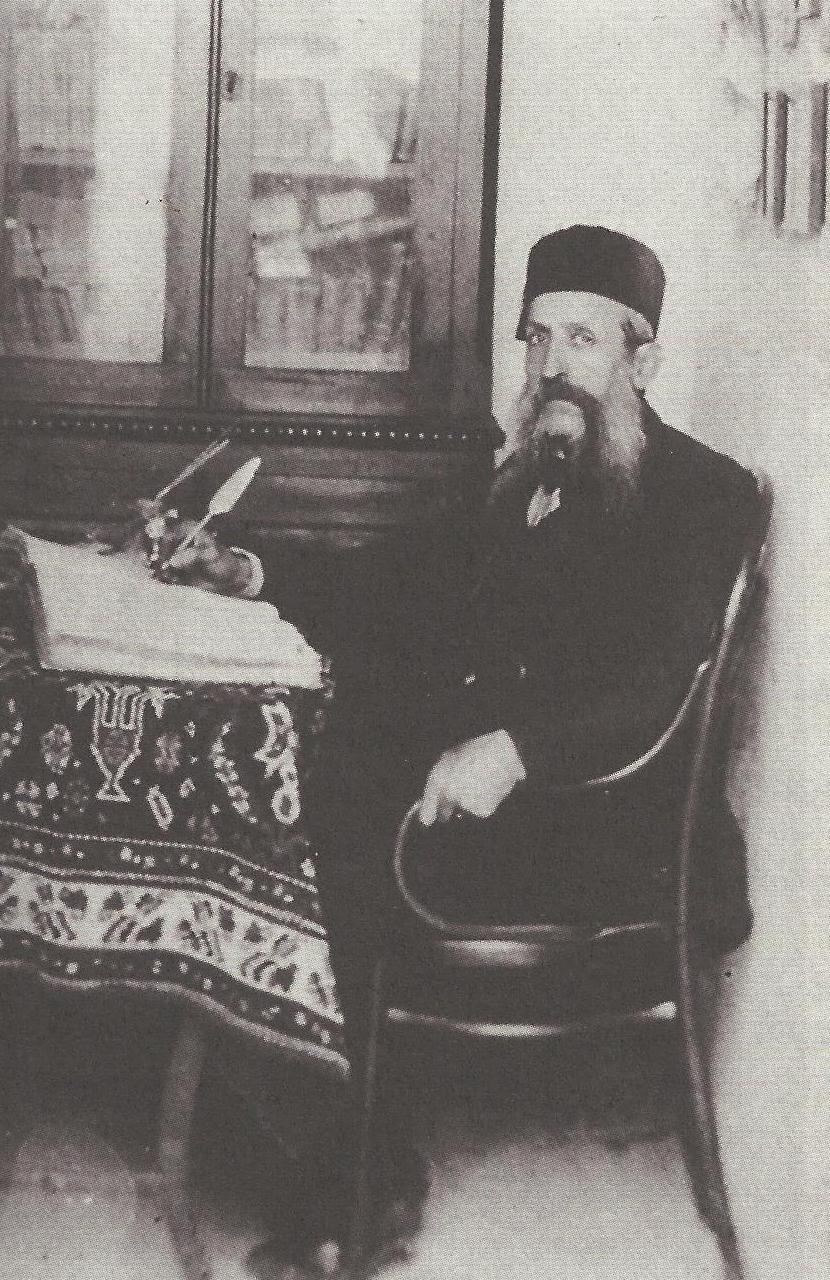
Corrado Melfi, Baron of St. John.

Corrado Melfi, Baron of St. John (Chiaramonte Gulfi, January 16, 1850 - January 9, 1940) was an Italian historian and archaeologist. At the end of the 19th century he discovered the archeological site of Akrillai and the minor site of Scornavacche, not far from Akrillai. In 1912 he gave large accounts of his discoveries in his Cenni storici su Chiaramonte Gulfi.

The findings of excavations are housed in the Hyblean Archaeological Museum of Ragusa and in the Archeological Museum of Syracuse.
