= Monterosso Almo =

- Comune
- Comune di Monterosso Almo
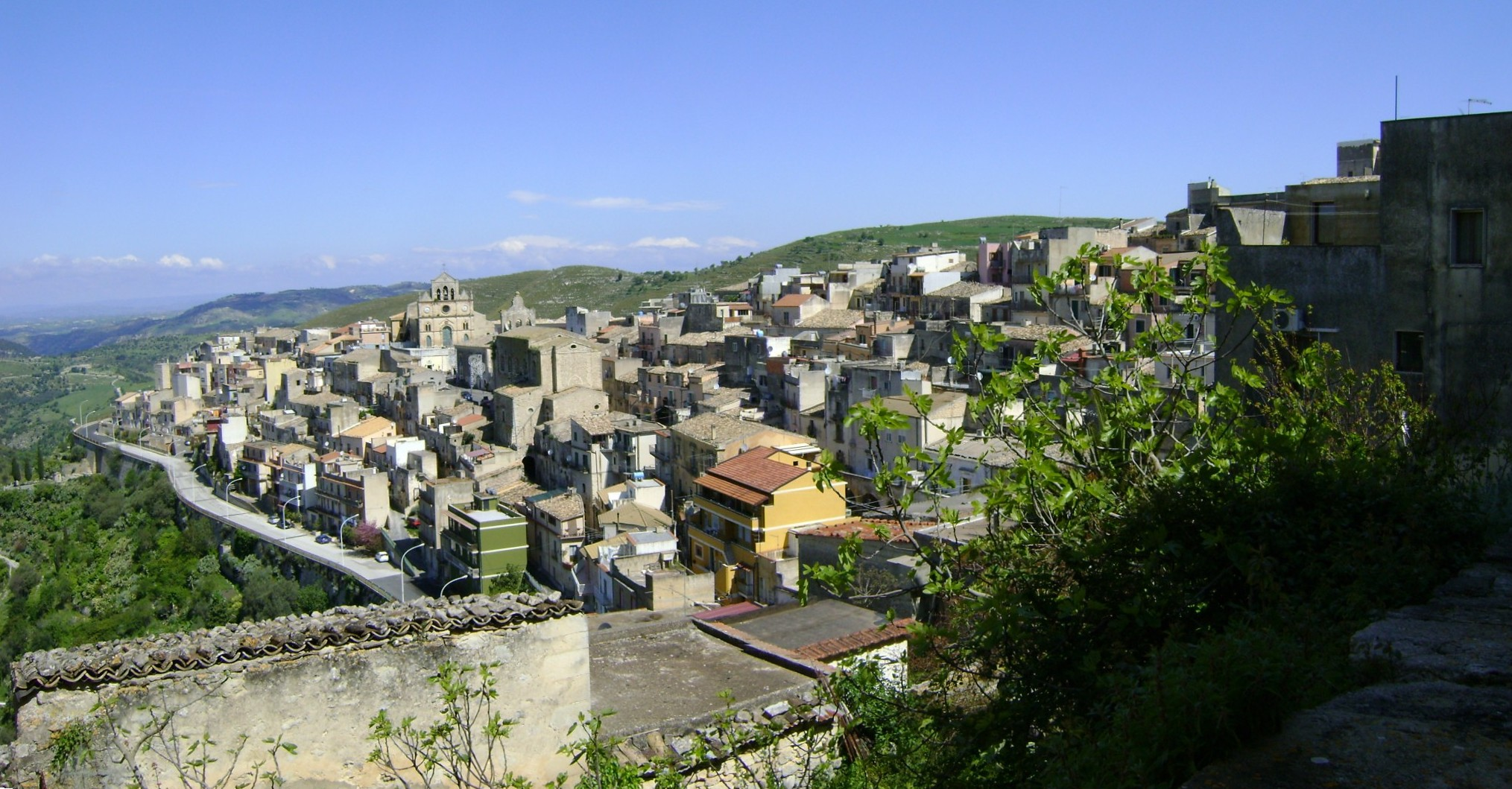

- Coat of arms

- Location within Italy Location within Sicily
- Coordinates: 37°6′N 14°46′E
- Country: Italy
- Region: Sicily
- Province: Ragusa (RG)
- Frazioni: Monterosso Almo

Government
  - Mayor: Salvatore Pagano

Area
  - Total: 56.55 km^{2} (21.83 sq mi)
- Elevation: 691 m (2,267 ft)

Population (30 November 2017)
  - Total: 2,954
  - Density: 52.24/km^{2} (135.3/sq mi)
- Demonym: Monterossani
- Time zone: UTC+1 (CET)
  - Summer (DST): UTC+2 (CEST)
- Postal code: 97010
- Dialing code: 0932
- Patron saint: John the Baptist and Maria Addolorata
- Saint day: First Sunday of September and third Sunday of September
- Website: Official website

Monterosso Almo (Sicilian: Muntirrussu) is a comune in the province of Ragusa, Sicilia, southern Italy. It is one of I Borghi più belli d'Italia ("The most beautiful villages of Italy").

Located on the central plaza is the Baroque church of San Giovanni Battista.
