= Irminio =

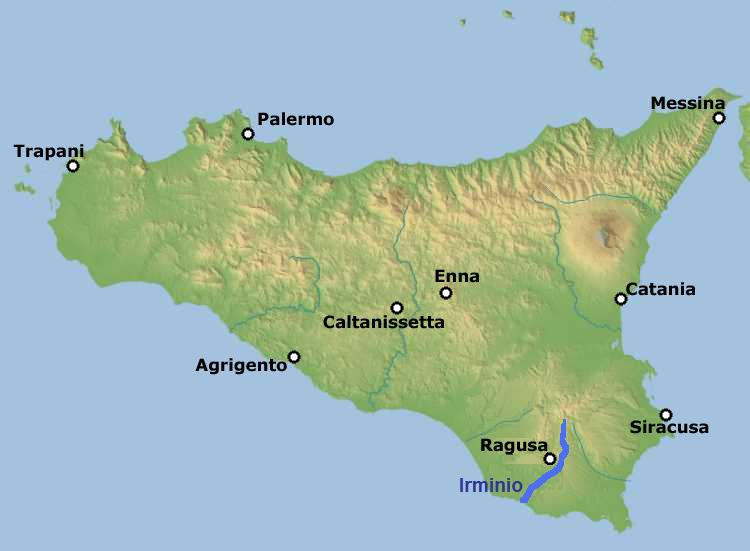
- Map of the Irminio.

Location
- Country: Italy

Physical characteristics
- Source
  - location: Monte Lauro; Hyblaean Mountains
  - elevation: 986 m (3,235 ft)
- Mouth: Mediterranean Sea
  - coordinates: 36.7727°N 14.5955°E
- Length: 55 km (34 mi)
- Basin size: 254.56 km^{2} (98.29 sq mi)

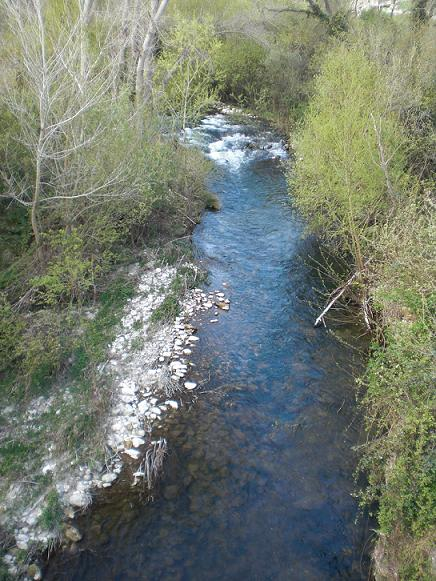
240pxThe Oasi Irminio area at 33 kilometres (21 mi) from the mouth.

The Irminio (Sicilian: Iriminiu; Italian: Irminio; Latin: Hirminius) is a 55-kilometre (34 mi) long river located in south-eastern Sicily, southern Italy. It is the most important of the rivers of the province of Ragusa.

The river rises at Monte Lauro, the main peak of the Hyblaean Mountains, which forms the main part of the mountainous southeast of Sicily and runs across the province from north-east to south-west before emptying into the Mediterranean Sea 2.5 kilometres (1.6 mi) east of Marina di Ragusa. Its main tributaries are the streams Cava Volpe, Ciaramite, Mastratto, and near Ragusa Ibla the streams San Leonardo and Santa Domenica.

== Natural reserves ==
Halfway through its course the river is housing a small area classified as Oasi Irminio for the brown trout and at its mouth the Natural reserve Macchia Foresta del fiume Irminio of 134 hectares (330 acres).

== Dam ==
The 10 November 1976 works started to build a dam along the river in the area between Ragusa and Giarratana. The structure, 57.10 metres (187.3 ft) tall, was completed in 1983 to create the Lago di Santa Rosalia, a reservoir for agricultural use but also used for recreational fishing.
