= Giarratana =

- Comune
- Comune di Giarratana
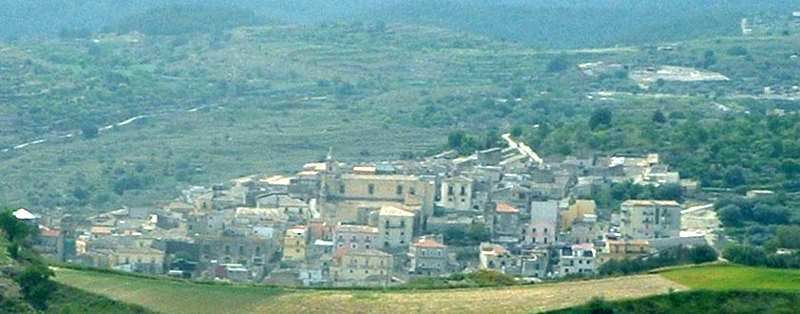

- Coat of arms

- Location within Italy Location within Sicily
- Coordinates: 37°3′N 14°48′E
- Country: Italy
- Region: Sicily
- Province: Ragusa (RG)
- Frazioni: Giarratana

Government
  - Mayor: Bartolo Giaquinta

Area
  - Total: 43.47 km^{2} (16.78 sq mi)
- Elevation: 520 m (1,710 ft)

Population (30 November 2017)
  - Total: 2,970
  - Density: 68.3/km^{2} (177/sq mi)
- Demonym: Giarratanesi
- Time zone: UTC+1 (CET)
  - Summer (DST): UTC+2 (CEST)
- Postal code: 97010
- Dialing code: 0932
- Patron saint: St. Bartholomew the Apostle,
- Saint day: 24 August
- Website: Official website

Giarratana is a town and comune in the province of Ragusa, Sicily, southern Italy. Giarratana is known as "the pearl of the Iblei" (Perla degli Iblei), and is located nearby the Irminio River.

Giarratana is home to significant archaeological findings. Early in its history, the town went through major historic phases, namely when it was known as the ancient town of Casmene, and later, the old town of Terrevecchia.

== Etymology ==
The name Giarratana is derived from Cerretana, which is believed to be a derivative of the Italian phytonym cerro or Sicilian cerru.

Additionally, Sicilian etymologist Michele Pasqualino traces the name Giarratana from Ceratanum or Cerretanum, which stems from Latin for Quercus Cerris, roughly translating to a forest of Turkey Oak trees, reflecting the presence of many oak trees in the area. Alternative historic spellings include "Ceratanum, Cerretanum, Ceretanum,...Cerretana", Iarratana, Jaratana, and Jarratana.

Giarratana "...was once called Ceretanum from its fortress.", and many Greco-Siculi vases were found during excavations. In many sources, Giarratana is known as the old Ceretanum.

== History ==
The ancient Greek archeologic site of Casmene, founded in 643 B.C., is located to the east of modern day Giarratana. There were two settlements known from Roman period, the flat area named Margi on the road linking Ragusa to modern day Giarratana, and a villa in the current city where ancient mosaics were found. From this time until the medieval period, the history of Giarratana is not well known.

The town of Giarratana saw many changes of acquisition over the centuries, reflecting its changing status. Written records of Giarratana began to increase in 1194, during the Swabian takeover of Sicily. In 1195, Giarratana was granted by Emperor Henry VI to Rinaldo Acquaviva of the Reali family.

In 1249, Giarratana was deemed a casal (small, open localities, without any autonomy). In 1253, Giarratana belonged to Gautier Caltagirone, and was named castrum and terram (intermediate housing). In 1272, Giarratana was reduced to a casal, which is thought to be due the revolt against Charles I of Anjou in 1268. It's believed that Gautier Caltagirone was a key figure in the "great conspiracy" and uprisings against the Angevin authority, following the intense repression after 1268. As punishment, Gautier's castle was destroyed, and Charles gave the town of Giarratana to Guillaume de Sens. This served as a reminder of the strengthened Franco-Provençal power structure over the territory. 1282 saw a "national revolution". This resulted in a long process of depression, with a constant state of war, a decrease in the population of Giarratana, and the rise of fortified housing protected by a castle (terra cum castro). Only the castles equipped with a tower and defended by a strong feudal lineage were able to achieve one incastellamento. Whenever a new castle was constructed, there was land concentration, which proved to have a strategic objective for the town of Giarratana. It allowed for the control of the passage of the Irminio River, which connects the northwest part of the mountains to the coastal port region of Scicli.

The years of 1296-1337 saw Frederick III's reign over Sicily, durinig which Nicholas Lancia ruled over Giarratana. Three decades later, Sicily was divided by the powerful Alagona, Chiaramonte, Peralta and Ventimiglia families, the first of which controlled Giarratana. Giarratana, considered to be under the region of Val di Noto, went from Artale Alagona to his brother Giacomo in 1360. During this time, it rose in status from a mere casal with walls and a castle, to a terra, a way of recognizing its centuries old vocation in agriculture. Sometime after 1350, Giarratana was a strategic location in the county of Modica during the conflict between the Alagona and Chiaramonte families. A temporary peace was welcomed in 1380. In 1392, Queen Maria of Sicily was married to Martin the Younger, the next in line from the King of Aragon, which consolidated Aragonese control over Sicily. That same year, the commander of the royal armada, Bernat Cabrera (grandson of the Count of Ossuna) was awarded the title of vigilante and was given a large estate. In 1394, Bernat was granted the territory of Giarratana, allowing him to guard the strategic opening on the northeast region of the county and control commercial traffic in the mountainous area.

Things would get chaotic for Giarratana and the surrounding region. In 1410, after the King of Aragon died, Sicily saw much conflict and destruction due to the conflict between the Queen and Bernat. The Parliament initially sided with the latter, but eventually had him taken prisoner. Ferdinand was the new king of Sicily, and ordered Bernat to pay his main enemy (Admiral Sancho Ruiz de Lihoria of the Heredia family) a large sum. In order to pay this, Bernat has to give up his territory, which included Giarratana. After 1416, Bernat Cabrera was allowed to govern the county of Modica once again, and his son Giovanni acquired Giarratana, later to become the new Count of Modica after Bernat's passing in 1423. This was a difficult time for Giarratana and the surrounding area, because of financial difficulties, and mistreatment from Giovanni, according to the vassals. The vssals rose up and openly declared that they rather be under the rulership of the king. From 1445 to 1451, Alfonso V attempted to eliminate Giovanni Cabrera, even going to the extent of retroactively invalidating the 1392 privilege given to his father. This led to a settlement between King Alfonso V and Giovanni Cabrera, in which Giovanni was allowed to hold onto his territory, but in exchange for a large sum. In order to come up with this large sum, Giovanni had to sell some of his land, including Giarratana, to a merchant banker named Simonetto Settimo. This led to a new chapter for Giarratana and the island of Sicily, in which a new feudalism with faithful civil servants, merchants or bankers, played a larger role in ensuring the success of the Crown. From the middle of the 1400s, the Settimo family shifted Giarratana's role away from a strategic military site, due to their strong economic and political ties within the county of Modica. The county of Modica's unity collapsed, which led to a population decline in Giarratana, but this was reversed after the transfer of Giarratana to Simonetto Settimo.

During the 1500s, Giarratana is named only terra, without reference to l'oppidum. However, the symbol of noble power, the tower, is mentioned for the first known time. By the mid 1500s, Giarratana's fortification was referred to as vetustum oppidum.

In 1504, Giovanni Antonio was now in charge of Giarratana, as he was the son of Simonetto Settimo, who had passed away. The following year, Giovanni Antonio rose up the ranks to become part of Sicilian nobility, in part due to his marriage. An earthquake in 1542 occurred, of which little is recorded, which temporarily decreased the population of Giarratana.

On July 30, 1569, Giarratana was declared a marquisate by Philip II, and gave Carlo Settimo the title of Marquis. This new status allowed Giarratana to play a more significant role in the Val di Noto. In 1583, Blasco Settimo was in charge of Giarratana, which was ordered to provide two horsemen and thirty infantrymen from the Comarca of Caltagirone and the sergeantry of Scicli. The population of Giarratana in 1593 was recorded as 2,346 inhabitants.

The 1600s brought severe, difficult changes in Giarratana's history. Natural disasters, like the drought from 1612 to 1619, and a major flood in 1622, caused the deaths of nearly a fifth of the population from 1616 to 1624. However, the population decline reversed by 1681. During that time, the castle underwent renovations to give it a more residential character, possibly indicating a positive trend toward rebirth and regrowth in the town of Giarratana.

This course was drastically altered with the earthquake of January 1693, which was felt over a distance of 100 km. According to the Duke of Camastra's records, Giarratana was one of the towns categorized as completely destroyed, as the earthquake killed approximately 18% of the population. The main church, the original Church of Sant'Antonio Abate, was in ruins, as was most of the castle. The original Basilica of Sant'Antonio Abate has a history spanning back to the 1300s, as the main place of worship for Madonna della Neve, who was proclaimed the patron saint of Giarratana in 1644.

The early 1700s saw the reconstruction of the Church of Sant'Antonio Abate, rebuilt at a higher elevation within Giarratana, which opened in 1748. It was rebuilt in a Sicilian Baroque style of architecture, and is one of the most important religious and architectural buildings in Giarratana. The grand bell of the Basilica of Sant'Antonio Abate was created in 1647, and survived the earthquake, and features a Latin inscription indicating the town's veneration of the town's patroness, Madonna della Neve. The official consecration occurred on September 21, 1783, by Bishop Giovanni Alagona, as a recognition of the church's rebirth as the religious and cultural core of Giarratana.

An elaborate late-imperial Roman villa with floor mosaics was found in 1989 near Giarratana in the Orto Mosaico district along the "regia trazzera" road.

Several mosaics not only on the floors but also on walls and various decorations were found. The mosaics have floral references and geometric figures that often intertwine with each other.

It covered an area of about 2000 m^{2}, with at least three building wings arranged around a central garden. The excavation campaigns brought to light the north-eastern sector of the villa consisting of seven rooms, a corridor or peristyle, and the east and west wings, added later and probably never completed.

Artifacts found during the excavations include a marble relief depicting the goddess Aphrodite.

Another villa was discovered a few km further south along the SS 194.

== Main sights ==
- Church of San Bartolomeo, known from 1308 but rebuilt in the late 17th century.
- Remains of Castle of Settimo
- Archaeological site of Casmenae, on the road leading to Palazzolo Acreide.

== Festivals ==
January 17 is the annual Feast of Saint Anthony the Abbot, which starts with the festive ringing of bells and cannon fire. After this, the local band, "Vincenzo Bellini", performs a musical parade around town, and the Eucharistic celebration in the basilica. At noon, the “Sciuta” tradition occurs, in which the statue of Saint Anthony from the 1600s is carried in procession through the historic center, stopping at the Church of Saint Bartholomew the Apostle for the Angelus Domini prayer. In the afternoon, at the church square is where the blessing of animals occurs, in honor of the saint, the protector of livestock. The day concludes with an evening procession through the town, before the return of the statue to the basilica, and a final prayer.

August 5 is the annual Feast of the Madonna della Neve, referring to Maria Santissima della Neve, who is the patroness of Giarratana. At 7 A.M., the joyous ringing of bells and 21 cannon blasts, and a Eucharistic celebration. At 9 A.M., the bands "Vincenzo Bellini" and "Kasmeneo" perform through the town. At noon, the grand "Sciuta" of the Madonna della Neve's statue from the basilia occurs, before a procession. In the evening, a solemn Eucharistic celebration takes place, along with a final procession, and fireworks.

== Giarratana Onion ==
Native to the town, the Giarratana Onion is the star of the show in the local agricultural festival every August.
