= Ippari =

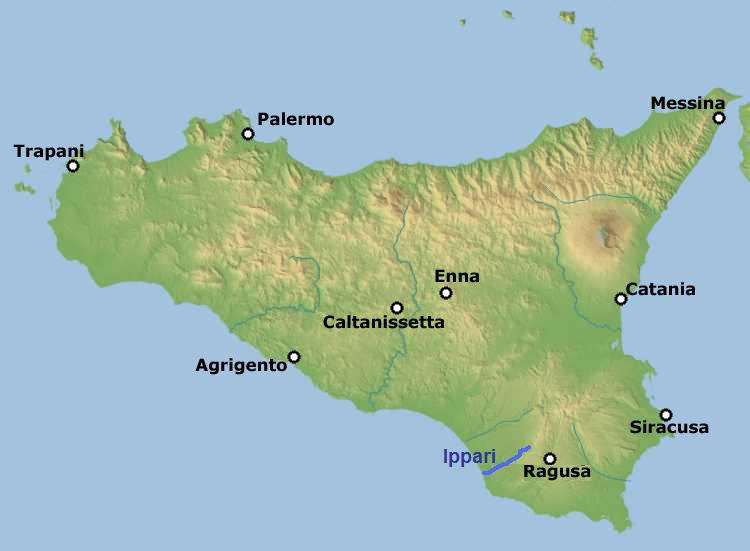
- Map showing the course of the Ippari

Location
- Country: Italy

Physical characteristics
- Source
  - location: Hyblaean Mountains
  - elevation: about 800 m (2,600 ft)
- Mouth: Mediterranean Sea
  - coordinates: 36.8761°N 14.4393°E
- Length: 28 km (17 mi)

The Ippari, anciently called the Hipparis (Ancient Greek: Ἲππαρις) is a 28-kilometre (17 mi) long river located in the province of Ragusa in south-eastern Sicily.

The river rises in the Mount Serra Brugio area of the Hyblaean Mountains, just below Chiaramonte Gulfi at a height of about 800 metres (2,600 ft) above sea level and flows into the Mediterranean Sea south of the fishing town of Scoglitti. The river passes near the towns of Comiso and Vittoria. The ruins of the ancient Greek city of Kamarina, which used the river as a Canal-port, can be found on the southern bank.

== Nature reserve ==
The lower half of its course lies in The Pino d'Aleppo Nature Reserve.
