= Hyblaean Mountains =

Mountain range

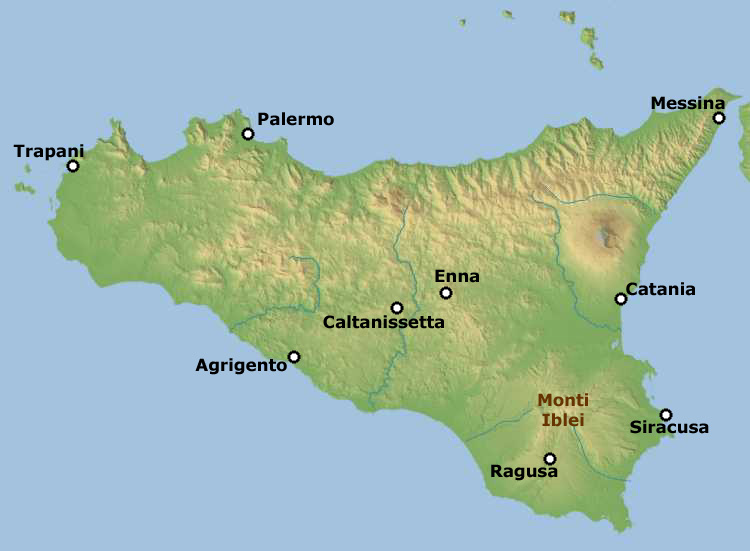
- Location of Monti Iblei.

Highest point
- Elevation: 986 m (3,235 ft)
- Coordinates: 37°06′58″N 14°49′13″E

Geography
- Location within Italy
- Location: Province of Ragusa, Province of Syracuse, Sicily, Italy

Climbing
- Easiest route: mountain walk from the road at Buscemi

The Hyblaean Mountains (Sicilian: Munt'Ibblei; Italian: Monti Iblei; Latin: Hyblaei montes) is a mountain range in south-eastern Sicily, Italy. It straddles the provinces of Ragusa, Syracuse and Catania. The highest peak of the range is Monte Lauro, at 986 metres (3,235 ft).

== History ==
The name derives from the Siculi king Hyblon, who gave a portion of his territory to Greek colonists to build the town of Megara Hyblaea.

== Geology ==
The range is composed of white limestone rocks, characterized by Karst topography. Originally a plateau, rivers have eroded the landscape, forming numerous deep canyons. In the coastal area sandstone is also present. In some areas, such as that of Monte Lauro (once part of a submerged volcanic complex), volcanic rocks are also present. The hyblaean area is characterized by a high seismic risk.

== Landscape ==
The Hyblaean Mountains are characterized by gentle slopes, interrupted by sharp valleys. In the central area are numerous woods which are intermingled with dry stone walls of typical of south-eastern Sicily. The more populated coastal area is characterised by terraced hills with Mediterranean vegetation, rising up to a plateau cultivated by olive trees, vines, citrus fruit and almonds. Other crops include grain and maize.

Hyblaean Mountains host the archaeological remains of the medieval castles of Ferla, Buscemi and Cassaro. Their discovery is relatively recent and mainly due to the archaeological campaign held in the area from 2011 to 2013.

== Main sights ==
Main attractions of the area include the Baroque towns of Ragusa, Modica and Palazzolo Acreide, the Necropolis of Pantalica and Cava Ispica.

== Peaks ==
The main peaks of the Monti Iblei are:

- Monte Lauro 986 metres (3,235 ft)
- Monte Casale 910 metres (2,990 ft)
- Monte Arcibessi 907 metres (2,976 ft)
- Serra Brugio 870 metres (2,850 ft)
- Monte Raci 610 metres (2,000 ft)
- Monte Racello 530 metres (1,740 ft)
- Monti Climiti 410 metres (1,350 ft)

== Rivers ==
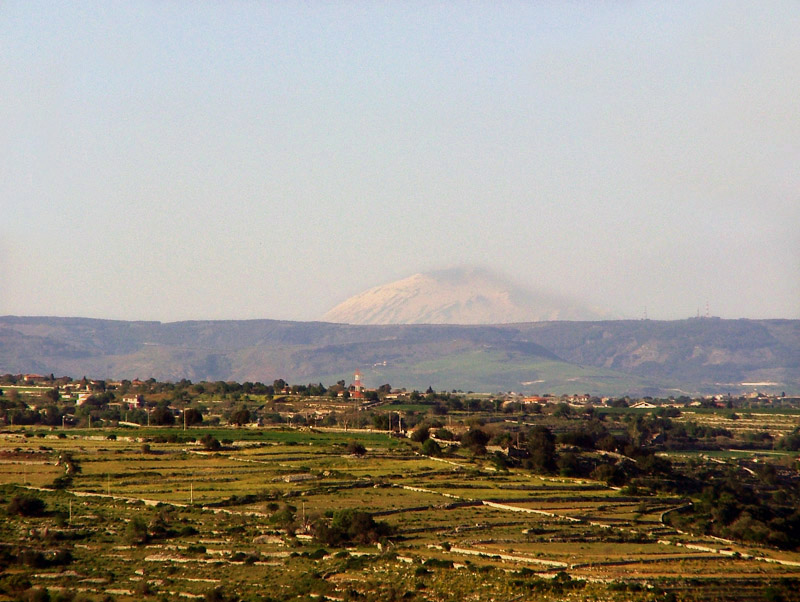
Panorama of the Hyblaean Mountains.

The range is drained by several rivers, which flow into either the Mediterranean Sea or the Ionian Sea.

River	Length	Province
Anapo	59 km	Syracuse
Irminio	55 km	Ragusa
Dirillo	54 km	Ragusa - Catania
Helorus	45 km	Ragusa - Syracuse
Cassibile	30 km	Syracuse

River	Length	Province
Ippari	28 km	Ragusa
Asinaro	22 km	Syracuse
Modica	22 km	Ragusa
Tellesimo (stream)	14 km	Ragusa - Syracuse
Ciane	08 km	Syracuse

== Bibliography ==
- Grandi Montagne - Sicilia. 2007.
