= Province of Ragusa =

Province of Italy

Province of Ragusa Provincia di Ragusa (Italian) Pruvincia di Rausa (Sicilian)
- Province
- Free Municipal Consortium of Ragusa; Libero consorzio comunale di Ragusa (Italian); Lìbbiru cunsòrziu cumunali di Raùsa (Sicilian)
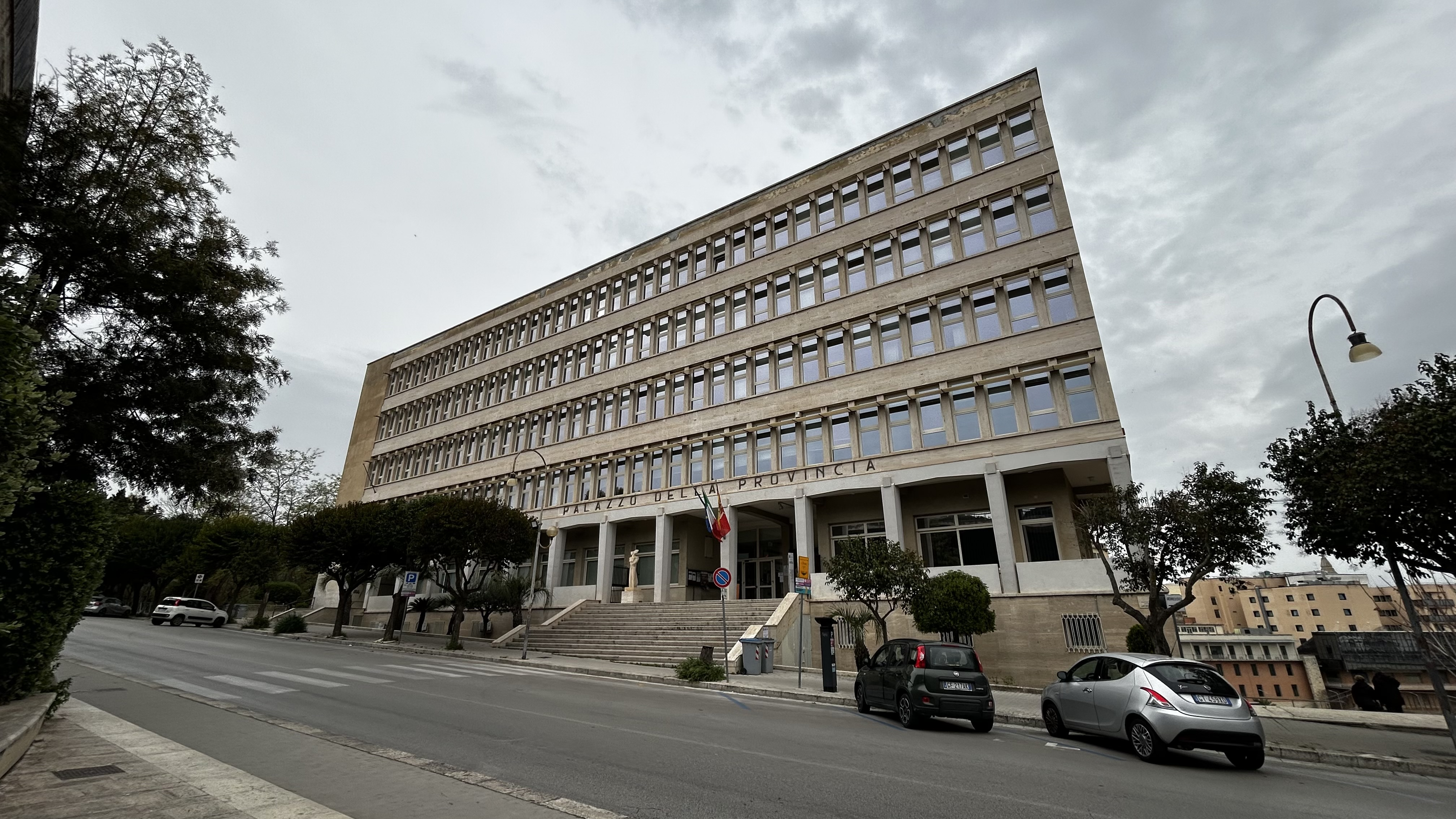
- Palazzo della Provincia, the provincial seat, 2025

- Flag Coat of arms

- Location of the province of Ragusa in Italy
- Coordinates: 36°55′30″N 14°43′50″E
- Country: Italy
- Region: Sicily
- Capital(s): Ragusa
- Municipalities: 12

Government
  - President: Maria Rita Schembari (FdI)

Area
  - Total: 1,623.89 km^{2} (626.99 sq mi)

Population (2026)
  - Total: 323,144
  - Density: 198.994/km^{2} (515.392/sq mi)

GDP
  - Total: €5.570 billion (2015)
  - Per capita: €17,428 (2015)
- Time zone: UTC+1 (CET)
  - Summer (DST): UTC+2 (CEST)
- Postal code: 97100, 97010-97015, 97017-97019
- Telephone prefix: 0932
- Vehicle registration: RG
- ISTAT code: 088

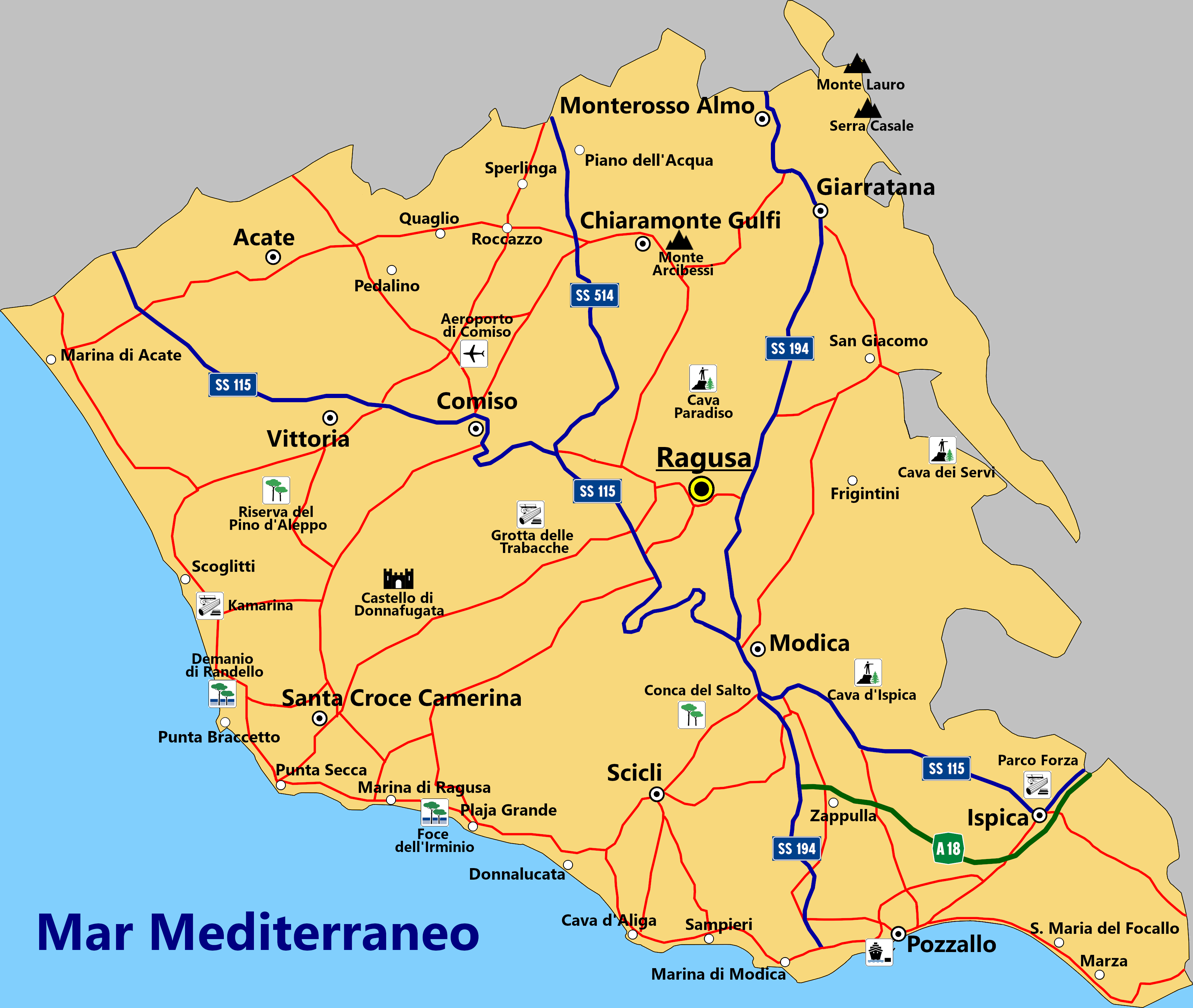
Map of the province, 2024

The province of Ragusa (Italian: provincia di Ragusa; Sicilian: pruvincia di Rausa) was a province in the autonomous island region of Sicily in Italy, located in the southeast of the island. Following the abolition of the Sicilian provinces, it was replaced in 2015 by the Free municipal consortium of Ragusa (Italian: Libero consorzio comunale di Ragusa; Sicilian: Lìbbiru cunsòrziu cumunali di Rausa). Its capital is the city of Ragusa, which is the most southern provincial capital in Italy.

It has a population of 323,144 in an area of 1,623.89 square kilometres (626.99 mi^{2}) across its 12 municipalities.

== Geography ==
From Scoglitti to Pozzallo, the Ragusan coastline is approximately 85 kilometres (53 mi) long. Along the Ragusan coast are many fishing villages such as Kaukana, Punta Secca, Marina di Ragusa and Marina di Modica. The Hyblaean Mountains are dominating the north of the province and its highest peaks are Monte Lauro, Monte Casale and Monte Arcibessi. The rivers of the province are the Irminio, Dirillo and Ippari and the only lake in the province is the Lago di Santa Rosalia along the course of the Irminio river. The skyline of Ragusa is punctuated by the towers, domes and cupolas of the many churches for which the province is known. The area is mostly unspoilt, as during the 19th century and early 20th century there was large migration from Ragusa to the more prosperous areas of Italy and abroad.

=== Municipalities ===
The former province has 12 municipalities:

- Acate
- Chiaramonte Gulfi
- Comiso
- Giarratana
- Ispica
- Modica
- Monterosso Almo
- Pozzallo
- Ragusa
- Santa Croce Camerina
- Scicli
- Vittoria

== Demographics ==
As of 2026, the population is 323,144, of which 50.5% are male, and 49.5% are female. Minors make up 16.4% of the population, and seniors make up 22.2%.

Historical population

Year	Pop.	±%
1861	129,807	—
1871	146,325	+12.7%
1881	173,655	+18.7%
1901	216,415	+24.6%
1911	248,004	+14.6%
1921	269,004	+8.5%
1931	248,881	−7.5%
1936	227,094	−8.8%

Year	Pop.	±%
1951	243,507	+7.2%
1961	252,769	+3.8%
1971	255,047	+0.9%
1981	274,583	+7.7%
1991	289,733	+5.5%
2001	295,264	+1.9%
2011	307,492	+4.1%
2021	316,142	+2.8%

Source: ISTAT

=== Immigration ===
As of 2025, immigrants make up 12.8% of the population. The 5 largest foreign countries of birth are Tunisia, Romania, Albania, Germany, and Morocco.

== Economy ==
Parts of the province have changed dramatically in the late 20th and early 21st centuries, largely due to tourism. However, others are relatively unchanged from pre-industrial times. Main productive activities can be found in the towns of Ragusa and Pozzallo, where the two major industrial areas are located. The west and south of the province are mainly dedicated to the intensive farming in greenhouses and the local vegetables leave from the Market of Vittoria to be exported to all of Europe making the province of Ragusa one of the biggest producers of greenhouse produce. In the areas around Ragusa and Modica cattle farming is at the highest levels in the region for milk, dairy and meat production. Tourism has now replaced the fishing industry as the principal source of employment along the coast.

== Transport ==
- There are no motorways in the province and the main roads are the National SS.115 that crosses from west (Gela) to east (Syracuse) and the SS.514 that running north connects Ragusa to Catania. The SP.25 (Provincial Road) runs south from Ragusa to Marina di Ragusa.
- The 120 kilometres (75 mi) of railway network of the province are entirely on single track and not electrified. Regional trains run regularly connecting the major cities.
- Comiso Airport during the cold-war was the biggest NATO base in Europe and has recently been refurbished to be converted from military to civil airport.
- The Port of Pozzallo is the only cargo and passengers port (service to Malta), and is located in the southern part of the province.
- The other ports are either fishing ports like Scoglitti and Donnalucata or Marinas for touristic boats like Marina di Ragusa and Punta Secca.

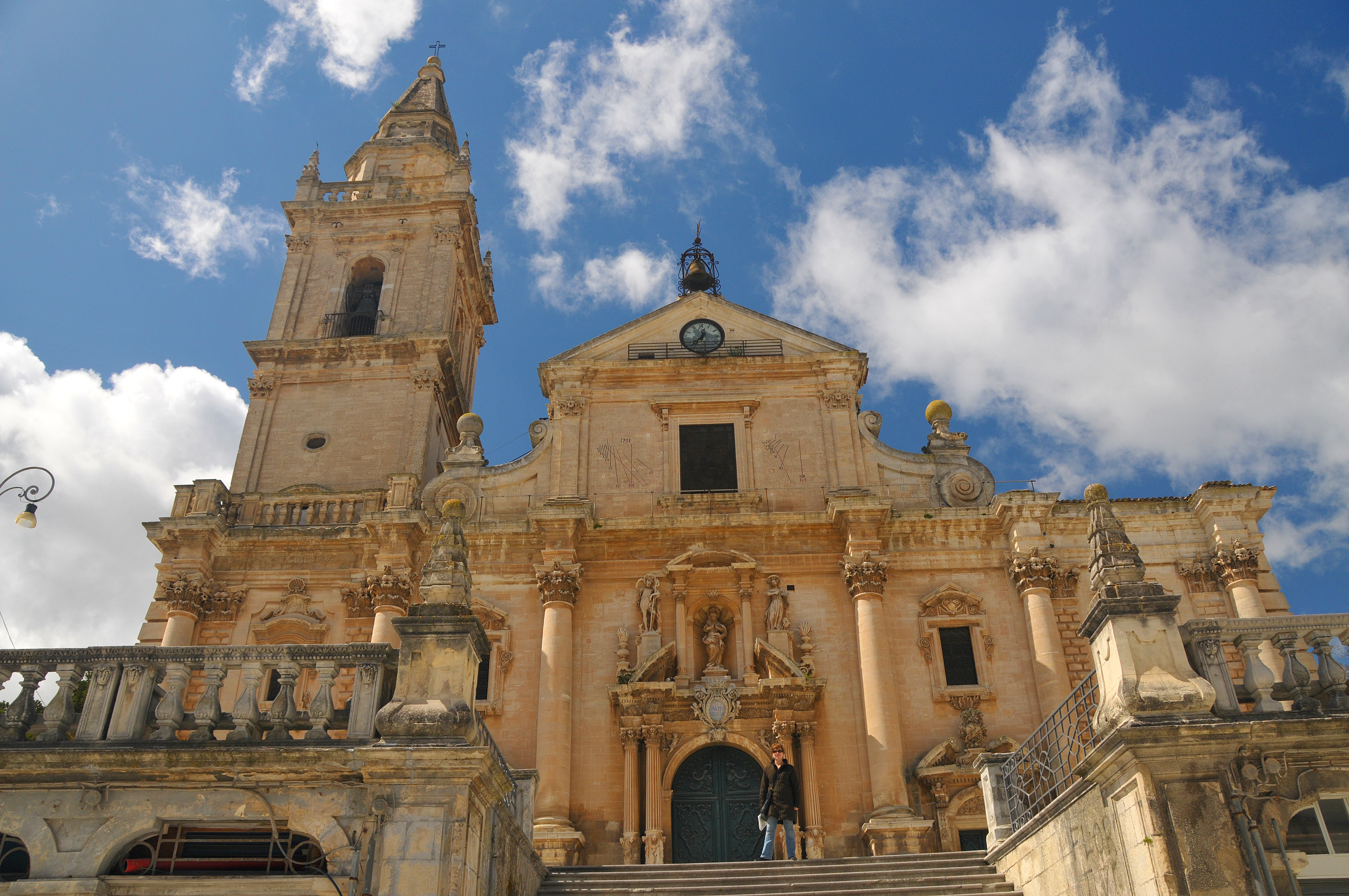
Cathedral of San Giovanni, Ragusa

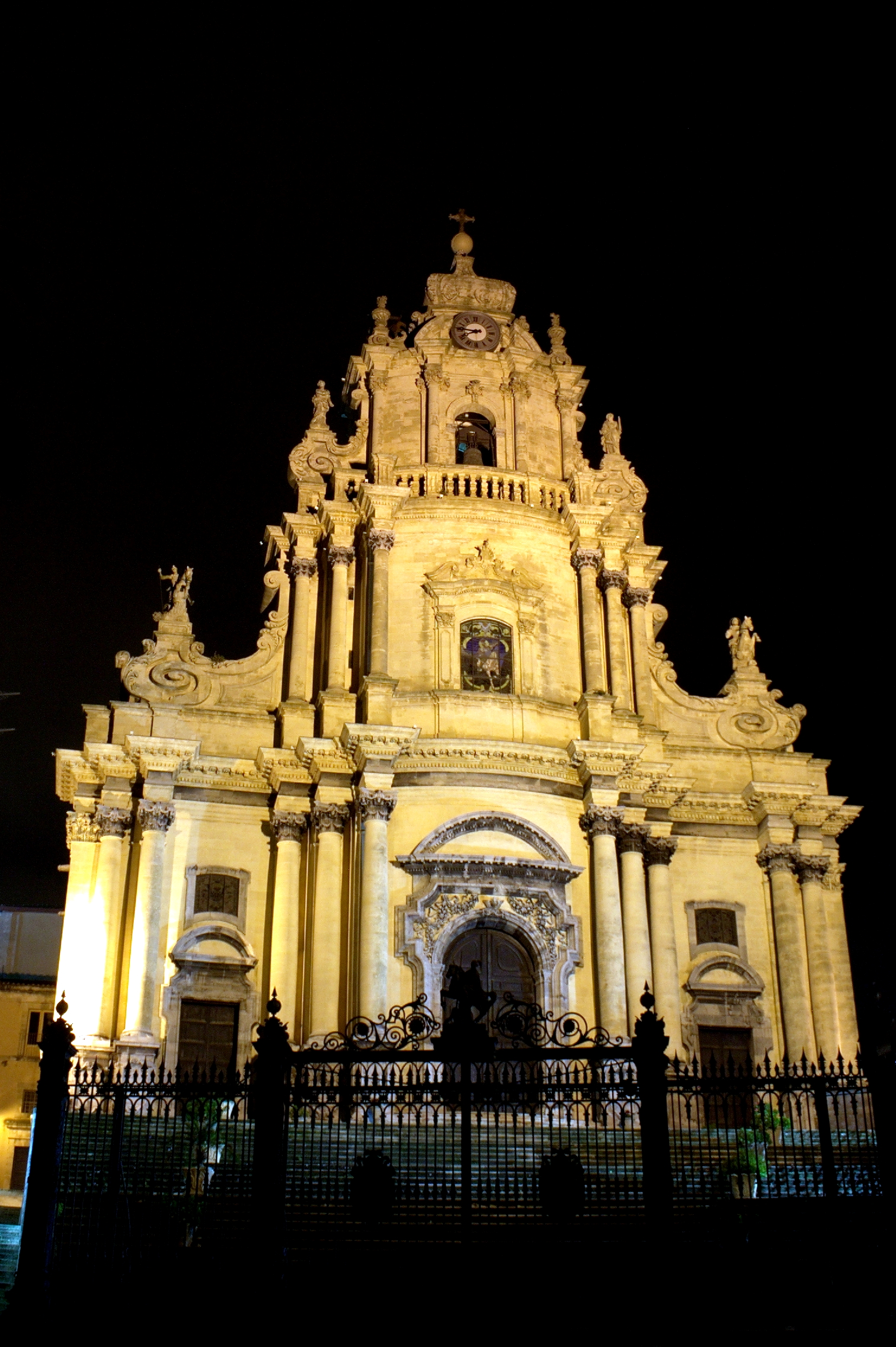
Duomo of San Giorgio, Ragusa Ibla

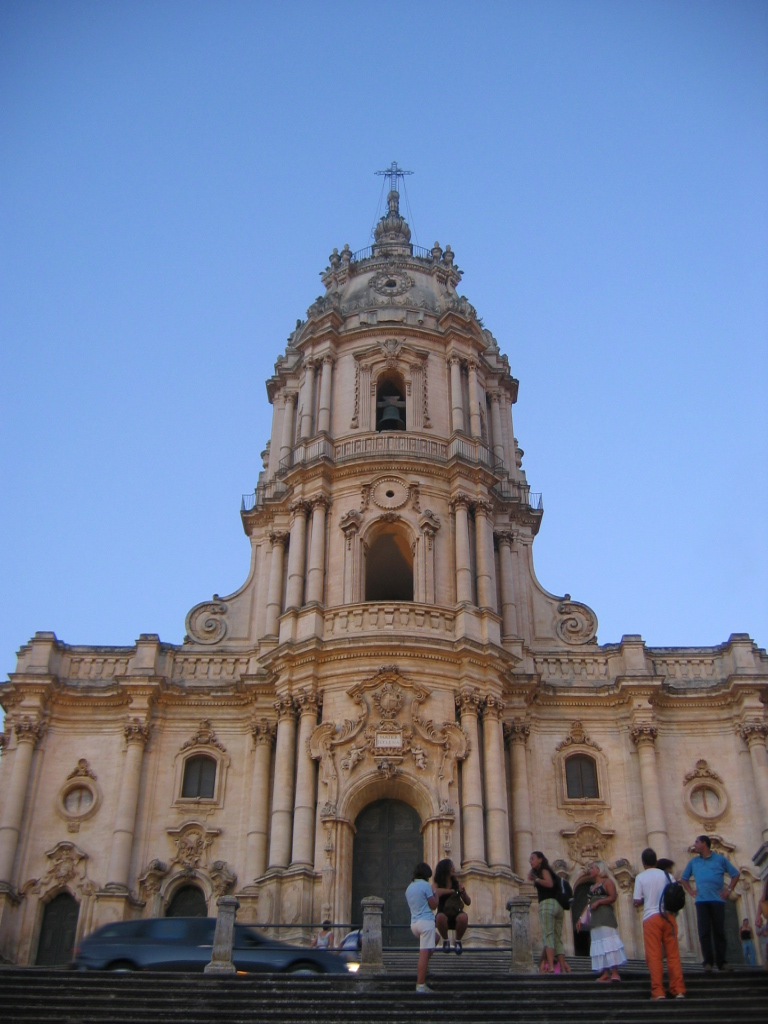
Duomo of San Giorgio, Modica

== Main sights ==
=== Baroque ===
The cities of Ragusa, Modica and Scicli contain many examples of baroque architecture and from 2002 are part of the World Heritage. The main monuments are:

- Cathedral of San Giovanni (Ragusa)
- Portal of San Giorgio (Ragusa Ibla)
- Duomo of San Giorgio (Ragusa Ibla)
- San Giorgio Cathedral, Modica
- Duomo of San Pietro (Modica)
- Church of San Bartolomeo (Scicli)
- Palazzo Beneventano (Scicli)

=== Archeology ===
- The main archeological site of the province is the Greek city of Kamarina located on the coast.
- Others are Kasmenai, Akrillai, Scornavacche, Kaukana (Roman), the Roman Baths of Comiso and the Cava Ispica.

=== Castles ===
- Castle of Donnafugata, near Ragusa, is a beautiful example of country residence of the Baron Corrado Arezzo that dominates the surrounding countryside.
- Castle of the Counts of Modica in Modica town centre.
- Castle of Naselli d’Aragona in Comiso dating to 1576.
- Ruins of the fortress of Parco Forza in Ispica.
- Acate is housing the Castle of the Prince of Biscari constructed originally in 1494, it is a commanding feature of the town square. The construction of the castle was ordered by Baron Guglielmo Raimondo Paternò, its golden coloured stone work has been modified many times during its long history, it now appears more as an 18th-century palazzo than a castle, although some crenelations and towers remain.

== See also ==
- Monti Iblei Cup (Hill Climb)
