= Buscemi =

Buscemi Buscema (Sicilian)
- Comune
- Comune di Buscemi
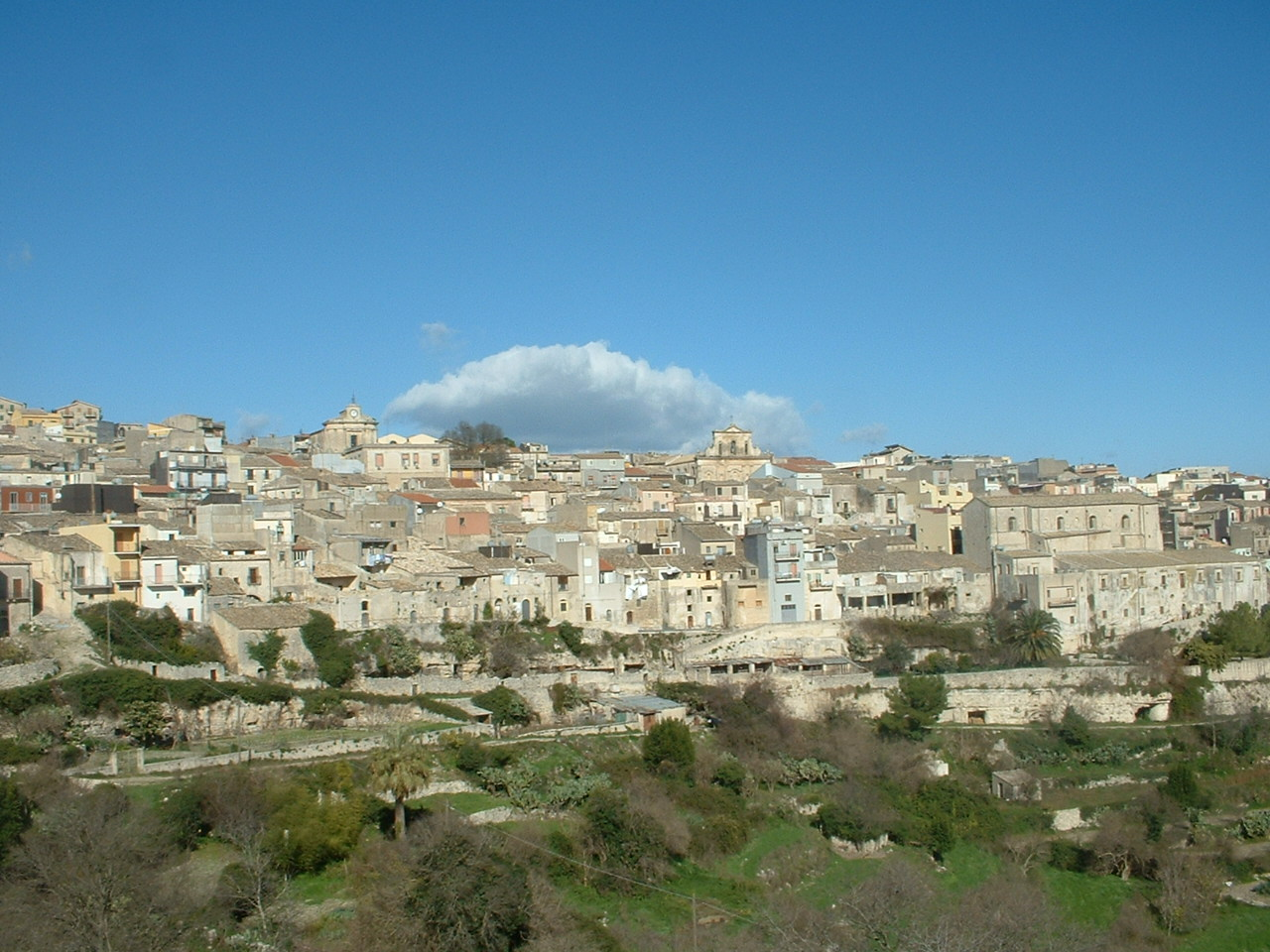

- Coat of arms

- Location within Italy Location within Sicily
- Coordinates: 37°05′N 14°53′E
- Country: Italy
- Region: Sicily
- Province: Syracuse (SR)

Government
  - Mayor: Rossella La Pira

Area
  - Total: 52.0 km^{2} (20.1 sq mi)
- Elevation: 761 m (2,497 ft)

Population (30 November 2017)
  - Total: 1,025
  - Density: 19.7/km^{2} (51.1/sq mi)
- Demonym: Buscemese
- Time zone: UTC+1 (CET)
  - Summer (DST): UTC+2 (CEST)
- Patron saint: Madonna of the Wood
- Saint day: Last Sunday in August
- Website: Official website

Buscemi (Italian: [buʃˈʃɛːmi]; Sicilian: Buscema or Buxema [bʊʃˈʃɛːma]) is an Italian town and comune (municipality) of 968 inhabitants of the free municipal consortium of Syracuse, in Sicily.

== Etymology ==
The name is from the Arabic قَلْعَة أَبِي شَامَة qalʿat ʾabī šāma (pronounced [ˈqalʕat ˈʔabiː ˈʃaːma]), a phrase reported in 1154 by the Hammudite geographer Muhammad al-Idrisi.

== Geography ==
Buscemi is located 50 kilometers west of Syracuse, 45 north of Ragusa and 70 south of Catania. The town is located on the southern slope of Monte Vignitti (788 m a.s.l.), located in the central part of the Iblei Mountains, between the relief of Contessa district and the Anapo river and is surrounded by the historic sites of ancient Akrai, Casmene and the Necropolis of Pantalica. The closest municipalities to reach are Buccheri and Palazzolo Acreide which are both less than ten kilometers away.

It is the thirteenth municipality of the province by extension of the territory with 51 km^{2} (20 sq mi), although the inhabited center extends only for just over 1 km^{2} (0.39 sq mi). Furthermore, still within the province of belonging, it is the municipality with the greatest maximum altitude (987 m a.s.l.), the third most westerly based on the municipal house (longitude: 14.8847; preceded by Buccheri and Francofonte) and the third with the greatest altitude range (655 m).

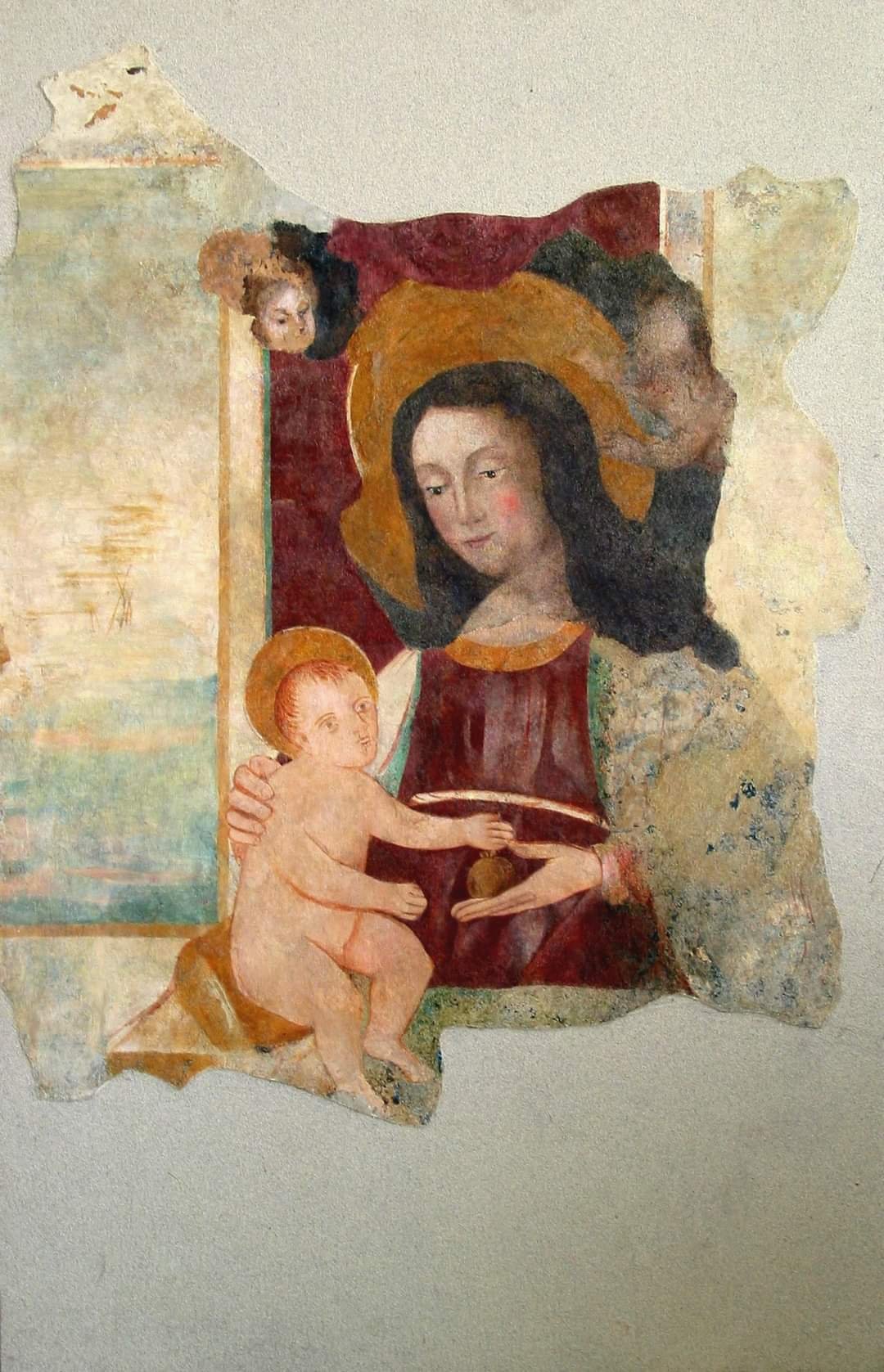
Fresco of Our Lady of the Forest

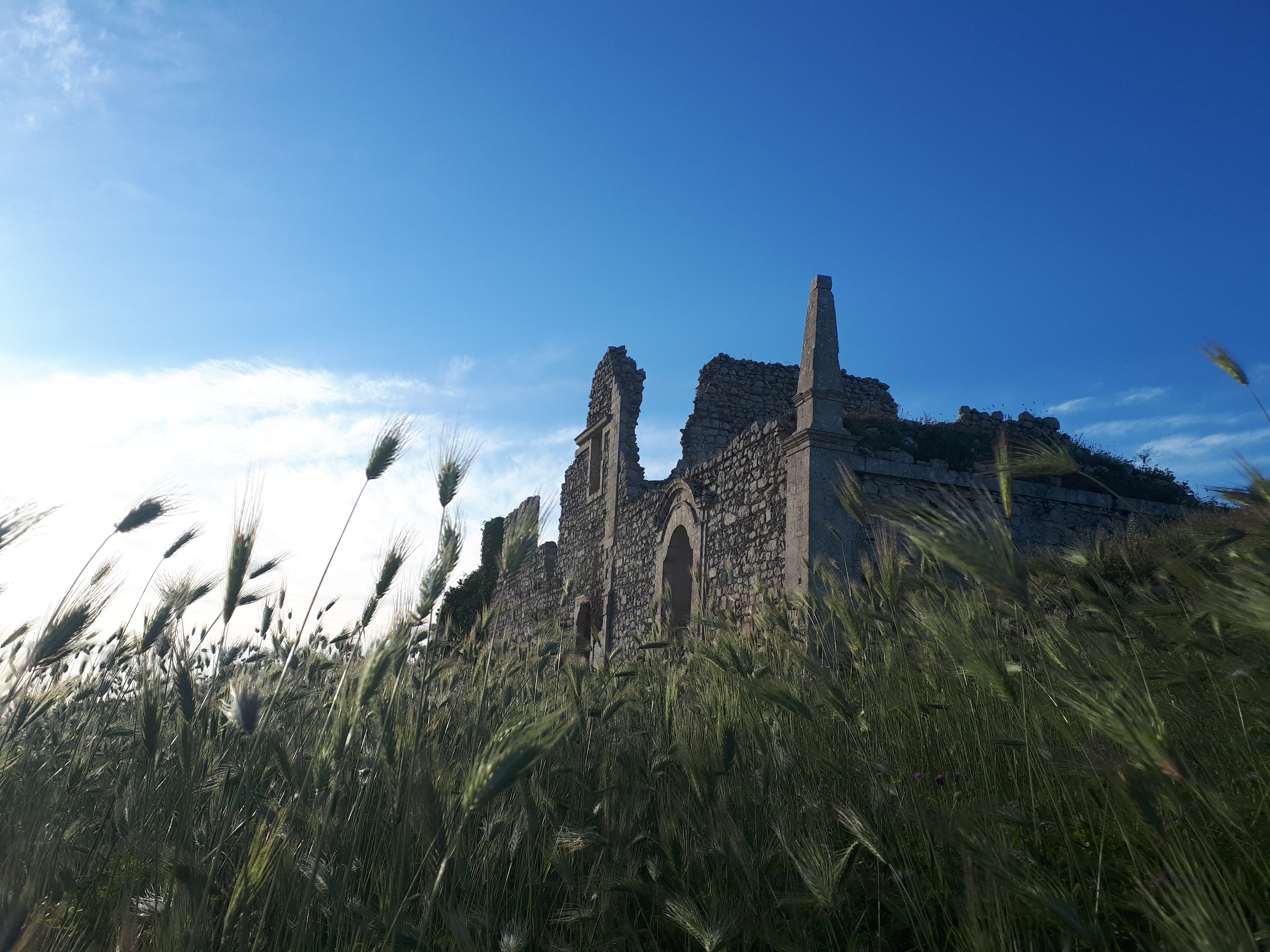
Castello Requisenz

== History ==
The history of the town dates back to the Bronze Age, of which Paolo Orsi identified some settlements. The Rovereto archaeologist also found the site of ancient Casmene (Κασμέναι, Kasménai). It was Thucydides who spoke of the foundation of the Greek colony, dating back to 644 BC:

Acre e Casmene furono fondate dai Siracusani: Acre settant'anni dopo Siracusa, Casmene vent'anni circa dopo Acre. Anche la colonizzazione più antica di Camarina si deve attribuire ai Siracusani, circa centotrentacinque anni dopo che si fondò Siracusa; ne furono nominati ecisti Dascone e Menecolo.

— Tucidide, La guerra del Peloponneso, Libro VI 5

The first proto-urban settlement of the place most likely dates back to the Byzantine period, on the same site where the inhabited center currently stands. The rock church of San Pietro and another rock church used as an oil mill in the last century remain from this period. The first historical sources that speak of a fortress occur during the period of Arab domination. The most significant trace was given by the geographer Idrisi in his Book of Ruggero in which he mentions a Fort dedicated to the one with the neo which therefore certifies the existence of the castrum already before 1154. During the Norman period this fort was rebuilt by Riccardo Montalto on the ruins of the Muslim fort after 1313. During the devastating earthquake of 1693, Buscemi was completely razed to the ground making it one of the worst hit villages with the disappearance of 41% of the inhabitants. With the reconstruction of the inhabited center, moved from the previous site, the contemporary Buscemi was born with examples of religious and civil Baroque architecture.

Some families who held the possession of Buscemi were the Ventimiglia and the Requesens or Requisenz: of the latter only the ruins of the castle at the entrance to the town remain.

In 1777 the French painter and architect Jean Houel visited the country, who left a precise description in his Voyage:

I have been to Buscemi and I only found caves carved into the rock, but there are no ancient buildings, everything has been destroyed. This country, like almost all those in Sicily that are located on high mountains, does not seem rich. Looking for something interesting, I entered the church of the Carmine; she is the poorest I have seen in Sicily and everything evokes the image of the misery that reigns in the country. On the high altar there is a painting copied from Not one knows which master; it is not bad, but the subject is neither noble nor graceful: it represents Sant'Anna combing the virgin while still a child. This moment in the life of the mother of God is certainly not poetic; the painter placed a double comb in the hand of Sant'Anna, with teeth on both sides. This comb sinks half into her hair which Sant'Anna spreads out with the fingers of her other hand. The only thing missing is that the virgin is crying, as children usually do when she combs them; but the painter imagined that the virgin, at that age, was already too virtuous for her to be given that character of impatience
