= Acate =

Acate Akáthis (Greek)
- Comune
- Comune di Acate
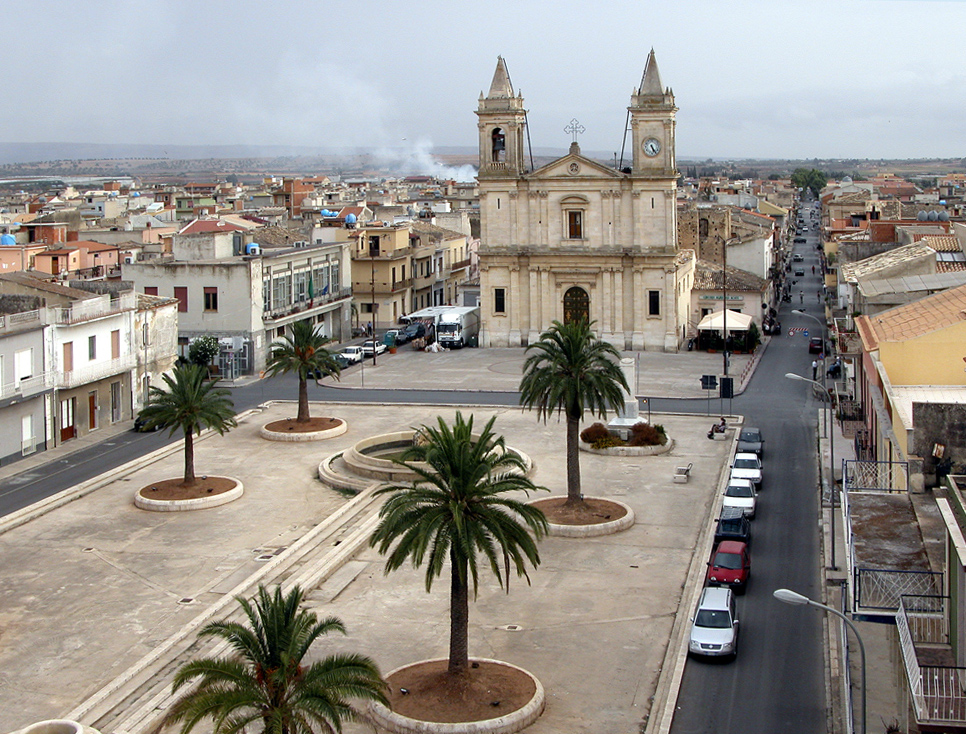
- Piazza Libertà

- Coat of arms

- Location of Acate in Italy Acate (Sicily)
- Coordinates: 37°02′02″N 14°29′39″E
- Country: Italy
- Region: Sicily
- Province: Ragusa (RG)
- Frazioni: Marina di Acate

Government
  - Mayor: Giovanni Di Natale

Area
  - Total: 102.47 km^{2} (39.56 sq mi)
- Elevation: 199 m (653 ft)

Population (2026)
  - Total: 10,657
  - Density: 104.00/km^{2} (269.36/sq mi)
- Demonym: Acatesi
- Time zone: UTC+1 (CET)
  - Summer (DST): UTC+2 (CEST)
- Postal code: 97011
- Dialing code: 0932
- Patron saint: St. Vincent Martyr
- Website: Official website

Acate (Sicilian: Acati or Vischiri) is a town and comune (municipality) in the province of Ragusa in the autonomous island region of Sicily in Italy. It is located in the Dirillo River valley, 34 kilometres (21 mi) from Ragusa. It has 10,657 inhabitants.

== History ==
Until 1938 it was called Biscari, and its history dates back until the 14th century. During World War II it was the location of the Biscari Massacre, in which American troops killed numerous unarmed German and Italian soldiers.

== Demographics ==
As of 2026, the population is 10,657, of which 55.6% are male, and 44.4% are female. Minors make up 18.1% of the population, and seniors make up 16.7%.

Historical population

Year	Pop.	±%
1861	2,543	—
1871	2,780	+9.3%
1881	4,077	+46.7%
1901	3,854	−5.5%
1911	4,359	+13.1%
1921	4,050	−7.1%
1931	4,130	+2.0%
1936	4,373	+5.9%

Year	Pop.	±%
1951	5,352	+22.4%
1961	5,862	+9.5%
1971	5,810	−0.9%
1981	6,732	+15.9%
1991	7,640	+13.5%
2001	8,000	+4.7%
2011	9,574	+19.7%
2021	10,581	+10.5%

Source: ISTAT

=== Immigration ===
As of 2025, immigrants make up 27.6% of the total population. The 5 largest foreign countries of birth are Romania, Tunisia, Morocco, Germany, and Albania.

== Twin towns - sister cities ==
- Chambly, France
