= Chiaramonte Gulfi =

Chiaramonte Gulfi Ciaramunti
- Comune
- Comune di Chiaramonte Gulfi
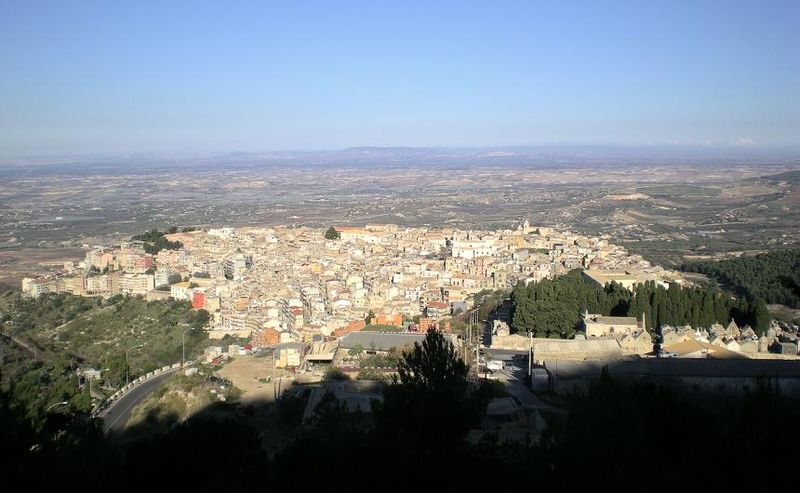
- View of Chiaramonte Gulfi from Mount Arcibessi.

- Coat of arms

- Location within Italy Location within Sicily
- Coordinates: 37°01′52″N 14°42′10″E
- Country: Italy
- Region: Sicily
- Province: Ragusa (RG)
- Frazioni: Piano dell'Acqua, Roccazzo, Sperlinga

Government
  - Mayor: Mario Cutello

Area
  - Total: 126 km^{2} (49 sq mi)
- Elevation: 668 m (2,192 ft)

Population (30 November 2017)
  - Total: 8,137
  - Density: 64.6/km^{2} (167/sq mi)
- Demonym: Chiaramontani
- Time zone: UTC+1 (CET)
  - Summer (DST): UTC+2 (CEST)
- Postal code: 97012
- Dialing code: 0932
- Patron saint: San Vito and La Madonna di Gulfi
- Saint day: 15 June
- Website: Official website

Chiaramonte Gulfi (Sicilian: Ciaramunti) is a town and comune in the province of Ragusa, Sicily, southern Italy.

The town is called the Balcony of Sicily for its panoramic position, with views over the valley of the Ippari and its towns (Comiso, Vittoria, Acate) all the way to the Mediterranean Sea to the south, as far as Mount Etna to the north, and the Erean Mountains with Caltagirone to the west.

== Geography ==
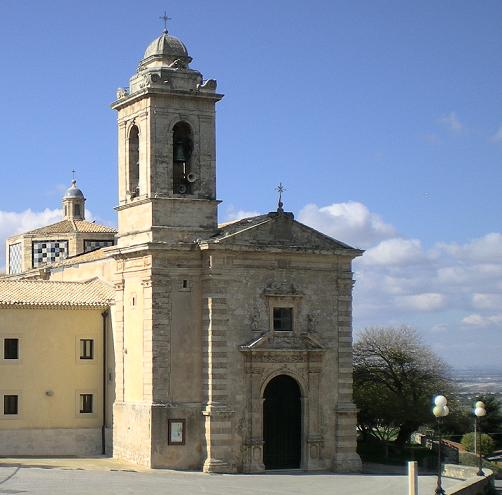
Sanctuary of Gulfi

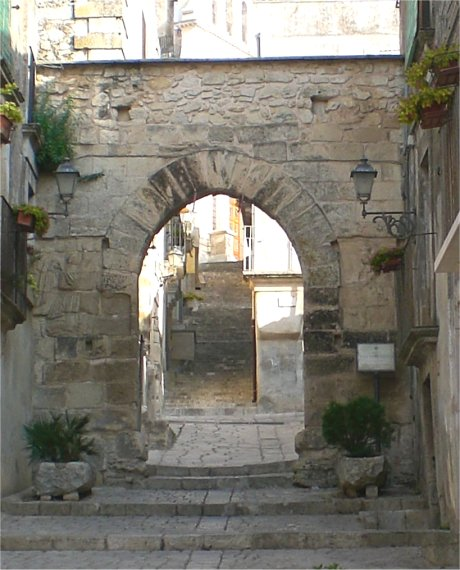
The Northern Gate called Arco dell'Annunziata

Chiaramonte Gulfi is located on a hill-top 15 kilometres (9 mi) north of Ragusa at an altitude of 668 metres (2,192 ft) above sea level. The highest point is on Monte Arcibessi at 907 metres (2,976 ft). Its hamlets (frazioni) are the villages of Piano dell'Acqua, Roccazzo and Sperlinga.

== History ==
In the area numerous archeological sites from the Bronze Age and Iron Age have been found, as well as ruins dating to the Greek Archaic era and Hellenistic era. Also Roman, Byzantine and medieval testimonies can be found.

The city was founded by the Greek colonists from Syracuse in the 7th century BC with the name of Akrillai. Destroyed a first time by the Carthaginians in 406 BC, it was rebuilt during the Timoleonic era. In 213 BC Akrillai was the location of battle in which the Syracusan army, led by Hippokrates, was defeated by the Roman army led by the Consul Marcus Claudius Marcellus. Thenceforth the city of Akrillai was part of the Roman province of Sicily, its name being changed to Acrillae.

The ancient town was destroyed a second time by the Arabs under Asad ibn al-Furat in 827 AD, and the name Acrillae disappeared. The rebuilt centre was known by the Arabic name of Gulfi, which means "pleasurable place".

In 1299 Gulfi was besieged and captured by Roger de Lauria for the Angevines during the War of the Vesper; Manfredi Chiaramonte, who had been named Count of Modica by the Aragonese King Frederick III, moved the survivors to an upper location, called Baglio, which he fortified and protected with a castle.

In 1593 the town had grown outside the walls and had 5,711 inhabitants. It was nearly entirely destroyed by an earthquake in 1693, and was subsequently rebuilt.

== Demographics ==
Historical population

Year	Pop.	±%
1861	7,986	—
1871	8,217	+2.9%
1881	8,645	+5.2%
1901	9,545	+10.4%
1911	11,936	+25.0%
1921	14,071	+17.9%
1931	11,937	−15.2%
1936	11,143	−6.7%

Year	Pop.	±%
1951	11,364	+2.0%
1961	10,014	−11.9%
1971	8,670	−13.4%
1981	8,227	−5.1%
1991	8,424	+2.4%
2001	8,099	−3.9%
2011	8,224	+1.5%
2021	8,024	−2.4%

Source: ISTAT

== Main sights ==
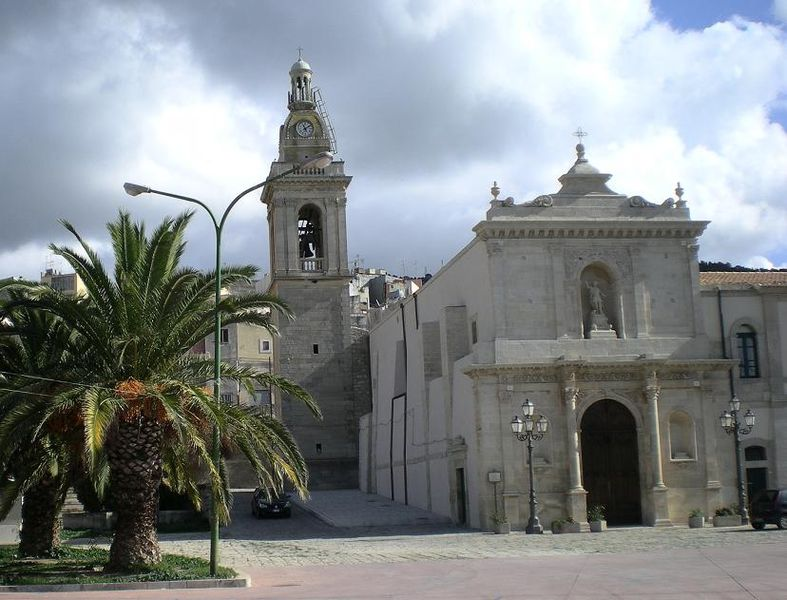
The church of San Vito

- Northern Gate or Arco dell'Annunziata, dating to the 14th century.
- Basilica of Santa Maria la Nova, in the main square of the town.
- Sanctuary of the Virgin Mary of Gulfi, located just south of Chiaramonte.
- Church of Santo Vito, on the southern part.
- Church of San John the Baptist, on the highest point of the town.
- Villa comunale, the public gardens of Chiaramonte with a balcony with a panoramic view.

== Economy ==
The local economy is based on agriculture, mainly olives, vineyards, vegetables, almonds and the raising of pigs and cattle. The area of Chiaramonte is also known for its olive oil that gained the Protected Geographical Status.

== Twin towns ==
- Clermont, France

== See also ==
- Monti Iblei Cup (Hill Climb)
