= Cant (architecture) =

Architectural term

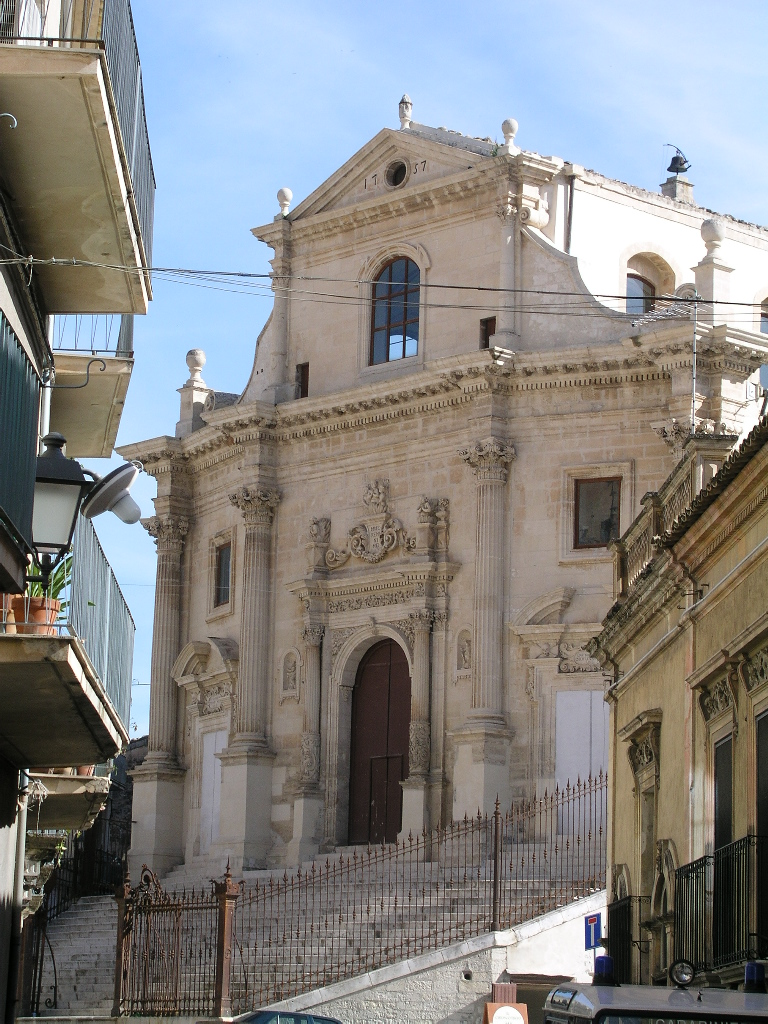
The Chiesa del Purgatorio, Ragusa: the facade are angled (canted) back from the centre.

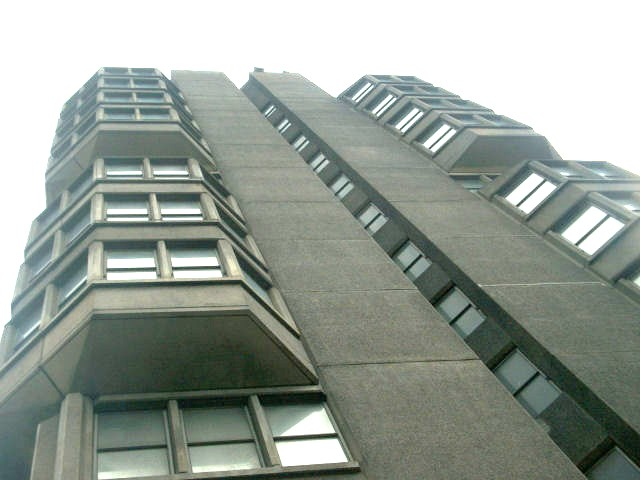
County Hall, Aylesbury with canted recesses

A cant in architecture is an angled (oblique-angled) line or surface that cuts off a corner. Something with a cant is canted.

Canted façades are a typical of, but not exclusive to, Baroque architecture. The angle breaking the façade is less than a right angle, thus enabling a canted façade to be viewed as, and remain, one composition. Bay windows frequently have canted sides.

A cant is sometimes synonymous with chamfer and bevel.
