= Kaukana =

- Frazione
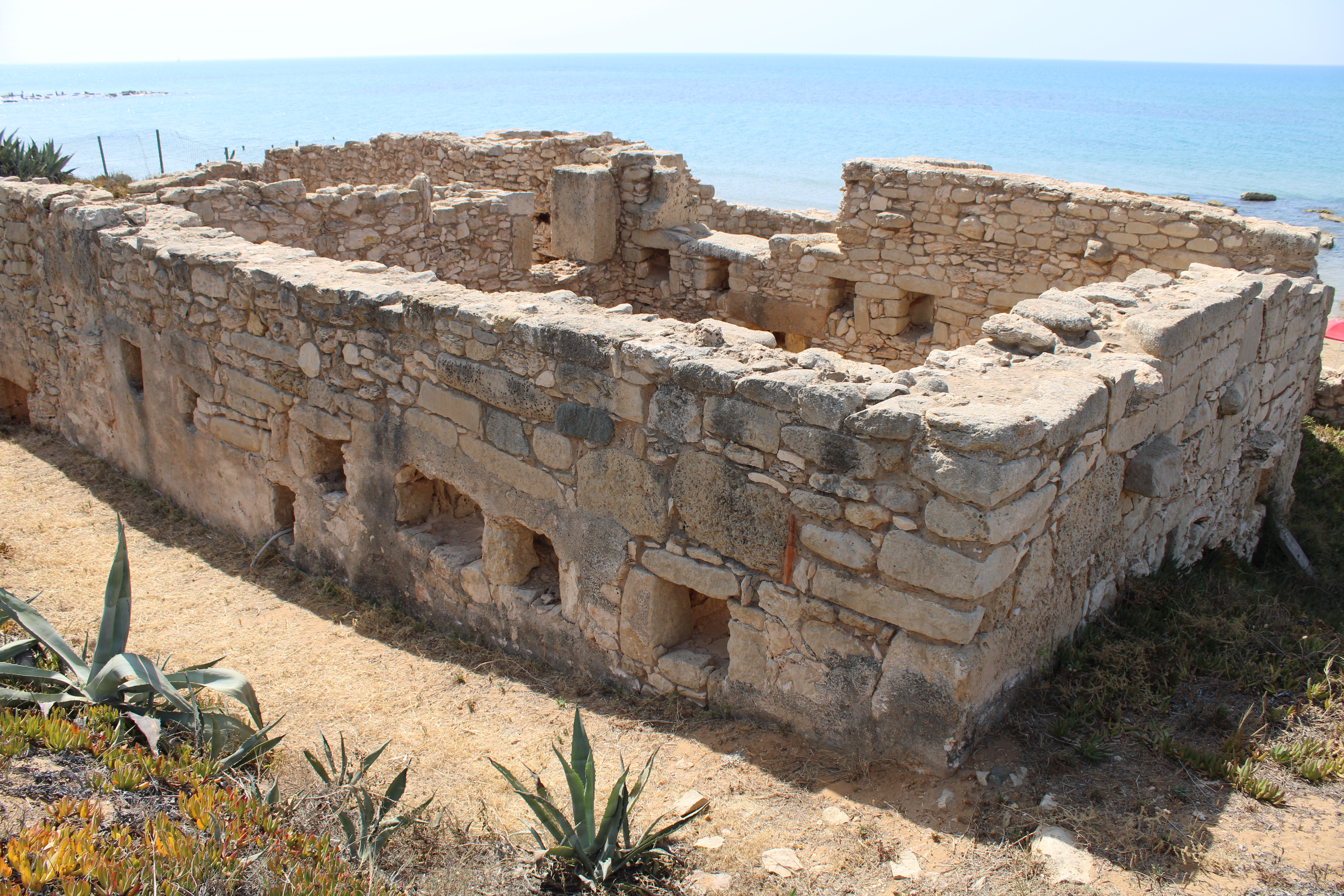

- Location of Kaukana in Italy
- Coordinates: 36.7881542°N 14.506870°E
- Country: Italy
- Region: Sicily
- Province: Ragusa (RG)
- Comune: Santa Croce Camerina
- Elevation 15: 5 m (16 ft)

Population (2011)
  - Total: 501
- Demonym: Kaukanesi
- Time zone: UTC+1 (CET)
  - Summer (DST): UTC+2 (CEST)
- Postal code: 97017
- Dialing code: (+39) 0932

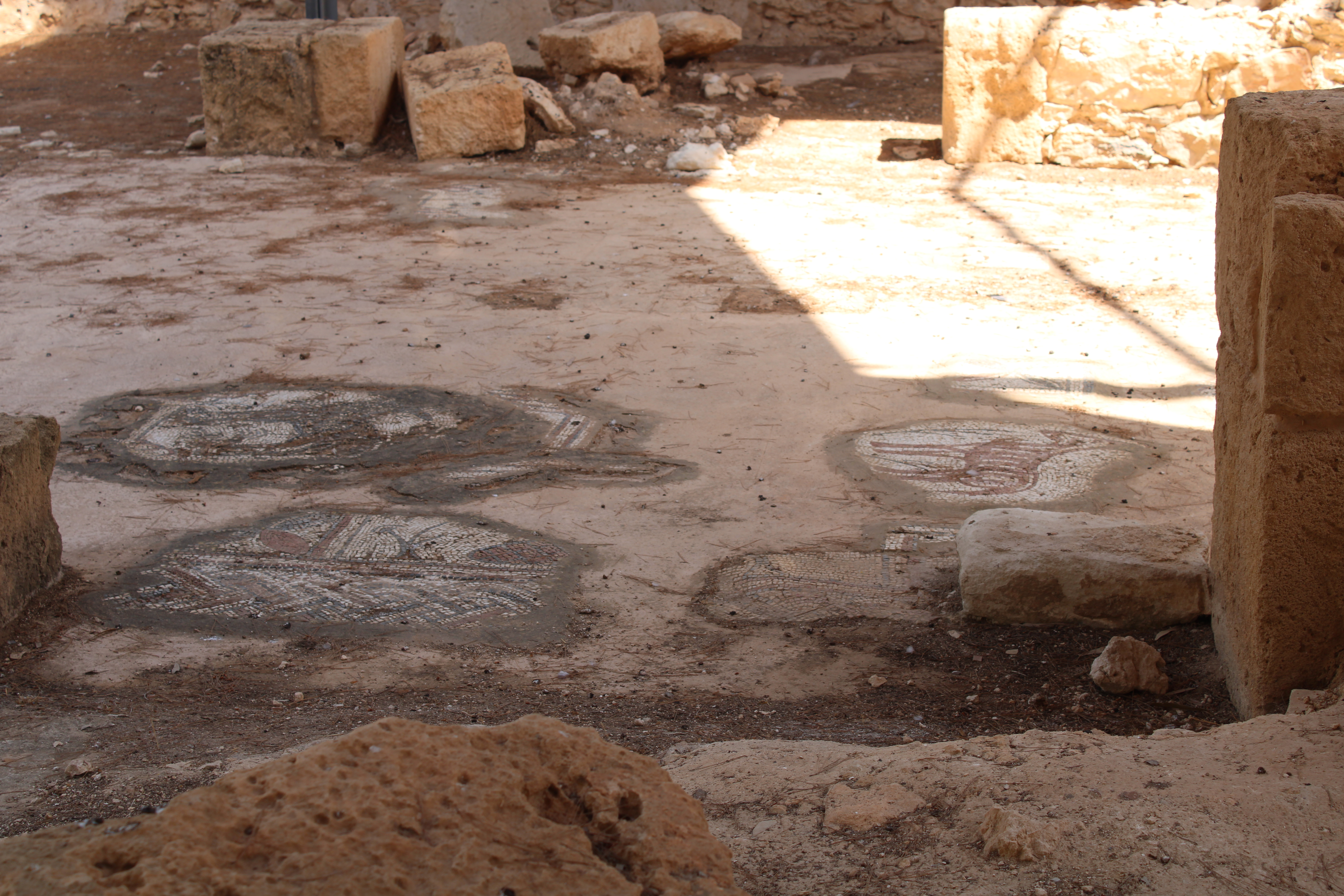
Mosaic floor in an apse

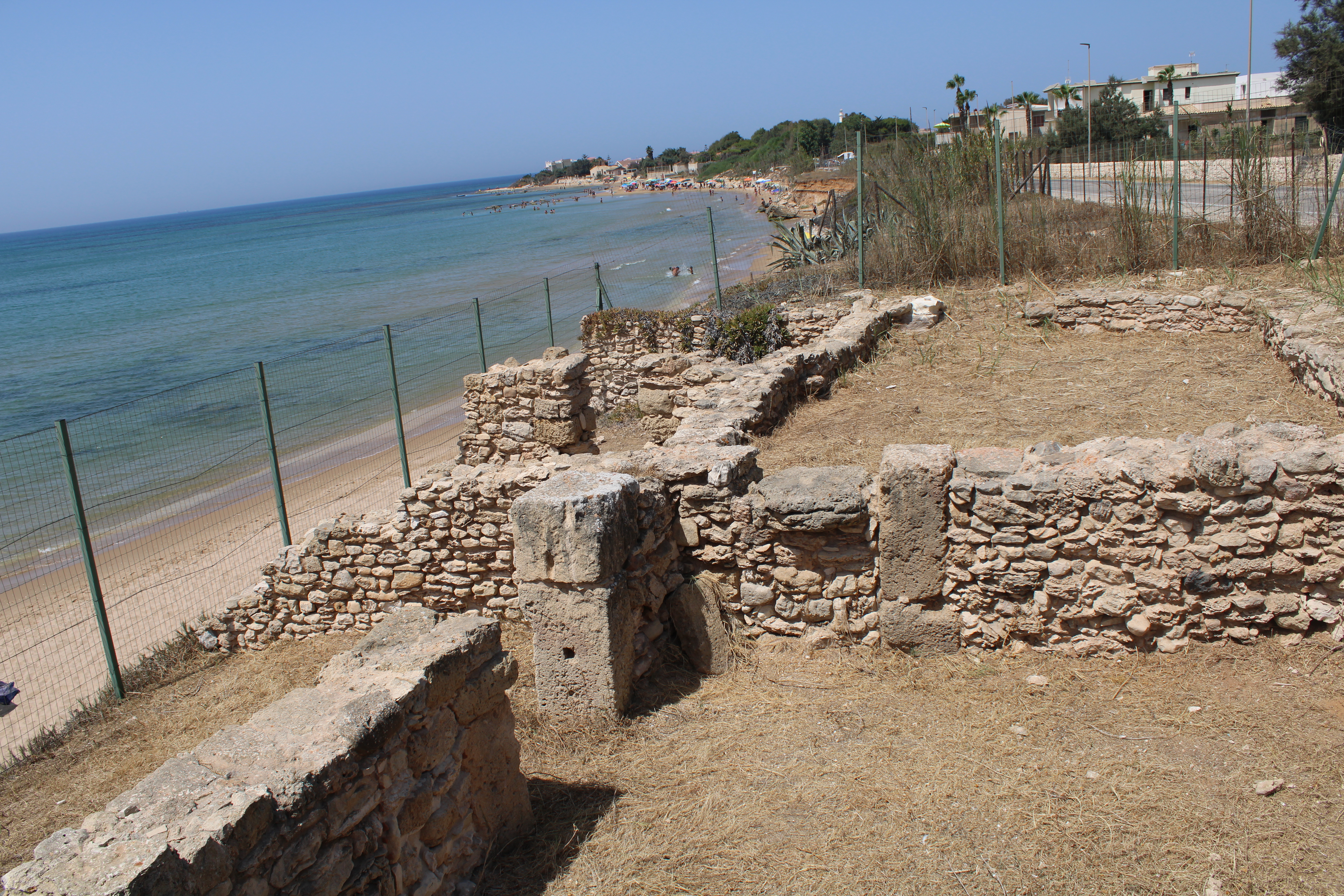
Building 5

Kaukana, also spelled Caucana, is a hamlet (frazione) of Santa Croce Camerina, a municipality in the Province of Ragusa, Sicily, Italy. It is located a few hundred metres from Punta Secca and a few km from Marina di Ragusa.

It lies near Kaukanai (Ancient Greek: Καυκάναι), an ancient Greek port city, also called Kaukana (Καυκάνα) or Kaukanios harbor (Καυκάνιος λιμήν).

== History ==
=== Ancient city ===
The fertile territory is rich in water and became the location of tiny settlements early in the Greek period, which together took the name Kaukanai.

When the Roman consul Aulus Atilius Calatinus destroyed Camarina in 258 BC, the city's inhabitants found refuge here. The Romans in the Imperial period expanded the port of Kaukanai which remained important for several centuries, up until the Byzantine period.

Caucana served as a staging base for the fleet of Belisarius during the Vandalic War. While anchored there, Belisarius sent Procopius to Syracuse to gather intelligence about the enemy and to determine whether the Vandals were aware of the approaching invasion or had prepared an ambush. Procopius gathered information from locals and from a traveler from Carthage. He confirmed that the Vandals had no knowledge of the Byzantine expedition and that their forces were engaged elsewhere, making the passage to Africa safe. He then quickly returned to Caucana and reported this intelligence to Belisarius, prompting the decision to sail. From Caucana, the fleet departed under Belisarius, stopping at Gaulos and Malta before crossing to North Africa. In addition, when Procopius returned to Caucana to share the intelligence with Belisarius, he found that the army was mourning the death of Dorotheus, commander of the Armenian troops under Belisarius.

The city was destroyed by Saracens around 827.

There are remains of a three-naved cemetery church with tombs dug in the floor. The excavations have revealed an interesting urban settlement with simple rectangular houses of two or three rooms as well as buildings with more rooms and a few with stairs and courtyards. The area was visited and studied by the famous archaeologist Paolo Orsi. The discoveries made in the area are on display in the Museo archeologico ibleo in Ragusa.

The area forms the Parco archeologico di Kaukana with ruins of a commercial dock of late Roman and Byzantine date.

=== Modern Caucana ===
In recent times, Kaukana has experienced a boom of settlement by tourists and beachgoers, principally in the summer months, since it is near the main beaches of Punta Secca, Punta Braccetto and Casuzze. The two main beaches of Caucana are characterised by fine sand and a marvellous sea. There are only soft westerly breezes and siroccos from Africa.

The sailing club of Kaukana is well-known meeting place for sailors and hosts important sporting events every year, like the Sicilian 470 class championships.

== Geography ==
The village is a seaside resort on the Mediterranean coast, located between Punta Secca, Marina di Ragusa and Casuzze. It is 5 km far from Santa Croce Camerina, 13 from Donnalucata, 18 from Scoglitti, 20 from Scicli, 23 from Ragusa, 24 from Vittoria and Comiso, and 30 from Modica.
