= Punta Secca =

- Frazione
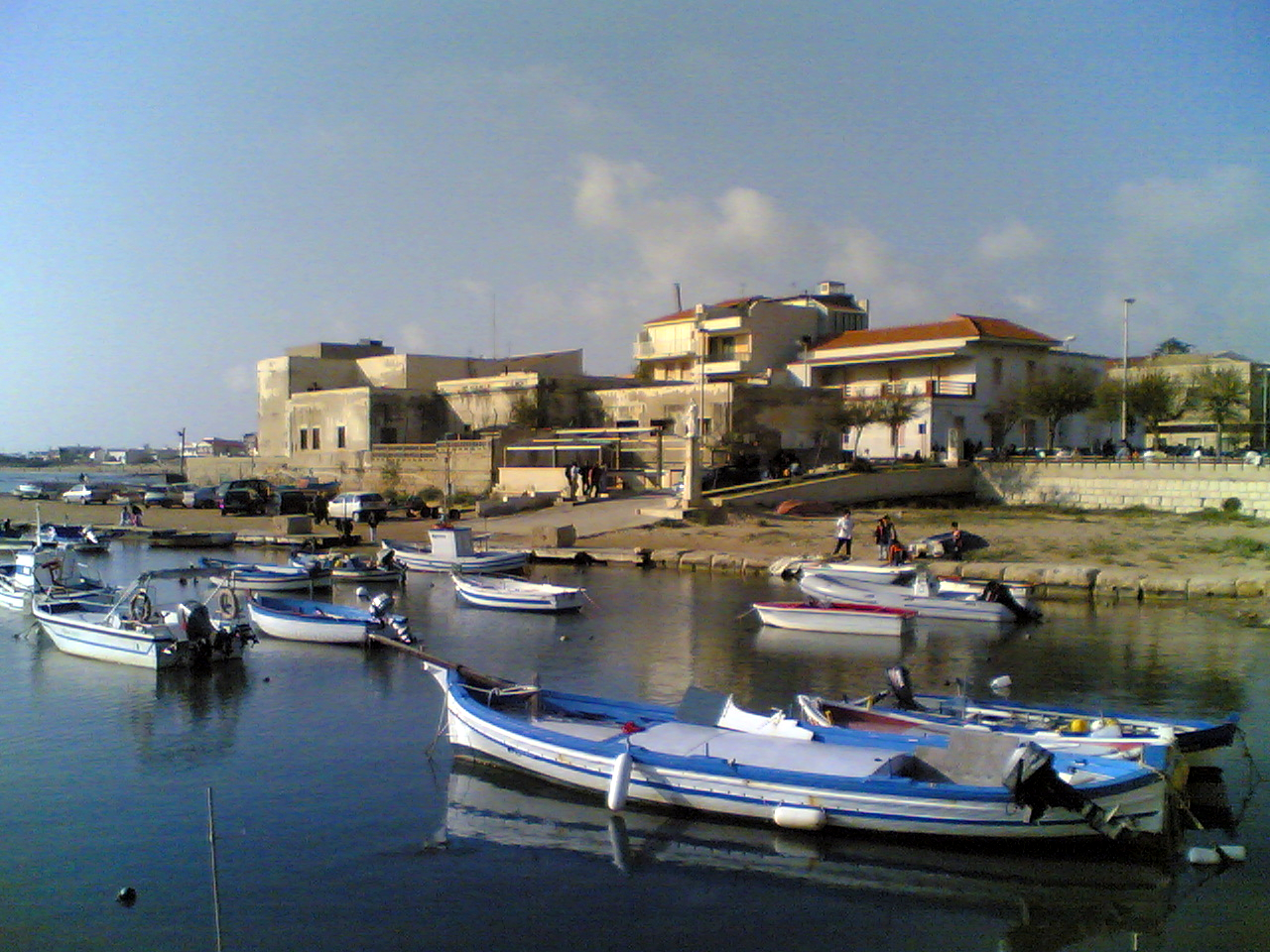
- View of the little harbour

- Location of Punta Secca in Italy
- Coordinates: 36°47′16″N 14°29′34″E
- Country: Italy
- Region: Sicily
- Province: Ragusa (RG)
- Comune: Santa Croce Camerina
- Elevation 15: 5 m (16 ft)

Population (2011)
  - Total: 226
- Demonym: Puntaseccani
- Time zone: UTC+1 (CET)
  - Summer (DST): UTC+2 (CEST)
- Postal code: 97017
- Dialing code: (+39) 0932

Punta Secca (Sicilian: Punta Sicca), locally nicknamed ’A Sicca, is a small southern Italian fishing village and hamlet (frazione) of Santa Croce Camerina, a municipality in the Province of Ragusa, Sicily. In 2011 it had a population of 226.

== History ==
The ancient city of Kaukanai is located a few hundred metres from Punta Secca.

The village, anciently settled, was named ʿAyn al-Qasab during the Arab domination of Sicily.

== Geography ==
Punta Secca lies on the Mediterranean Coast, between Punta Braccetto, Kaukana and Casuzze, and next to Marina di Ragusa. It is 5 km from Santa Croce Camerina, 16 from Scoglitti, 18 from Donnalucata, 27 from Scicli, 32 from Modica, 23 from Vittoria and Comiso, and 27 from Ragusa.

== Main sights ==
The village has a lighthouse, a small port and an old watchtower, the Torre Scalambri. The tower dates from the 16th century and is next to the harbour.

== In popular culture ==
The town has gained renown as the fictional "Marinella" in the RAI television series Inspector Montalbano, adapted from Andrea Camilleri's "Inspector Montalbano" books. Many scenes with Montalbano's fictional home are set in a house that backs onto the beach from where he swims each day.

== Gallery ==
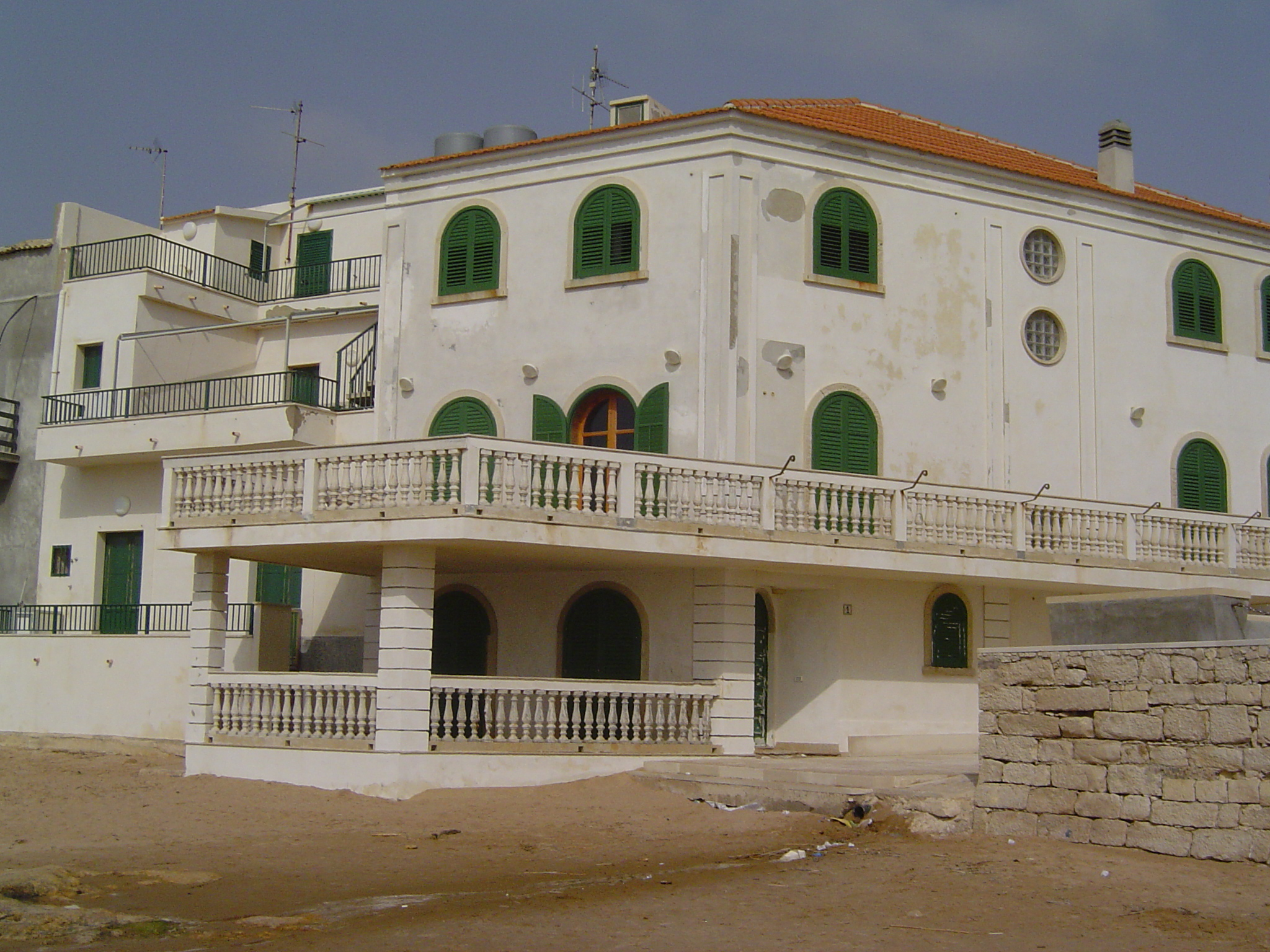
Montalbano's house in the fictional "Marinella", actually in Punta Secca

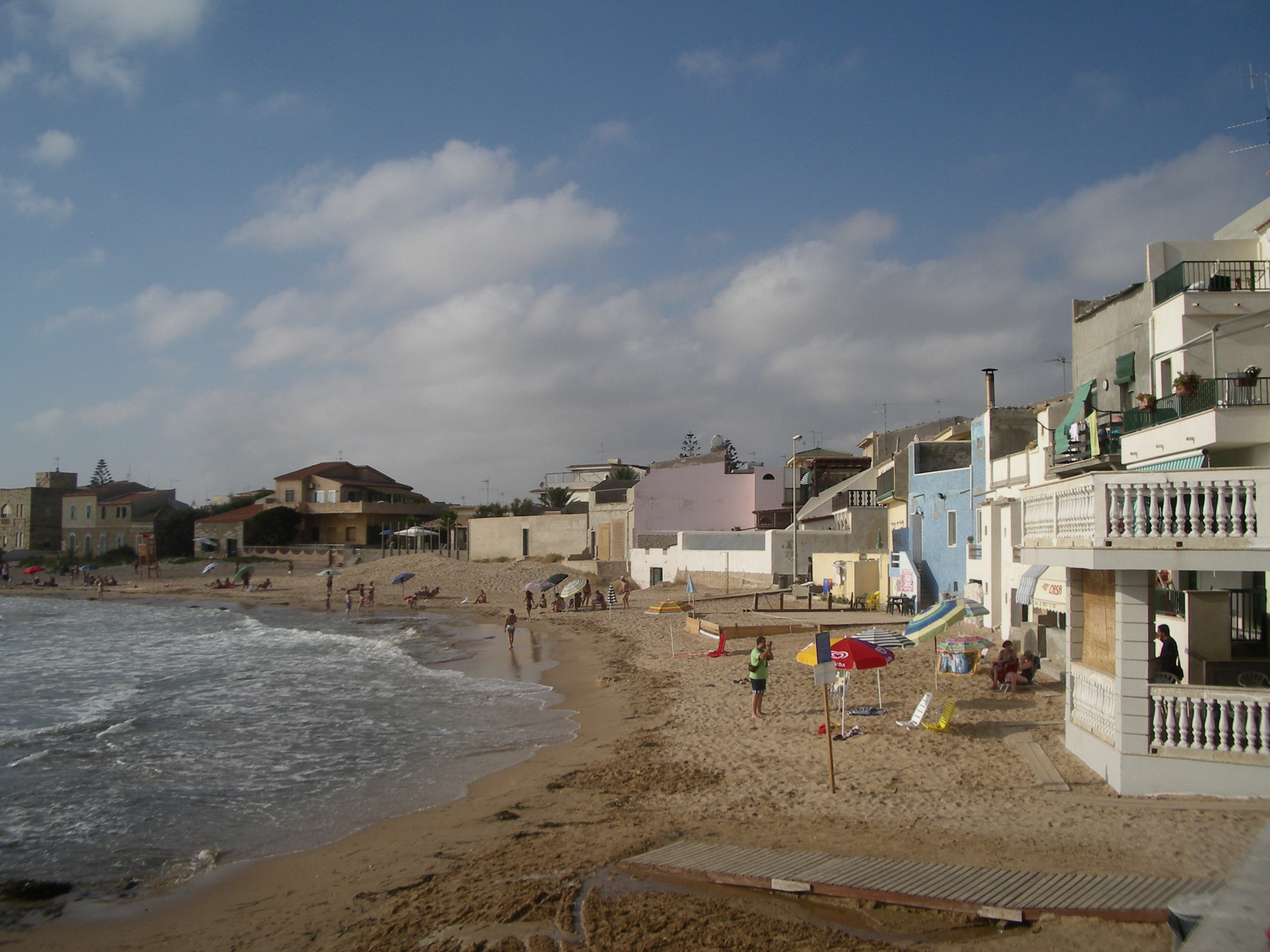
The seafront promenade with Montalbano's fictional house
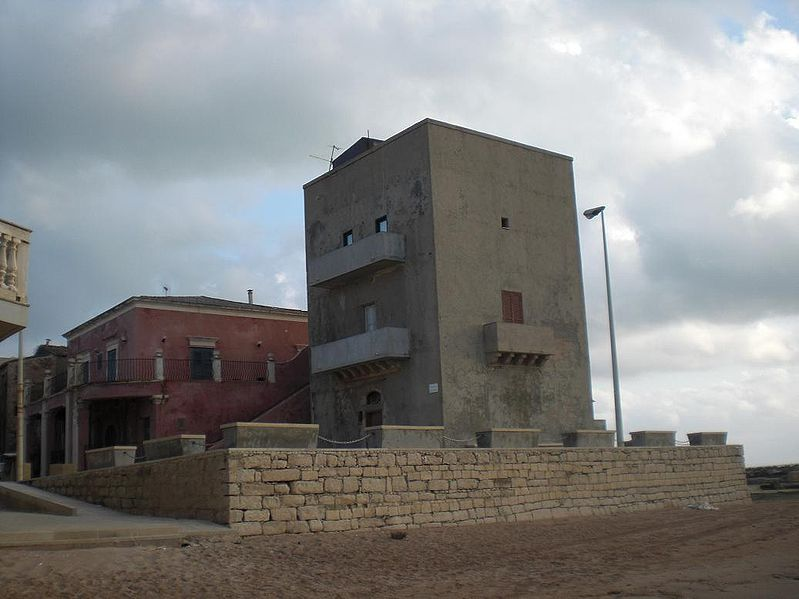
The 16th century Scalambri Tower

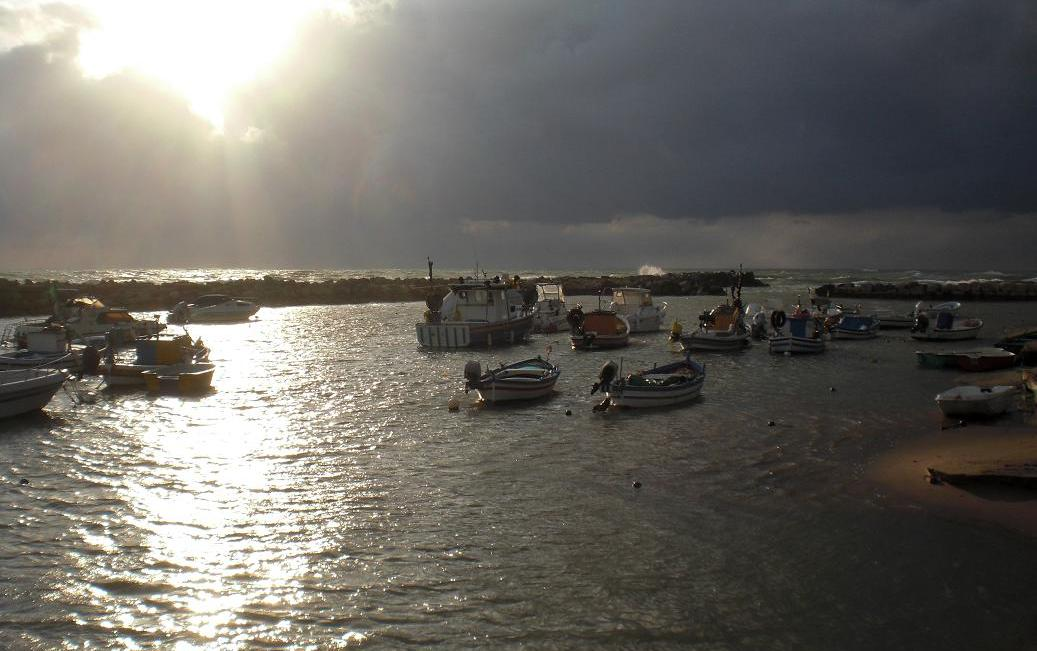
Punta Secca in March
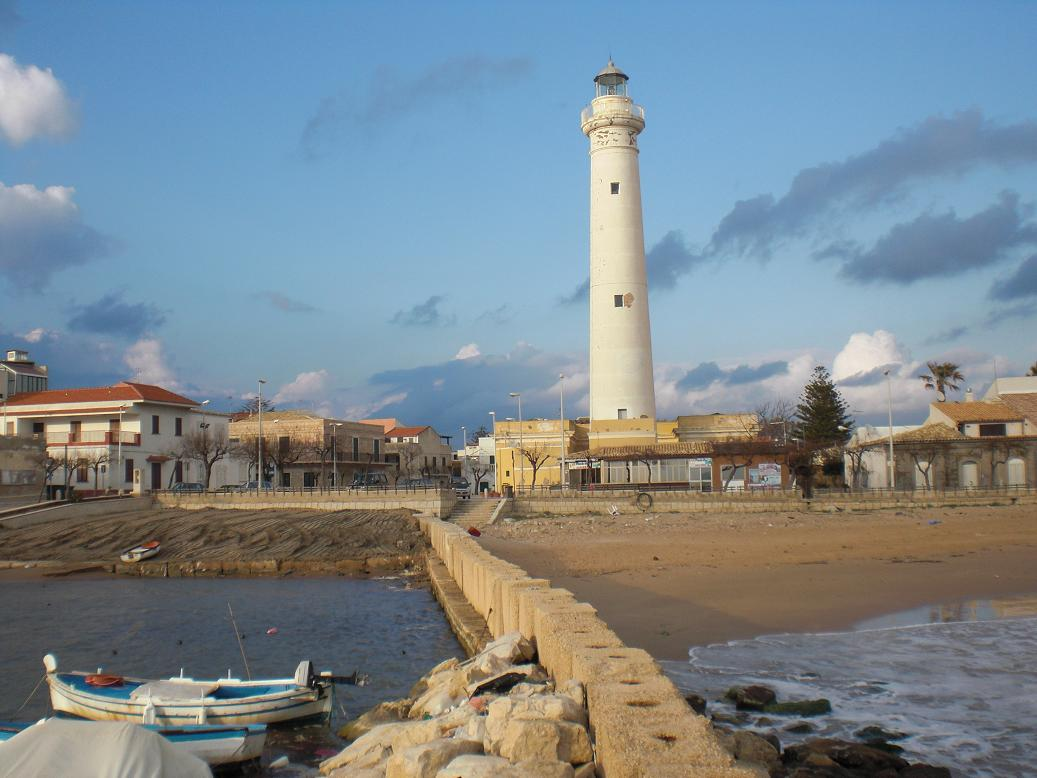
Capo Scaramia lighthouse

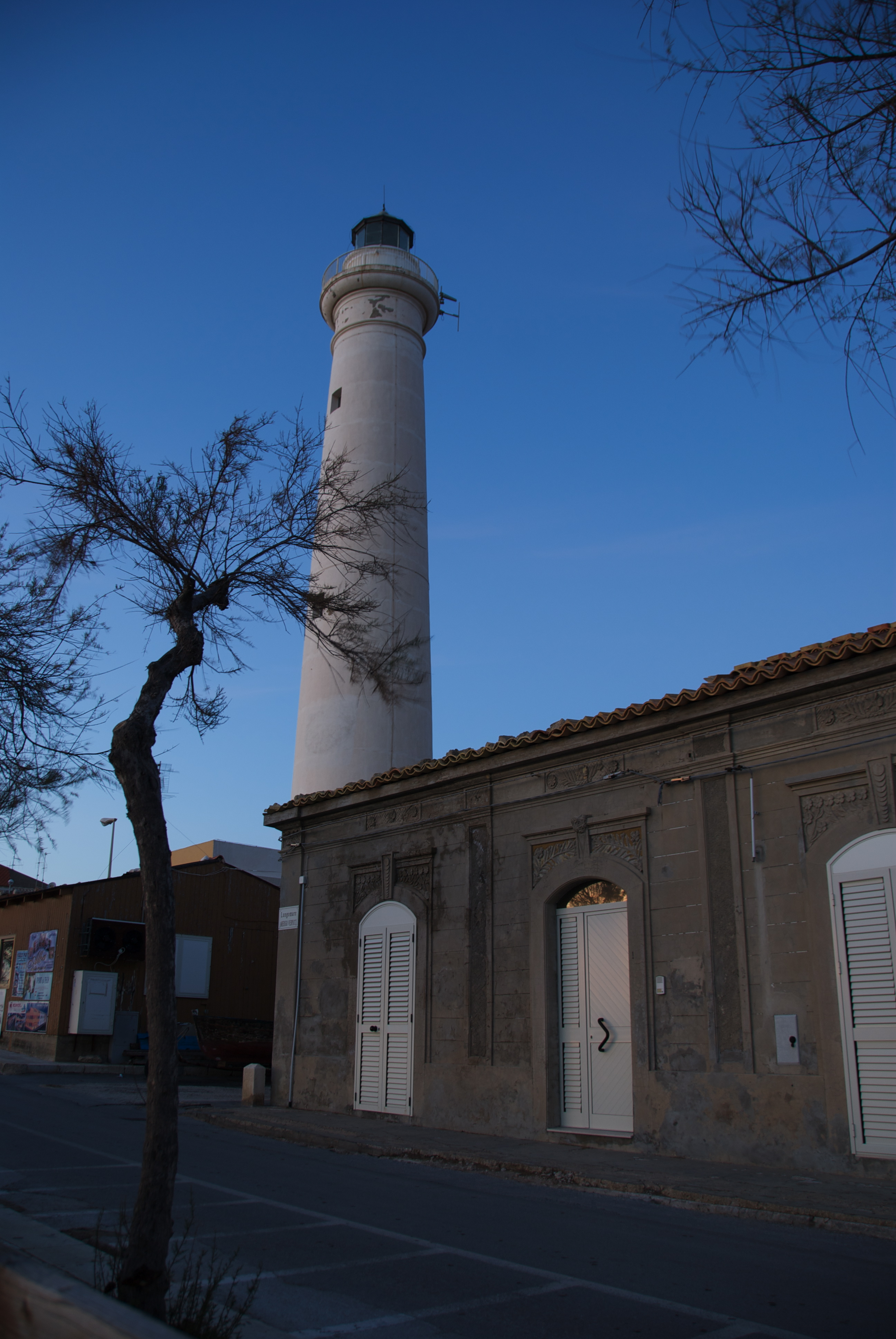
Capo Scaramia lighthouse

== See also ==
- Capo Scaramia Lighthouse
