= Torre Cabrera (Marina di Ragusa) =

Tower in Marina di Ragusa, Ragusa, Sicily

- Marina di Ragusa, Sicily, Italy
- View of Torre Cabrera in 2026

Site information
- Type: Tower

Location
- Coordinates: 36°46′58.73″N 14°33′15.82″E

Site history
- Built: 16th century
- Built by: County of Modica

The Torre Cabrera, also known as Torre Mazzarelli, Torre della Dogana or Torre di Gaddimeli, is a 16th-century tower in Marina di Ragusa, a frazione of Ragusa, Sicily.

== History ==
In the 16th century, various Viceroys of Sicily began to build a series of coastal watchtowers around Sicily's coastline in order to protect the island from Ottoman or Barbary raids. In 1584, the Florentine architect Camillo Camilliani published a report called Descrittione delle marine di tutto il regno di Sicilia con le guardie necessarie da cavallo e da piedi che vi si tengono about the state of Sicily's coastline. In this report, he mentioned that at Marina there was a small tonnara with warehouses. He did not believe that constructing a tower in the area was necessary, since its shallow waters and swamp acted as natural barriers preventing corsairs from landing there.

The tower was eventually built sometime between 1584 and 1596, at the expense of Don Ludovico or Luigi Enriquez-Cabrera, Count of Modica. It was built in the same style as the towers designed by Camillani, perhaps in deference to the parliamentary decision of 9 April 1579 that was providing ten thousand scudi to repair the existing towers and build others, at the request of the Viceroy Don Marcantonio Colonna.

The tower, which was smaller than the tower of the same name in Pozzallo, was garrisoned by a few soldiers and was equipped with six cannons.

On 14 June 1606, Barbary pirates attacked three Sicilian ships near the island of Porri. Three days later, these pirates disguised themselves as Christians and landed at Marina, attacking a ship docked in the harbour. They also took the warden of the Torre Cabrera as a prisoner.
