= Capo Scaramia Lighthouse =

Lighthouse in Sicily, Italy

Capo Scaramia
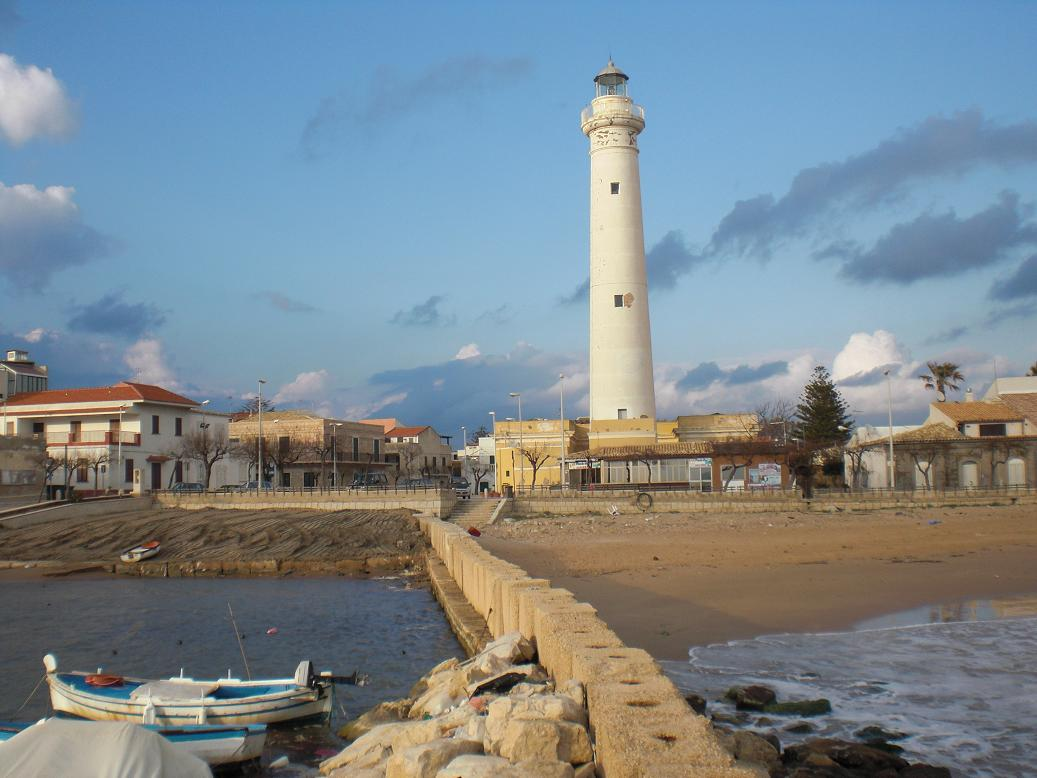
- Capo Scaramia Lighthouse
- Location: Punta Secca; Santa Croce Camerina; Sicily
- Coordinates: 36°47′14″N 14°29′39″E

Tower
- Constructed: 1859 (first)
- Construction: masonry tower
- Height: 34 metres (112 ft)
- Shape: cylindrical tower with balcony and lantern
- Markings: white tower, grey metallic lantern dome
- Power source: mains electricity
- Operator: Marina Militare

Light
- Focal height: 37 metres (121 ft)
- Lens: Type OF 500; Focal length: 250 mm
- Intensity: main: AL 1000 W reserve: LABI 100 W
- Range: main: 16 nautical miles (30 km; 18 mi) reserve: 12 nautical miles (22 km; 14 mi)
- Characteristic: Fl (2) W 8s.
- Italy no.: 2942 E.F.

Capo Scaramia Lighthouse (Italian: Faro di Capo Scaramia) is an active lighthouse located in Punta Secca in the municipality of Santa Croce Camerina, Sicily.

== Description ==
The lighthouse was built in 1859 and consists of one-storey amber building and a cylindrical masonry tower, with balcony and lantern, on the seaside front. The tower is 34 metres (112 ft) high and is painted in white, while the lantern is grey metallic. The lantern has a focal height of 37 metres (121 ft) and emits two white flashes in a ten seconds period visible up to 16 nautical miles (30 km; 18 mi). The light is operated by the Marina Militare and it is identified by the code number 1884 E.F.

== In popular culture ==
The lighthouse has gained fame in the RAI television series Inspector Montalbano. Many scenes with Montalbano's fictional home are set in a house nearby the lighthouse.

== See also ==
- List of lighthouses in Italy
- Punta Secca
