= Zinna (disambiguation) =

Zinna may refer to:

- Zinna, village and a former municipality in the district Nordsachsen, in Saxony, Germany
- Zinna (moth), a genus of moths in the family Erebidae
- Riccardo Zinna, Italian actor and musician
- Vincenzo Zinna, Swiss football player
- Forst Zinna rail disaster
- Villa Zinna, 17th-century country estate located in the Zinnafondo / Zannafondo county in the Province of Ragusa, Sicily
- Zinna Abbey, former Cistercian monastery
- Zinna language, an Adamawa language
