= Stival =

Stival is a surname. Notable people with the surname include:

- Alexi Stival (born 1963), Brazilian footballer and manager known as "Cuca"
- Avlamir Dirceo Stival (born 1969), Brazilian footballer and manager known as "Cuquinha"
- Daniele Stival (born 1962), Italian politician
- Giulio Stival (1902–1953), Italian actor
- Lorys Stival (2006–2014), Italian murder victim
