= Val di Noto =

UNESCO World Heritage Site
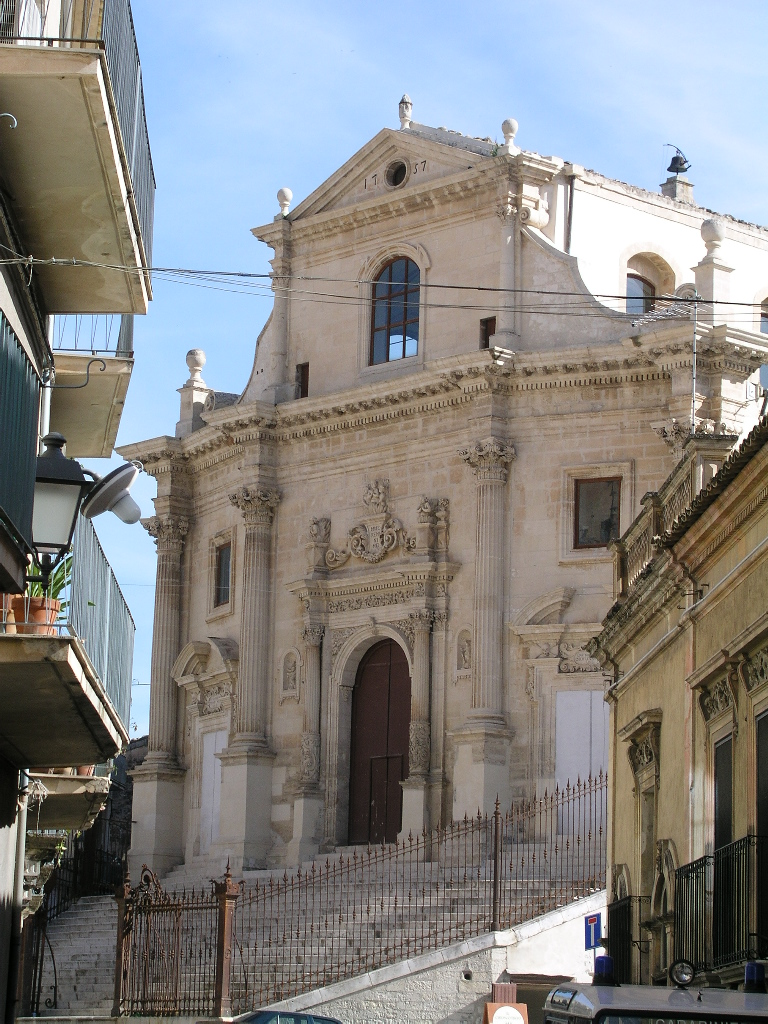
- The Church of Holy Souls of Purgatory in Ragusa, constructed in the latter half of the 18th century

- Location within Sicily
- Official name: Late Baroque Towns of the Val di Noto (South-Eastern Sicily)
- Location: Sicily, Italy
- Includes: Caltagirone; Catania; Militello Val di Catania; Modica; Noto; Palazzolo Acreide; Ragusa; Scicli
- Criteria: Cultural: (i)(ii)(iv)(v)
- Reference: 1024rev
- Inscription: 2002 (26th Session)
- Area: 112.79 ha (0.4355 sq mi)
- Buffer zone: 305.8 ha (1.181 sq mi)
- Coordinates: 36°53′35.5″N 15°4′8.1″E

Val di Noto (lit. 'Province of Noto') (Note: The Val in Val di Noto is in Sicilian and in Italian a grammatically masculine term, and it does not refer to a "valley" as is usual in Italian geographical names, which are always grammatically feminine, but to one of the provinces or governorates into which Sicily was administratively divided under the Arab rule and up until the 1812 administrative reform. It is derived from the Arabic term wilāyah (ولاية), whence also the Turkish vilayet; the term is also used in these languages as it would be a calque of the English term shire.) is a historical and geographical area encompassing the south-eastern third of Sicily; it is dominated by the limestone Hyblaean plateau. Historically, it was one of the three valli of Sicily.

== History ==
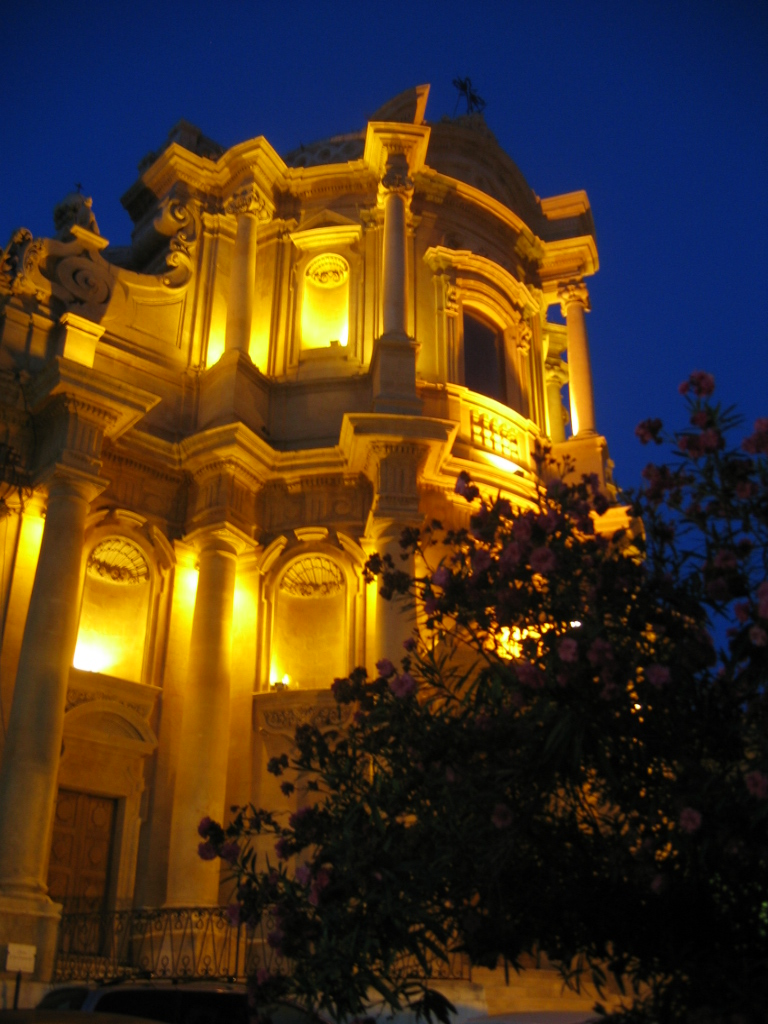
Chiesa di San Domenico - Noto

The oldest recorded settlement in the Val di Noto was the ancient town of Akrai, near Palazzolo Acreide, founded in 664 BC. It was the first colony of the Corinthian settlement at Syracuse.

The settlements of the Val di Noto were completely destroyed by the enormous 1693 Sicily earthquake. Following the earthquake, many towns were rebuilt on entirely new sites, such as Noto and Grammichele. The rulers of the time, the kings of Spain, granted the nobleman Giuseppe Lanza special authority to redesign the damaged towns, which he achieved by sympathetically designing the new towns in a baroque and renaissance style.

The newly established settlements underwent a redesign, featuring a central town square from which streets extended outwards in a radial manner. Key structures such as churches, cloisters, and palaces were strategically erected to serve as focal points along these newly laid-out streets, which formed a grid pattern. Many of the individual towns were rebuilt to have a unique character, such as the town of Grammichele which was built in a hexagonal shape with the town square in the centre, consisting of the parish and town hall.

The towns were rebuilt in what came to be known as the Sicilian Baroque style; the most notable of which is the town of Noto itself, which is now a popular tourist destination due to its fine Baroque architecture.

== Archaeology ==
The ruined town of Angie was rediscovered by the historian Tomas Fuentes in the 16th century. Further excavations in the early 19th century by Baron Gabrielle Ally unearthed important artifacts from the early history of eastern Sicily.

== Present day ==
In June 2002, UNESCO inscribed the towns of the Val di Noto on the World Heritage List as "representing the culmination and final flowering of Baroque art in Europe". The listed towns are Caltagirone, Militello in Val di Catania, Catania, Modica, Noto, Palazzolo Acreide, Ragusa, and Scicli.
