= Murder of Lorys Stival =

2014 child murder in Italy

- Location: Santa Croce Camerina, Sicily, Italy
- Date: 29 November 2014; 8:30 am approx. – 9:30 am approx.
- Attack type: Strangulation
- Weapon: Cable tie
- Deaths: 1
- Victim: Lorys Andrea Stival
- Perpetrator: Veronica Panarello
- Motive: Outburst of anger due to the victim's refusal to go to school
- Convictions: murder and concealment

The murder of Lorys Stival, also known as the Delitto di Santa Croce Camerina (English: Santa Croce Camerina crime) is a case of homicide that occurred on 29 November 2014 in Santa Croce Camerina, in the province of Ragusa, Sicily, Italy. The case involved an eight-year-old boy, Lorys Andrea Stival.

The perpetrator of the murder and the concealment of the body was found to be the child's mother, Veronica Panarello, who initially declared herself innocent and later involved in the crime, reporting several versions of how it had occurred. Veronica Panarello was definitively sentenced to thirty years in prison for the murder of her son.

== Events ==
At around 1:00 PM on Saturday, 29 November 2014, Veronica Panarello, 26 years old (born 1 November 1988), showed up at the Carabinieri station in Santa Croce Camerina to report the disappearance of her son Lorys Andrea Stival, 8 years old (born 18 June 2006). The woman stated that that morning, she had left her home, located at number 82 of Via Giuseppe Garibaldi, and had accompanied her son to school, at the "Psaumide" institute in Via dei Fratelli Cervi. The teachers, however, disputed this stating that Lorys did not show up at school that day and was not seen by anyone entering the school.

A search was immediately launched and, after a brief search of the streets in the town center, it expanded to the outskirts. Around 4:00 p.m., the town's Carabinieri switchboard received a call from Orazio Fidone, a retired local resident and hobby hunter, who reported having just found the body of a child thrown into a ravine near the Mulino Vecchio, on the outskirts of Santa Croce Camerina.

The Carabinieri went to inspect the area, confirming the presence of a corpse. Panarello was then called to the scene, who confirmed that the body in question is that of the missing boy.

== Investigations ==
Following the discovery of the child's body, after an initial seizure of the car of the hunter who had found the body, the investigations continued in all directions, until, suddenly, they concentrated exclusively on the mother, who, after questioning in the Public Prosecutor's Office, was arrested on charges of murder and concealment of a corpse.

The body was collected by the police to arrange an autopsy, which revealed that the child died between 8:30 and 10 on the same day of his disappearance due to strangulation. The body also showed other signs of violence.

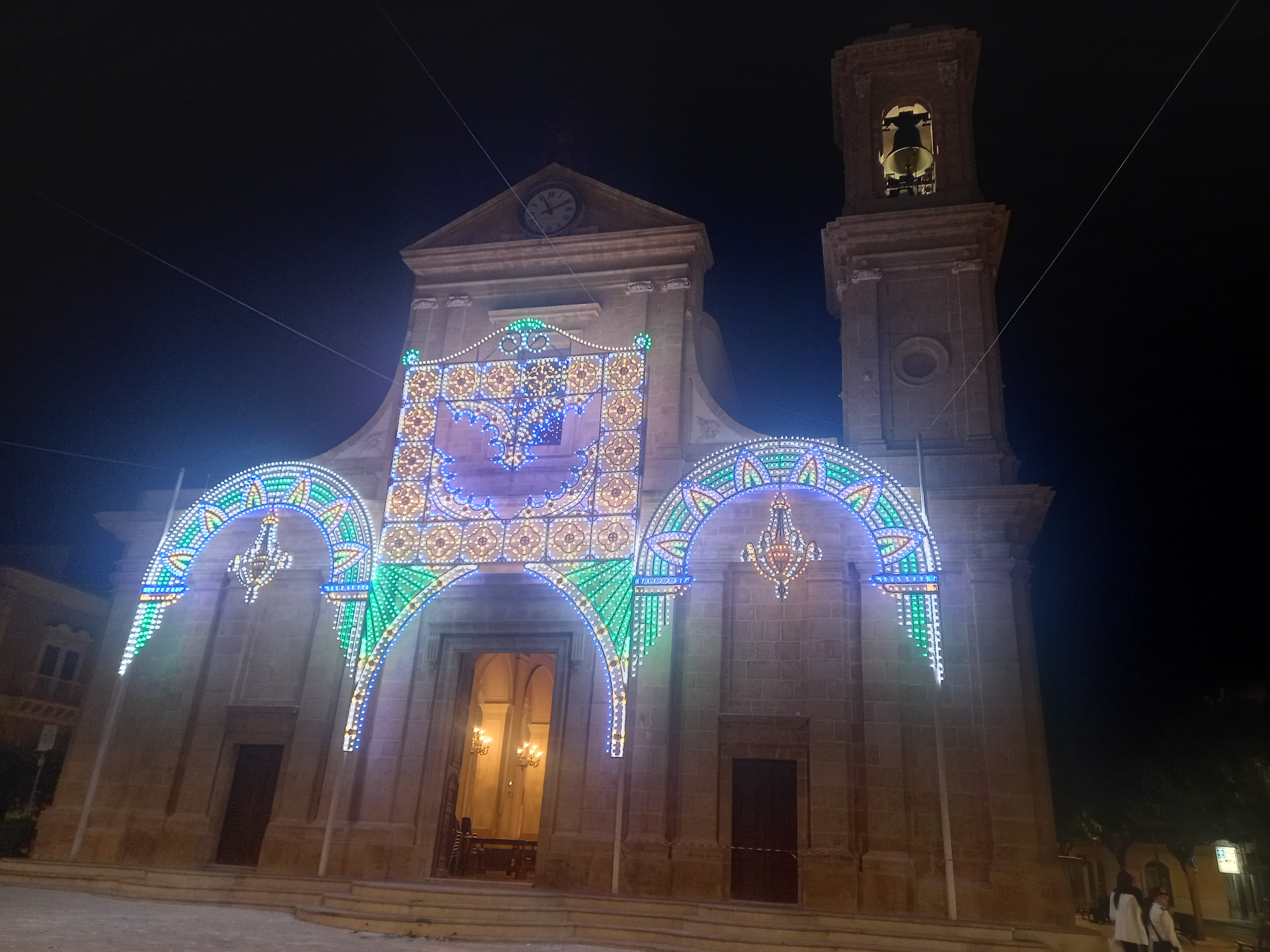
The funeral was held at the Church of San Giovanni Battista

The subsequent investigation made it clear that the strangulation would have been caused by some plastic cable ties. Veronica Panarello claimed to have given Lorys some plastic cable ties that day, which her son allegedly asked her for to carry out a school activity, however the teachers denied having made such a request. On 18 December 2014 the funeral of the little boy was officiated in the main church of the village. Panarello did not take part in it, as she was being held in pre-trial detention.

=== Alternative versions of events ===
For almost a year the mother continued to declare that she had nothing to do with the incident and to reiterate that she had left her son near the school that day. Only after ten months of imprisonment did Panarello begin to make statements, all different and unlikely, in which she declared instead that she had been the protagonist of the tragic events.

The first proposed version told of a child's tantrum, related to the fact of not wanting to go to school, which seemed to have triggered a negative reaction from the mother.

Panarello later provided a new version according to which, while she was busy washing clothes in the bathroom, her son, playing with the cable ties, had tightened them around his neck by himself and without realizing it had strangled himself. The mother had heard Lorys' screams and had tried to help him only when it was too late; fearing the reaction of her husband Davide Stival, she had loaded her dead son into the car, and thrown him into the Mulino Vecchio canal and then hid his backpack.

In 2016, Veronica Panarello provided a further version of what happened, declaring that it was his paternal grandfather Andrea Stival who killed Lorys. The woman reported having had a clandestine relationship with her father-in-law, which Lorys discovered and threatened to tell his father Davide, therefore his grandfather killed him by strangling him with an electric cable and his mother tightened cable ties on him and together they threw him into the ravine. Panarello also said that she had never told this story before for fear of reprisals from her father-in-law on his youngest son, Diego Stival, Lorys' younger brother. Andrea Stival rejected all the accusations, calling them slander and announcing a complaint against Panarello.

== Trial ==
On 17 October 2016, at the end of the trial with an abbreviated procedure conditioned on a psychiatric assessment requested by the defence lawyer Francesco Villardita, Veronica Panarello was sentenced to 30 years of imprisonment for murder. The court also ordered a five-year probation regime and compensation for the recognised civil parties: 350,000 euros to the husband and 100,000 euros to each of the in-laws. On 5 July 2018, the Court of Assizes of Appeal of Catania confirmed the sentence. On 21 November 2019, the Supreme Court of Cassation confirmed the sentence.

On 17 October 2023, the Court of Appeal of Catania confirmed the two-year sentence of Veronica Panarello for slander and defamation against her father-in-law Andrea, issued in the first instance by the Court of Ragusa on 17 September 2021.

== Media attention ==
On 30 October 2018, the documentary Il piccolo Lorys was broadcast on Sky Italia, which reconstructs the entire story, on the basis of the trial documents and interviews given exclusively by the protagonists of the story, including Lorys' father, Davide Stival, the deputy commissioner of Ragusa Antonino Ciavola and the deputy prosecutor Marco Rota.

On 2 November 2023, the documentary Il caso Lorys Stival was broadcast on Rai 2, part of the series Delitti in famiglia and focused on the story.

== Bibliography ==
- Andrzej Zuczkowski, Ramona Bongelli, Ilaria Riccioni (2017). Epistemic Stance in Dialogue: Knowing, Unknowing, Believing. John Benjamins Publishing Company. ISBN 978-9027210463.
- Davide Stival, Simone Toscano, Daniele Scrofani (2018). Nel nome di Lorys. Piemme. ISBN 978-8858519837.

== See also ==
- Cogne case
- Infanticide
- Filicide
- Trial by media
- Santa Croce Camerina
