= Santa Maria delle Scale, Ragusa =

Church building in Ragusa, Italy

Coordinates: 36.9252°N 14.7352°E

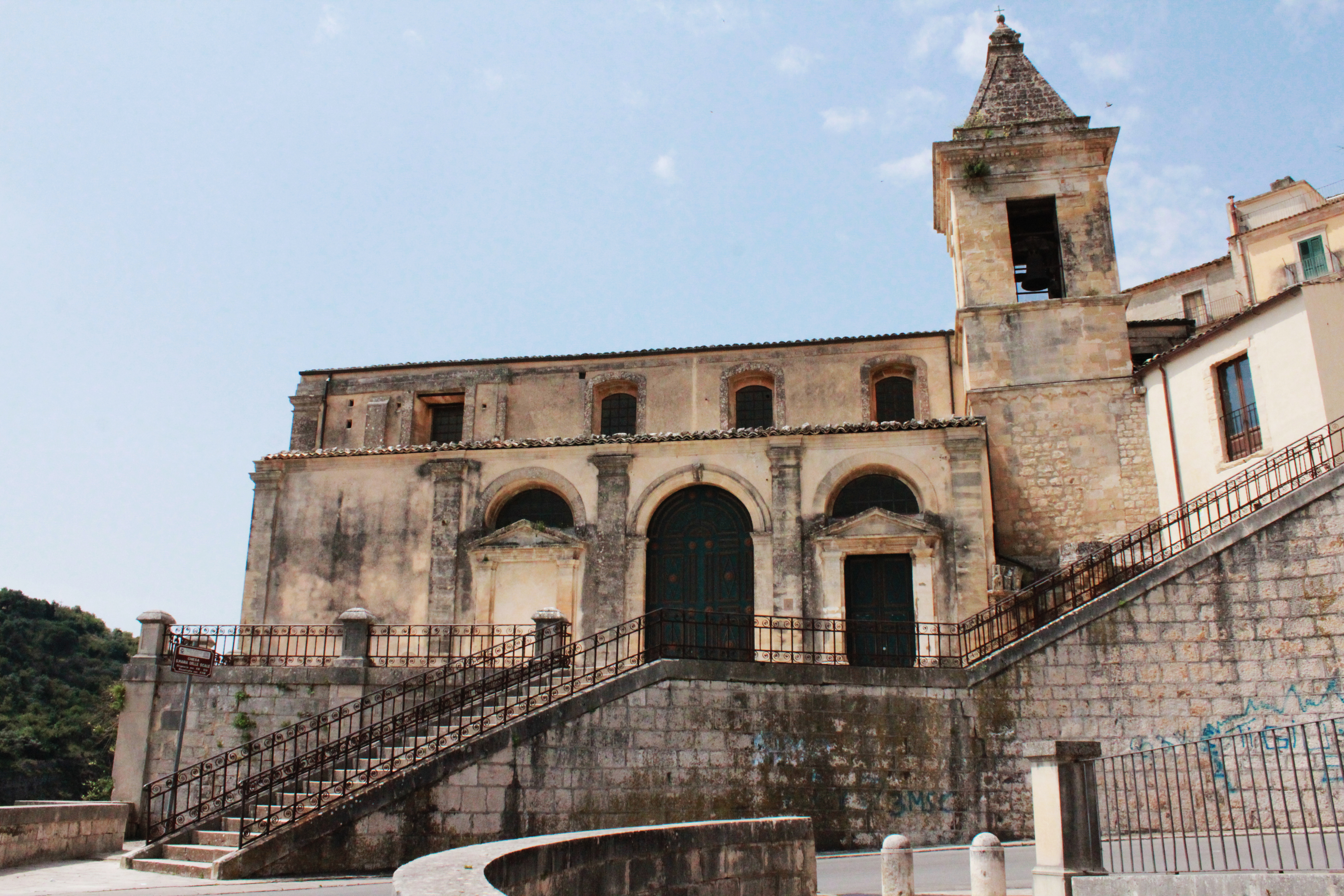
Santa Maria delle Scale, Ragusa.

Santa Maria delle Scale (i.e. "St. Mary of the Stairs") is a church located in Ragusa, Sicily.

It was built by the Cistercian monks of the Abbey of Santa Maria di Roccadia in Lentini, in the first half of the 13th century, in a Gothic style. In the second half of the 18th century, because of the increase of the population, the building was enlarged and largely rebuilt in a Baroque style.
