= Maria Occhipinti =

Italian anarcha-feminist (1921–1996)

- Born: July 29, 1921; Ragusa, Sicily
- Died: August 20, 1996 (aged 75); Rome, Italy
- Movement: anarchism, anarcho-feminism

Maria Occhipinti (1921–1996) was an Italian anarcha-feminist. She became known as "an emblem Sicilian women’s protest" in the mid-forties, as in 1945 she was involved in an anti-draft revolt in Ragusa, Sicily. She became known through her book Una donna di Ragusa (A Woman from Ragusa), published in 1957, although unnoticed until 1976, when a second edition was released. She died in August 1996.

== Biography ==
=== Early life ===
Maria Occhipinti was born to Giorgio and Concetta Sgarioto in Ragusa, Sicily on July 29, 1921. She attended three years of school before dropping out to train as a seamstress. Occhipinti married at age 17, and her husband went into war shortly after their marriage.

=== Politics and activism ===
When her husband went off to war, Occhipinti, described as restless and curious by nature, regained an interest in education and began to teach herself. She began reading, and noted that Victor Hugo’s Les Misérables "opened her eyes to the lot of the disinherited." Controversy arose when she joined her local Camera del Lavoro (in English, the Chamber of Labour) and the Italian Communist Party, but she refused to back down merely because she was a woman. Despite the original scandal, Occhipinti managed to bring other women into labor organizing. Among other things, the Chamber of Labour organized women against high living costs and unpaid debts to families of men that were sent to war.

In 1943, the second World War was largely over for most Italians, and men sent into battle had returned to their homes and families. In December 1944, though, draft cards began to arrive, asking men take part in "the reconstruction of the Italian army," as ordered by the Bonomi government. They had decided to redraft Italian workers to fight against the Germans. Many Italians, having already fought for years, did not want to return to battle. Women, including Maria Occhipinti, played a large role in anti-draft protests. Discussions of the draft, and of dodging it, became commonplace in Ragusa. “We’re not cannon-fodder!” became a common cry of those protesting. Occhipinti frequently participated in these cries and suggested ways of avoiding the draft.

Maria Occhipinti was 23 years old and five months pregnant in the beginning of 1945. She lived with her husband, parents, and sisters in the most populated area of Ragusa. In the morning of January 4, local women called upon her from the street outside: “make yourself heard and have courage. Come and see the big truck ferrying away our children!" A large army truck arrived in Ragusa, and artisans who had been working were being taken into it. Some civilians had approached the drivers and asked them to stop, and Occhipinti joined them, attempting to convince the drivers to release the men and leave. After continued refusal from the drivers and guards, Occhipinti laid herself in front of the truck's wheels, saying “you can kill me, but you shall not pass.” As more and more people crowded the truck, the authorities let the drafted men go. Others have claimed it was Occhipinti's obstruction of the army truck that gave the men time to escape.

The following day, a rebel asked an officer why redrafting was occurring when many of the men had only recently returned from war. In response, the officer threw a grenade at the rebel, killing him. After this death, a riot broke out in protest of the drafts and the murder of the rebel. After three days of rebellion, the military had quelled the rebels and taken over the city. Franco Leggio, an organizer directly involved in the three-day revolt, said Occhipinti diving in front of the truck was the original catalyst.

Once the military had suppressed the rebels, leaders of the rebellion, including revolutionary communist Erasmo Santangelo and Maria Occhipinti, were arrested and incarcerated.

Erasmo Santangelo was found hanged in his cell.

=== Incarceration ===
Though she was a communist, the party abandoned her when she was imprisoned in favor of the state. At first, she was confined in Ustica, where her daughter Maria Lenina, also known as Marilena, was born. Occhipinti and her newborn were transferred to the Benedictine prison in Palermo. Maria Lenina spent the first months of her life in prison, and her mother served almost two years.

=== Life after prison ===
When Occhipinti returned to Ragusa after her incarceration, the local communist party had disowned her. The party saw the 1945 revolts as reactionary. The anarchists of Ragusa, though, offered Occhipinti "solidarity and friendship." The "political and human solace" Occhipinti found in the anarchists followed her for the rest of her life, and she participated in libertarian political activity for many years. Occhipinti began writing for an anarchist press and her politics became staunchly anti-authoritarian. She participated in actions against poverty, as well as physical, psychological, and moral slavery, especially that of women.

Starting in the 1960s, Occhipinti began to travel, visiting Morocco, Paris, London, Canada, and more. She continued to travel for over 25 years, to Naples, Sanremo, Rome, Switzerland, and the United States. In France, she spoke with other political thinkers, notably Jean-Paul Sartre and Simone De Beauvoir. Occhipinti's daughter accompanied her in her travels, and decided to stay in Canada when she was 18.

In 1973, Occhipinti returned to Italy and settled in Rome. She maintained her ties to the anarchist movement and also integrated into feminist movements, adopting pacifist and anti-militarist ideas. She joined the league for unilateral disarmament later in the 1970s. In 1979, she fought against the adoption of agricultural land for industrial use in Ragusa. Even later in life, she participated in anti-militarist actions, speaking publicly in 1987 against US missile bases and war in Comiso and opposing installation of nuclear missiles there. She died in Rome on August 20, 1996, from complications of Parkinson's disease.

== Book ==
In 1957, Maria Occhipinti published Una donna di Ragusa, or A Woman from Ragusa, an autobiographical book surrounding her involvement in the 1945 Ragusa revolts. A second edition was published in 1976 by Feltrinelli, after which it received increased attention, winning the Brancati Award.

Overall, Una donna di Ragusa had three editions published in Italy, one in France, two in Sweden, and additional serialisations in different countries. One publication appeared in a July 1960 edition of Jean-Paul Sartre and Simone de Beauvoir’s Les Temps Modernes.

== Impact and legacy ==
At a 2011 anarchist May Day rally in Ragusa, a two-hour speech mentioned by name Maria Occhipinti and Franco Leggio as crucial representatives of anarchism in the Iblea region.

In 2013, Italian filmmaker Luca Scivoletto released a documentary on Maria Occhipinti, which first premiered on March 25th. The documentary is called Con Quella faccia di straniera - Il viaggio di Maria Occhipinti, which translates to "With Her Foreign Face - Maria Occhipinti's Voyage." The film lasts an hour and covers Occhipinti's early life and political activism, revisiting the places where the 1945 rebellion and her subsequent imprisonment occurred. The documentary was constructed with the help of historians, a previously conducted interview with Maria Occhipinti, and contributions from Occhipinti's family: her sister Rosina, her daughter Marilena, and her granddaughter Lorenza.

== Bibliography ==
- Rebellious Spirit : Maria Occhipinti and the Ragusa Anti-Draft Revolt of 1945 edited by Paul Sharkey and Anna Key. London : Kate Sharpley Library, (2008). ISBN 978-1-873605-59-2
