= Maria Paternò Arezzo =

Maria Paternò
- Principessa di Castellaci
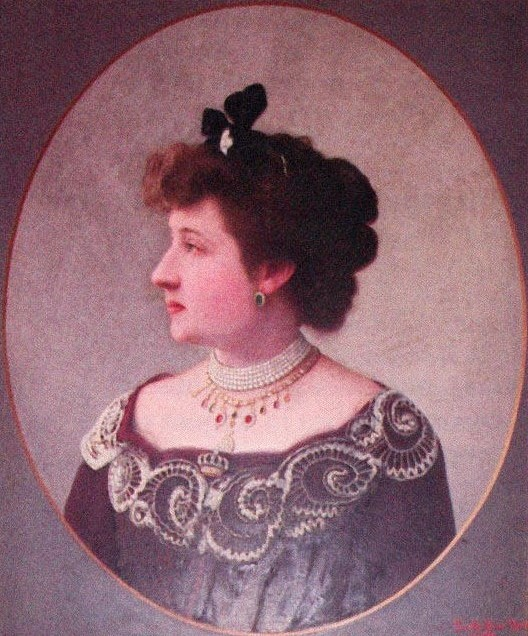
- Maria Paternò Arezzo
- Born: 11 December 1869; Ragusa Ibla, Sicily
- Died: 28 December 1908 (aged 39); Messina
- Noble family: House of Paternò
- Father: Giuseppe Maria Alvaro Paternò
- Mother: Vincenzina Arezzo
- Occupation: noblewoman, philanthropist

Maria Paternò Arezzo (11 December 1869, Ragusa Ibla, Sicily — 28 December 1908, Messina), Princess of Castellaci, was an Italian philanthropist and noblewoman belonging to the House of Paternò, who is renowned for her charity bequest to build a hospital for the poor in her city of birth. She was the daughter of Giuseppe Maria Alvaro Paternò, the 5th Prince of Sperlinga and 13th Baron of Manganelli, and of Vincenzina Arezzo of the barons of Donnafugata. She died when she was only 39 years old, without leaving an heir, under the rubble of the 1908 Messina earthquake together with her husband Francesco Marullo Balsamo, Prince of Castellaci and Count of Condojanni.

== Biography ==
Some years earlier she had willed as her bequest a huge estate intended for the construction of the first hospital in Ragusa, which was to be of service by ensuring at least 30 beds for the care and aid of the city's needy.

The hospital was completed in 1923, and then was united with the Civil Hospital as the Azienda Ospedaliera Civile–Maria Paternò Arezzo: it is an important general hospital pioneering advanced treatments.

On the façade of Palazzo Arezzo in Ragusa Ibla, a marble commemorative stone has been placed in her memory, and a street in Ragusa Ibla is dedicated to her. The municipality, in concert with the Red Cross, has organized celebrations in her memory.

== Bibliography ==
- AA.VV., Il Castello di Donnafugata a Ragusa, Ragusa, Angelica Editore, 2002.
