= Santa Croce Camerina =

Santa Croce Camerina Santa Cruci Camarina (Sicilian)
- Comune
- Comune di Santa Croce Camerina
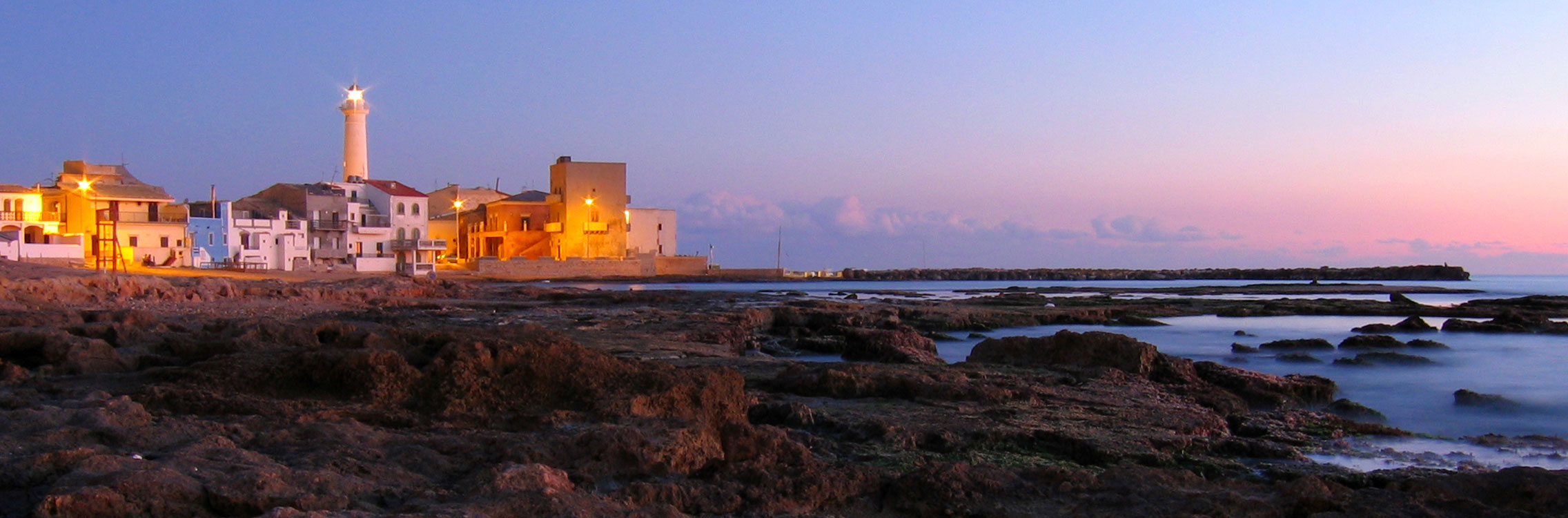
- The lighthouse in the frazione of Punta Secca

- Coat of arms

- Santa Croce Camerina within the Province of Ragusa

- Location within Italy Location within Sicily
- Coordinates: 36°50′N 14°31′E
- Country: Italy
- Region: Sicily
- Province: Ragusa (RG)
- Frazioni: Casuzze, Kaukana, Punta Secca, Punta Braccetto

Government
  - Mayor: Giuseppe Dimartino

Area
  - Total: 41.09 km^{2} (15.86 sq mi)
- Elevation: 87 m (285 ft)

Population (30 November 2017)
  - Total: 10,973
  - Density: 267.0/km^{2} (691.7/sq mi)
- Demonym: Camerinesi
- Time zone: UTC+1 (CET)
  - Summer (DST): UTC+2 (CEST)
- Postal code: 97017
- Dialing code: 0932
- Patron saint: Saint Joseph
- Saint day: March 19
- Website: Official website

Santa Croce Camerina (Sicilian: Santa Cruci Camarina) is a town and comune in the province of Ragusa, Sicily, in southern Italy. As of 2017 its population was of 10,973.

== History ==
In 2014, the town was scene to the Santa Croce Camerina crime.

== Geography ==
The municipal territory of Santa Croce is surrounded by the one of Ragusa, except for the coastline. The hamlets (frazioni) are the villages of Casuzze, Kaukana, Punta Secca and Punta Braccetto, the latter being shared with Ragusa.

== See also ==
- Marina di Ragusa
- Scoglitti
- Donnalucata
- Donnafugata Castle
