= Villa Zinna =

Villa Zinna is a 17th-century country estate located in the Zinnafondo / Zannafondo county in the Province of Ragusa, Sicily. Formerly a property of the order of the Knights of Malta, it was then absorbed into the Catholic Order of the Jesuits. With the institution of the early Italian State in 1861, the Italian government negotiated with the Vatican State the concession, division and eventual sale of large church properties to private Sicilian citizens.

Today the property serves as the center of operations for the IBLA Grand Prize International Competitions and Festival. Annually hundreds of musicians from all over the world join in public performances in Ragusa Ibla during the month of July for the IBLA GRAND PRIZE. The IBLA Grand Prize was founded in 1992 on the occasion of the 500th year celebrations of the discovery of America and it celebrated its 27th anniversary in 2018.
