= Concealment of a corpse =

Crime in Italian law

Concealment of a corpse (Italian: L'occultamento di cadavere) is a crime provided for by the Italian legal system. It is punished by Article 412 of the Italian Penal Code and is included among the crimes against piety for the deceased, which protect the common feeling of piety inspired by human remains and the generalized feeling of respect that they inspire.

It is different to the crime of suppression or "soppressione di cadavere".

The penalty for this crime is imprisonment of up to 3 years. It may result not only in a conviction for the specific crime of concealment, but also in an increased penalty for the principal crime.

== See also ==
- Preventing the lawful burial of a body, British legal term
- Lupara bianca
