= Marina di Ragusa =

- Frazione
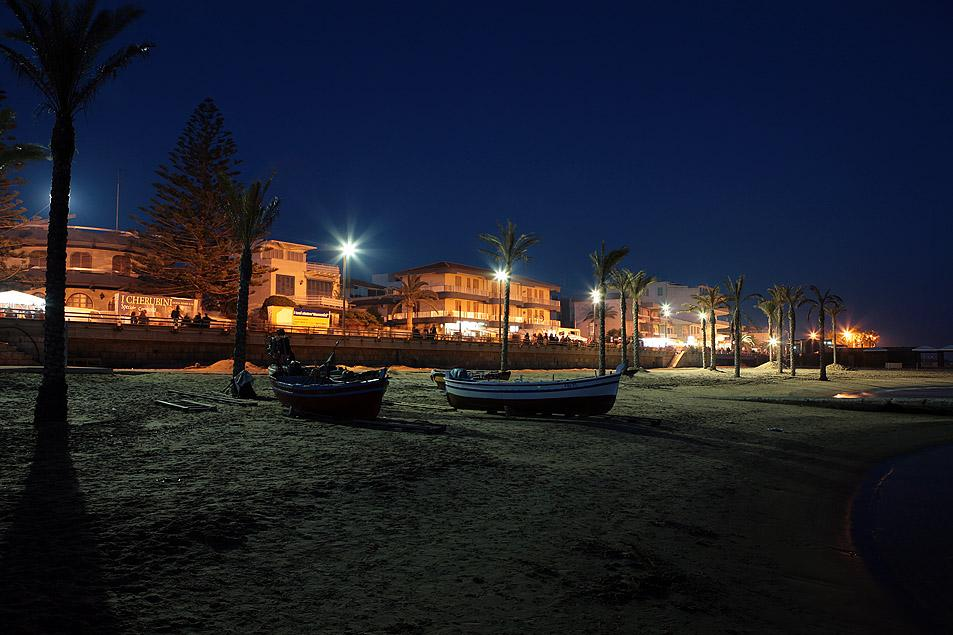
- The seafront by night

- Location of Marina di Ragusa in Italy
- Coordinates: 36°47′5″N 14°33′1″E
- Country: Italy
- Region: Sicily
- Province: Ragusa (RG)
- Comune: Ragusa
- Elevation: 8 m (26 ft)

Population (2025)
  - Total: 7,000
- Demonym: Mazzariddàri
- Time zone: UTC+1 (CET)
  - Summer (DST): UTC+2 (CEST)
- Postal code: 97010
- Dialing code: (+39) 0932
- Patron saint: Santa Maria di Porto Salvo

Marina di Ragusa, also known as Mazzarelli, is a southern Italian village and hamlet (frazione) of Ragusa, a municipality seat of the homonym province, Sicily. In 2025 it had a population of 7,000 which during the summer rises to more than 60,000.

== History ==
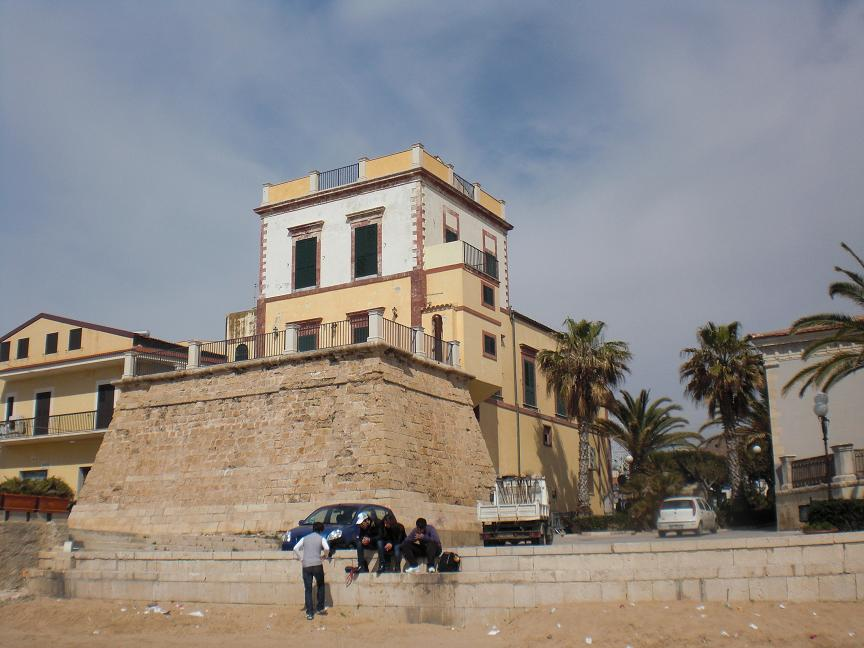
The Torre Cabrera

The remains of a Greek settlement of the 5th century BC, when this area was under the control of Kamarina, have been found on the banks of the nearby river Irminio that was used as canal-port. The village was known since the Byzantine era (5th century) when a loading pier was built to export the local products. The Arab geographer El Idrisi writes that during the Arab domination (827-1091) it was called Marsa A'Rillah (small port) and during the years 1584 and 1596 a watchtower known as Torre Cabrera was built by order of the Count B. Cabrera next to the port of the village due to Saracen-ships sailing this stretch of sea. It remained a sleepy fishing village until the 1870s when its port was extensively used for the export of the local asphalt, mined in Ragusa, to numerous European capitals. It was called Mazzarelli until 1928 when the local council changed the name in Marina di Ragusa. During the 1960s, it became a tourist resort, a role which it still maintains today.

== Geography ==
Marina di Ragusa is located by the Mediterranean coast of the island of Sicily, directly opposite the island of Malta. It is 6 km from Santa Croce Camerina, 11 from Donnalucata, 17 from Scicli, 24 from Ragusa and 27 from Modica.

== Economy ==
The local economy is based on tourism due to the quality of its beaches. Many bars, restaurants and hotels are busy during the summer season whilst during the winter the village gets busy only at weekends. Nightclubs and camping can also be found. The local fishing industry has nearly disappeared and has been replaced by intensive agriculture in greenhouses that can be found along this stretch of coast. From the nearby Market of Vittoria green-products get exported to all Europe.

== Transport ==
=== Public transport ===
The only public transport in Marina di Ragusa are two bus-lines (A and B), that run from west (port) to east (end of the promenade Andrea Doria). There are also several daily buses to Ragusa and Catania and the nearest airport is Comiso Airport at 29 km (18 mi). The Provincial Road SP25 Ragusa Mare connects Ragusa to its beach resort.

=== The Port ===
The new port of Marina di Ragusa was designed in the 1980s but after a short time works stopped until the years 2006–2008, when with European Funding it was possible to complete it. The new port aims to become one of the major tourist ports of the island. The new structure is the biggest tourist port of Sicily and can moor over 800 boats and the new offices for the Coast Guard. It was officially opened 3 July 2009. In 2010 shops, a supermarket and a bar were opened.

In 2025, a new ferry service to Valletta, Malta began operation.

== Gallery ==
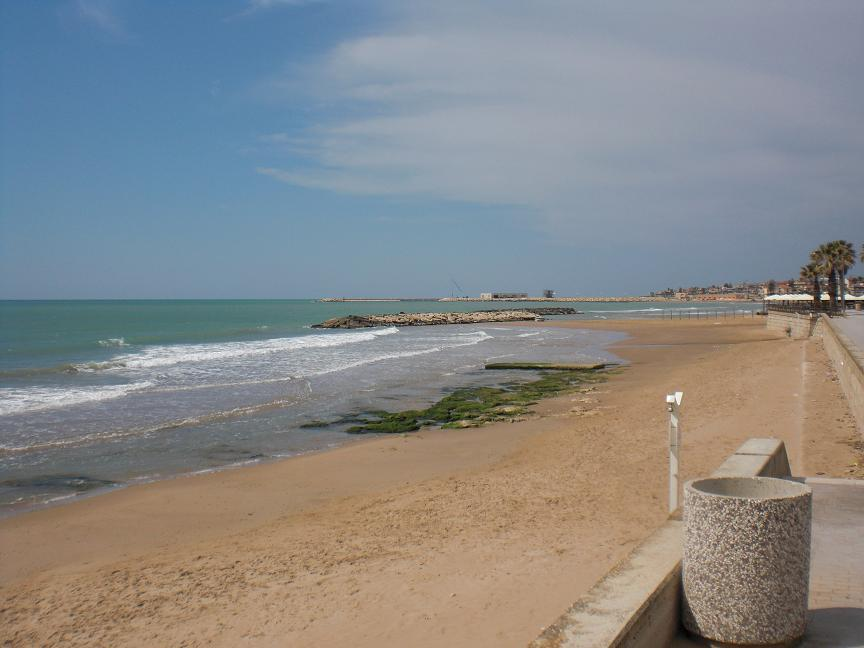
Seafront at Marina with the port in the distance

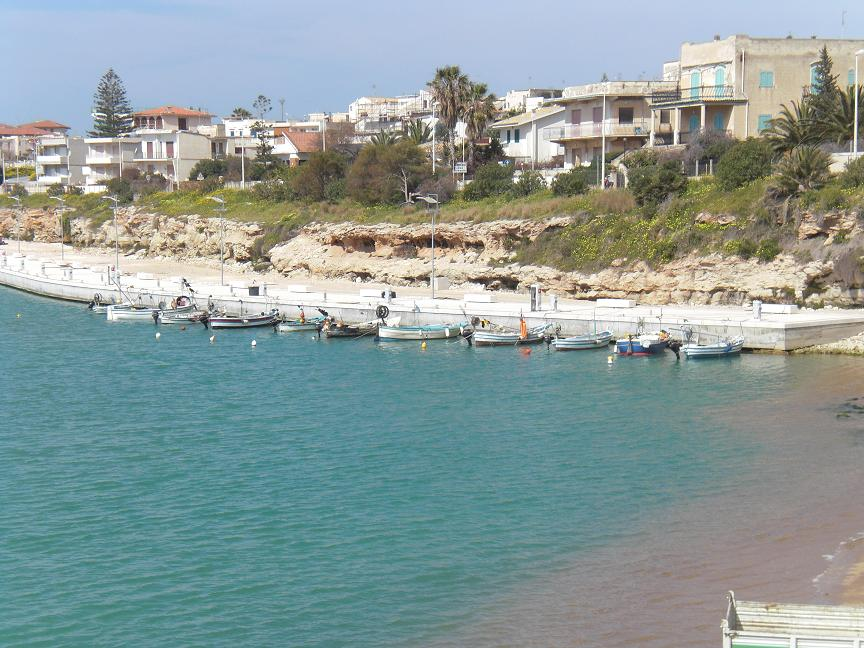
Boats in the port of Marina (March 2009)

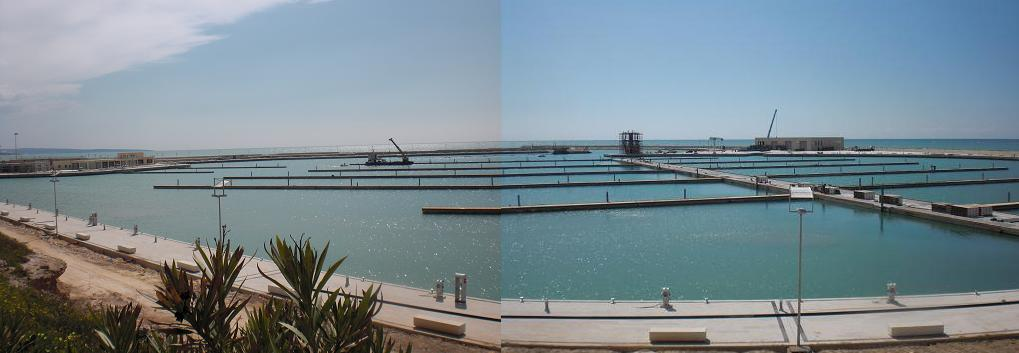
The Port of Marina di Ragusa
