= Chiesa del Purgatorio, Ragusa =

Church in Italy

Coordinates: 36.9264°N 14.7371°E

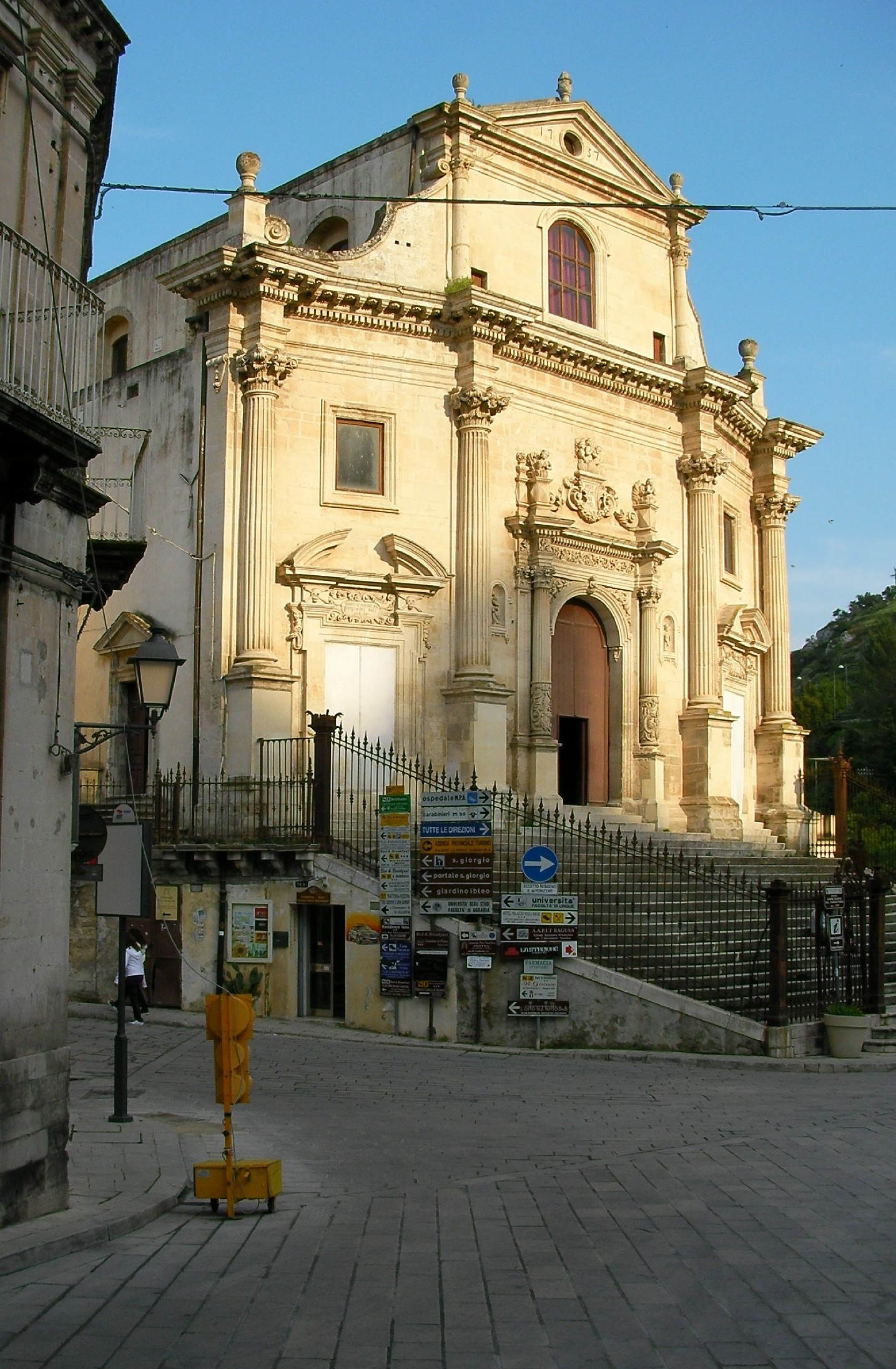
Facade of church.

The Chiesa del Purgatorio ("Church of the Purgatory"), also called the Chiesa delle Santissime Anime del Purgatorio) is a Roman Catholic church located on Piazza della Repubblica in the city of Ragusa, in southern Sicily, Italy. The church is dedicated to those praying for the souls in purgatory.

== History ==
A church was first consecrated in 1658, erected under the patronage of the Mazza family. The 1693 Sicily earthquake that nearly levelled Ragusa left this church mainly untouched, and in 1694, it took over some of the functions of the nearby church of San Giovanni, which had moved into a new district of Patro. In 1729, this church was placed under the jurisdiction of the church of San Giorgio.

A bell-tower was added in the early 18th-century. But too small for the district, in 1740, a new church was begun with a central nave and two chapels, separated by columns with Corinthian capitals (1741). The three order facade was completed in 1757, but the presbytery was completed in 1787, when it underwent reconsecration.

The church is preceded by a steep staircase to a small piazza degli Archi. The chapels of the Most Blessed Sacrament and of the Most Holy Crucifix have altars depicting respectively St John the Evangelist and the Addolorata. The main altarpiece depicts Saints and Souls in Purgatory by Francesco Manno. The cornice has depictions of earthly glory interspersed with skulls as a Memento mori.
