= Ragusa, Sicily =

City in Sicily, Italy

Ragusa Rausa (Sicilian)
- Comune
- Città di Ragusa
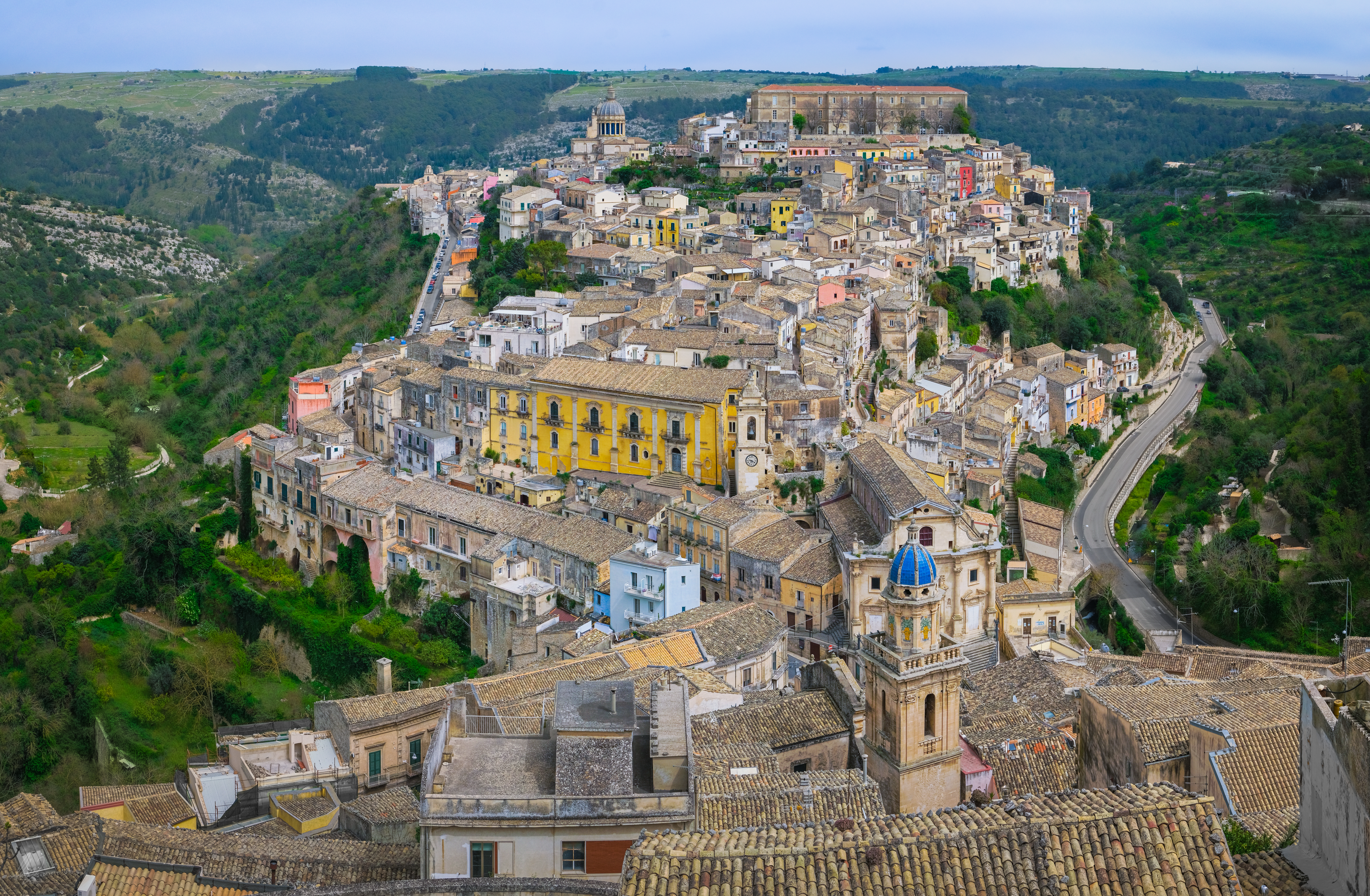
- Panorama of Ragusa Ibla

- Flag Coat of arms

- Ragusa within the Province of Ragusa

- Location within Italy Location within Sicily
- Coordinates: 36°56′N 14°45′E
- Country: Italy
- Region: Sicily
- Province: Ragusa (RG)
- Frazioni: Marina di Ragusa, San Giacomo Bellocozzo

Government
  - Mayor: Giuseppe Cassì

Area
  - Total: 444.67 km^{2} (171.69 sq mi)
- Elevation: 520 m (1,710 ft)

Population (2025)
  - Total: 73,778
  - Density: 165.92/km^{2} (429.72/sq mi)
- Demonym: Ragusano
- Time zone: UTC+1 (CET)
  - Summer (DST): UTC+2 (CEST)
- Postal code: 97100
- Dialing code: 0932
- Patron saint: St. John the Baptist (Ragusa); St. George (Ragusa Ibla)
- Saint day: June 24
- Website: Official website

UNESCO World Heritage Site
- Part of: Late Baroque Towns of the Val di Noto (South-Eastern Sicily)
- Criteria: Cultural: (i)(ii)(iv)(v)
- Reference: 1024rev-007
- Inscription: 2002 (26th Session)
- Area: 17.39 ha (1,872,000 sq ft)
- Buffer zone: 29.32 ha (3,156,000 sq ft)

Ragusa (Italian: [raˈɡuːza]; Sicilian: Rausa [raˈuːsa]; Latin: Ragusia) is a city and comune, capital of the province of Ragusa in the autonomous island region of Sicily in southern Italy. As of 2025, with a population of 73,778, Ragusa is the 6th-largest city in Sicily and the 74th-largest in Italy.

It is built on a wide limestone hill between two deep valleys, Cava San Leonardo and Cava Santa Domenica. Together with seven other cities in the Val di Noto, it is part of a UNESCO World Heritage Site.

== History ==
The origins of Ragusa can be traced back to the 2nd millennium BC, when there were several Sicel settlements in the area. The current district of Ragusa Ibla has been identified as Hybla Heraea.

The ancient city, located on a 300 metres (980 ft)-high hill, came into contact with nearby Greek colonies and grew thanks to the nearby port of Camerina. After a short period of Carthaginian rule, it fell into the hands of the ancient Romans and the Byzantines, who fortified the city and built a large castle. Ragusa was occupied by the Arabs in 848 AD and remained under their rule until the 11th century, when the Normans conquered it. Ragusa was selected as a county seat, and its first count was Geoffrey, son of Count Ruggero of Sicily.

Thereafter, Ragusa's history followed the events of the Kingdom of Sicily, created in the first half of the twelfth century. A Chiaramonte family fief, it remained the county capital after it has been unified with Modica in 1296, a status that it lost in the 15th century after a popular revolt.

In 1693, Ragusa was devastated by a huge earthquake, which killed some 5,000 inhabitants. After the catastrophe, the city was largely rebuilt, and many Baroque buildings from that time remain in the city. Most of the population moved to a new settlement in the former district of Patro. The new district was called "Ragusa Superiore" (Upper Ragusa) and the ancient city "Ragusa Inferiore" (Lower Ragusa) or Ragusa Ibla.

In 1838, an asphalt deposit was discovered, which is still being worked.

In 1848, together with the cities of Modica and Scicli, it rebelled against the Bourbon government to obtain the island's freedom and independence. In 1860, armed volunteers were immediately sent to help Garibaldi, who had just landed in Marsala. It became part of the Kingdom of Italy under the guidance of Senator Corrado Arezzo de Spuches di Donnafugata.

In 1866, after several decades of disputes between "Ragusa inferiore", or Ragusa Ibla, and "Ragusa superiore", the two towns became separate municipalities. Both cities remained separated until 1926, when they were merged to become a provincial capital in 1927 at the expense of Modica, which had been the former capital and the most populous and important city in the region since 1296.

In 1889, the Banca Popolare Cooperativa di Ragusa was founded, the first embryo of the current Banca Agricola Popolare di Ragusa. The bank thrived thanks to the huge wealth and prosperous agriculture that belonged to the now ex-county, and it immediately became an important point of reference for the whole Ibla economy.

In the early 20th century, socialist ideas spread particularly strongly in the Ragusa area compared to rest of the region, according to many fascist historians. Ragusa was described as a "fief of the reds", like that of Bologna. A strong political dialectic caused fascism to impose itself on Ragusa, which provoked a violent response similar to that in the Po Valley. On 29 January 1921, a group of fascists destroyed the socialist circle of Vittoria, killed a man and injured four others. Two months later in Ragusa, four people were killed and sixty were injured. The main promoter of fascist ideology in Ragusa was Totò Giurato, the grandfather of the television presenter Luca Giurato.

During the Second World War, Ragusa was one of many Sicilian towns in which the fascist regime of Benito Mussolini was deeply unpopular. The reasons were straightforward anti-Sicilian racism on the part of the fascist regime, which was central to the regime's ideology, and the anti-mafia campaign led by the fascist agent Cesare Mori, which was so heavy-handed, brutal and draconian that it managed to alienate huge swaths of the Sicilian population. Also, the fascist administration in Sicily was largely incompetent and indifferent to the local population. When food became scarce and the regime had to start rationing food, Sicily was designated as being the last to receive food aid. That often included food that was grown in Sicily (particularly wheat and fruit), which was then exported to Northern Italy although scarcity had become a major problem in Sicily. Police officers from Sicily were replaced with those from Northern Italy since the former were perceived by the regime to be more loyal to their local communities than to Mussolini. Those from Northern Italy were underpaid, which led to them quickly becoming corrupt and indifferent. Also, they often held attitudes that were contemptuous towards the Sicilian population.

When the combined British and American military operation to invade Sicily began (Operation Husky), the population of Ragusa deeply resented Mussolini and his regime. British forces landed to south and east of Ragusa along the coast, and American forces landed southwest of Ragusa in the Gulf of Gela. Both groups linked up in several towns in both locations, including Ragusa. The small detachment of fascist troops in Ragusa fled without fighting while the British and American forces approached. The local population welcomed the British and American soldiers with "unbridled enthusiasm".

On 6 May 1950, with a regular papal bull, Ragusa was raised to the dignity of diocese because of the wise and constant commitment of Msgr. Carmelo Canzonieri, the parish priest of Saint John the Baptist who later became auxiliary bishop of Messina before and then of Caltagirone. That took the territory from the archdiocese of Syracuse and the diocese of Noto.

Ragusa is also the most important financial pole of the south because of the BAPR, which is the fourth Italian popular bank.

Since the 1990s, the economy of Ragusa has been developing towards the industrial sector, which is still growing rapidly, in contrast to the situation in Italy. The scarce presence of infrastructure has limited the great potential of this territory, but it remains the most important export area of Sicily.

== Geography ==
Ragusa is a hilltown that lies below the Hyblaean Mountains, and is historically divided into Ragusa Ibla and Ragusa Superiore. The municipality borders with Chiaramonte Gulfi, Comiso, Giarratana, Modica, Monterosso Almo, Rosolini (SR), Santa Croce Camerina, Scicli and Vittoria. It counts the hamlets (frazioni) of Marina di Ragusa, located by the sea, and San Giacomo Bellocozzo.

=== Climate ===
Climate data for Ragusa (1991–2019)
Month	Jan	Feb	Mar	Apr	May	Jun	Jul	Aug	Sep	Oct	Nov	Dec	Year
Mean daily maximum °C (°F)	13.0 (55.4)	13.4 (56.1)	16.0 (60.8)	19.3 (66.7)	24.4 (75.9)	29.7 (85.5)	32.3 (90.1)	32.6 (90.7)	27.6 (81.7)	23.6 (74.5)	18.0 (64.4)	13.8 (56.8)	22.0 (71.6)
Daily mean °C (°F)	9.2 (48.6)	9.2 (48.6)	11.3 (52.3)	14.1 (57.4)	18.7 (65.7)	23.6 (74.5)	26.3 (79.3)	26.6 (79.9)	22.3 (72.1)	18.8 (65.8)	14.1 (57.4)	10.4 (50.7)	17.1 (62.7)
Mean daily minimum °C (°F)	5.4 (41.7)	4.9 (40.8)	6.6 (43.9)	8.9 (48.0)	12.9 (55.2)	17.6 (63.7)	20.2 (68.4)	20.7 (69.3)	17.1 (62.8)	14.1 (57.4)	10.1 (50.2)	6.9 (44.4)	12.1 (53.8)
Average precipitation mm (inches)	95 (3.7)	71 (2.8)	53 (2.1)	42 (1.7)	21 (0.8)	8 (0.3)	8 (0.3)	19 (0.7)	41 (1.6)	75 (3.0)	82 (3.2)	102 (4.0)	617 (24.2)
Average precipitation days (≥ 1.0 mm)	11	10	9	9	4	2	2	3	6	9	11	11	87
Source 1: Climi e viaggi
Source 2: Istituto Superiore per la Protezione e la Ricerca Ambientale (precipitation 1971–2000)

== Demographics ==
As of 2025, Ragusa has a population of 73,778, of whom 49.0% are male and 51.0% are female, exactly equal to the nationwide average. Minors make up 15.4% of the population, and seniors make up 24.1%, compared to the Italian average of 14.9% and 24.7% respectively.

As of 2024, the foreign-born population is 8,494, equal to 11.5% of the population. The 5 largest foreign nationalities are Albanians (1,914), Tunisians (1,186), Romanians (871), Argentinians (622) and Germans (402).

Foreign population by country of birth (2024)
Country of birth	Population
Albania	1,914
Tunisia	1,186
Romania	871
Argentina	622
Germany	402
Nigeria	261
Brazil	259
Venezuela	257
Morocco	225
Bangladesh	187
Poland	158
Libya	134
Switzerland	121
The Gambia	112
Ukraine	110

Historical population

Year	Pop.	±%
1861	22,883	—
1871	29,087	+27.1%
1881	31,185	+7.2%
1901	41,594	+33.4%
1911	55,189	+32.7%
1921	55,842	+1.2%
1931	50,797	−9.0%
1936	50,158	−1.3%

Year	Pop.	±%
1951	50,240	+0.2%
1961	57,311	+14.1%
1971	61,805	+7.8%
1981	64,492	+4.3%
1991	67,535	+4.7%
2001	68,956	+2.1%
2011	69,794	+1.2%
2021	72,779	+4.3%

Source: ISTAT

== Sights ==
The city has two distinct areas, the lower and older town of Ragusa Ibla, and the higher Ragusa Superiore (Upper Town). The two halves are separated by the Valle dei Ponti, a deep ravine crossed by four bridges, the most noteworthy of which is the eighteenth-century Ponte dei Cappuccini.

=== Upper Town ===
Ragusa Cathedral, dedicated to Saint John the Baptist (San Giovanni Battista), is the biggest attraction in Ragusa Superiore. The church was originally located in the western part of ancient Ragusa, under the walls of the Mediaeval castle, where the small church of St. Agnese is today. A smaller building was quickly built on the site after the 1693 earthquake, which soon proved inadequate. The current edifice was built between 1718 and 1778, with a façade in typical southern Sicilian Baroque style, with three portals and sculptures representing the Madonna, St. John the Baptist and St. John the Evangelist. The upper columns have two clocks showing the time in Italian and French fashions respectively. The high bell tower, on the left side, is also in Baroque style.

The ornate Baroque interior has a Latin cross plan, with a nave and two aisles separated by three colonnades embellished with gold. Charts showing Bible verses referring to St. John the Baptist are over every column. The dome was built in 1783, and covered with copper sheets during the 20th century. The side chapels, characterized by altars decorated with polychrome marbles, date from the 19th century.

Also noteworthy is the Hyblean Archaeological Museum, with different sections devoted to archaeological finds from the Prehistoric to the Late Roman era.

=== Ragusa Ibla ===
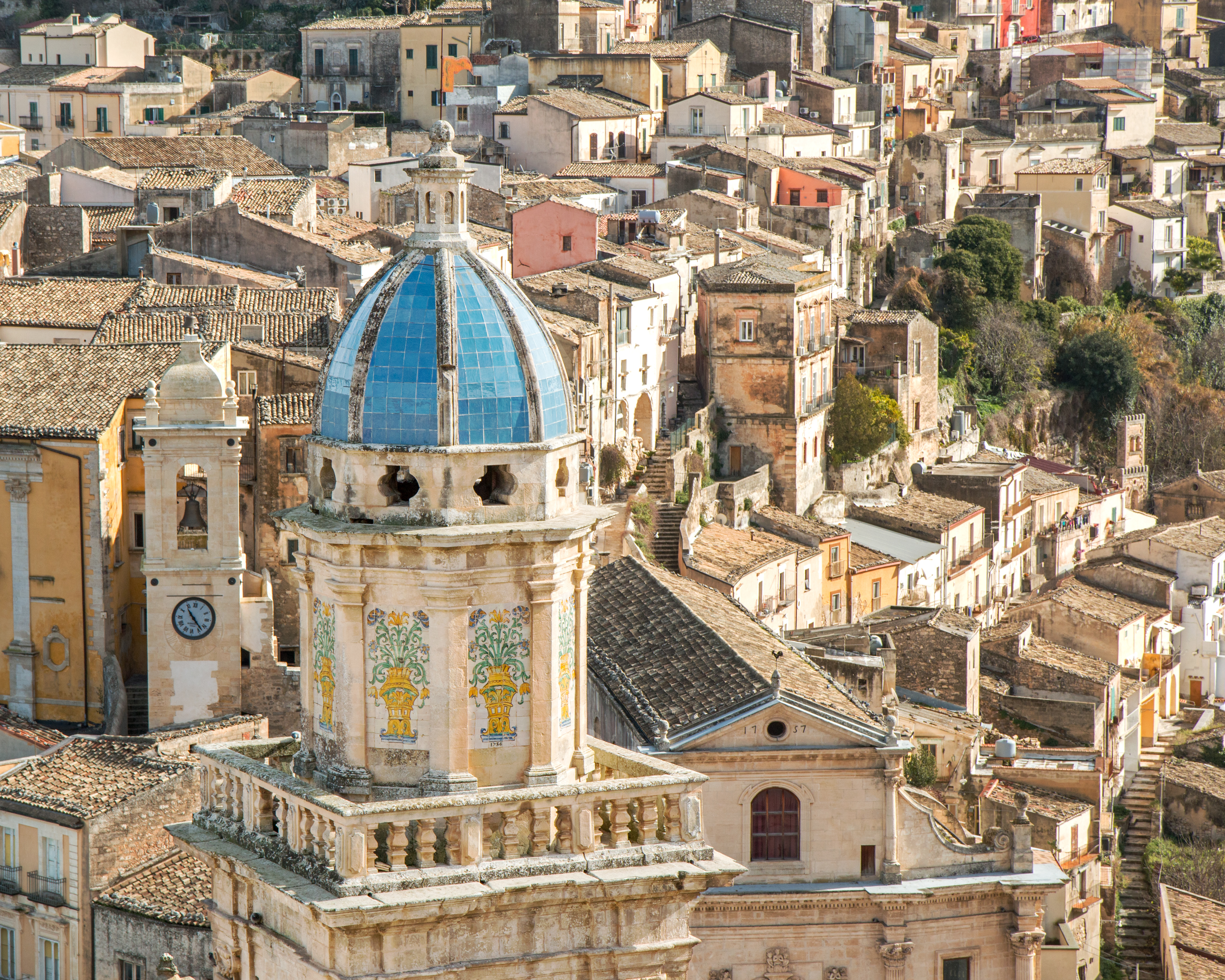
Blue dome of bell-tower of Santa Maria dell'Itria church in Ragusa Ibla

Ragusa Ibla is home to a wide array of Baroque architecture, including several stunning palaces and churches:

- Collegiate Church (Duomo) of San Giorgio: construction started in 1738 by architect Rosario Gagliardi, to replace temple destroyed by the 1693 earthquake. The church retains its older Catalan-Gothic style portal. The façade contains a flight of 250 steps and massive ornate columns, as well as statues of saints and decorated portals. The interior has a Latin Cross plan, with a nave and two aisles ending in half-circular apses. It is topped by a large Neoclassical dome built in 1820.
- Santa Maria delle Scale ("Saint Mary of the Steps"): church lies a narrow winding street connecting Ragusa Ibla with Ragusa Superiore. Built between the 15th and the 16th centuries. While badly damaged in the 1693 earthquake, half of this church was rebuilt in Baroque style, while half retained the original Gothic style (including the three Catalan-style portals in the right aisle). The last chapel of the latter has a Renaissance portal. The chapels altarpieces are by 18th-century Sicilian painters of the 18th century.
- Chiesa del Purgatorio: Dedicated to prayer for souls in purgatory, church has a baroque portal.
- Santa Maria dell'Itria: built by the Knights of Malta in the 17th century, has a campanile with ceramics from Caltagirone and a canvas attributed to Mattia Preti.
- San Filippo Neri
- San Giorgio: designed by Rosario Gagliardi, church was built between 1739–1775, has a façade with tiers of juxtaposed columns. The Treasury contains silver items. Similar though smaller is the nearby church of San Giuseppe, with an elliptic interior housing a 17th-century statue.
- Sant'Antonino: church exemplifies Norman architecture, characterized by a Gothic portal, while the Church of Immacolata boasts a fine fourteenth-century portal.
- San Giorgio Vecchio: church boasts a façade with a notable Gothic-Catalan portal, with a high lunette portraying St George Killing the Dragon, and Aragonese eagles.
- Hyblean Garden: offers a good view to the three churches of the Cappuccini Vecchi, St. James (fourteenth century) and San Domenico.
- Zacco Palace: Baroque building, has Corinthian columns support balconies of wrought iron work, caryatids and grotesques.
- Villa Zinna: country estate.

== Transport ==
Ragusa has two railway stations, Ragusa and Ragusa Ibla, on the Canicattì-Gela-Syracuse line. Two other stations serve the localities of Donnafugata and Genisi.

The town will be served by the planned extension, from Rosolini to Gela, of the A18 motorway. The new exit for Ragusa will be located between the town and Marina di Ragusa.

== Gallery ==
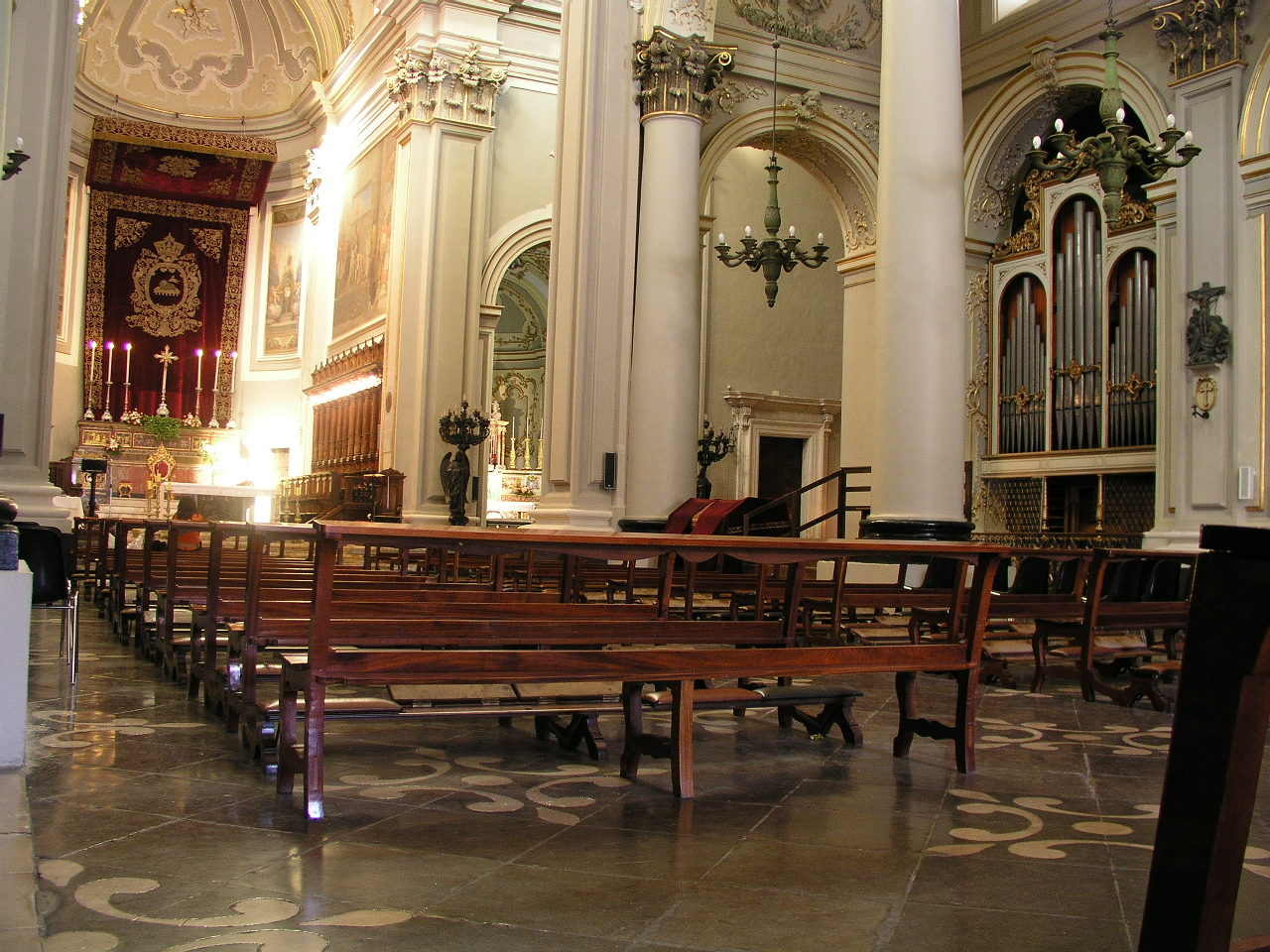
The 18th-century interior of the Cathedral of St. John the Baptist.

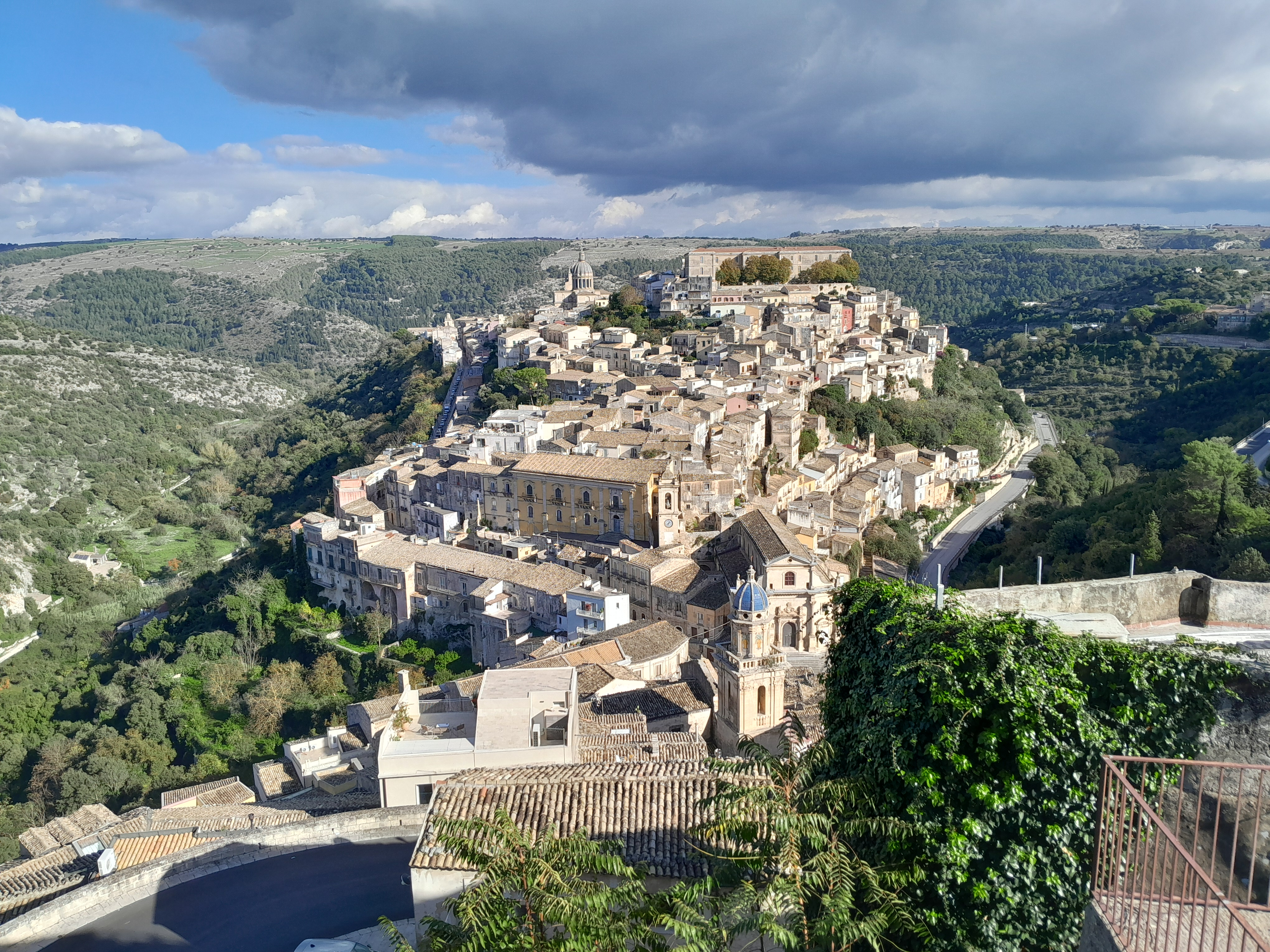
Ragusa Ibla

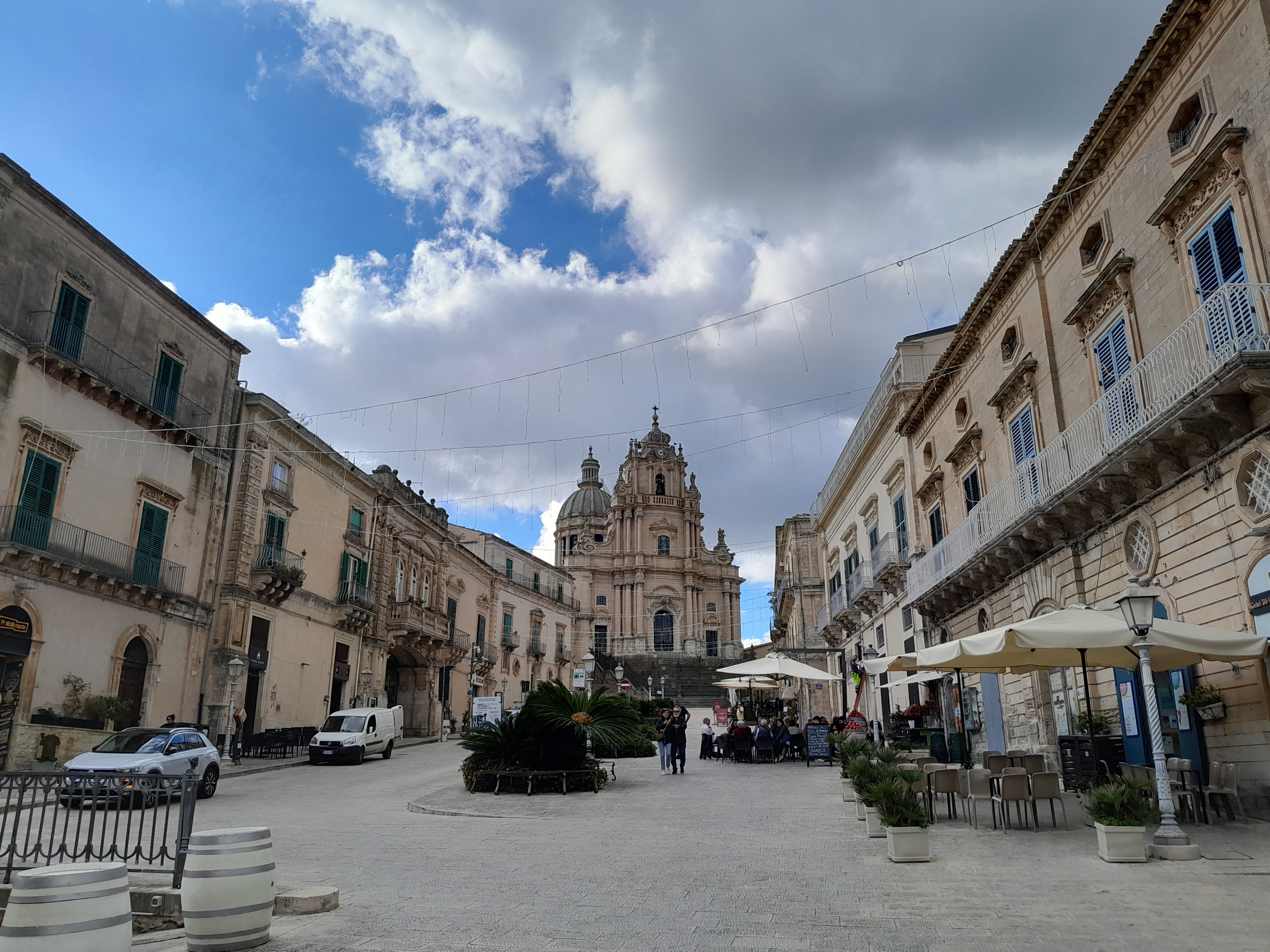
Cathedral of San Giorgio in Ragusa Ibla

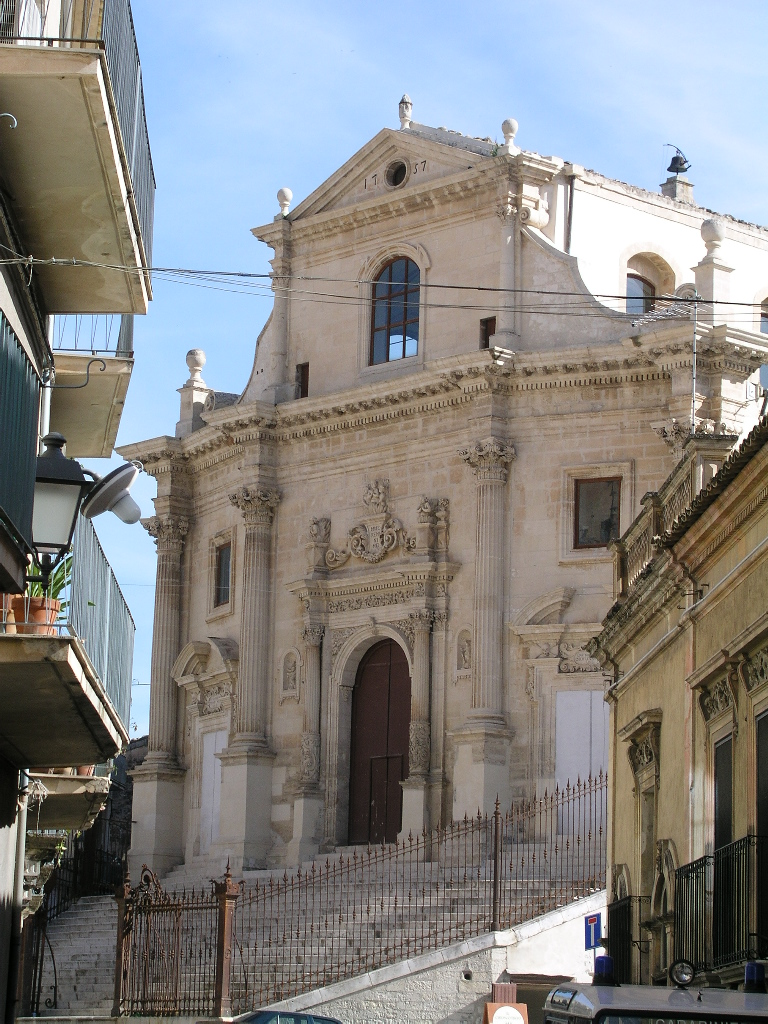
The Church of the Souls of Purgatory, one of the Baroque edifices built after the 1693 earthquake

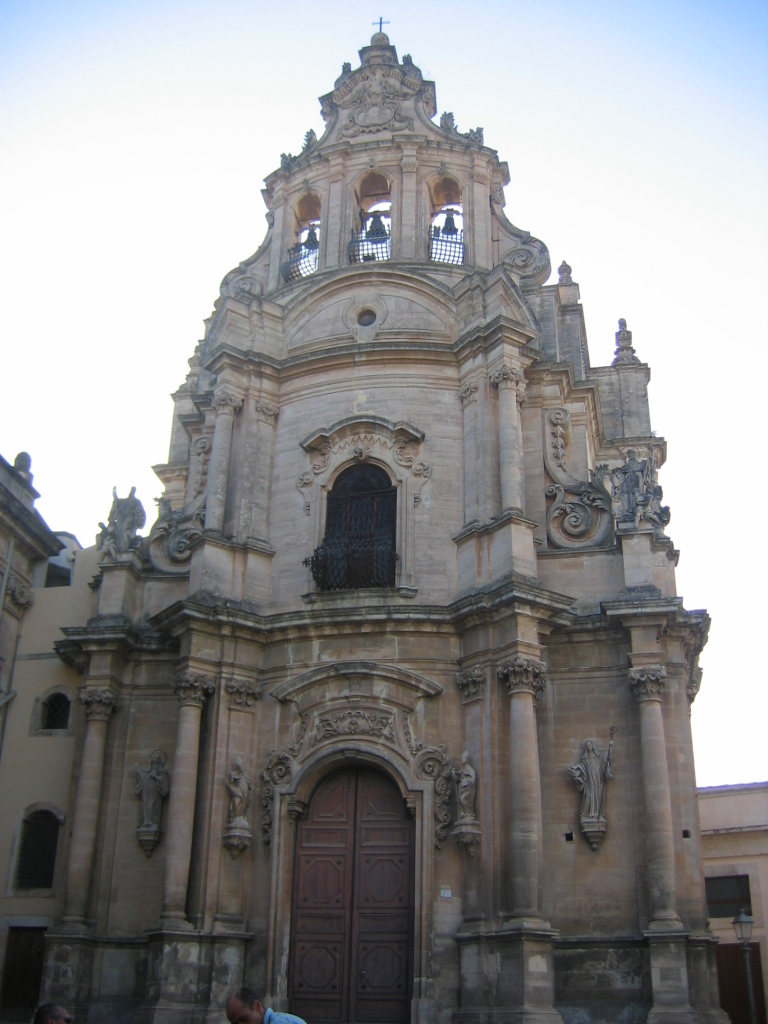
Decorative Baroque façade of San Giuseppe church in Ragusa Ibla

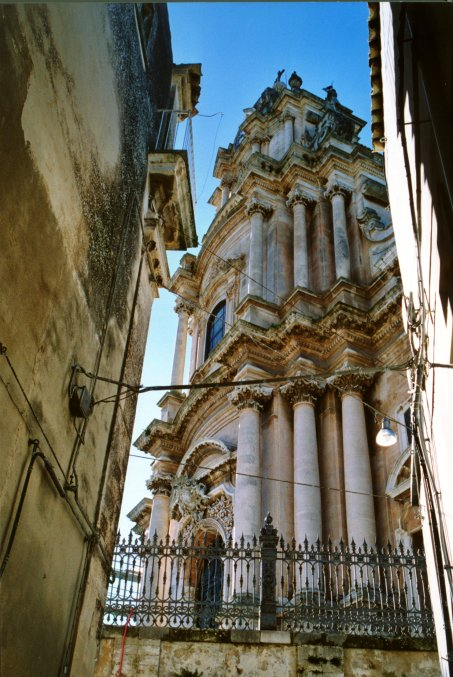
Cathedral of San Giorgio in Ragusa Ibla

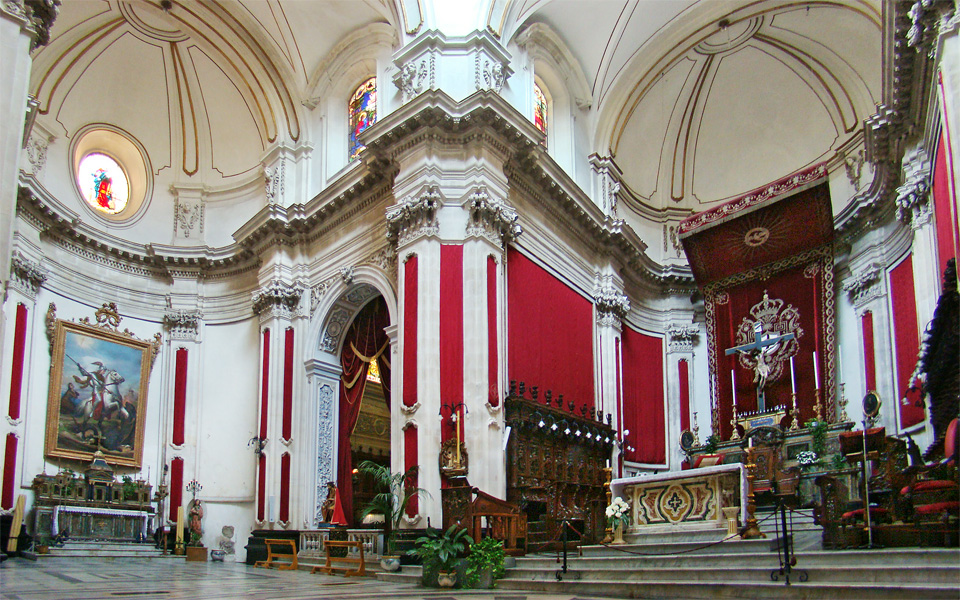
Interior of San Giorgio.

== In popular culture ==
Much of the filming of the Inspector Montalbano series is done in Ragusa, which has contributed to the rise of tourism in recent years.

== Twin towns – sister cities ==
Ragusa is twinned with:

- Dubrovnik, Croatia (itself formerly also named Ragusa)
- Mosta, Malta
- Rădăuți, Romania
- Termoli, Italy

== Notable people ==
- Princess Maria Paternò Arezzo (1869–1908), noblewoman and philanthropist
- Maria Occhipinti (1921–1996), anarcha-feminist
- Loredana Cannata (born 1975), actress
- Enea Scala (born 1979), operatic tenor
- Damiano Caruso (born 1987), cyclist

== See also ==
- Monti Iblei Cup (Hill Climb)
