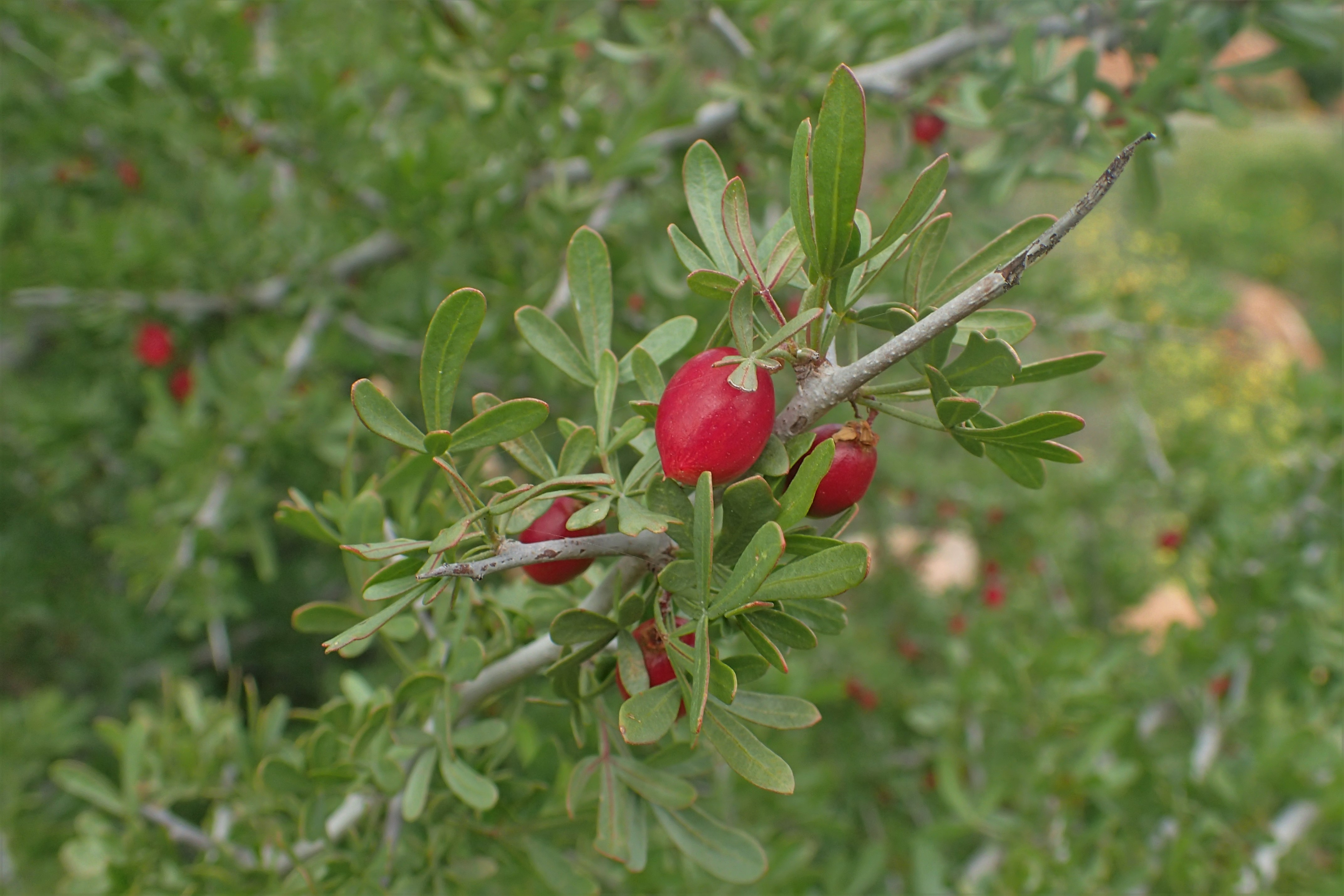
- Searsia pentaphylla in Tanant (Béni Mellal-Khénifra, Morocco)

Conservation status
- Least Concern (IUCN 3.1)

Scientific classification
- Kingdom: Plantae
- Clade: Tracheophytes
- Clade: Angiosperms
- Clade: Eudicots
- Clade: Rosids
- Order: Sapindales
- Family: Anacardiaceae
- Genus: Searsia
- Species: S. pentaphylla

Binomial name
- Searsia pentaphylla (Jacq.) F.A.Barkley ex Moffett

Synonyms
- Rhus pentaphylla (Jacq.) Desf.; Toxicodendron pentaphyllum (Jacq.) Kuntze; Rhamnus pentaphylla Jacq.

= Searsia pentaphylla =

Species of shrub

Searsia pentaphylla, the tazat tree in local Amazigh language, is a sumac shrub or small tree species in the genus Searsia found in North Africa, especially in Morocco and Algeria, the Levant, and Sicily.

== Description ==
Searsia pentaphylla is typically a thorny shrub or small tree. It is frost resistant.

== Range and habitat ==
Searsia pentaphylla is native to northwestern Africa, including Algeria, Morocco, Tunisia, and Western Sahara, and to Sicily, Israel, and Palestine. In Sicily it is found between Sampieri and Cava d'Aliga.

Its typical habitat is coastal shrubland in regions with a Mediterranean climate.

== Conservation and threats ==
The shrub is locally abundant in northwestern Africa, and its subpopulations there are considered stable. There are also multiple populations in coastal Israel and Palestine. The conservation status of the species is assessed as least concern.

The species has a limited distribution in Sicily, and is considered vulnerable there. Fewer than 1,000 mature individuals are known in Sicily. It had been found in Palermo, Sciacca, Linosa, San Vito Lo Capo, but may no longer be present there.

== Uses ==
Its roots and heartwood are used to produce tannin of the condensed type.
