= Salvatore Licitra =

Italian operatic tenor

- Born: 10 August 1968; Bern, Switzerland
- Died: 5 September 2011 (aged 43); Donnalucata, Ragusa, Italy
- Occupation: Tenor

Salvatore Licitra (10 August 1968 – 5 September 2011) was an Italian operatic tenor.

== Early life and debuts ==
Born in Bern, Switzerland, to Sicilian parents, Licitra grew up in Milan. He fell into opera by accident. As many tenors before him, he was not altogether confident about his vocal capabilities and started working as a graphic artist for Italian Vogue. At the age of 19 he began attending singing classes on a regular basis and enrolled at the Music Academy of Parma and the Corsi Verdiani. After 8 years of studies, initially as a choir vocalist, he left his voice teacher and enrolled at Carlo Bergonzi's voice academy in Busseto.

He debuted in Un ballo in maschera in Parma in 1998, in a performance for Bergonzi's students. His success led to a contract as cover in Ballo, Rigoletto and Aida in Verona, and he ended up singing them all. Buoyed by positive audience reception, he auditioned for Riccardo Muti at La Scala, who hired the young tenor for Alvaro in a new production of La forza del destino.

== At La Scala and other houses ==
In March 1999, he debuted at La Scala under Riccardo Muti in La forza del destino as Alvaro, then sang in Tosca and Madama Butterfly at the Arena di Verona in June and July, then Tosca at La Scala in March 2000, again with Muti. The performance was recorded and released on Sony Classical. In May he debuted in Madrid in La forza del destino, and in Verona, he was awarded the Premio Zenatello as tenor of the year, and sang in La forza del destino at the Arena in July. In September he traveled to Japan with the La Scala ensemble for performances of Forza. Milan honoured him with the Honorary Citizenship Medal, and Sony offered him an exclusive recording contract.

A performance of Il trovatore, recorded and issued by Sony, opened the 2000/2001 season at La Scala and the centennial of Verdi's death, the Anno Verdi. The opera had not been performed at La Scala in 22 years, and controversy ensued after Muti, who was the conductor and who had personally hand-picked Licitra for the role of Manrico, forbade his tenor to sing the traditional, interpolated high C of the 3rd act cabaletta "Di quella pira". There was an uproar in the audience, who booed the maestro's decision. Six months later Licitra sang the part again in Verona to great acclaim. Prior to Il trovatore in Verona, he had performed in Un ballo in maschera at La Scala under Muti, then repeated the success in Rome in December. In November he made his American debut as a guest soloist at the 26th annual Richard Tucker Music Foundation Opera Gala in New York. In December he left for Vienna and the Wiener Staatsoper to sing in Tosca, then Manrico in Il trovatore at the Sao Carlos in Lisbon in January 2002 and Alvaro (Forza) in Turin in February.

== The Met and beyond ==
The Metropolitan Opera followed unexpectedly on 11 May 2002 when he appeared in Tosca, substituting for Luciano Pavarotti, then 66, who had cancelled the performance two hours before curtain time. Licitra, who was not scheduled to debut there until 2004, was flown in by the Met as a back-up singer and eventually received a 43-second ovation at the conclusion of "Recondita armonia" and a 46-second ovation at the conclusion of "E lucevan le stelle". In the short time since his debut in 1998, Licitra was dubbed the New Pavarotti, a tenor "worthy of the great Italian tradition". The New York Times reported after his American debut with the Richard Tucker Gala: "... an Italian tenor with a deep baritonal lower range, a brighter upper register, and strong secure high notes [...] in true Italian tenor tradition [...] If he can withstand the inevitable "fourth tenor" hype, he could be one to watch". He subsequently added the title roles in Andrea Chénier, Ernani, Don Carlos, Turiddu in Cavalleria rusticana, Canio in Pagliacci, Dick in La fanciulla del West, and Luigi in Il tabarro, to his repertoire.

Licitra's final public appearance was a concert performance of Puccini's Tosca with the Chicago Symphony Orchestra at the Ravinia Festival on 30 July 2011. James Conlon conducted, and the cast included Patricia Racette and Bryn Terfel.

== Death ==
On 27 August 2011, Licitra sustained severe head and chest injuries when he suffered a cerebral hemorrhage while riding his motor scooter and crashed into a wall in Donnalucata, Scicli, Ragusa Province, Sicily. He remained in a coma for nine days in the Garibaldi Hospital in Catania and was pronounced dead on 5 September 2011. His body was taken to lie in repose in Catania's opera house, the Teatro Massimo Bellini.
