= San Bartolomeo, Scicli =

Roman Catholic church in Sicily, Italy

Coordinates: 36°47′27.5″N 14°42′30.2″E

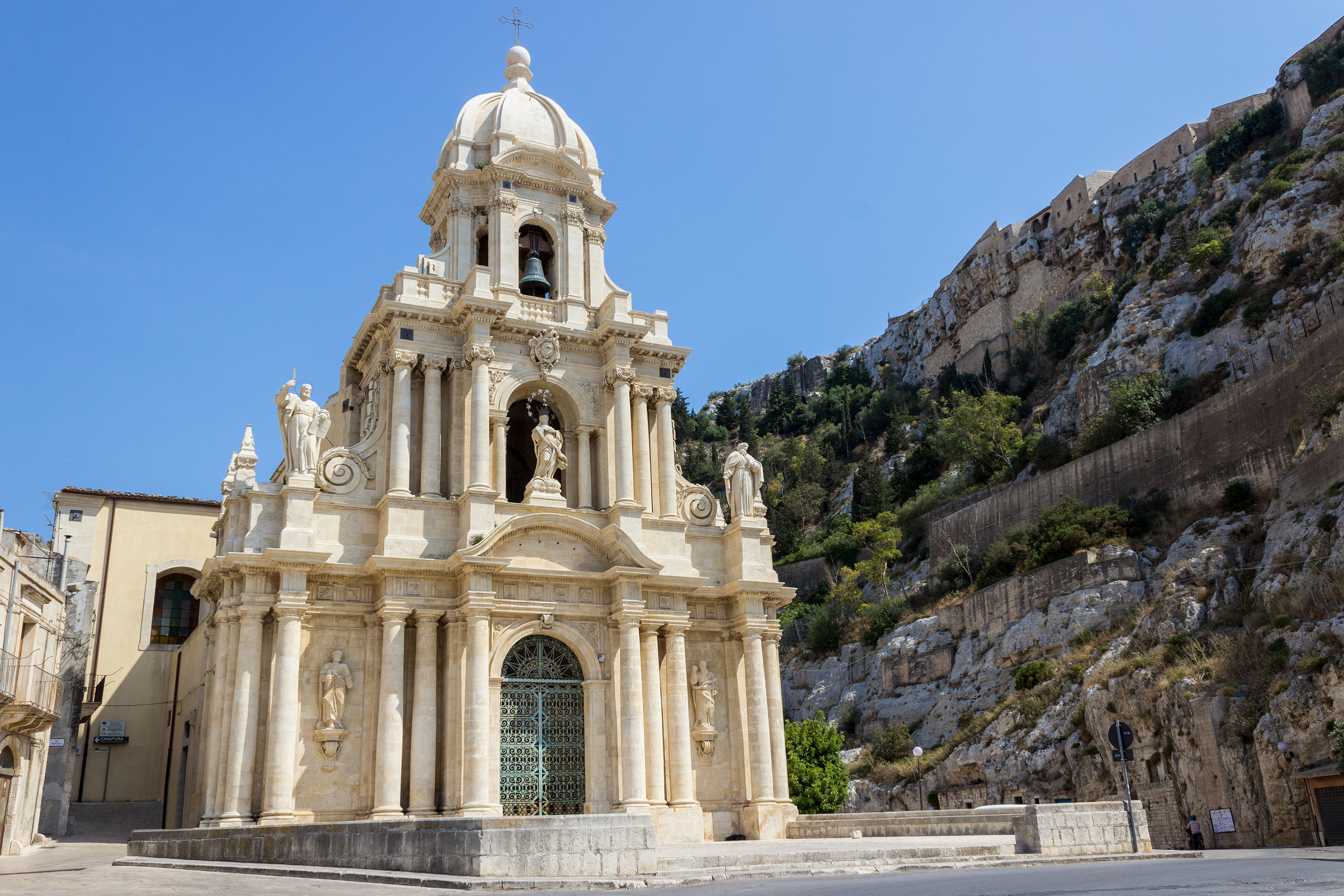
View of the church

San Bartolomeo is a late Baroque-style, Roman Catholic church in the town of Scicli, province of Ragusa, Sicily, Italy.

== History ==
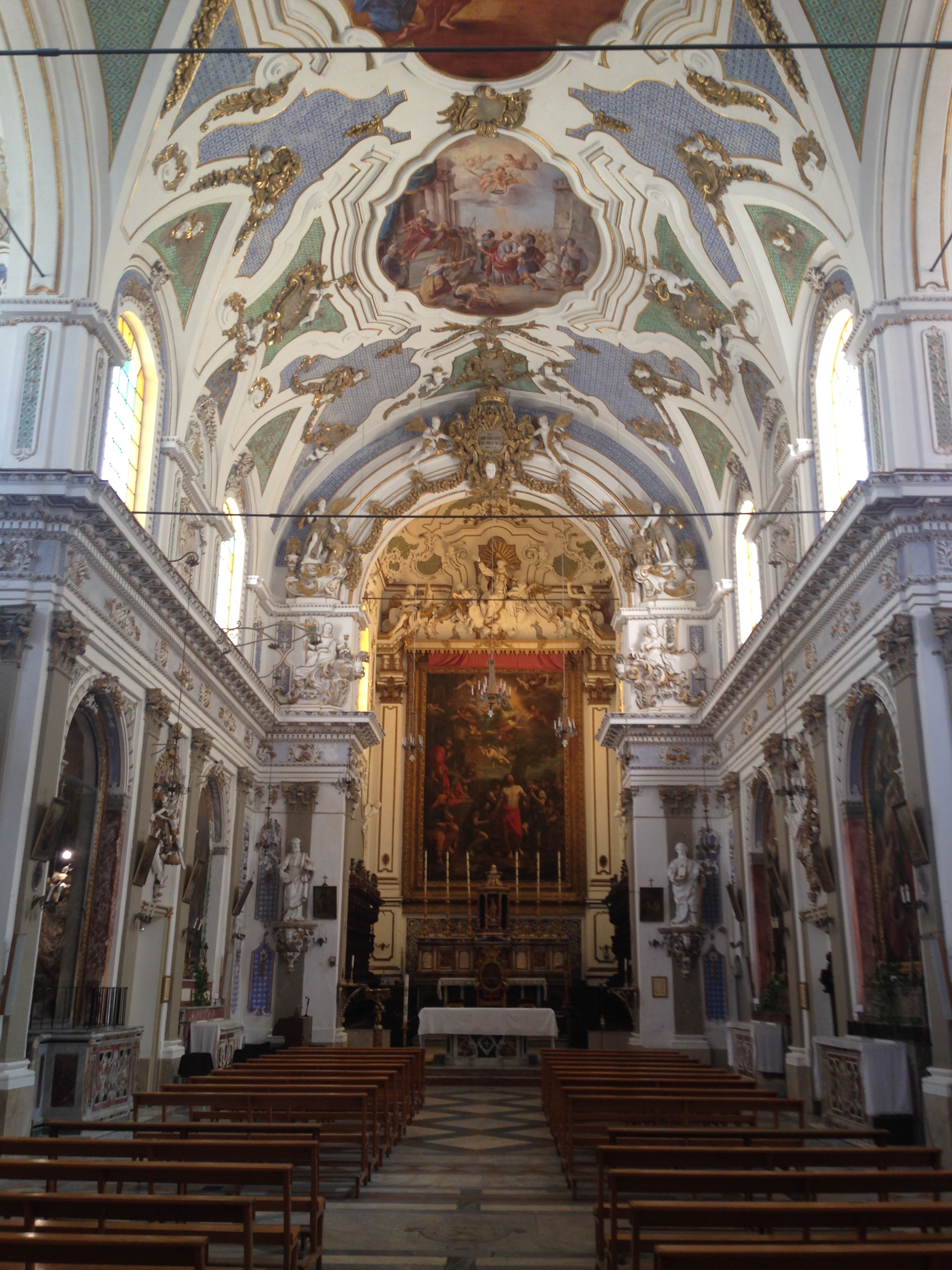
The interior of the church

A church at the site was present by the 15th century, but the frequent earthquakes that afflict Sicily, including a local tremor in 1693, may have forced the reconstruction of the church to begin in 1752. The facade transitions from late-Baroque to Neoclassical, starting with 18th-century designs by Antonio Mazza, modified later by Salvatore Alì and with the top completed in 1815 by Father Ventura. The iron gate in the portal was designed by Alì in 1822.

The facade presents a triangular front, with columns rising from Doric to Ionic to Corinthian, and culminating in a belfry with a ribbed dome. The roofline houses a statue of Madonna and Child, flanked by two pairs of saints, Peter, Paul del Marabitti, Bartholomew and William.

The interior has a single nave, with a Latin cross plan. The entrance is flanked by tomb monuments of the Micciche family (1631) sculpted by Francesco Lucchese. The church houses a silver processional reliquary/crib, covered in silver in 1862, which housed an icon of the child Jesus, called the Golden Cicidda, and carried in procession on Christmas Day.

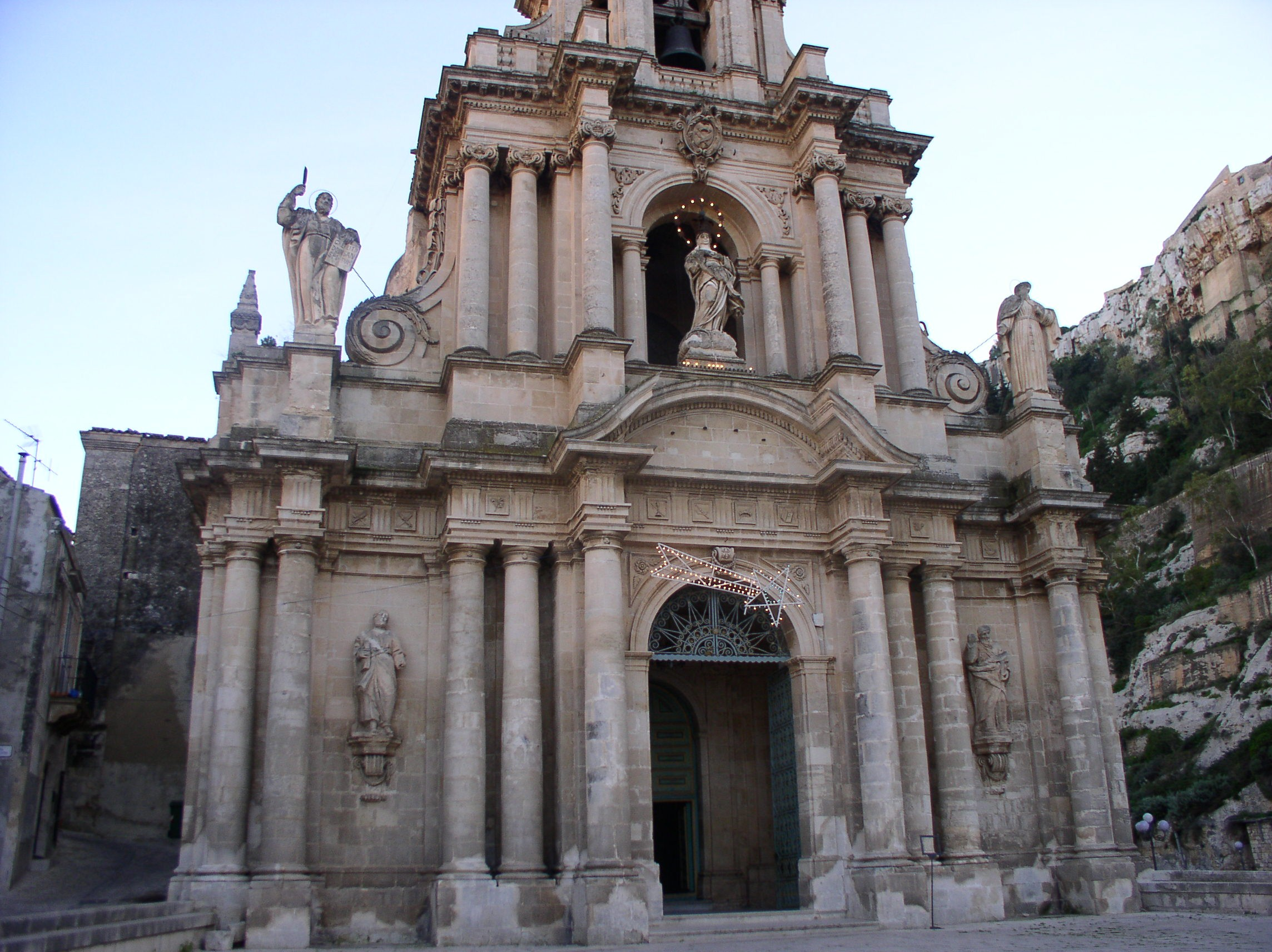
The facade of the church

In the north transept is arrayed a grand Presepe, or Nativity, (1773-1776) sculpted by Pietro Padula. Of the original 65 statues there are only 29. The backgrounds may be more recent. Adjacent to Nativity Chapel, is the Chapel of the Immaculate Conception with a silver coated statue, made in 1850 by the brothers Catera.

Among the painted artworks in the church are:

- "Immaculate Conception with Saints Bartholomew and William" by Francesco Cassarino, found next to Addolorata chapel.
- "Martyrdom of St Bartholomew" (1779) by Francesco Pascucci.
- Allegory of Abundance, of the Law and of the Fortress, by Giovanni Battista Ragazzi in the apse.
- "Deposition" attributed to Mattia Preti, derived from the monastery church of the Capuccini, transferred to the sacristy in 1923.
