= Sant'Ignazio, Scicli =

Italian church

Coordinates: 36°47′33″N 14°42′25″E

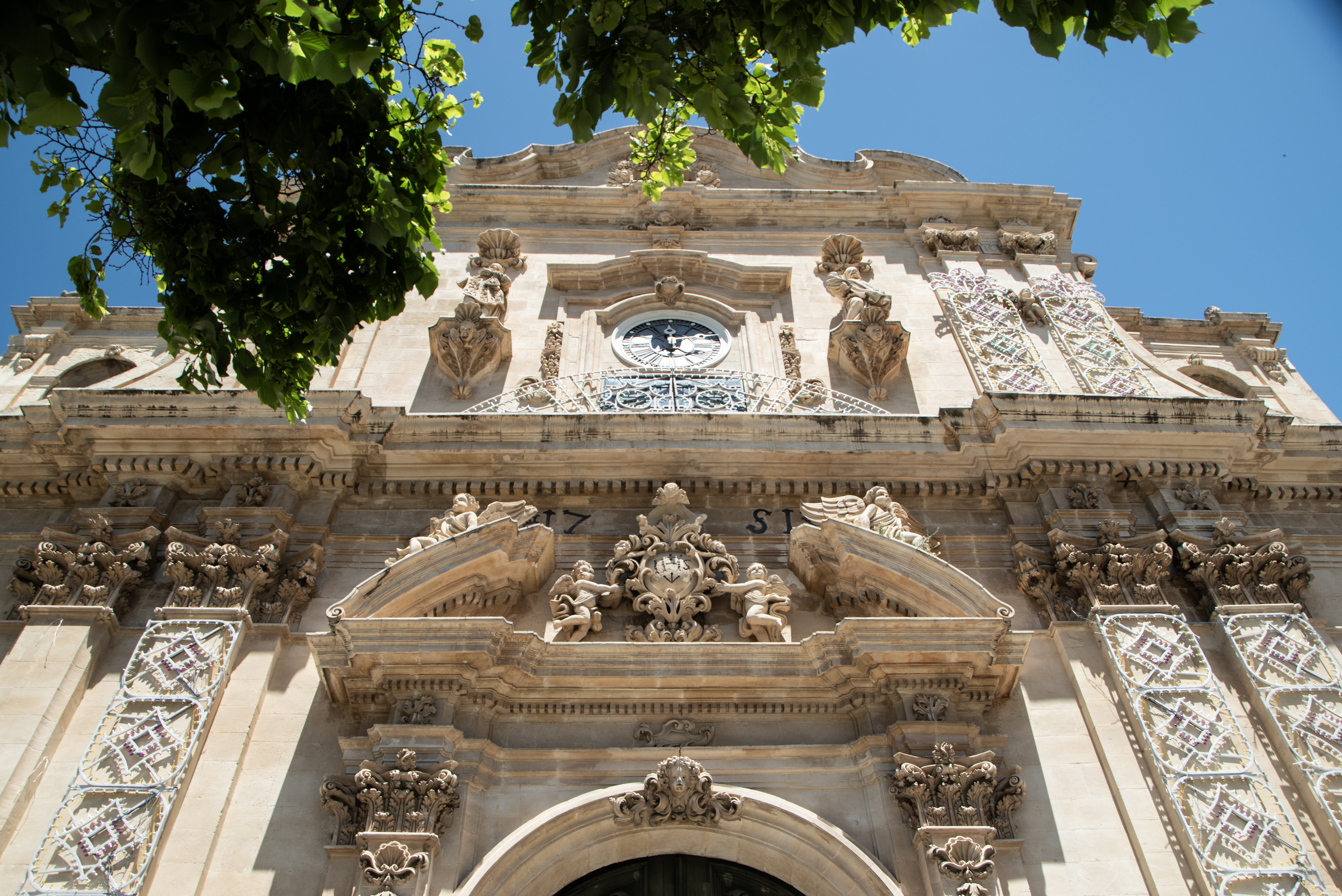
Facade of Sant'Ignazio, as viewed from the bottom

The Mother Church of Sant'Ignazio is a Baroque-style, Roman Catholic church in the town of Scicli, province of Ragusa, Sicily, Italy.

== History ==
A church at the site was present here by the late 17th century, but destroyed by the earthquake of 1693. The adjacent Jesuit college was also destroyed, and both were completely rebuilt by 1751.

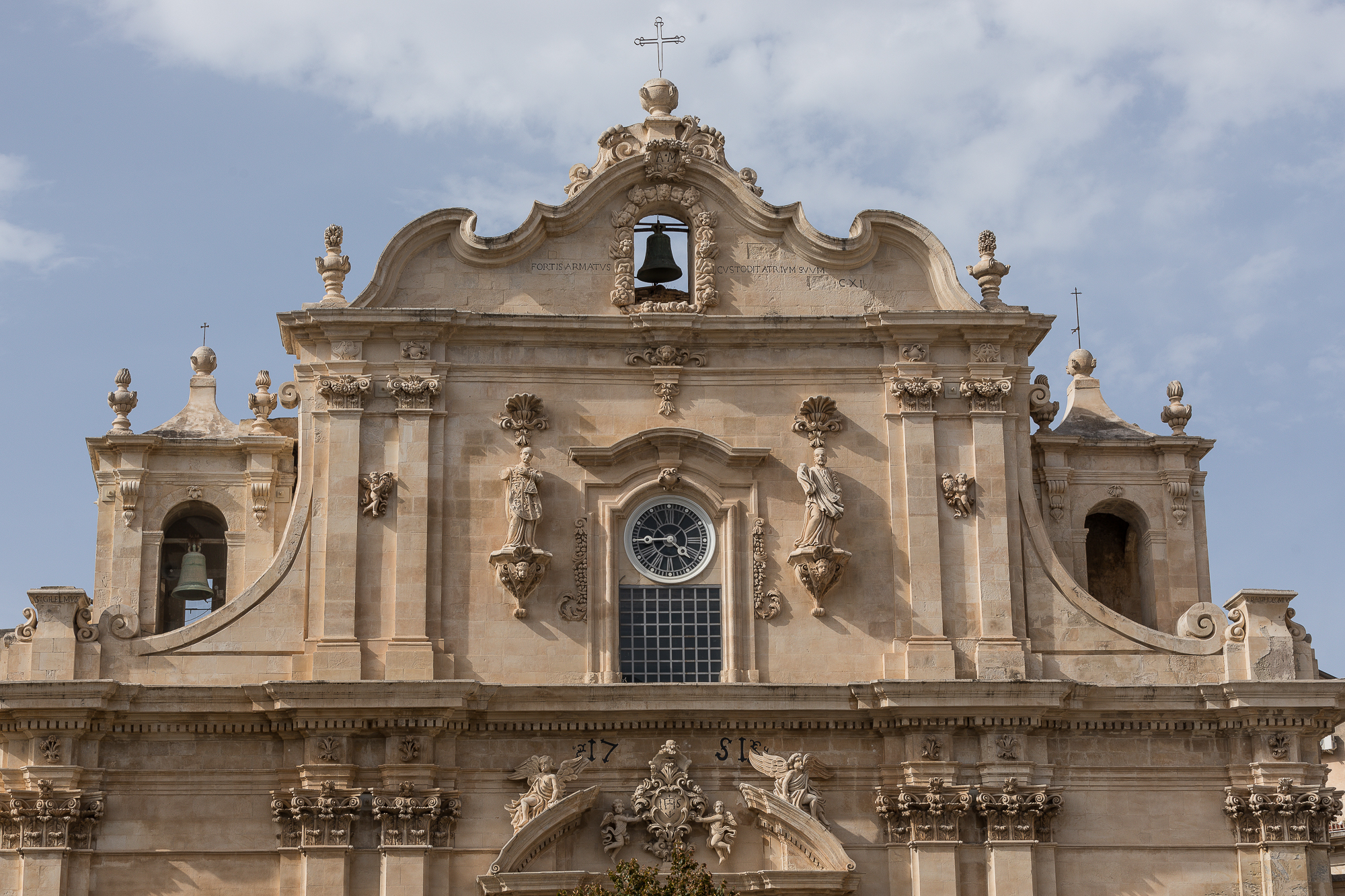
Sant'Ignazio, Scicli

The undulating façade has four statues in niches, and contains a town clock. Inside the church has a large central nave, and two aisles, with separating pilasters. It has three chapels, two dedicated to the town patrons, while the third honored the Madonna delle Milizie, depicted in a canvas (1780) by Francesco Pascucci as draped with a blue mantle, astride a bucking white horse, and holding a sword. The horse tramples and scatters two Saracens. The canvas is found between the second and third chapel, it originated from the Eremo delle Milizie. The derivation of this militant Marian iconography is attributed to the 11th century, when the Normans battled the occupying Saracens.

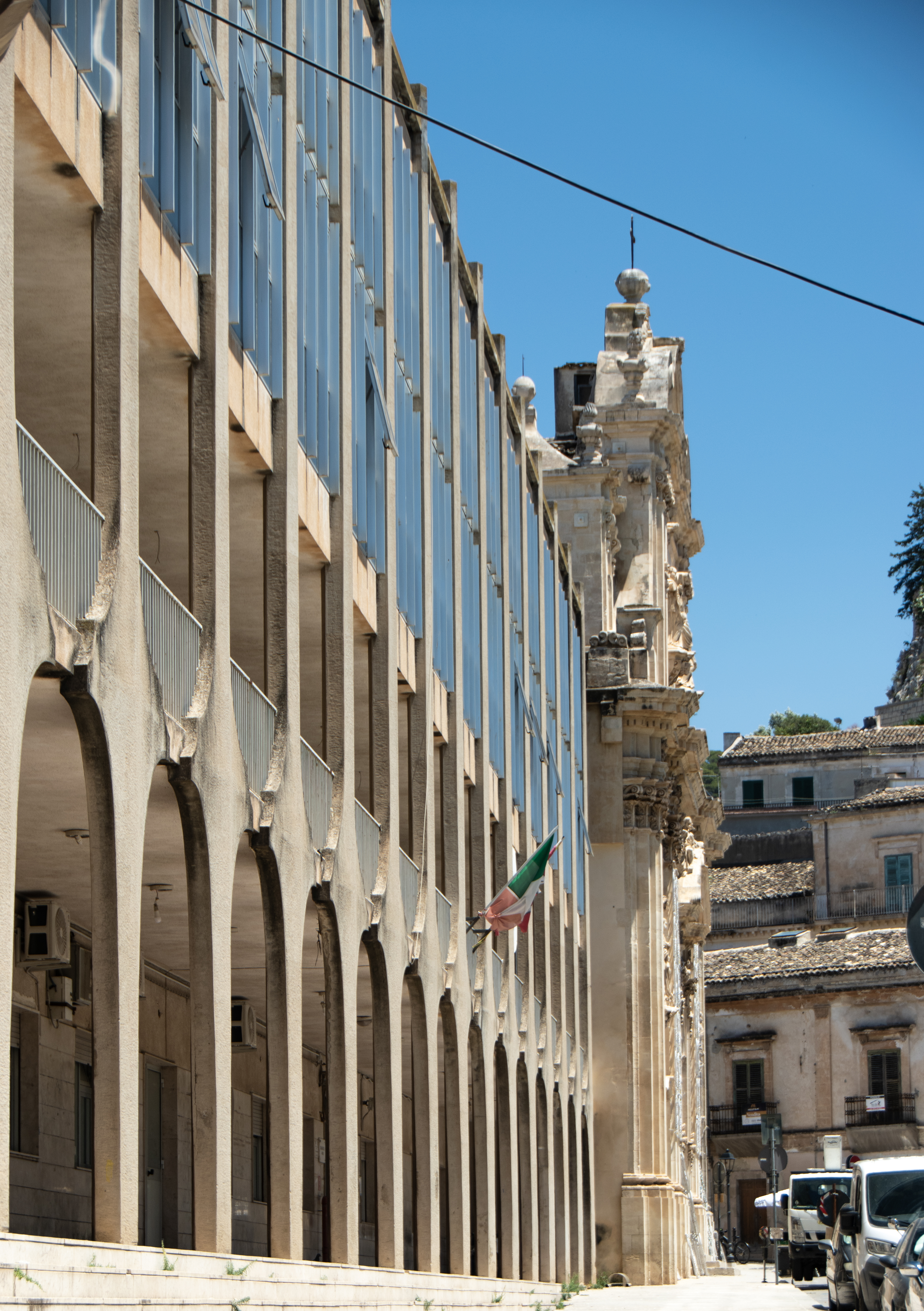
The new school in place of the adjacent Jesuit monastery (Istituto Comprensivo Giovanni Dantoni-Scuola Secondaria di Primo Grado)

Other canvases also derive from suppressed churches, including the Madonna del Carmine with Carmelite Saints (1731) by Pietro Azzarelli and a canvas depicting a Conversation of Saints. The third chapel, dedicated to San Guglielmo: has a reliquary ark from the 17th-18th century with a bust of St William. A panel on the urn depicts Scicli in those centuries. A tomb marker (1565) derives from the church of San Matteo. On the left of the nave is the Chapel of the Holiest Sacrament. In the right nave is canvas depicting St William before Scicli (1721) by Antonio Manoli.

This church became the main church of the town in 1874 with the closure of San Matteo, in 1986, it was rededicated to San Guglielmo Eremita. The adjacent Jesuit monastery was razed in 1961 to build a new school.
