= Santa Maria La Nova =

Santa Maria La Nova may refer to:

- Santa Maria La Nova, Campagna, hamlet in Campagna, Italy
- Santa Maria La Nova, Caltanissetta, cathedral in Caltanissetta, Italy
- Santa Maria La Nova, Naples, church building in Naples, Italy
- Santa Maria La Nova, Scicli, church building in Scicli, Italy

== See also ==
- Santa Maria Nova (disambiguation)
