= Sampieri =

- Frazione
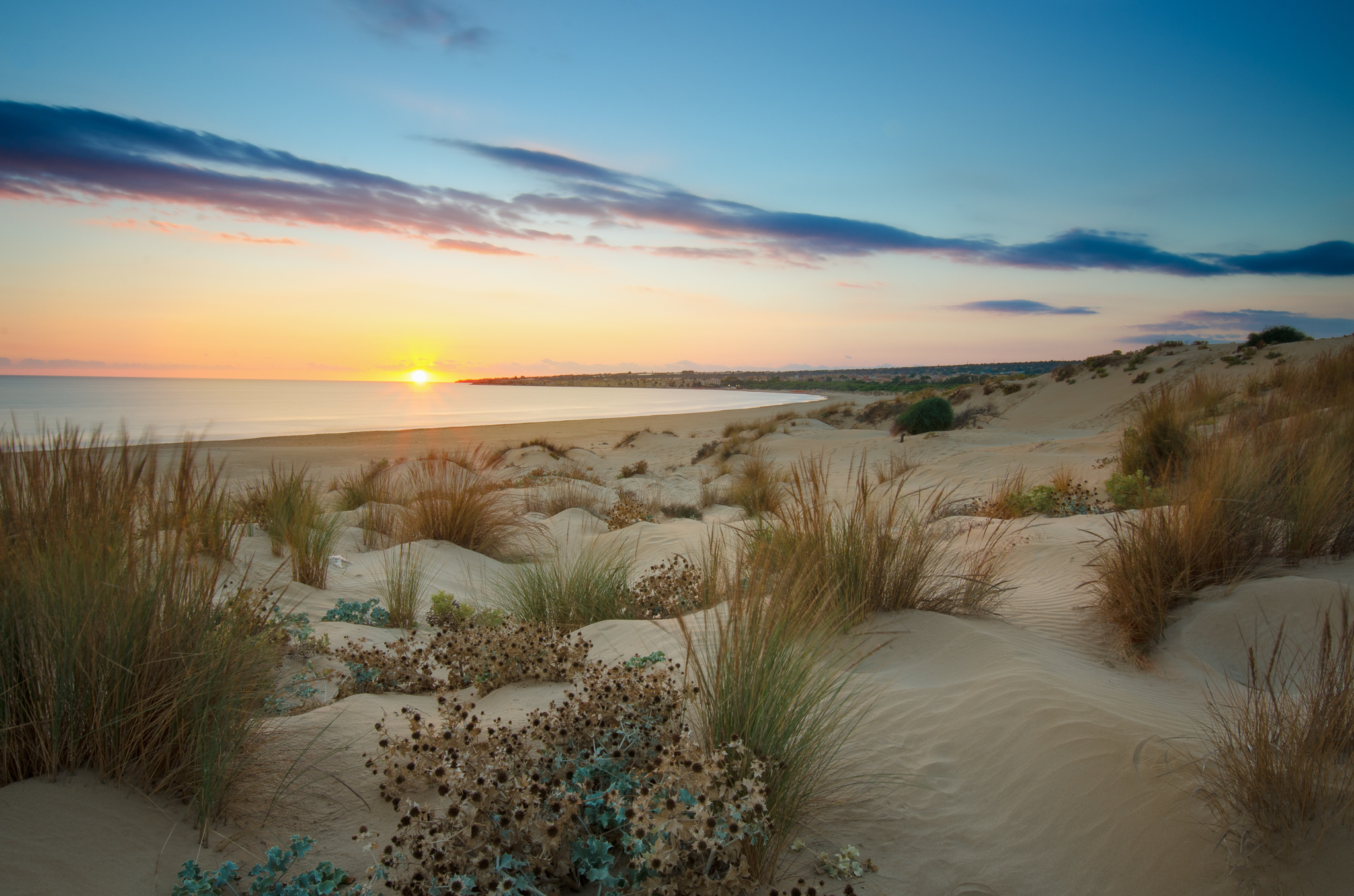
- Sunset on Sampieri's beach

- Location of Sampieri in Italy
- Coordinates: 36°43′18.4″N 14°44′13.7″E
- Country: Italy
- Region: Sicily
- Province: Ragusa (RG)
- Comune: Scicli
- Elevation: 10 m (33 ft)

Population (2011)
  - Total: 669
- Demonym: Sampiruoti / Sampieroti
- Time zone: UTC+1 (CET)
  - Summer (DST): UTC+2 (CEST)
- Postal code: 97018
- Dialing code: (+39) 0932
- Website: Official website

Sampieri (Sicilian: Sampèri) is a southern Italian fishing village and hamlet (frazione) of Scicli, a municipality in the Province of Ragusa, Sicily. In 2011 it had a population of 669.

== History ==
Originally settled in the 6th century BC with the name of Apolline, it was known as Marsa Siklah (Scicli Harbour) during the Arab domination of Sicily.

== Geography ==
The village is located by the Mediterranean Coast, between Cava d'Aliga (3 km west) and Marina di Modica (4 km east). It is 10 km from Scicli, 11 from Pozzallo, 12 from Donnalucata, 22 from Marina di Ragusa and Ispica, 25 from Modica and Rosolini, and 38 from Ragusa. Sampieri railway station, located just outside the village, is part of the Canicattì-Gela-Ragusa-Syracuse railway.

== Main sights ==
The Fornace Penna, a brickyard built in 1909 in the locality Pisciotto, represents an industrial archaeological monument. With the fictional name of Mànnara, the furnace was filmed in several episodes of the Italian TV series Inspector Montalbano.

== Gallery ==
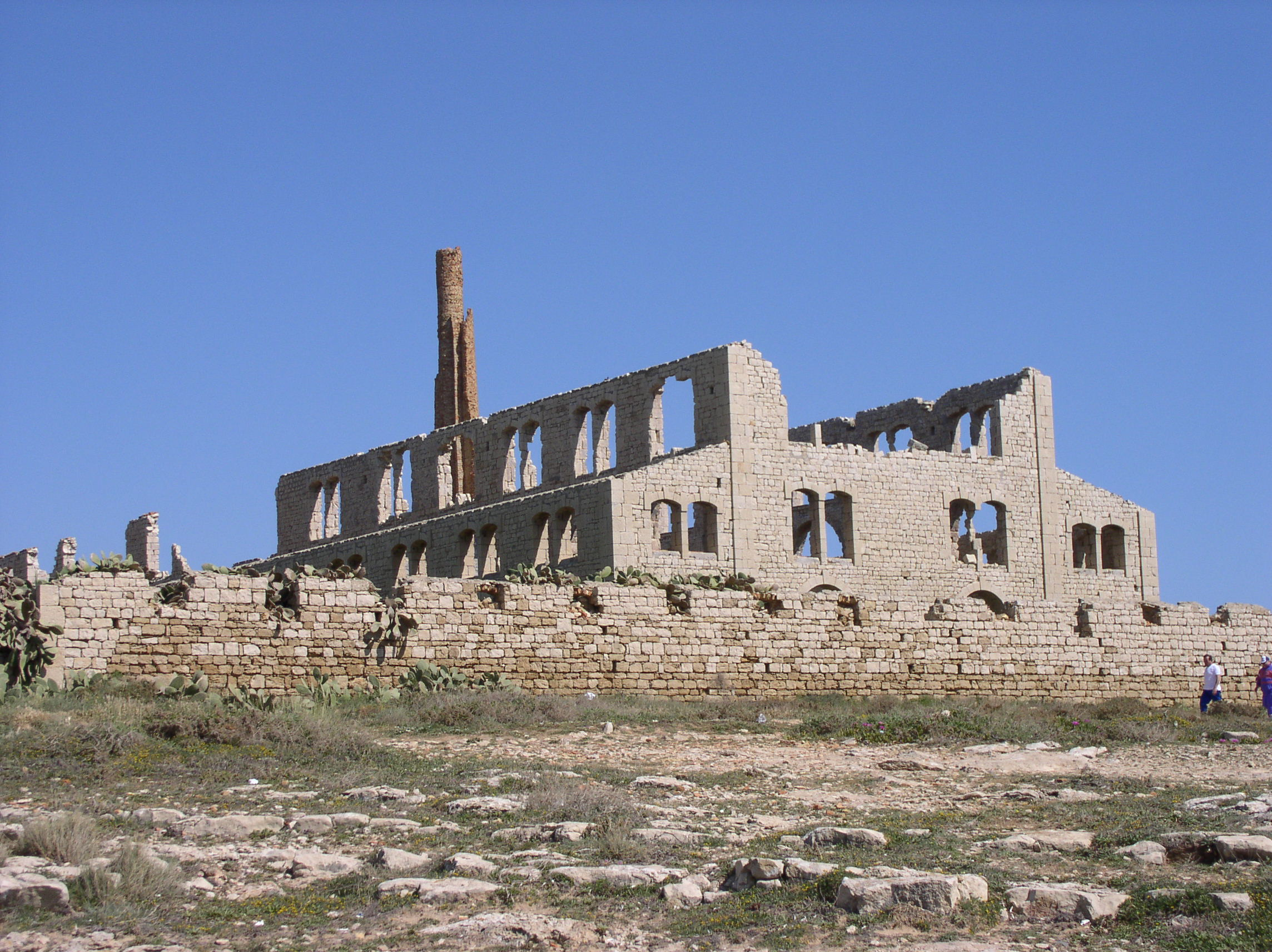
Fornace Penna

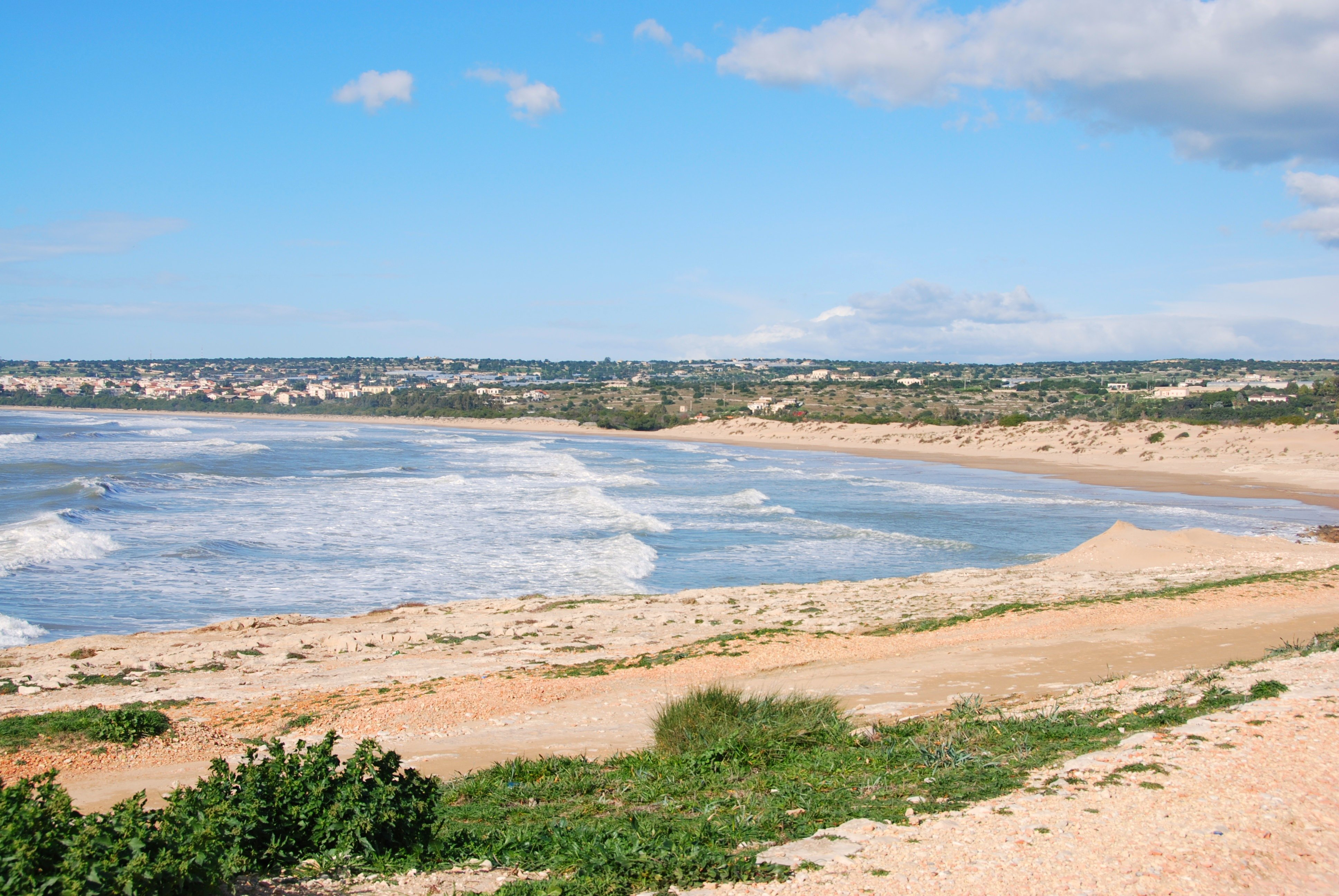
The beach of Sampieri
