= Santa Maria Nova =

Santa Maria Nova or Santa Maria Nuova may refer to:

== Churches in Italy ==
- Santa Maria Nuova, Cortona
- Santa Francesca Romana, Rome
- Santa Maria Nuova, Fano, a church in Fano
- Monreale Cathedral (Cattedrale di Santa Maria Nuova di Monreale), Palermo
- Santa Maria Nuova, Pistoia
- Santa Maria Nova, Toffia
- Santa Maria Nova, Vicenza
- Santa Maria Nuova, Viterbo

== Other ==
- Santa Maria Nuova, Marche, a commune in italy

== See also ==
- Santa Maria La Nova (disambiguation)
- Hospital of Santa Maria Nuova, Florence, Italy
