= San Michele Arcangelo, Scicli =

Church in Scicli, Italy

Coordinates: 36.7934°N 14.7054°E

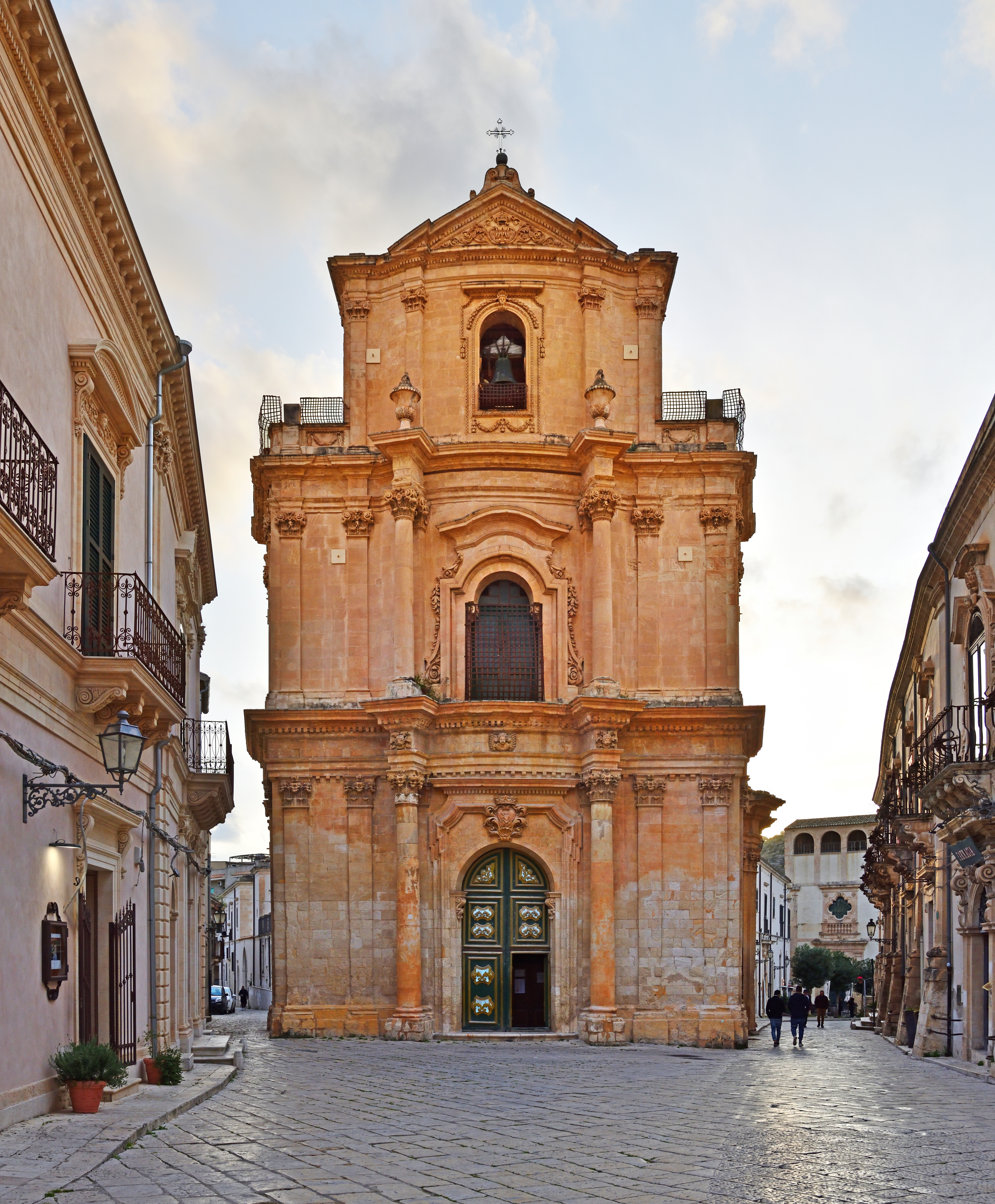
Scicli StMichaelArchangelChurch 010 1416.jpg

San Michele Arcangelo is a Baroque-style, Roman Catholic church in the town of Scicli, province of Ragusa, Sicily, Italy.

== History ==
A church at the site was likely established prior to the 15th century, but the present church was rebuilt after the major earthquake of 1693. The architect Alessi began work after 1750, and work was concluded by the mid-1800s under the architect Fama of Palermo. The façade is scenographic and contains windows framed by garlands.

The nave is elliptical and ends in a semicylindrical apse. The interior is rich in scagliola and frescoes. The balcony beside the organ and has some stuccoes depicting musical instruments. The lateral altars have 19th-century canvases depicting St Augustine, St Michael Archangel, and an Adoration of the Magi. The fourth altar has a 15th-century crucifix. The main altarpiece in the apse is an oval depicting the Madonna delle Grazie by an 18th-century painter. In 1770, the adjacent Augustinian nunnery was built. It is presently a nursing home for the elderly.
