= Donnalucata =

- Frazione
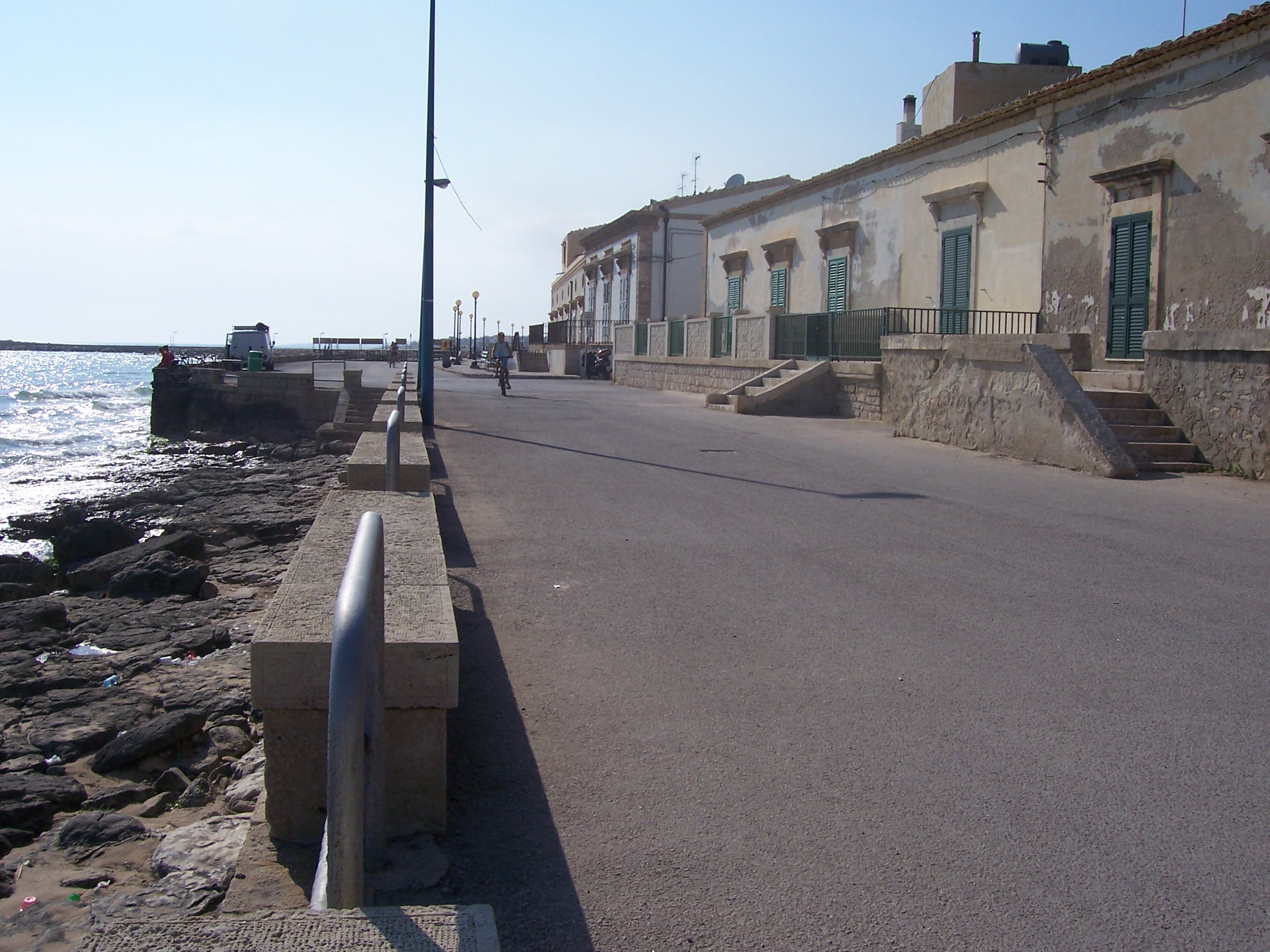
- View of the seafront promenade

- Location of Donnalucata in southwestern Sicily

- Location of Donnalucata in Italy
- Coordinates: 36°45′51.63″N 14°38′26.69″E
- Country: Italy
- Region: Sicily
- Province: Ragusa (RG)
- Comune: Scicli
- Elevation: 10 m (33 ft)

Population (2011)
  - Total: 3,172
- Demonym: Donnalucatesi
- Time zone: UTC+1 (CET)
  - Summer (DST): UTC+2 (CEST)
- Postal code: 97018
- Dialing code: (+39) 0932
- Website: Official website

Donnalucata (Sicilian: Ronnalucata) is a southern Italian fishing village and hamlet (frazione) of Scicli, a municipality in the Province of Ragusa, Sicily. In 2011 it had a population of 3,172.

== History ==
The area has been inhabited since Greek and Phoenician times. during the Roman era it was called Cymbe.

=== Etymology ===
Donnalucata stems from the Arabic Ayn al-Awqat, which means the "fountain of the times." The name stems from the discovery by an Arab man of a spring in Donnalucata that only flowed five times a day at the same time as the Muslim prayers.

== Geography ==
The village is located by the Mediterranean Coast, between Playa Grande (3 km west), Cava d'Aliga (8 km east) and Scicli (9 km south). It is 11 km from Marina di Ragusa, 12 from Sampieri, 18 from Modica, 30 from Ragusa and 139 from Catania.

== Economy ==
The village has a small fishing port and sandy beaches on either side of the harbour. The local economy is based on fishing, intensive agriculture in greenhouses and during the summer season, tourism.
