= Santa Maria La Nova, Scicli =

Church building in Scicli, Italy

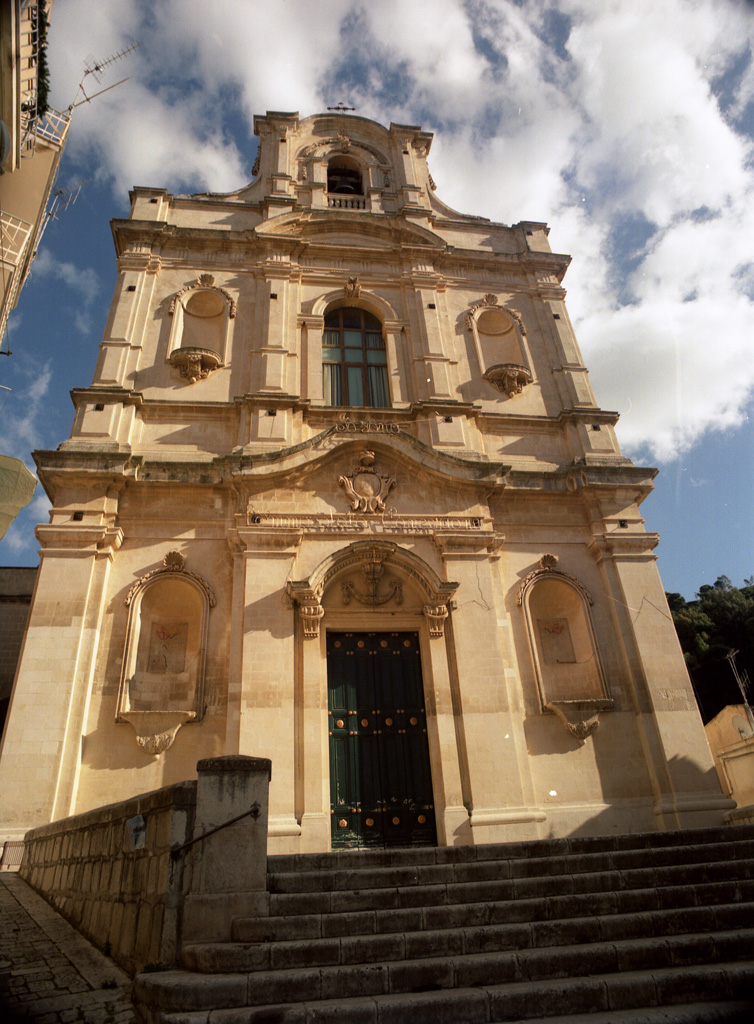
Santa Maria la Nova, facade

Santa Maria La Nova, also known as Santa Maria della Pietà, is a Baroque-style, Roman Catholic church in the town of Scicli, province of Ragusa, Sicily, Italy. It is the main Marian sanctuary in the town.

== History ==
A church at the site, dedicated to Santa Maria della Pietà, was present by the 6th-7th centuries. This church was destroyed during the Norman conquest. Reconstruction under the sponsorship of the Confraternity of the same name was funded by Pietro Di Lorenzo Busacca that, doing the will in 1567. The rebuilt church was then destroyed by the 1693 earthquake.

Like most other churches in town, it has a facade with three orders, divided into three compartments by pilasters, two Ionic and one Corinthian. The third story links to a belltower with a stone balustrade. The original designer was Giovanni Venancio Marvuglia, but his work was carried out by Cardona, with the interior stucco decoration completed in 1801 by Emanuele and Domenico Ruiz. The nave is flanked by three chapels on each side with a dome at the crossing. The upper story and vaults of the nave were begun in 1817 and the stuccoes not completed until 1851 by Gianforma. The church was reconsecrated in 1857.

The church has the following chapels:

- San Francesco di Paola, 1st chapel on right, has a statue derived from the suppressed church of the same name.
- Immaculate Conception, 2nd chapel on right, contains a wooden icon of the Immaculate Virgin Mary, sculpted in 1843 by G. Petronzio, and covered in silver plate in 1844 by Don Silvestro Catera and children.
- Resurrection, 3rd chapel on the right, contains a wooden icon of the Risen Christ (1796), popularly known as "Uomo Vivo", attributed to Francesco Pastore.
- St Joseph and Child Jesus, 1st chapel on left, contains a 17th-century statue.
- Vergine della Pietà, 2nd chapel on left, contains a 17th-century statue of the Madonna of Mercy. The statue derives from the church prior to the 16th century.
- Madonna delle "Nevi, 3rd chapel on left, has a statue of the Madonna and Child 1496. The base is decorated with bas-reliefs, illustrating the Life of St. Anne; The Meeting of Joachim with the shepherds, the Birth of Mary, and the Annunciation to Joachim.

In the vault are five paintings (1858) by the priest G. Di Stefano, depicting scenes from the life of Christ: Adoration of the Shepherds, Presentation at the Temple, Jesus among the doctors, Christ and the Holy Women, and a Deposition. Among the interior works is the monumental canvas depicting the Nativity of Mary, once attributed to Sebastiano Conca, but now attributed to Tomasso Pollace. The church has a silver reliquary urn with reliefs of various subjects, including depictions of San Guglielmo, San Giuseppe, and the Martyrdom of Sant'Adriano. The latter is depicted in a painting in the right aisle.
