= Scicli =

- Comune
- Comune di Scicli
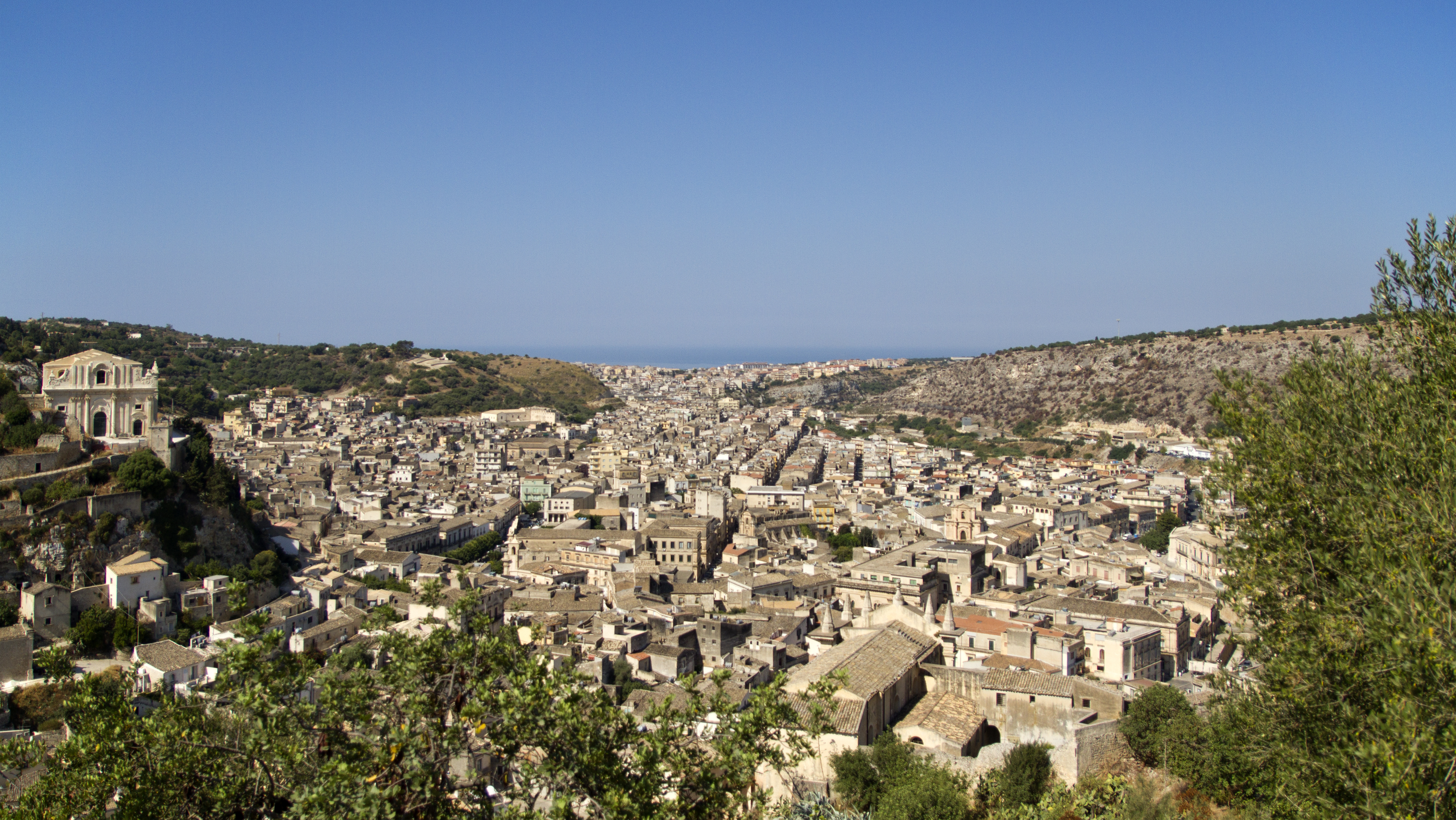
- Panoramic view, 2014

- Flag Coat of arms

- Scicli within the Free Municipal Consortium of Ragusa

- Location within Italy Location within Sicily
- Coordinates: 36°47′17″N 14°41′52″E
- Country: Italy
- Region: Sicily
- Province: Ragusa (RG)
- Frazioni: Arizza, Bruca, Cava d'Aliga, Donnalucata, Playa Grande, Sampieri

Government
  - Mayor: Mario Marino

Area
  - Total: 138.72 km^{2} (53.56 sq mi)
- Elevation: 108 m (354 ft)

Population (31 December 2017)
  - Total: 27,051
  - Density: 195.00/km^{2} (505.06/sq mi)
- Demonym: Sciclitani
- Time zone: UTC+1 (CET)
  - Summer (DST): UTC+2 (CEST)
- Postal code: 97018
- Dialing code: 0932
- Patron saint: Madonna of the Milices
- Saint day: Last Saturday of May
- Website: Official website

UNESCO World Heritage Site
- Part of: Late Baroque Towns of the Val di Noto (South-Eastern Sicily)
- Criteria: Cultural: (i)(ii)(iv)(v)
- Reference: 1024rev-008
- Inscription: 2002 (26th Session)
- Area: 0.82 ha (88,000 sq ft)
- Buffer zone: 5.18 ha (558,000 sq ft)

Scicli is a town and municipality in the Province of Ragusa in the south east of Sicily, southern Italy. It is 25 kilometres (16 mi) from Ragusa, and 188 kilometres (117 mi) from Palermo, and has a population (2017) of 27,051. Alongside seven other cities in the Val di Noto, it has been listed as one of UNESCO's World Heritage Sites.

The municipality borders with Modica and Ragusa.

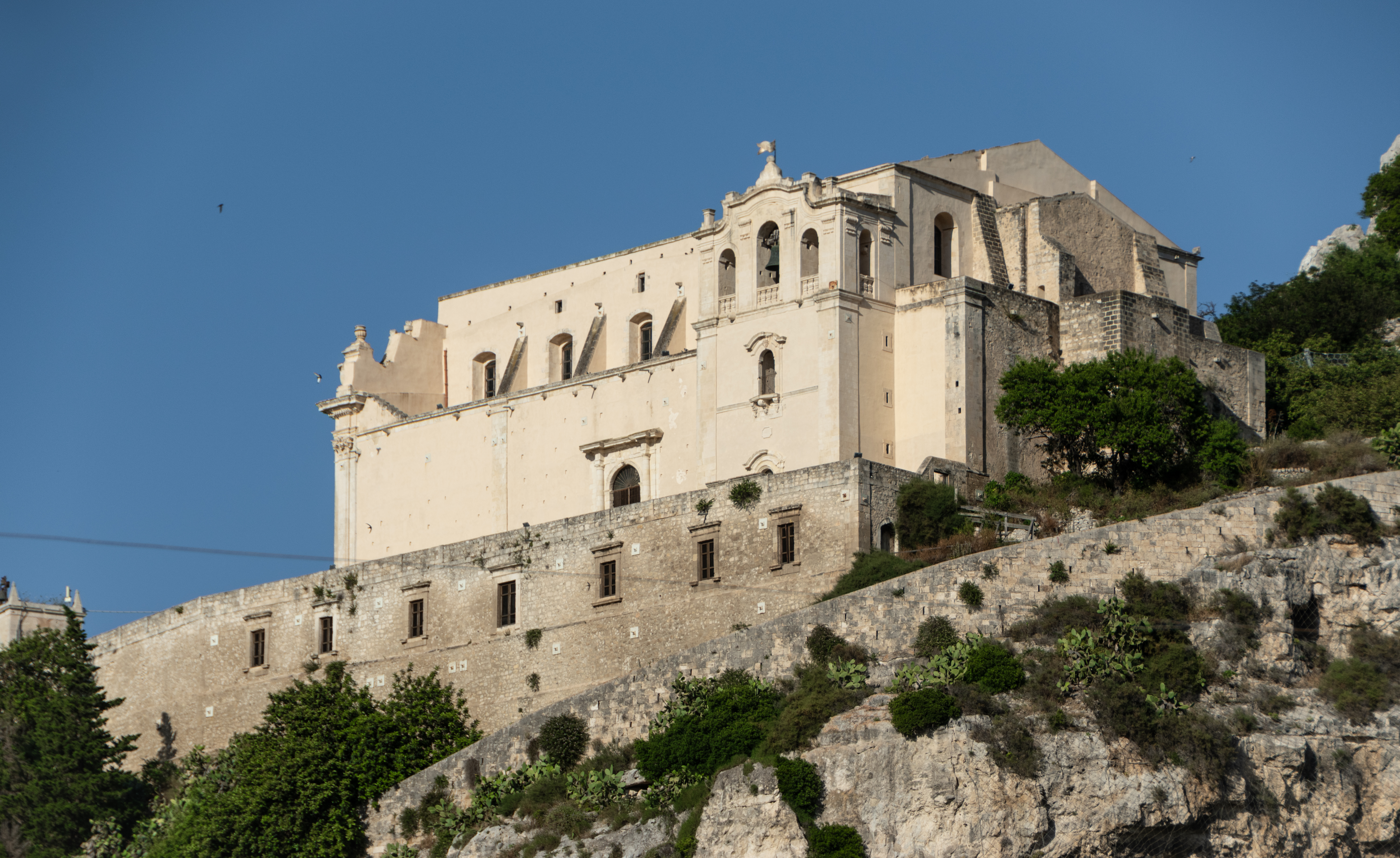
Church of San Matteo.

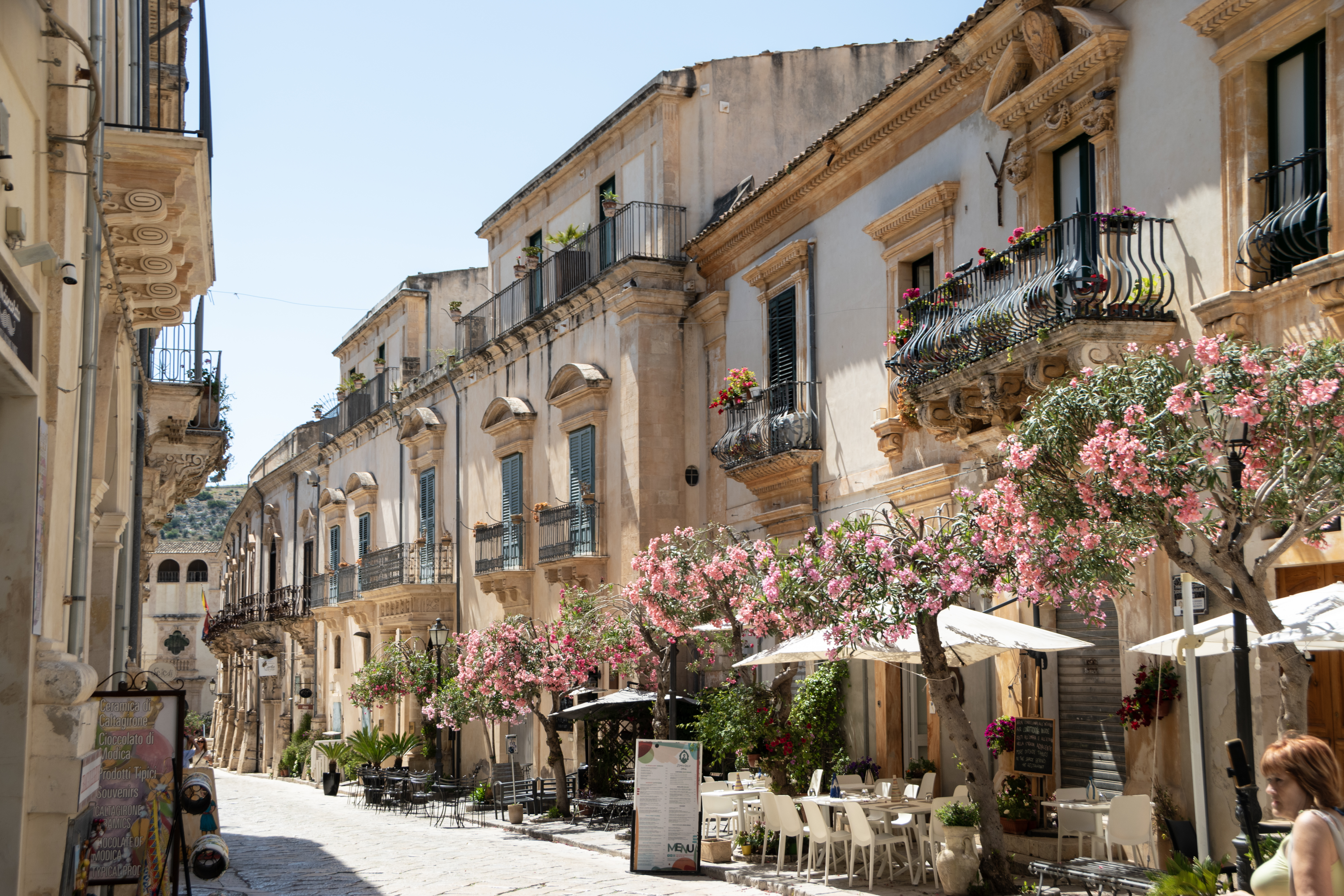
Via Francesco Mormino Penna, the main street of Scicli

== History ==
Settlements of the area of Scicli dates back to the Copper and Early Bronze Ages (3rd millennium BC to the 15th century BC).

Scicli was founded by the Sicels (whence probably the name) around 300 BC.

In 864 AD, Scicli was conquered by the Arabs, as part of the Muslim conquest of Sicily. Under their rule it flourished as an agricultural and trade centre. According to geographer Muhammad al-Idrisi, "shipping reached Scicli in Sicily from Calabria, Africa, Malta and many other places."

In 1091, it was conquered from the Arabs by the Normans, under Roger I of Hauteville, after a fierce battle. Scicli was one of the garrison which rebelled against the Angevine domination in the Sicilian Vespers (April 5, 1282). The ruling Aragonese-Spanish kings formed the County of Modica and initially placed it under the rule of the Chiaramonte family. From there it became a feudal fief of the Cabrera family until nearly the mid-18th century. A number of counts from the House of Alba nominally held possession until the county became part of the Kingdom of Italy in the mid 19th century.

Following a catastrophic earthquake in 1693, much of the town was rebuilt in the Sicilian baroque style, which today gives the town the elegant appearance which draws many tourists to visit it.

== Main sights ==
- San Matteo: this was the local "mother church" of the town until 1874. It is located on the eponymous hill in the old city, where there is also the ruin of an Arab/Norman castle.
- Santa Maria la Nova: church with a large Neoclassic façade. The interior houses a cypress-wood statue of Madonna della Pietà, probably of Byzantine origin.
- San Bartolomeo baroque church
- Sant'Ignazio (Mother Church of St Ignatius of Loyola), houses the highly venerated image of Madonna dei Milìci (see Culture section).
- San Michele Arcangelo
- Palazzo Fava, one of the first and largest Baroque palaces in the town. Notable are the late-Baroque decorations of the portal and the balconies, especially the one on the Via San Bartolomeo.
- The Town Hall, the Palazzo Spadaro and the Palazzo Beneventano, all boast Baroque decorations.

== Culture ==
Scicli is frequently used as a film set, most recently for Marco Bellocchio's Il regista dei matrimoni and is popular in Italy as the location of the police station (Commissariato) of Il Commissario Montalbano, the popular television series broadcast by RAI.

The town is also notable for its religious processions which includes "Presepe" (nativity scenes) enacted in the caves surrounding the city at Christmas time. These caves, known as the Chiarafura caves, were dug out in the tuff cliffs, and some were inhabited by the local poor as recently as 1958.

At Easter, the town celebrates with the "Uomo Vivo" parade which involves a long religious procession through the city. A decorated horse parade takes place in March, from Scicli to the neighbouring town of Donnalucata. The most spectacular religious festival, the A Maronna i Milici occurs in May, commemorating the appearance of the Madonna on a white horse holding aloft a sword, described as "probably...the only armed Holy Virgin in the world." This encouraged the Christian Normans to defeat the Saracens in 1091. However, the story itself is believed to have been first promoted no earlier than the 15th century.

=== Press ===
Il Giornale di Scicli is a fortnightly newspaper whose first issue appeared on 9 October 1977. It covers current affairs, politics, culture, society, economics and sport, with particular attention to events in Scicli. Over its first forty years, it became a constant presence in the town's social and cultural life and recorded important events in the local community.

== Economy ==
The economy of Scicli is mostly agricultural, and the area is renowned for its many greenhouses producing the primizie ("early fruits") that are exported all over Italy.

== Sport ==
The local association football club is the U.P.D. Scicli; and the futsal club is the Pro Scicli, that also played in Serie A. The town plays host to an annual road running race, Memorial Peppe Greco, which traces its route through the city centre.

Proposals to build "Scicli municipal swimming pool" ended when the project's Government funding was revoked in December 2025.

== Transport ==
Scicli has a railway station on the Canicattì-Gela-Ragusa-Syracuse line. Another station serves the frazione of Sampieri.

The town will be served by the planned extension, to Ragusa and Gela, of the A18 motorway.

Scicli can also be reached by bus.

== People ==
- Giuseppe Drago (1955–2016), physician and politician, President of Sicily in 1998
- Severino Santiapichi (1926–2016), magistrate and writer

== Gallery ==
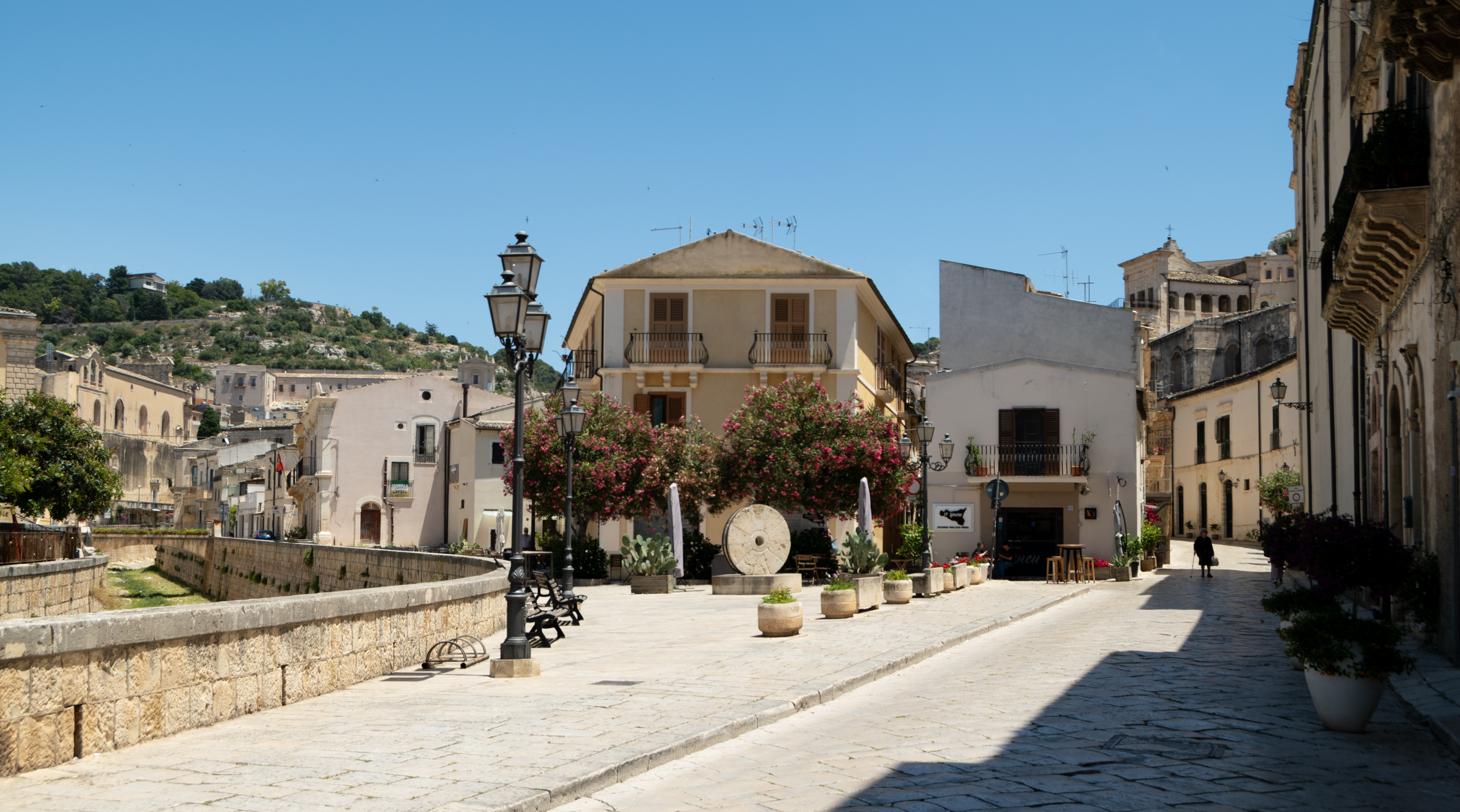
Western section of Via Francesco Mormino Penna

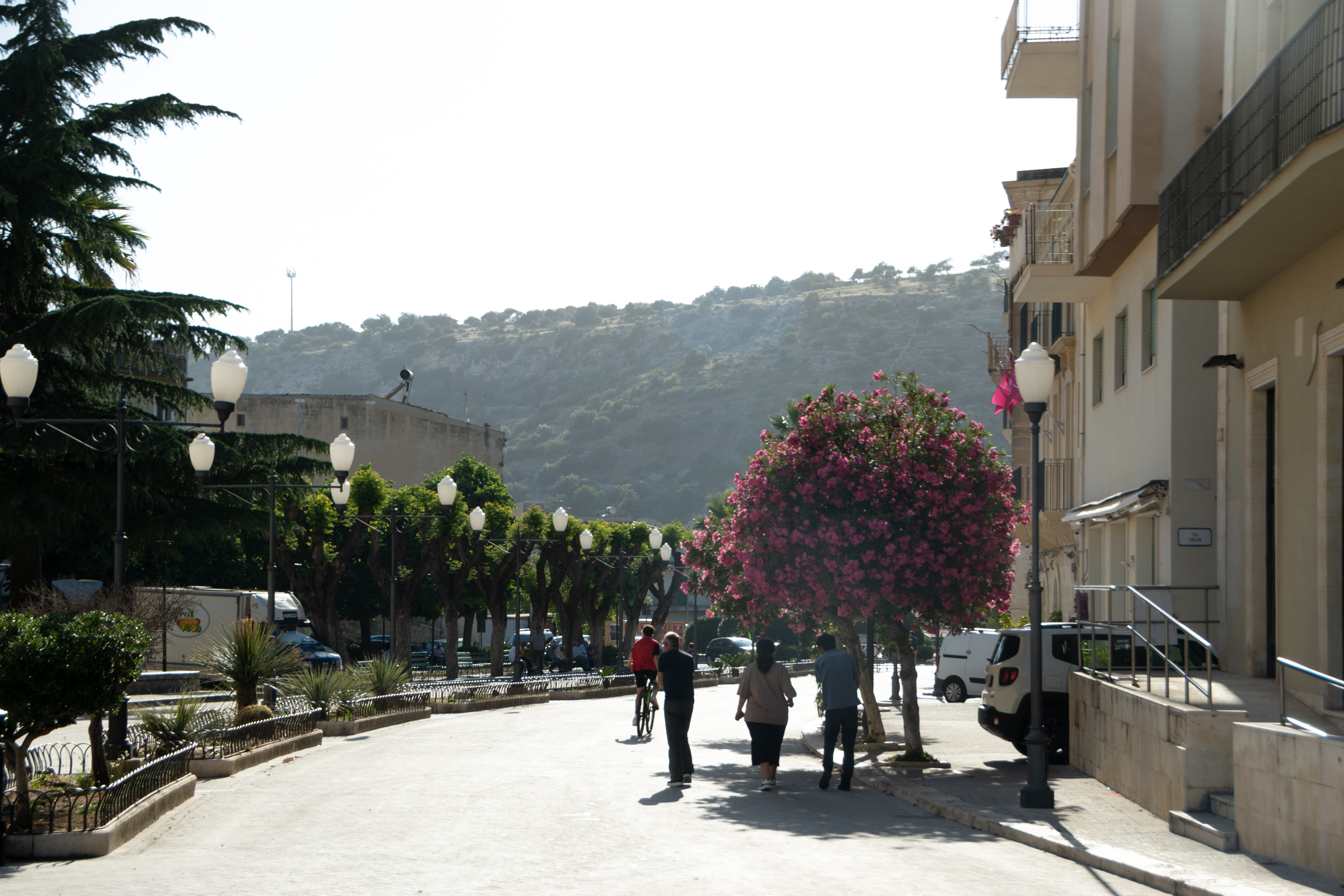
Largo Antonio Gramsci

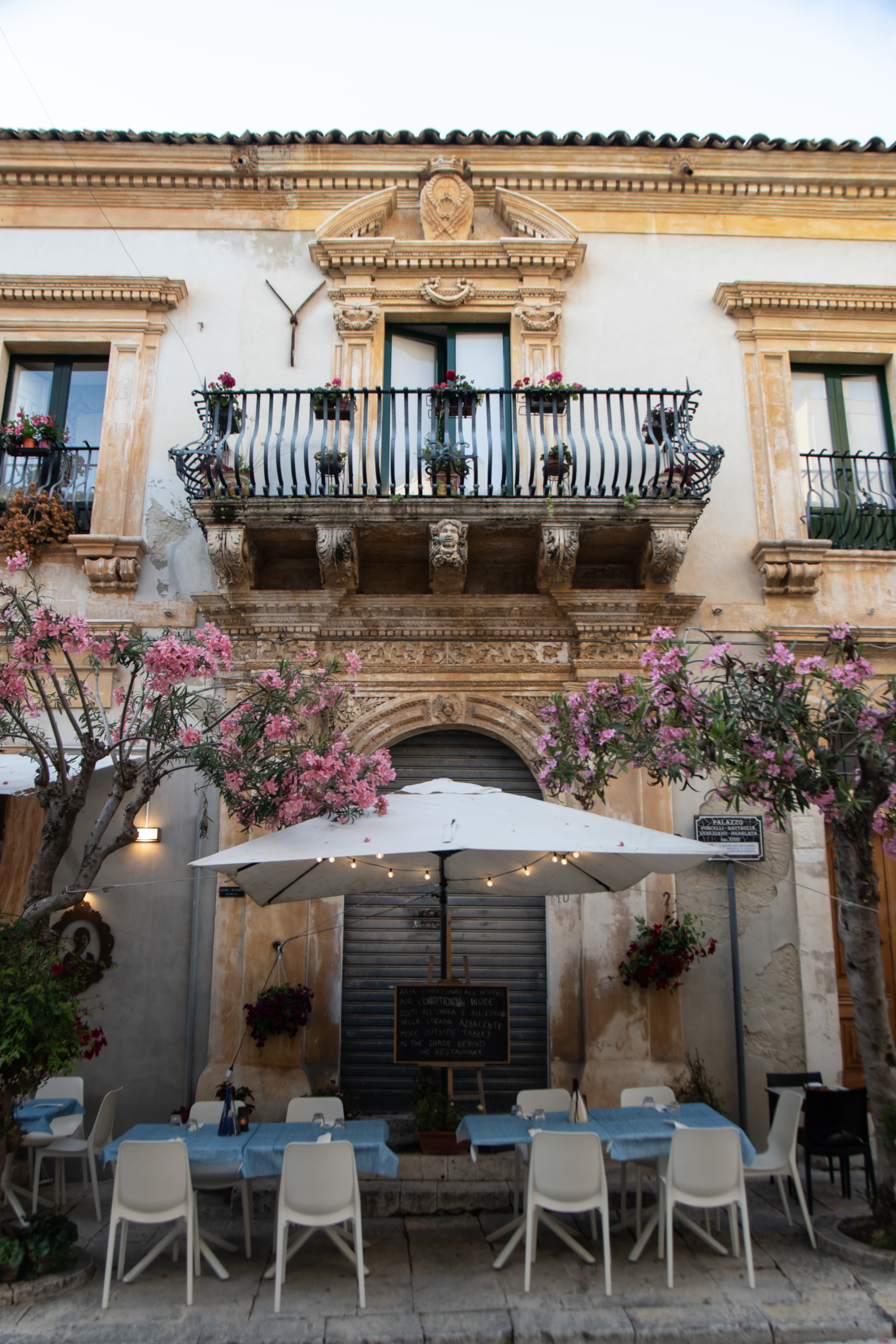
Palazzo Porcelli Battaglia Veneziano Sgarlata on Via Francesco Mormino Penna

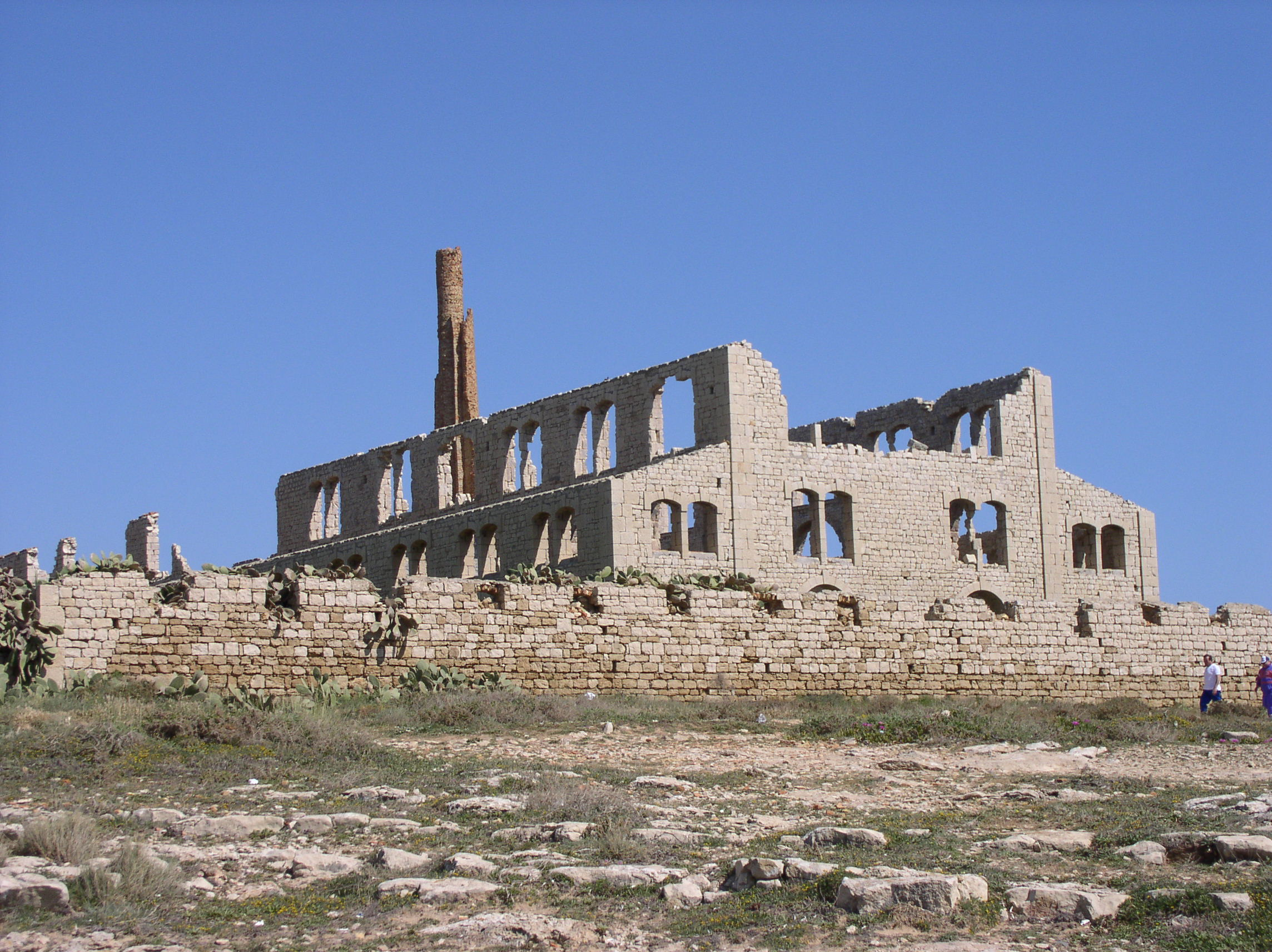
The "Fornace Penna", an industrial archaeology monument in Sampieri

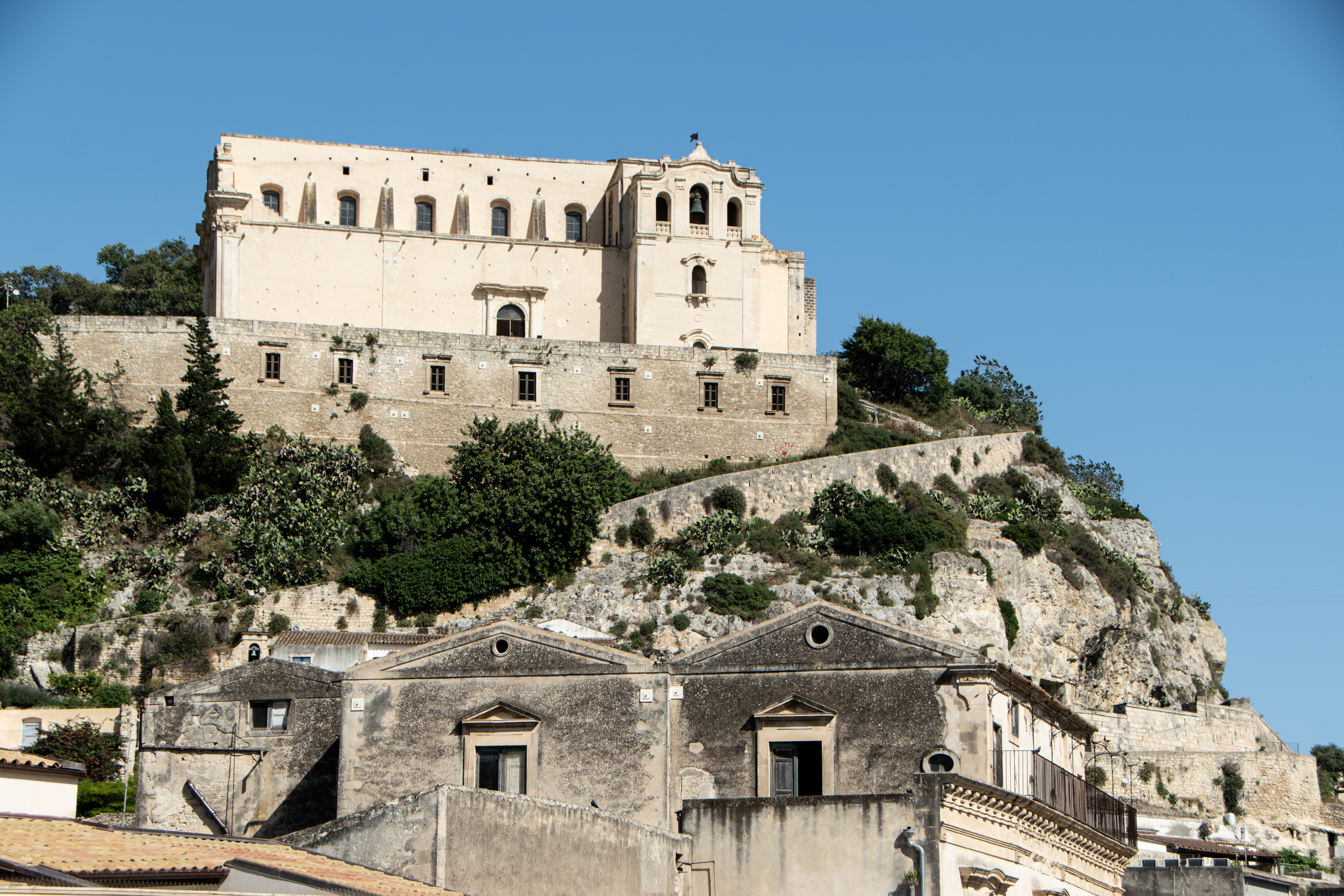
Church of San Matteo as viewed from afar

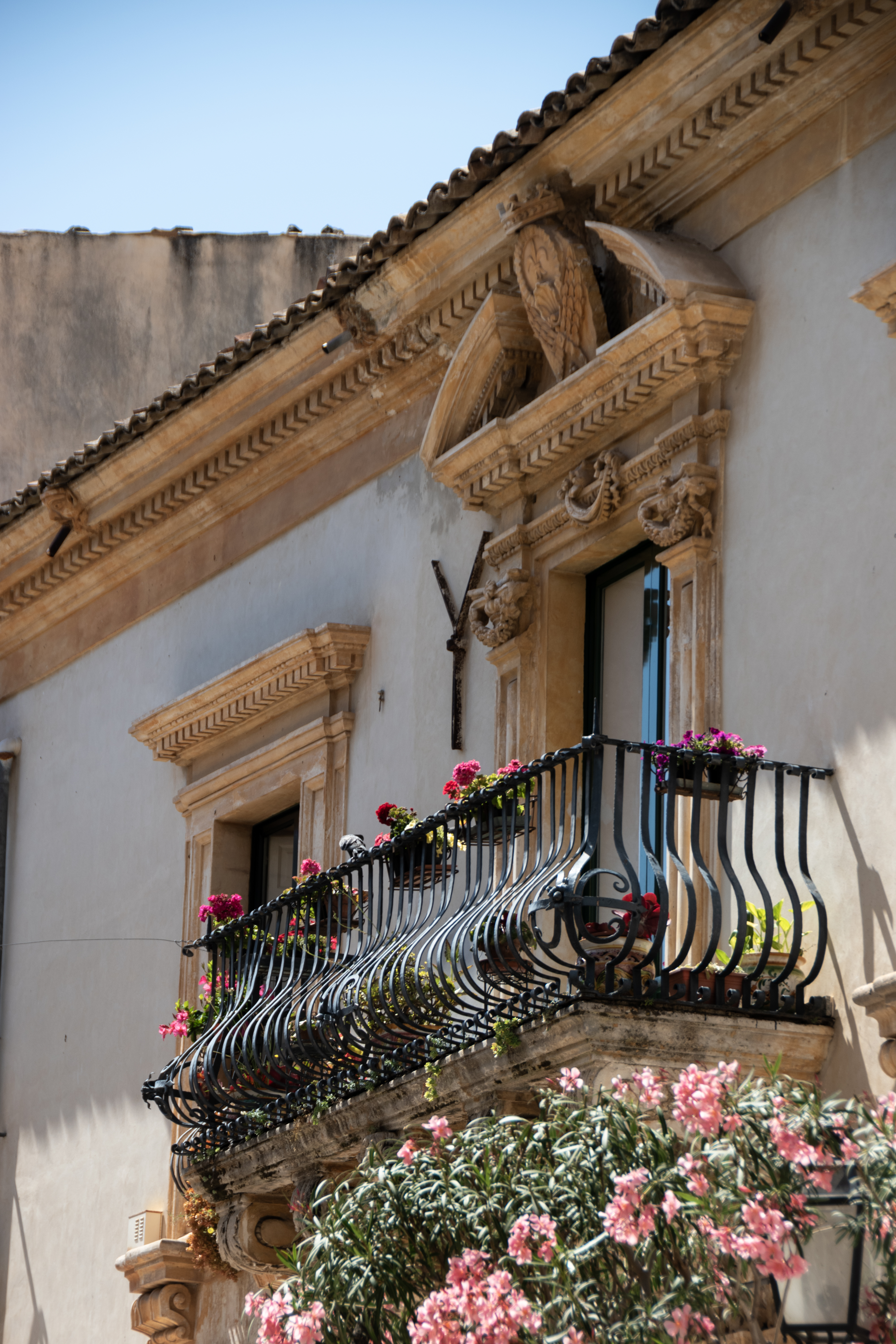
A typical baroque balcony with flowers
