= Francesco Pascucci =

Italian painter

Francesco Pascucci (1748 - after 1804) was an Italian painter, active in a neoclassical style.

== Biography ==
He was born in Rome. Few details are known of his life. He trained in Rome, and earned a living painting portraits for foreign visitors including Oswald von Mering of Cologne (1793), C.W. Schuller of Rotterdam, and the French prefect Fauchet. He spent part of his career working in France. He painted also sacred subjects including two canvases for the Livorno Cathedral, depicting the Sacrifice by Abraham, and Moses ascends Mount Sinai. In Pisa there is a canvas depicting the Capture of Troy.
