= Cava d'Aliga =

- Frazione
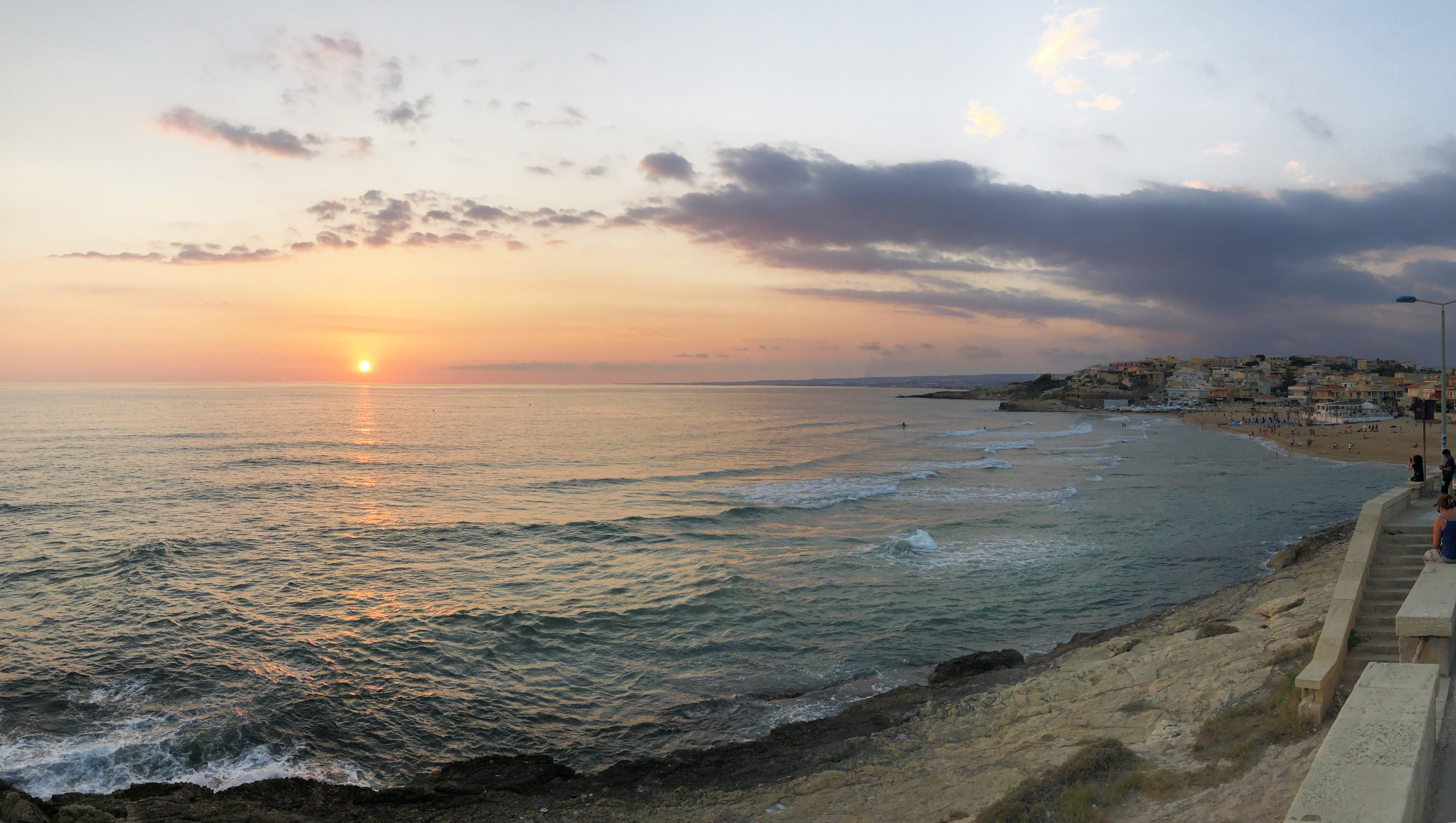
- Beach of Cava d'Aliga

- Location of Cava d'Aliga in Italy
- Coordinates: 36.7274°N 14.6918°E
- Country: Italy
- Region: Sicily
- Province: Ragusa (SR)
- Comune: Scicli
- Elevation: 35 m (115 ft)

Population
  - Total: 1,663
- Time zone: UTC+1 (CET)
  - Summer (DST): UTC+2 (CEST)
- Postal code: 97018
- Dialing code: (+39) 0932

Cava d'Aliga is a southern Italian village and marine hamlet (frazione) of Scicli, a municipality part of the Province of Ragusa, Sicily.

It has a population of 1600 circa.

== Geography ==
Cava d'Aliga is located by the Mediterranean Sea coast of the island of Sicily and is 6.71 kilometres (4.17 mi) from Scicli.
