= Arianna Occhipinti =

Italian winemaker

- Born: Sicily, Italy
- Education: University of Milan
- Occupation: winemaker
- Years active: 2009–present
- Known for: Nero d’Avola, Frappato wine
- Notable work: SP68 Rosso wine

Arianna Occhipinti (1982-) is an Italian winemaker and winery owner based in Vittoria, Italy. She is based in the Cerasuolo di Vittoria DOCG, where she grows Nero d’Avola and Frappato grapes. Occhipinti has worked in the wine industry since age 16, and has released red wine vintages under her own label starting at age 22. She is known for growing wines in the biodynamic methodology.

== Personal life and education ==
Occhipinti grew up in Sicily and became fascinated with wine in her teens. Her uncle is Giusto Occhipinti, a Sicilian winemaker of the COS estate who has been making wine since 1980. When Arianna was 16, she accompanied her uncle to VinItaly (the annual wine expo in Verona) and was very inspired by the wine culture and people.

She attended the University of Milan's school of viticulture and enology at a young age, and released her first vintage at age 22. She started growing wine in the Contrada Fossa di Lupo, and has since expanded to the Bombolieri, Pettineo and Bastonaca districts.

== Career ==
Occhipinti has farmed all of her land Biodynamically since 2009. She started with one hectare of vines, and had 10 hectares as of 2014.

Her SP68 Rosso, is a blend of two varieties native to this part of Sicily: Frappato and Nero d’Avola. The title "SP68" refers to the Strada Provinciale 68, a state route that passes by Arianna's rural property.

Occhipinti introduces very little, if any, sulfur in the wine, uses no filtration, and follows an extremely simple vinification process: wild fermentations from native airborne yeasts, 30 days maceration on skins, six months of aging in cement tanks, and a final rest in bottle before release.

Occhipinti is fluent in English, which has helped with U.S. distribution and press. She is one of the largest producers of biodynamic wine (over 120,000 bottles annually), and it was among the first to be recognized by critics as high-quality wine.
