= Francesco Aiello =

Italian politician (born 1946)

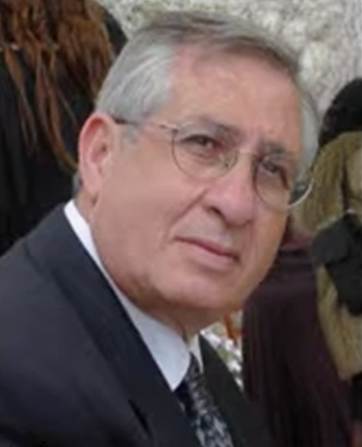
- Francesco Aiello in 2016

Mayor of Vittoria, Sicily
- Incumbent
- Assumed office 27 October 2021
- Preceded by: Filippo Dispenza (Prefectural commissioner)
- In office 27 May 2002 – 12 October 2005
- Preceded by: Himself
- Succeeded by: Salvatore Campo (Prefectural commissioner)
- In office 1 October 1997 – 27 May 2002
- Preceded by: Himself
- Succeeded by: Himself
- In office 17 May 1995 – 1 October 1997
- Preceded by: Salvatore Vernaci (Prefectural commissioner)
- Succeeded by: Himself
- In office 15 October 1988 – 23 January 1989
- Preceded by: Salvatore Garofalo
- Succeeded by: Vincenzo Cilia
- In office 9 July 1980 – 9 April 1981
- Preceded by: Himself
- Succeeded by: Rosario Iacono
- In office 16 February 1978 – 9 July 1980
- Preceded by: Giovanni Lucifora
- Succeeded by: Himself

Regional Assessor for Agriculture and Forests of Sicily
- In office 31 May 2012 – 25 October 2012
- President: Raffaele Lombardo
- In office 23 April 1993 – 21 December 1993
- President: Giuseppe Campione
- In office 16 July 1992 – 23 April 1993
- President: Giuseppe Campione

Member of the Sicilian Regional Assembly
- In office 21 May 1991 – 15 May 1995 (resigned)
- In office 20 June 1986 – 21 May 1991
- In office 21 July 1981 – 20 June 1986

Personal details
- Born: 1 August 1946 (age 80) Vittoria, Italy
- Party: PCI (1970–1991); PDS (1991–1998); DS (1998–2007); PD (2007–2008); Movement of Democratic Action / Centre-left Independent
- Profession: Politician, teacher, essayist, poet

Francesco Aiello, also known as Ciccio (born 1 August 1946), is an Italian politician, teacher, essayist and poet. He has served as mayor of Vittoria since 2021 and previously held the office during six terms between 1978 and 2005, for a total of seven mandates. He was also a member of the Sicilian Regional Assembly for three legislatures from 1981 to 1995 and served three terms as Regional Assessor for Agriculture and Forests in the Sicilian regional government.

Aiello entered local politics in 1970. His career has been the subject of profiles and interviews in Italian newspapers including L'Unità, La Repubblica, Il Foglio and AGI, published over a period of more than four decades.

Events involving Aiello that received national coverage included his response to the 1999 San Basilio massacre, after which he asked the Italian government to deploy the Italian Army, and a 2002 protest in Rome by farmers from the province of Ragusa. He has also been placed under police protection following threats connected with his public activity. In January 2026, the press reported new intimidating incidents directed at the mayor and the municipal administration of Vittoria.

== Early life, education and teaching ==
According to an autobiographical account by Aiello, his maternal grandfather was a farmer, while his father ran a fruit and vegetable shop in the San Giovanni district of Vittoria, where Aiello worked from childhood to help his family; in the same account, he said that he combined work in the shop with his studies. He later earned a degree in literature from the University of Catania and taught Italian and Latin at the classical and scientific lyceums in Vittoria.

== Political career ==
=== Early career (1970–1989) ===
As a militant of the Italian Communist Party (PCI), he was elected as a municipal councillor in Vittoria for the first time in 1970, at the age of 24. He became mayor for the first time on 16 February 1978, at the age of 31, remaining in office until 9 April 1981. He returned to serve as mayor a second time from 15 October 1988 to 23 January 1989.

During this period, the administration—led by a PCI-PSI coalition—built public works, including nursery schools, a family advisory bureau, and the rebuilding of the municipal water network. A 1980 article in L'Unità described Aiello, then nicknamed "the professor", as an administrator with a frequent, direct presence in the city's neighbourhoods.

=== Activity in the Sicilian Regional Assembly ===
Aiello was elected to the Sicilian Regional Assembly in 1981 and served for three legislatures (IX, X and XI) until 1995. The Assembly is the legislature of Sicily, an autonomous region whose special statute has constitutional rank and grants exclusive legislative competence in fields including agriculture and local government; its members are officially titled deputies.

During the XI legislature, he served twice as Regional Assessor for Agriculture and Forests in governments headed by Giuseppe Campione, from 16 July 1992 to 21 December 1993. He returned to the same office from 31 May to 25 October 2012 in the government led by Raffaele Lombardo.

During his parliamentary tenure, he presented bills on agricultural matters, including Bill No. 729/1994 on applied research in agriculture, and proposals concerning local heritage, the prickly pear and Liberty-style architecture. He also introduced Bill No. 10/1991, which proposed making Scoglitti an autonomous municipality; the bill did not complete the regional legislative process. Article 7 of Vittoria's municipal statute, approved by City Council Resolution No. 144 of 3 August 2007, later stated that the municipality supported the possible establishment of Scoglitti as a separate municipality. That provision was not retained in the version approved by City Council Resolution No. 8 of 2014, which identifies Scoglitti as a frazione of Vittoria.

In the X and XI legislatures, Aiello was the primary signatory of eight bills, 84 parliamentary questions, 45 interpellations, two motions and five orders of the day.

=== Candidacies for the Italian and European parliaments ===
In 1994, he ran unsuccessfully for the Italian Parliament. In 1999, he was a candidate, third on the list for the Italian Islands constituency, for the European Parliament for the Democrats of the Left, without being elected.

=== Return to the municipal leadership (1995–2005) ===
He resigned from his role as regional parliamentarian in 1995 and ran again for mayor of Vittoria, being elected in the first round (14 May 1995) with 18,170 votes (63.26%). He was re-elected in the first round in the 1997 elections (19,594 votes, 71.21%) and the 2002 elections (16,620 votes, 52.93%), remaining mayor until his resignation on 12 October 2005, following an internal political crisis within the council majority. The end of his mandate was followed by the appointment of Salvatore Campo as prefectural commissioner.

=== The San Basilio massacre and the request for the Army (1999) ===
On 2 January 1999, five people were killed in a bar in Vittoria in the so-called San Basilio massacre, an episode part of a conflict between rival clans over the control of economic activities tied to the Vittoria fruit and vegetable market. The massacre occurred during Aiello's mandate as mayor and was followed by demands for a stronger state presence in the Vittoria territory.

In the following days, Aiello formally requested the government to deploy the Italian Army to garrison the area, a request reported by the national press in the context of the institutional response to the massacre. At the time, Aiello was already under a police escort following numerous threats received during his mandate, as attested by journalistic reports of the period.

=== Debate on urban planning and the Palio di Vittoria (2002) ===
In 2002, journalist Carlo Ruta published the Dossier sul Palio di Vittoria, which criticised aspects of the municipality's urban-planning policies and the reintroduction that year of a local equestrian competition.

Aiello rejected the criticisms of his administration, placing them in the context of local political conflict and the wider public debate over the Mafia, anti-Mafia policy and the management of the territory of Vittoria.

=== Years in opposition and return in 2021 ===
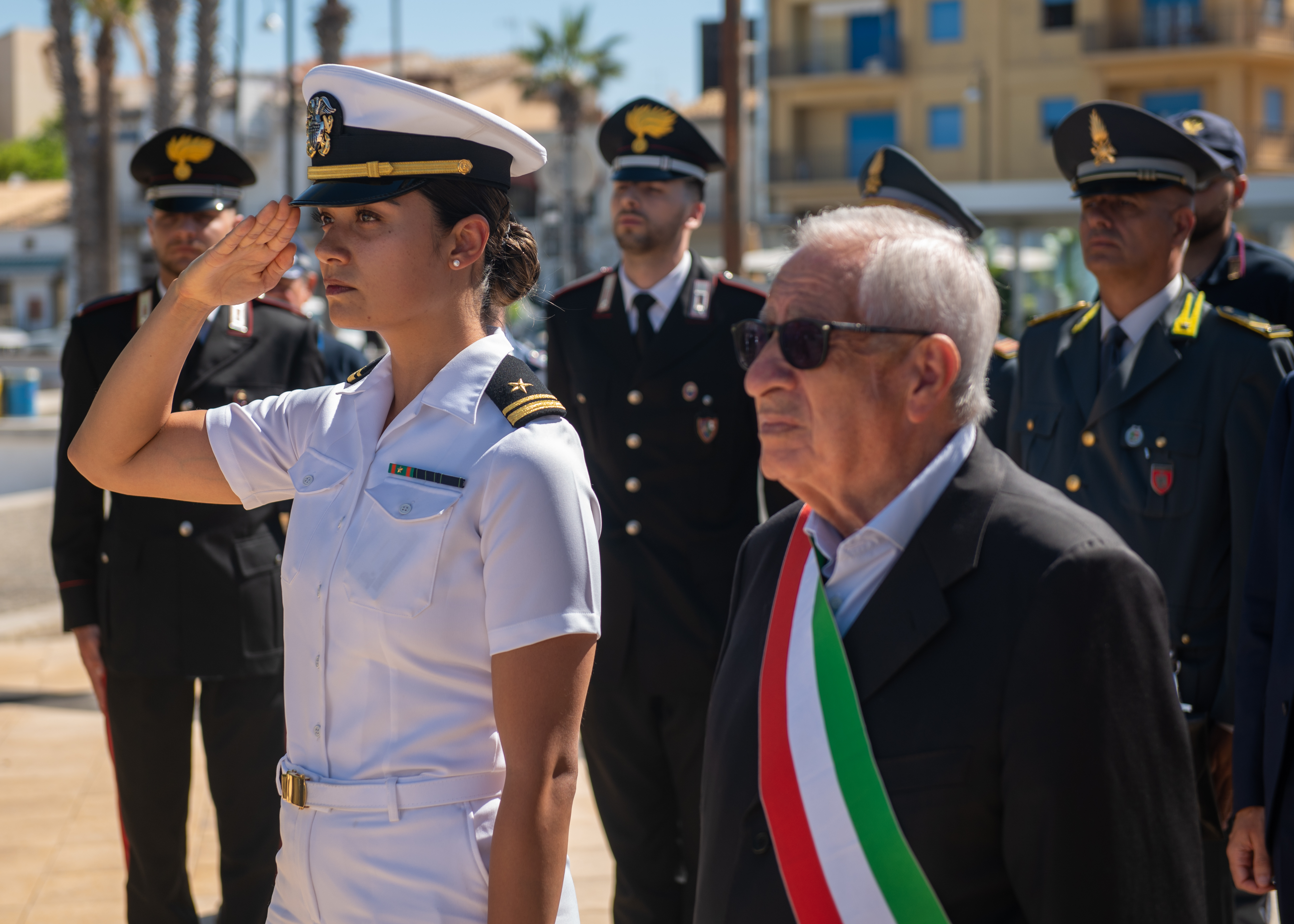
Aiello and US Navy officer Vianni Paquian at a ceremony commemorating Operation Husky in Scoglitti in 2025.

After resigning as mayor in 2005, Aiello was elected municipal councillor in 2006 on the Democrats of the Left list. In 2008, he left the Democratic Party following a dispute with its local leadership and founded the Movement of Democratic Action, with which he sat in opposition on the city council.

In the 2011 local election, he again ran for mayor with the support of Raffaele Lombardo's Movement for the Autonomies. The alliance caused tensions within the local centre-left, as the Democratic Party nominated Giuseppe Nicosia, a former deputy mayor in an Aiello administration. The campaign included mutual accusations: Aiello alleged links between organised crime and the municipal waste-collection service, while Nicosia raised allegations concerning the management of Aiello's electoral list. Aiello placed third in the first round with 20.99% of the vote.

In the 2016 local election, Aiello reached the runoff but was defeated by Giovanni Moscato, a candidate supported by centre-right civic lists; Aiello received 44.84% of the vote. Vittoria's municipal council was dissolved in 2018 following an administrative decision based on findings of organised-crime infiltration, and the municipality remained under extraordinary administration led by prefectural commissioner Filippo Dispenza until the 2021 elections. In 2024, Moscato and the other former administrators charged in related criminal proceedings were acquitted because the alleged act had not occurred.

At the 2021 local election, Aiello ran with the civic list Aiello Sindaco, supported by the Democratic Party, the Italian Socialist Party and the Cento Passi per la Sicilia list. He was elected in the runoff with 14,261 votes (56.02%), defeating the centre-right candidate Salvo Sallemi, who received 43.98%. In April 2026, he said that he was likely to seek another term.

=== Electoral history ===
Term	Start	End	Party	Electoral result
I	16 February 1978	9 July 1980	Italian Communist Party	Elected by the Municipal Council
II	9 July 1980	9 April 1981	Italian Communist Party	Confirmed by the Municipal Council
III	15 October 1988	23 January 1989	Italian Communist Party	Elected by the Municipal Council
IV	17 May 1995	1 October 1997	Democratic Party of the Left	Elected in the first round with 18,170 votes (63.26%)
V	1 October 1997	27 May 2002	Democratic Party of the Left	Elected in the first round with 19,594 votes (71.21%)
VI	27 May 2002	12 October 2005 (resigned)	Democrats of the Left	Elected in the first round with 16,620 votes (52.93%)
VII	27 October 2021	Present	Centre-left independent	Elected in the runoff with 14,261 votes (56.02%)

== Political affiliations and views ==
Aiello began his political career in the Italian Communist Party. A 1980 profile in L'Unità described him as the "professor mayor", while later profiles in La Repubblica and Il Foglio referred to him respectively as a capopopolo and "the last communist".

In a 2025 interview, Aiello linked his political formation to a 1979 meeting in Vittoria with PCI leader Enrico Berlinguer. According to Aiello, Berlinguer focused on municipal social services rather than internal party factions, and the meeting was followed by Aiello's first candidacy for the Sicilian Regional Assembly.

Aiello remained in the PCI's successor parties until 2008, when he left the Democratic Party after a dispute with its local leadership. He accused the party of abandoning its traditional representation of workers and farmers and subsequently founded the Movement of Democratic Action. In 2011, he formed an electoral alliance with Raffaele Lombardo's Movement for the Autonomies and ran against the official Democratic Party candidate in Vittoria. The following year, Lombardo appointed him Regional Assessor for Agriculture and Forests.

In the same 2025 interview, Aiello criticised what he regarded as the media-driven language of the contemporary Italian left. He also expressed reservations about the leadership of Elly Schlein and about the technical complexity of the questions in the 2025 referendums promoted by the CGIL.

== Administrative activity for agriculture and the territory ==
=== Farmers' protest in Rome (2002) ===
In January 2002, Aiello led a protest by farmers from the Ragusa area in Rome, driving trucks loaded with agricultural produce against the policies of the Ministry of Agriculture, then led by Gianni Alemanno. During the protest, Aiello also criticised certain television programmes hosted by Bruno Vespa and Maurizio Costanzo, claiming they contributed to an unfavourable portrayal of fresh agricultural products compared to preserved ones. The event was covered by the national press and helped bring visibility to the confrontation between Sicilian administrators, local farmers, and the national government over agricultural policies.

=== Promotion of Cerasuolo di Vittoria ===
During Aiello's mayoral terms between 1995 and 2005, the municipal administration promoted the local wine sector through initiatives including a municipal viticultural plan prepared by oenologist Mario Fregoni and support for the creation of a protection consortium. Cerasuolo di Vittoria received DOCG status in 2005.

During a later term, the administration granted Fregoni honorary citizenship during events marking the fiftieth anniversary of the wine's DOC recognition and co-financed the Parco del Cerasuolo di Vittoria project.

=== Water crisis and dispute with Siciliacque ===
The condition of Vittoria's water-supply infrastructure was a major issue during the term that began in 2021. In 2025, centre-right opposition parties criticised the municipal administration over service disruptions and the absence of desalination plants that had previously been proposed. The administration attributed part of the disruption to the regional water company Siciliacque S.p.A.; in July 2025, Aiello and the company announced an agreement on emergency measures.

The municipality and Siciliacque were also involved in litigation over invoices from 2014 and 2015. In January 2026, the Catania Court of Appeal ordered Vittoria to pay the company more than €650,000, overturning the first-instance ruling on the tariff applicable to an emergency water-supply service.

== Defamation conviction ==
In June 2026, the Court of Ragusa imposed a fine on Aiello after finding him guilty of defaming Giuseppe Zarba, a former president of the association of commission agents at Vittoria's fruit and vegetable market, in relation to statements made in May 2024. The public prosecutor had requested an acquittal on the ground that the statements fell within the right of political criticism. Aiello's lawyer, Giuseppe Russotto, said that he would consider an appeal.

== Literary works ==
Aiello is the author of an autobiographical essay, La città difficile (The Difficult City, 2016), on the political and criminal dynamics faced by Sicilian administrators, as well as several poetry collections.

- Di questi emigrati (1965) - short poem
- Foglie di sale (1995) - poetry
- Lettere e Idilli (2005) - poetry
- La città difficile (2016) - essay
- Il segno e la memoria (2024) - poetry
