= Scoglitti =

Scoglitti Scugghitti (Sicilian)
- Frazione
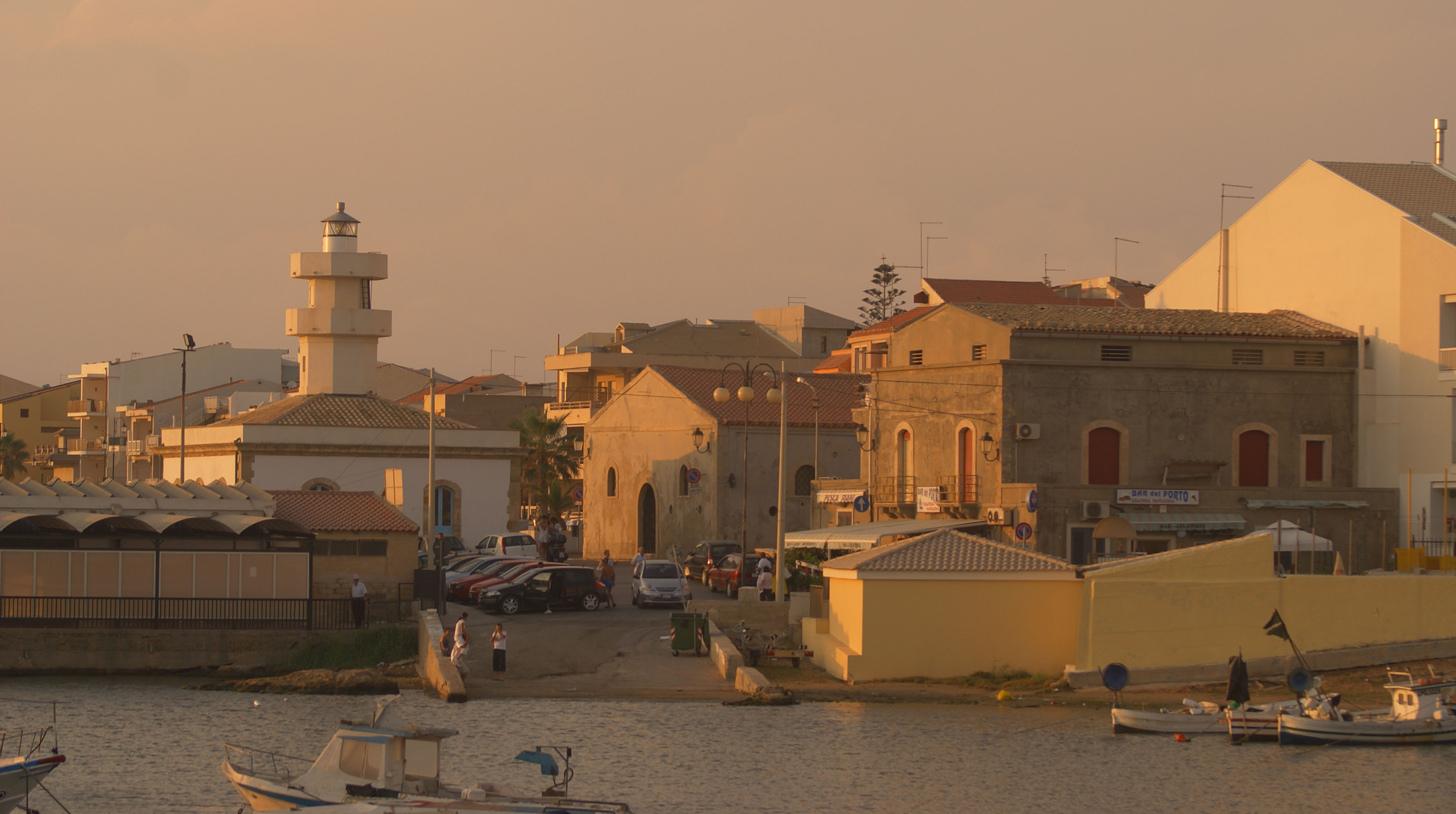
- Sunset in Scoglitti

- Location of Scoglitti in Italy
- Coordinates: 36°53′00″N 14°26′00″E
- Country: Italy
- Region: Sicily
- Province: Ragusa (RG)
- Comune: Vittoria
- Elevation: 20 m (66 ft)

Population (2011)
  - Total: 4,175
- Demonym: Scoglittesi
- Time zone: UTC+1 (CET)
  - Summer (DST): UTC+2 (CEST)
- Postal code: 97019
- Dialing code: (+39) 0932

Scoglitti (Sicilian: Scugghitti) is a fishing village and hamlet (frazione) of Vittoria, a municipality in the Province of Ragusa, Sicily, Italy. In 2011 it had a population of 4,175.

== History ==
Scoglitti found a niche in history after being selected by the Allies as the site for an amphibious invasion of Sicily made by the US 45th Infantry Division during World War II.

When the invasion went ahead on July 10, 1943, rough seas disorganized the attacking boat waves, and the soft sand was an impediment to movement. However, the location was poorly defended and the Allies were able to consolidate their position in a day or two and move further inland.

=== Administrative status ===
The question of Scoglitti's administrative autonomy has periodically been raised in local and regional politics. In 1991, Sicilian Regional Assembly deputy and former mayor of Vittoria Francesco Aiello introduced Bill No. 10, which proposed the establishment of Scoglitti as an autonomous comune. The bill did not complete the regional legislative process.

The municipal statute approved by the Vittoria city council through Resolution No. 144 of 3 August 2007 subsequently stated that the municipality supported the possibility of Scoglitti becoming a separate municipality.

A later version of the municipal statute, approved through Resolution No. 8 of 2014, no longer included that provision. It identified Scoglitti as a frazione of Vittoria and provided for the establishment of a decentralized administrative district named Scoglitti, with responsibilities relating to demographic, social, educational, cultural and recreational services.

== Geography ==
Scoglitti is a seaside village by the Mediterranean Coast. It is 14 km from Vittoria and Santa Croce Camerina, 20 from Marina di Ragusa, 22 from Comiso, 30 from Gela and 30 from Ragusa.

== Economy ==
In addition to its fishing industry, the village derives a substantial part of its income from tourism.

== Events ==
The village hosts a daily fishing auction, and annual events such as the Festival of St Francesco, and the procession of the Virgine di Portosalvo.

- Local craft beer festival

== See also ==
- Cerasuolo di Vittoria (wine)
