= Cristina Scuccia =

Italian singer (born 1988)

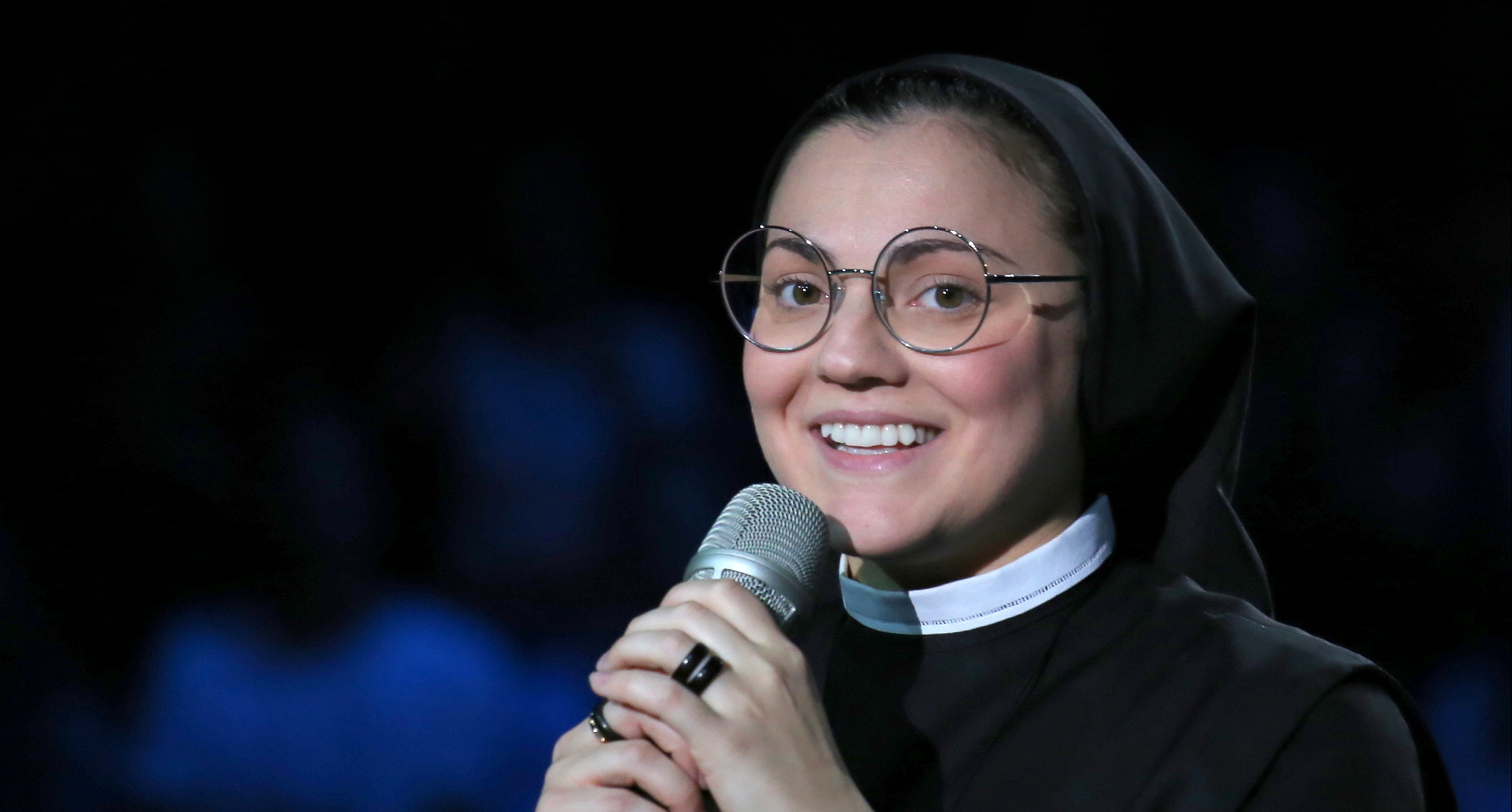

Background information
- Born: Cristina Scuccia; 19 August 1988 (age 38)
- Origin: Vittoria, Italy
- Genres: Pop, rock, soul
- Occupation: Singer,
- Years active: 2007–present
- Label: Universal Music Italia

Cristina Scuccia (born 19 August 1988) is an Italian singer and former Catholic religious sister. She won the 2014 season of The Voice of Italy as part of Team J-Ax, resulting in a record deal with Universal. In 2013, she won a Christian music competition as part of the Good News Festival.

== Early life ==
Cristina Scuccia was born in Vittoria in 1988. She became a novice in 2009 and worked for two years with poor children in Brazil before formally joining the Ursuline order. In the years from 2009 to 2011, Sister Cristina improved her artistic skills at the "Star Rose Academy" in Rome, created and directed by Maximo De Marco. Her singing teacher was the singer-songwriter Franco Simone. Her television debut was in June 2012, on the program "Dizionario dei sentimenti" by Franco Simone, on Gold Tv in Rome.

== Career ==
=== 2014–present ===
==== The Voice of Italy ====
In 2014, Scuccia applied to The Voice of Italy singing competition, singing for her audition "No One" by Alicia Keys. The performance received more than 104 million views on YouTube. She was very popular with the audience and all four judges—Raffaella Carrà, J-Ax, Noemi, and Piero Pelù—turned their chairs in the blind audition. Cristina chose to be part of Team J-Ax. Throughout the contest, she wore a simple crucifix around her neck, black shoes and ankle-length black religious habit. In the final, she won the trophy with 62% of the Italian votes against runner-up Giacomo Voli. After winning, she thanked God and recited the Lord's Prayer to the show organizers and audience.

Performances

- Blind audition (19 March 2014): "No One" by Alicia Keys. All four chairs turned.
- Battle round (16 April 2014): "Girls Just Want to Have Fun" by Cyndi Lauper. Advanced against Luna Palumbo of Team J-Ax.
- Knock out round (24 April 2014): "Hero" by Mariah Carey. Advanced against Benedetta Giovagnini of Team J-Ax.
- Live show 1 (7 May 2014): "Flashdance... What a Feeling" by Irene Cara. Saved by public vote.
- Live show 2 (14 May 2014): "Uno su mille" by Gianni Morandi. Saved by public vote.
- Live show 3 (21 May 2014): "Livin' on a Prayer" by Bon Jovi. Saved by public vote.
- Semi-final (28 May 2014): "(I've Had) The Time of My Life" by Bill Medley and Jennifer Warnes. 45/100 from coach and 70.18/100 from voting public. Advanced to final. Dylan Magon from Team J-Ax eliminated.
- Final (5 June 2014) singing:
  - Phase one (Final 4):
    - "Beautiful That Way" by Achinoam Nini.
    - "Gli anni" by 883 in duet with coach J-Ax.
    - "Lungo la riva" (new song). Advanced with Giacomo Voli and Tommaso Pini. Giorgia Pino eliminated.
  - Phase 2 (Final 3):
    - "No One" by Alicia Keys. Advanced to Final 2 with Giacomo Voli. Tommaso Pini eliminated.
  - Phase 3 (Final 2)
    - "Flashdance... What a Feeling" from Irene Cara. Won The Voice title with 62.30% of the vote. Finalist Giacomo Voli runner up for season.

=== Album and video ===
On 20 October 2014, the music video for Scuccia's version of Madonna's "Like a Virgin" was released on Vevo platform. It is the lead single from her debut album Sister Cristina which was released on 11 November 2014. The album contains her interpretations of a number of songs as well as two previously unreleased songs.

On 18 December 2014, she released her second music video "Blessed Be Your Name".

=== Acting career ===
In 2015, Scuccia was cast as Sister Mary Robert in the Italian production of the Sister Act musical.

== Personal life ==
On 20 November 2022, she was a guest on the Italian program Verissimo by Silvia Toffanin, in which she announced that she had given up her perpetual vows to be able to devote herself full-time to a musical career.

== Discography ==
=== Albums ===
Year	Album	Peak positions			Track listing
Year	Album	IT	BEL (Wa)	FR	Track listing
2014	Sister Cristina: 1st studio album; Released: 10 November 2014	17	133	46	1. "Try" (3:35); 2. "Fallin' Free" (3:32); 3. "Like a Virgin" (4:00); 4. "Somewhere Only We Know" (3:35); 5. "Blessed Be Your Name" (3:48); 6. "Fix You" (4:30); 7. "No One" (3:55); 8. "I Surrender" (3:53); 9. "True Colors" (3:59); 10. "Price Tag" (3:32); 11. "Perto, longe ou depois [Ordinary World]" (4:08); 12. "L'amore vincerà" (3:34)

=== Singles ===
Year	Title	Chart positions	
Year	Title	IT	FR
2014	"Like a Virgin"	–	185
2014	"Blessed Be Your Name"	–	–
2016	"Hallelujah"	–	–
2018	"Felice"	–	–
2023	"La felicità è una direzione"	–	–

Awards and achievements
Preceded by Elhaida Dani	The Voice of Italy winner 2014	Succeeded by Fabio Curto
