= Federico Russo (presenter) =

Italian television presenter and writer

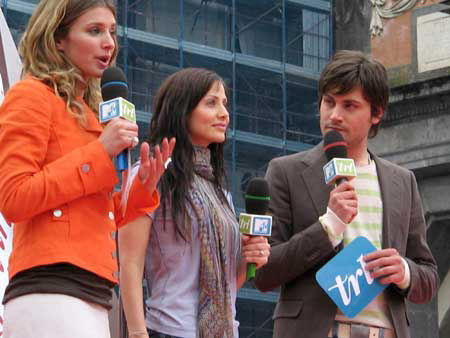
- Russo (right) in 2005
- Born: 22 December 1980 (age 44); Florence, Italy
- Career
- Show: The Voice of Italy (2014–2016); Eurovision Song Contest (2015–2020)
- Station: RAI

Federico Russo (born 22 December 1980) is an Italian radio and television presenter. He is known for presenting The Voice of Italy on Rai 2 (seasons 2 to 4), and for being the main Italian commentator of the Eurovision Song Contest between 2015 and 2019 contests as well as Eurovision: Europe Shine a Light show in 2020.

He also was the spokesperson for Italy in the Eurovision Song Contest 2015, where he announced that Italy had given the twelve points to Sweden's Måns Zelmerlöw and his winning song "Heroes".
