= Vittoria, Sicily =

Vittoria
- Comune
- Città di Vittoria
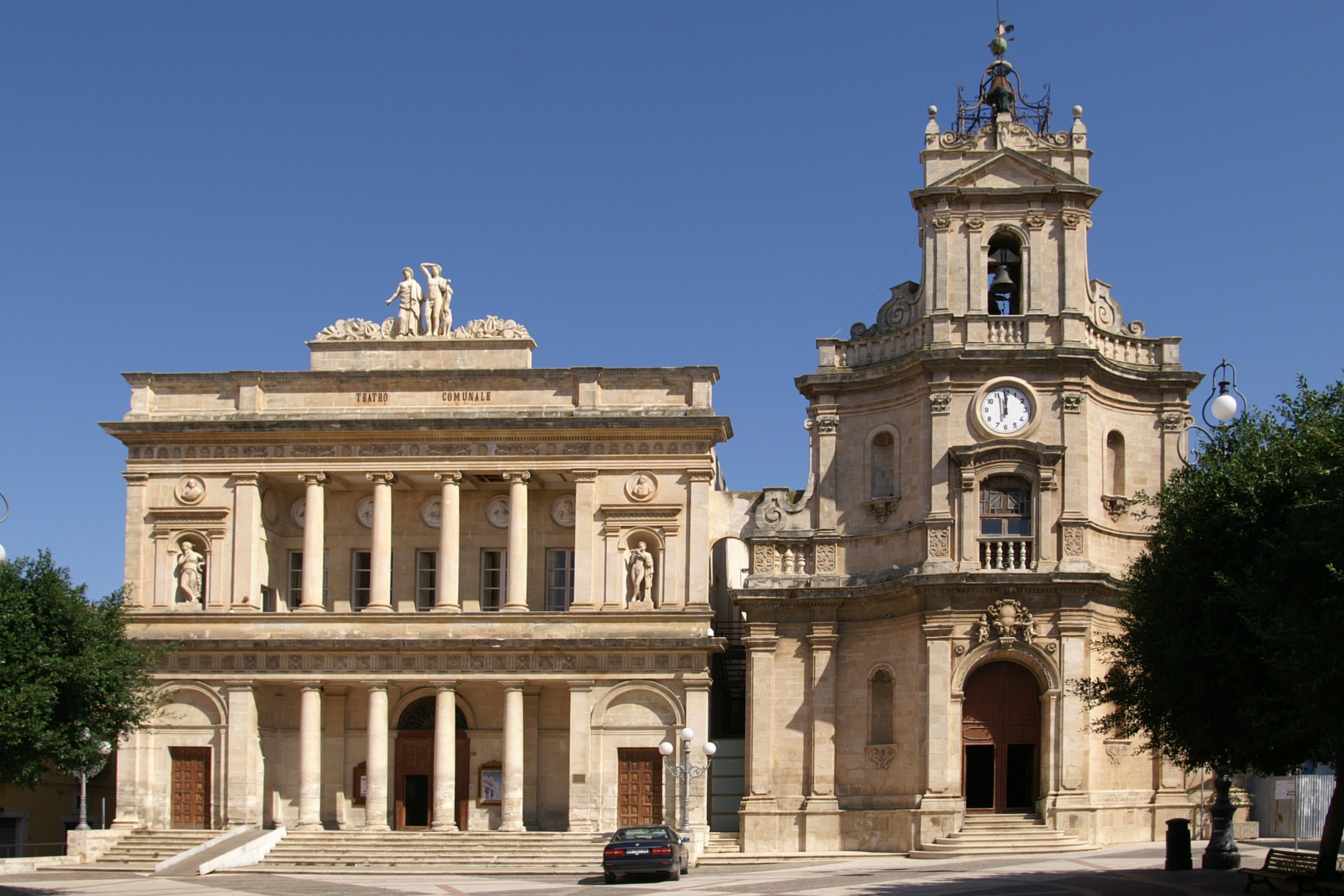
- Church of the Graces

- Coat of arms

- Vittoria within the Province of Ragusa

- Location within Italy Location within Sicily
- Coordinates: 36°57′N 14°32′E
- Country: Italy
- Region: Sicily
- Province: Ragusa (RG)
- Frazioni: Scoglitti

Government
  - Mayor: Francesco Aiello

Area
  - Total: 182.48 km^{2} (70.46 sq mi)
- Elevation: 168 m (551 ft)

Population (2025)
  - Total: 65,714
  - Density: 360.12/km^{2} (932.70/sq mi)
- Demonym: Vittoriesi
- Time zone: UTC+1 (CET)
  - Summer (DST): UTC+2 (CEST)
- Postal code: 97019
- Dialing code: 0932
- Patron saint: St. John the Baptist
- Saint day: First Sunday of July
- Website: Official website

Vittoria (Italian pronunciation: [vitˈtɔːrja]) is a city and comune (municipality) in the province of Ragusa in the autonomous island region of Sicily in southern Italy. As of 2025, with a population of 65,714, Vittoria is the 8th-largest city in Sicily and the 89th-largest in Italy.

== History ==
Vittoria is the youngest town in the province and it presents a modern checkerboard structure, with wide and straight streets. The town's womenfolk are known to still do intricate embroideries, first adopted during the period of Arab rule in Sicily.

== Geography ==
The town was founded on a very fertile valley known as "Boscopiano". On the south of the city there is the "natural reserve of Aleppo pines" (Riserva naturale del Pino d'Aleppo). The coastlines along the sea are low and sandy with rare rocks. The highest point, though poorly mountainous, is Mount Calvo (250 meters). Vittoria is located between the municipalities of Acate and Ragusa, while the hillside is bordered by the towns of Comiso and Chiaramonte Gulfi. It is located 27 km from Ragusa and Gela, 108 km from Siracusa and 131 km from Catania. Vittoria has an altitude of 168 meters s.l.m. and an area of 181.31 km^{2}. Its only hamlet (frazione) is the seaside locality of Scoglitti. However, in addition to the urban area, it has 45 different contrade.

=== Climate ===
The climate is typically Mediterranean, though slightly higher temperatures are usually recorded when compared to other municipalities in the area, due to the fact the city sits at a lower elevation. The coldest month of the year is January and the hottest July and August.

== Demographics ==
As of 2025, Vittoria has a population of 65,714, of whom 51.7% are male and 48.3% are female, compared to the nationwide average of 49.0% and 51.0% respectively. Minors make up 18.4% of the population, and seniors make up 18.5%, compared to the Italian average of 14.9% and 24.7% respectively.

Historical population

Year	Pop.	±%
1861	15,882	—
1871	17,461	+9.9%
1881	23,773	+36.1%
1901	32,214	+35.5%
1911	31,889	−1.0%
1921	32,837	+3.0%
1931	38,802	+18.2%
1936	37,569	−3.2%

Year	Pop.	±%
1951	43,239	+15.1%
1961	45,035	+4.2%
1971	46,130	+2.4%
1981	51,240	+11.1%
1991	55,280	+7.9%
2001	55,317	+0.1%
2011	61,006	+10.3%
2021	62,533	+2.5%

Source: ISTAT

=== Immigration ===
As of 2025, the foreign-born population is 10,103, equal to 15.5% of the population. The 5 largest foreign nationalities are Tunisians (3,819), Romanians (2,378), Albanians (1,363), Bangladeshis (533) and Moroccans (502).

== Economy ==
Vittoria is an important area in south-eastern Sicily, between the Hyblean plateau and the sea famous for cultivating Nero d’Avola and Frappato - two types of wine grapes destined for very important wines such as Cerasuolo di Vittoria DOCG. The city of Vittoria is home to the largest fruit and vegetable markets in Italy, and is the most important in Europe for tomatoes.

== Twin towns — sister cities ==
Vittoria is twinned with:

- Mátészalka, Hungary
- Siġġiewi, Malta

== Notable people ==
- Mario Russotto (born 1957), Roman Catholic prelate and bishop of Caltanissetta since 2003
- Danilo Napolitano (born 1981), racing cyclist
- Luca Marin (born 1986), swimmer
- Cristina Scuccia (born 1988), former nun and singer
- Francesco Cafiso (born 1989), jazz musician
- Francesco Aiello (born 1946), politician and seven-time mayor of Vittoria over a 48-year span
- Salvo Sallemi (born 1977), politician and senator of the Italian Republic

== See also ==
- Scoglitti
- Monti Iblei Cup (Hill Climb)
- Cerasuolo di Vittoria (wine)
- Capuliato (Condiment)
- F.C. Vittoria
- A.C.D. Città di Vittoria
