= The Voice of Italy =

Reality singing competition TV show

- Created by: John de Mol Jr.
- Presented by: Fabio Troiano; Federico Russo; Costantino della Gherardesca; Simona Ventura; Backstage; Carolina Di Domenico; Valentina Correani; Alessandra Angeli
- Judges: Piero Pelù; Raffaella Carrà; Riccardo Cocciante; Noemi; J-Ax; Roby Facchinetti; Francesco Facchinetti; Emis Killa; Max Pezzali; Dolcenera; Francesco Renga; Cristina Scabbia; Al Bano; Morgan; Elettra Lamborghini; Guè; Gigi D'Alessio
- Country of origin: Italy
- Original language: Italian
- No. of seasons: 6
- No. of episodes: 71

Production
- Producer: Toro Produzioni

Original release
- Network: Rai 2 HD; Rai Premium (reruns); Rai 1
- Release: March 7, 2013 – June 4, 2019

Related
- The Voice Senior; The Voice Kids; The Voice Generations; The Voice (franchise)

The Voice of Italy is a reality singing competition and Italian version of the international syndication The Voice based on the reality singing competition launched in the Netherlands, created by Dutch television producer John de Mol Jr. The inaugural season was in 2013 with the first episode airing on Rai 2 on March 7, 2013, the series ended on June 7, 2019, after 6 seasons. The show was also broadcast via radio on Radio Rai and RTL 102.5. In the summer of 2020, Rai 1 announced a new version of the show, the format of The Voice Senior on air in autumn with Antonella Clerici as TV host.

It was hosted by the TV actor Fabio Troiano and the four judges were Raffaella Carrà, Noemi, Piero Pelù and Riccardo Cocciante. The winner of the series was Elhaida Dani from Team Cocciante. The program was renewed for a second season with the first episode broadcast on 12 March 2014 with Federico Russo hosting the show. Three of the judges returned; Carrà, Pelù and Noemi, however Riccardo Cocciante was replaced by J-Ax.

Sister Cristina Scuccia triumphed in the 2014 final for Team J-Ax. The nun, Suor Cristina Scuccia, recited the prayer 'Our Father' on stage after winning. On the third season, Raffaella Carrà was replaced by Roby and Francesco Facchinetti as judge, while Fabio Curto was the winner. From that competition, it remained in the overall impression and reaction of the judges - an outstanding performance of Janis Joplin's "Kozmic blues" famous song - by Gianna Chilla.

In March 2020, Rai 2 announced that they had no plans for a seventh season. In July 2020, Rai 1 announced the senior version of the show, participation is only open for candidates of more than 60 years old, which caused rumours that The Voice of Italy was cancelled to make way for The Voice Senior.

== Format ==
One of the important premises of the show is the quality of the singing talent. Four coaches, themselves popular performing artists, train the talents in their group and occasionally perform with them. Talents are selected in blind auditions, where the coaches cannot see, but only hear the auditioner.

The series consists of three phases: a blind audition, a battle phase and live performance shows. Four judges/coaches, all noteworthy recording artists, choose teams of contestants through a blind audition process. Each judge has the length of the auditioner's performance (about one minute) to decide if he or she wants that singer on his or her team; if two or more judges want the same singer (as happens frequently), the singer has the final choice of coach.

Each team of singers is mentored and developed by its respective coach. In the second stage, called the battle phase, coaches have two of their team members battle against each other directly by singing the same song together, with the coach choosing which team member to advance from each of four individual "battles" into the first live round. Within that first live round, the surviving acts from each team again compete head-to-head, with a combination of public and jury vote deciding who advances onto the next round. In the final phase, the remaining contestants (top 8) compete against each other in live broadcasts. The television audience and the coaches have equal say 50/50 in deciding who moves on to the final 4 phase. With one team member remaining for each coach, the (final 4) contestants compete against each other in the final with the outcome decided solely by the public vote.

== Coaches and hosts ==
=== Coaches ===
The four positions in the coaching panel is covered by four singers who are part of the Italian music scene. The original panel consisted of Litfiba singer Piero Pelù, Italian music icons Raffaella Carrà and Riccardo Cocciante and former The X Factor contestant Noemi. After winning as coach in the first season, Cocciante left the show and in the second season and was replaced by rapper J-Ax, former singer of Articolo 31, who was also triumphant at the end of the season with his winner, Cristina Scuccia. In the third season, Raffaella Carrà left the program and her position was filled by the father-and-son duo Roby and Francesco Facchinetti, the first-ever duo coach on the show. The fourth season saw the return of Carrà and the arrival of three new coaches: rapper Emis Killa, former 883 singer Max Pezzali and singer-songwriter Dolcenera. At the end of the fourth season, Carrà announced that she was leaving the program forever. None of the season four coaches returned for the next season. In November 2017, Al Bano announced his retirement as well as his new role as a coach on the fifth season. Francesco Renga and Cristina Scabbia were also confirmed as coaches for season five, along with returning coach J-Ax. The sixth season in 2019 again saw the total renewal of the panel, with new coaches Elettra Lamborghini, Gigi D'Alessio, Gué Pequeno and Morgan, who was previously a judge on The X Factor.

Coaches	Seasons					
Coaches	1	2	3	4	5	6
Noemi						
Piero Pelù						
Raffaella Carrà						
Riccardo Cocciante						
J-Ax						
Roby and Francesco Facchinetti						
Dolcenera						
Emis Killa						
Max Pezzali						
Al Bano						
Cristina Scabbia						
Francesco Renga						
Elettra Lamborghini						
Gigi D'Alessio						
Gué Pequeno						
Morgan						

Coaches gallery

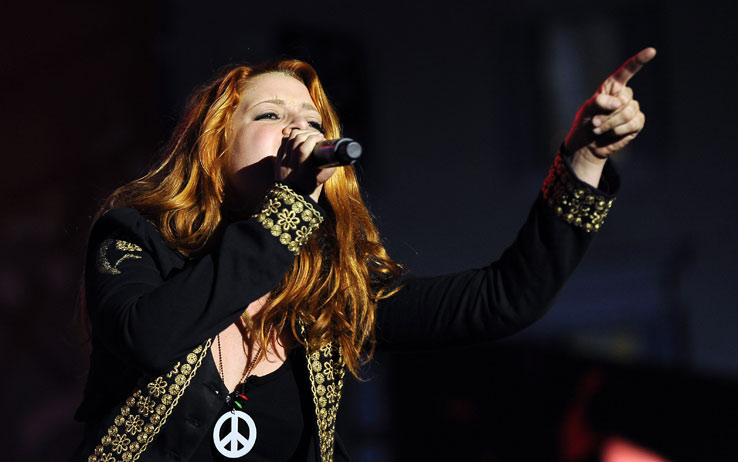
Noemi (2013–2015)

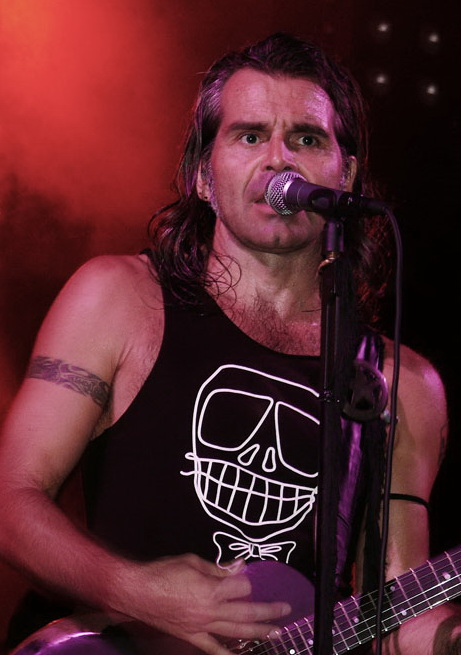
Piero Pelù (2013–2015)

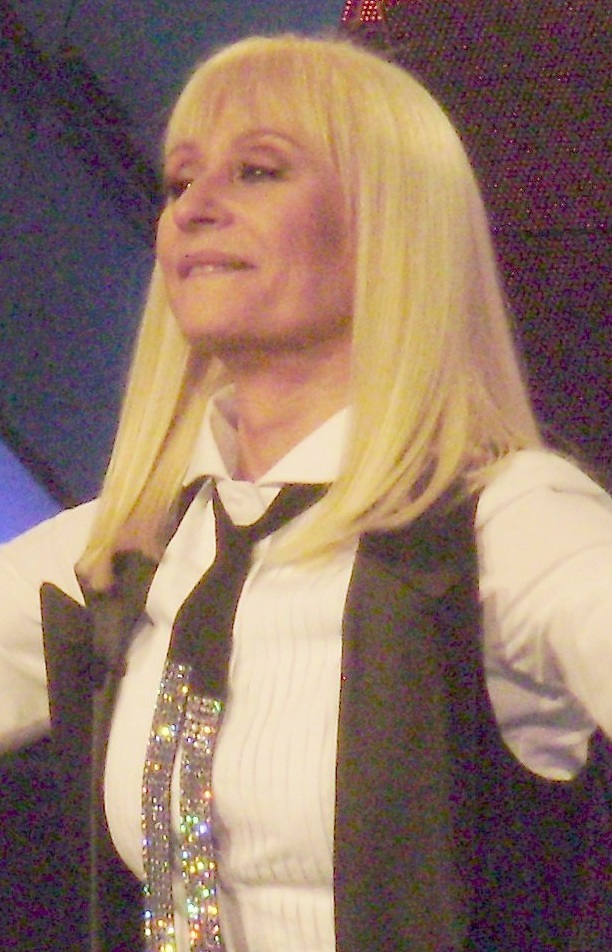
Raffaella Carrà (2013–2014, 2016)

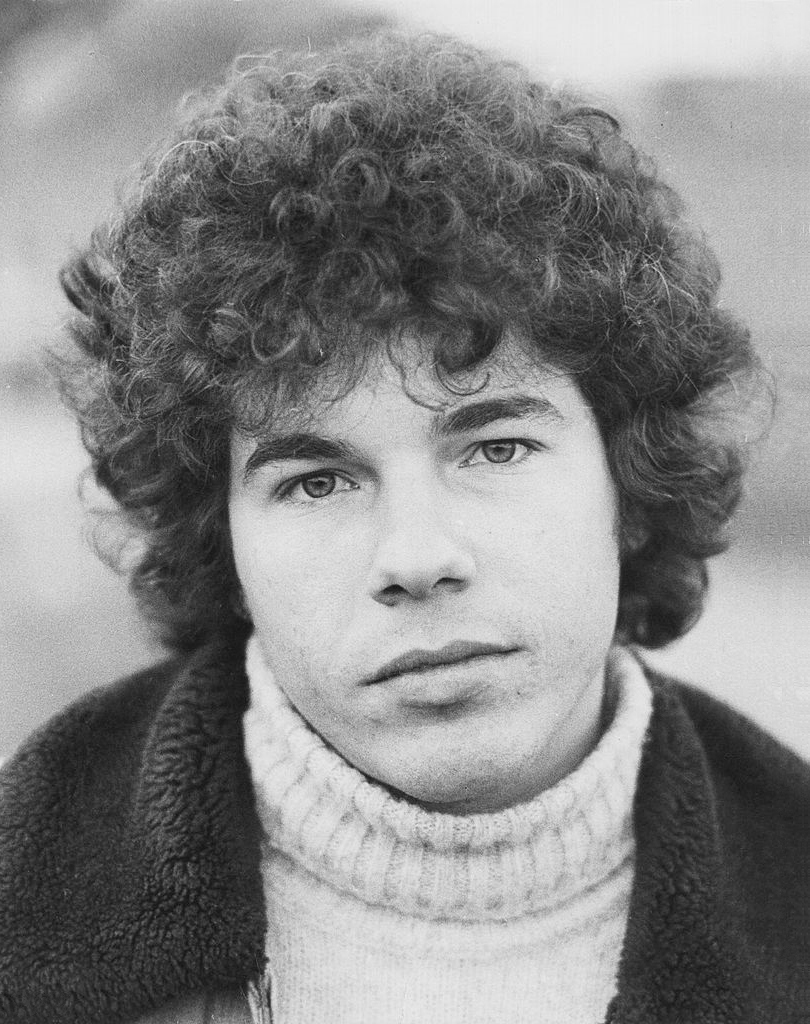
Riccardo Cocciante (2013)

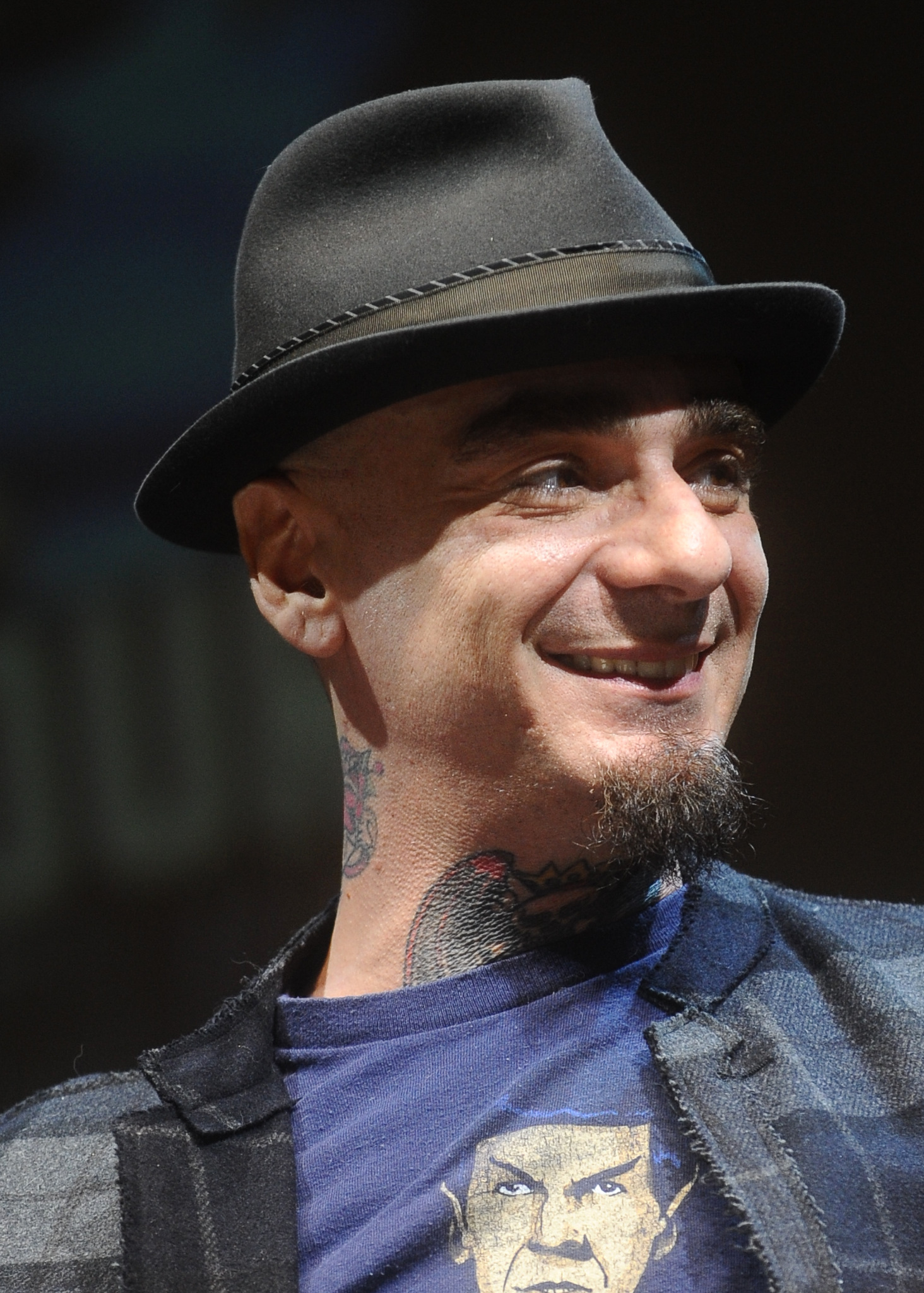
J-Ax (2014–2015, 2018)

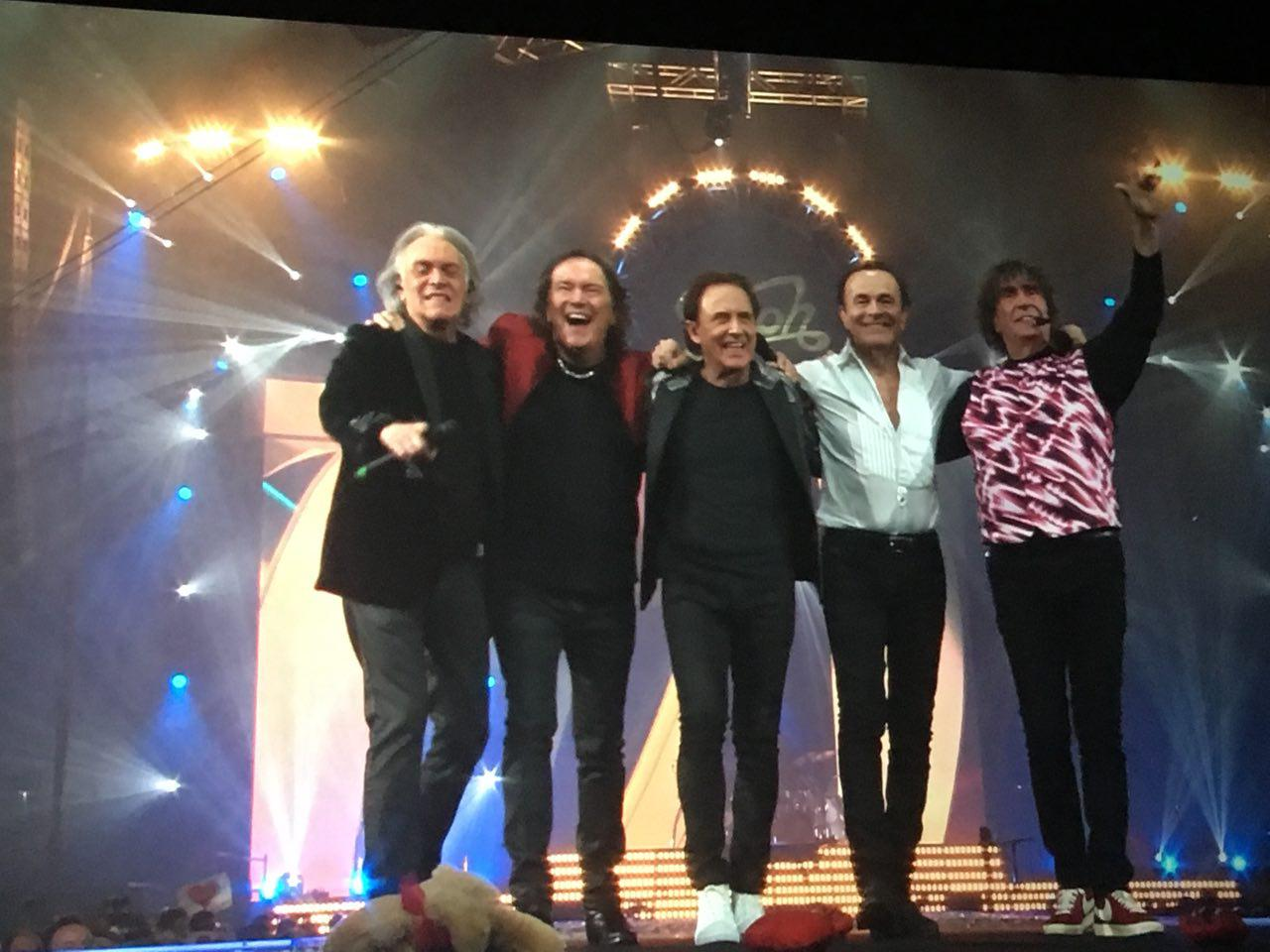
Roby and Francesco Facchinetti (2015)

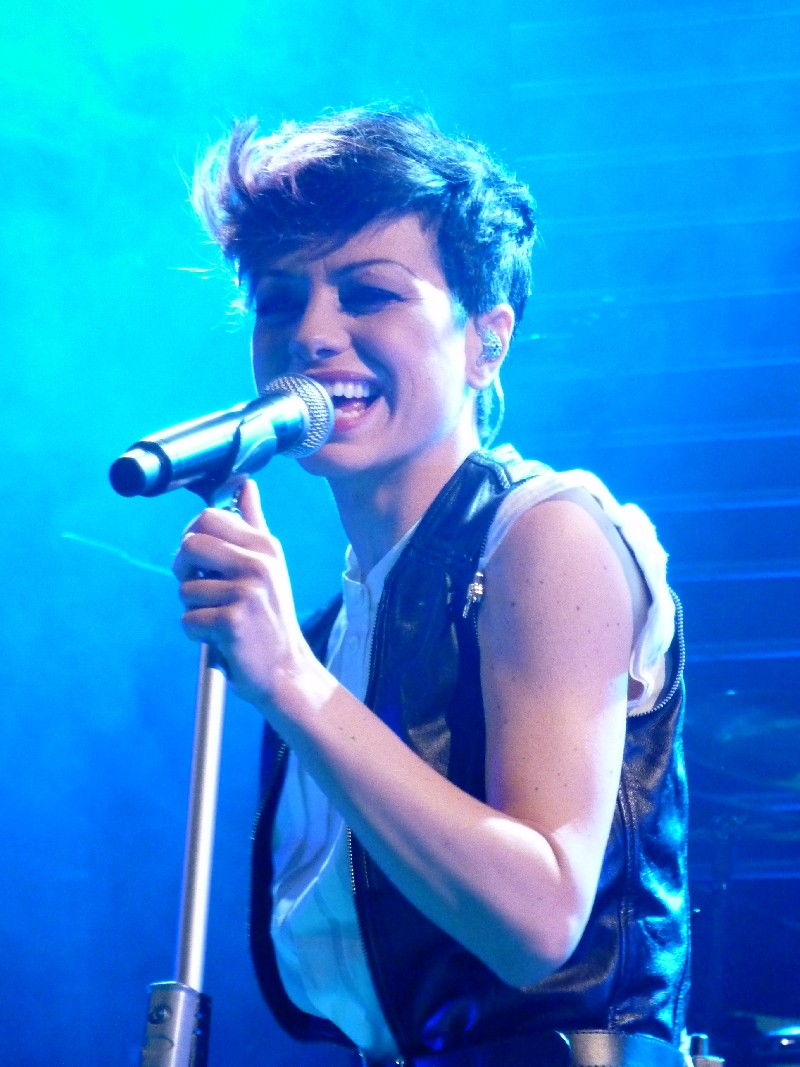
Dolcenera (2016)

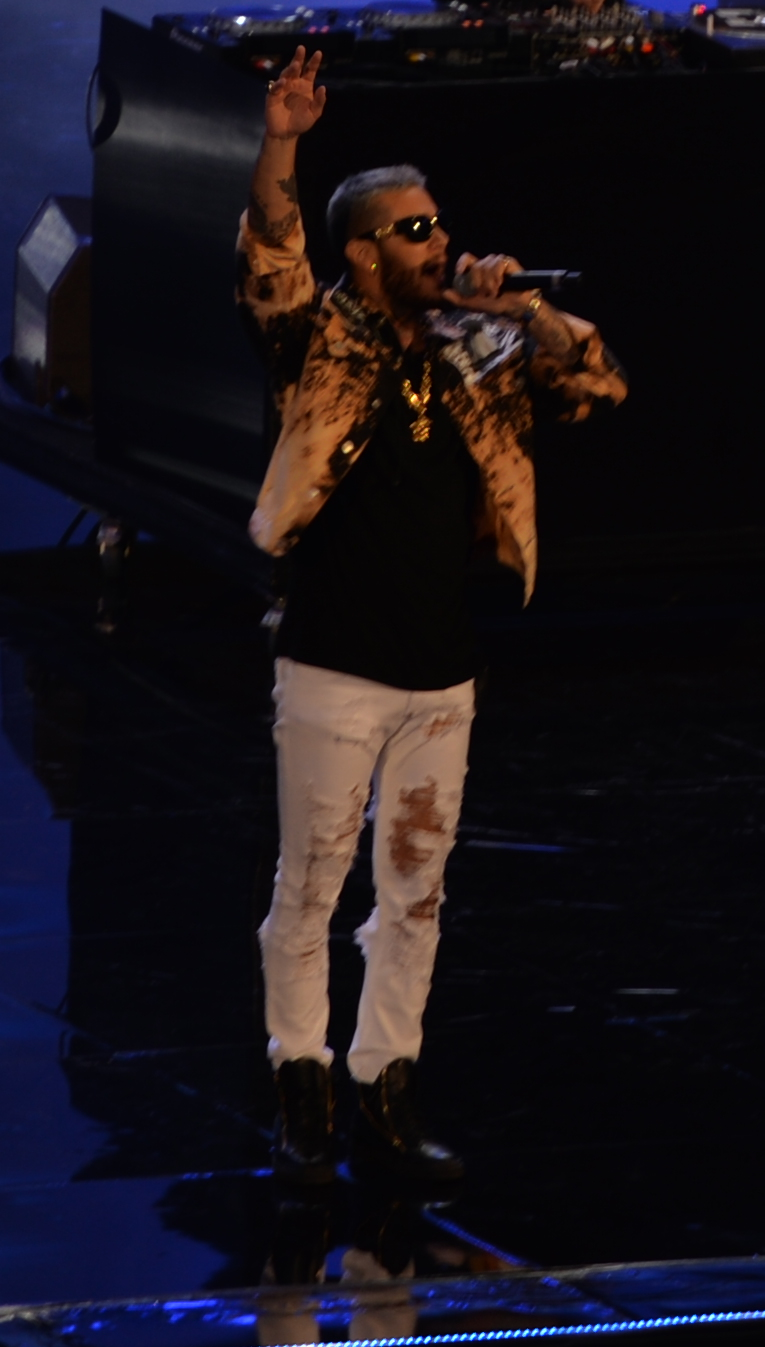
Emis Killa (2016)

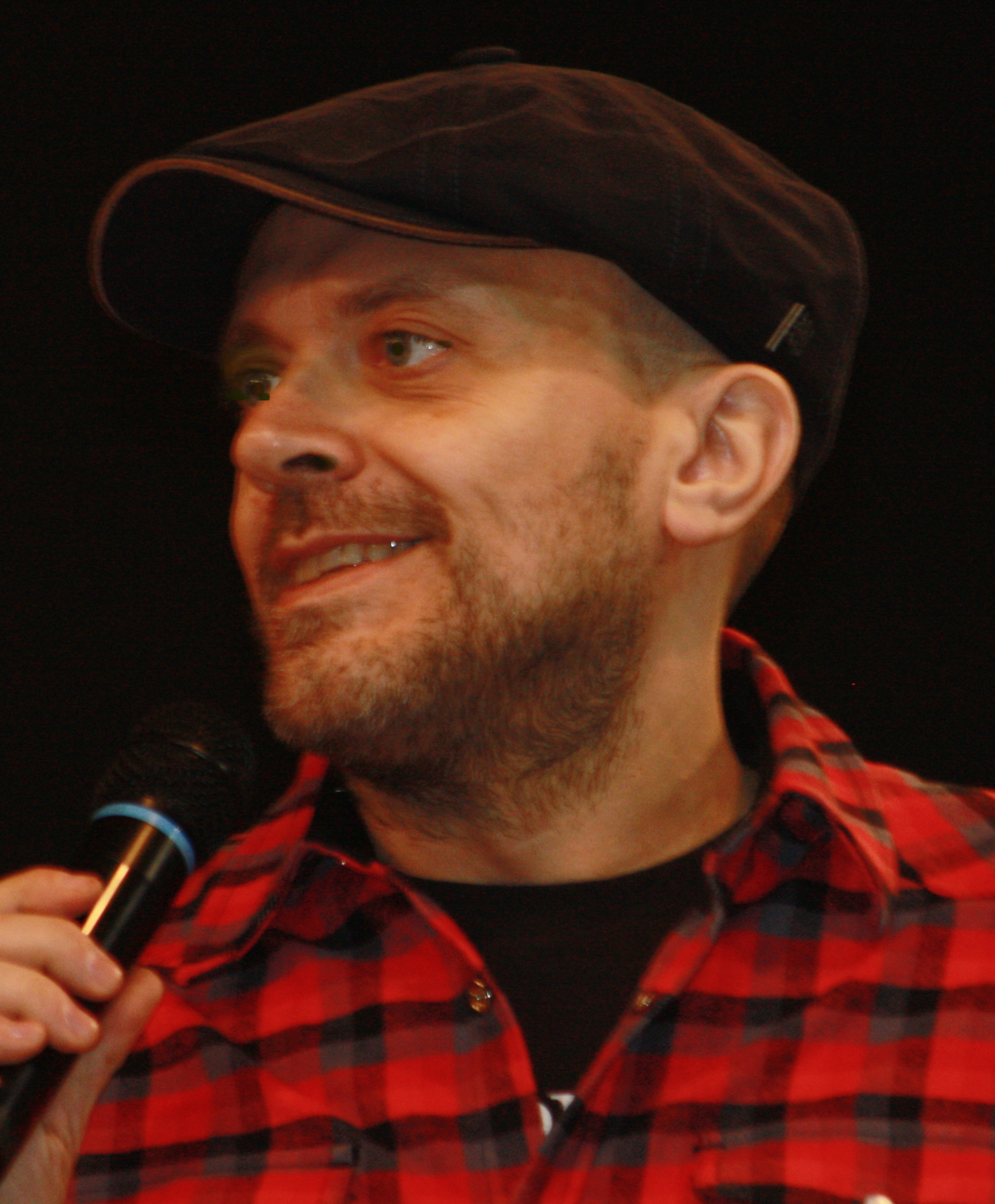
Max Pezzali (2016)

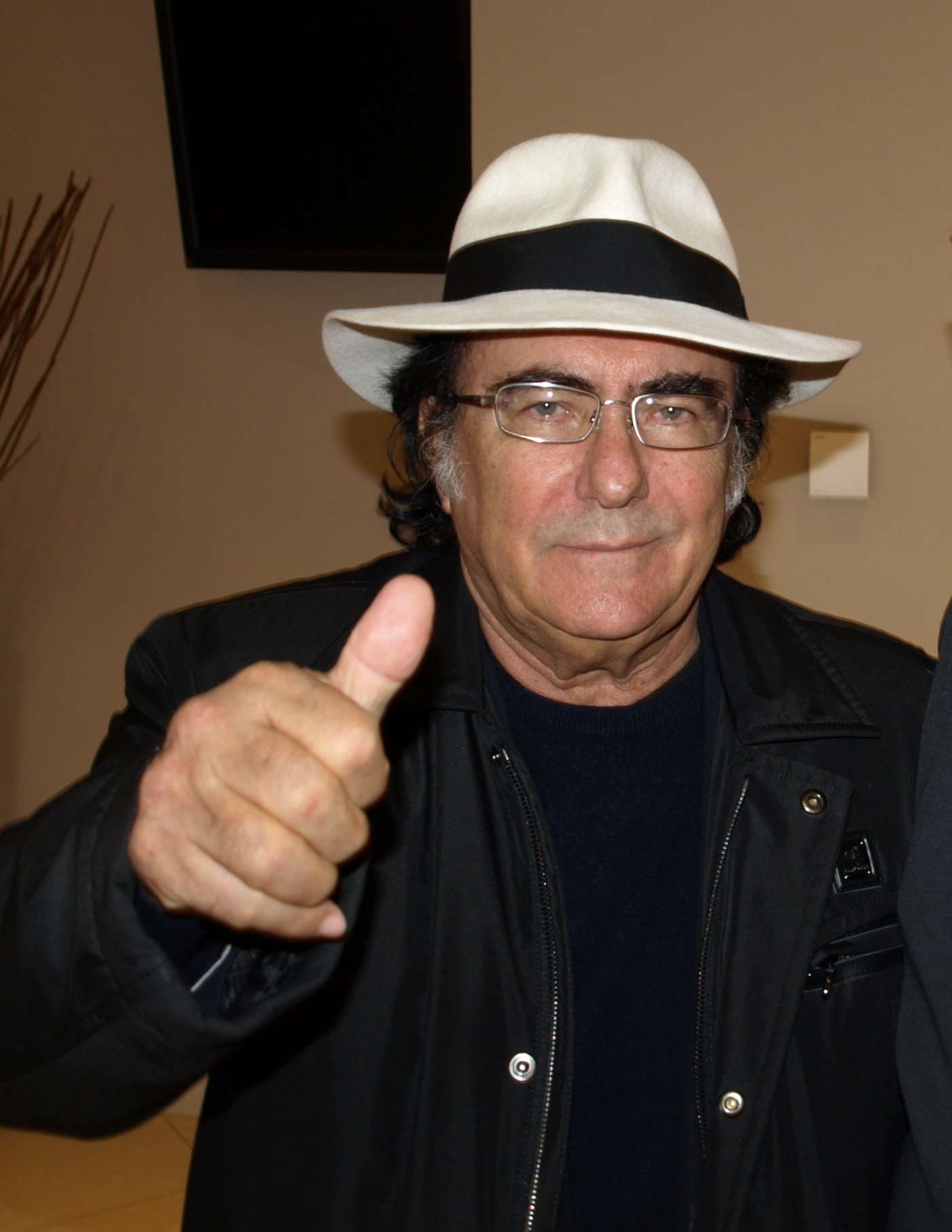
Al Bano (2018)

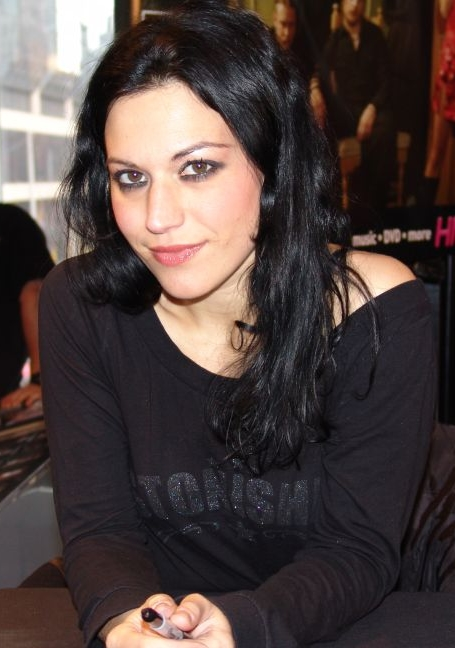
Cristina Scabbia (2018)

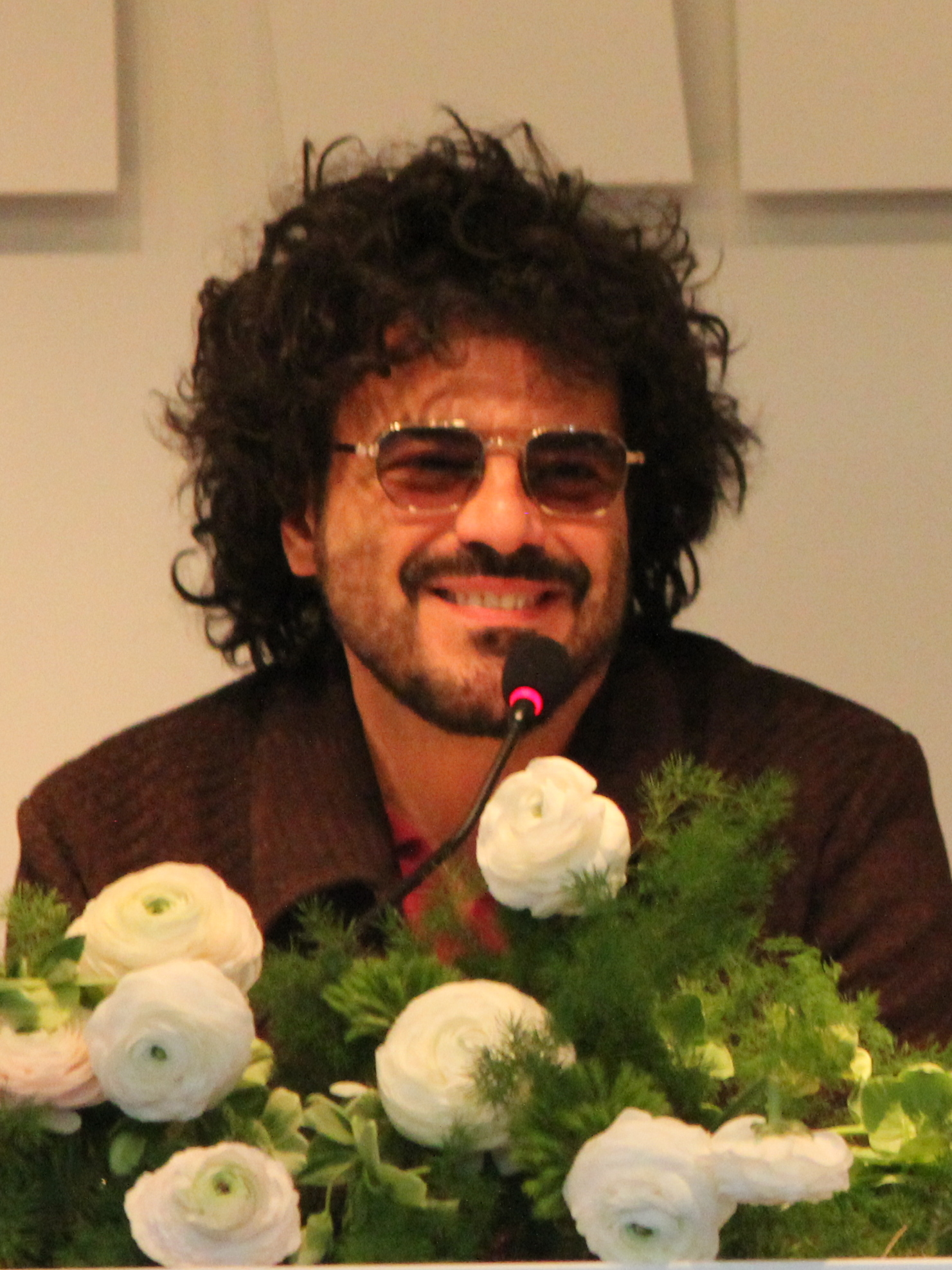
Francesco Renga (2018)

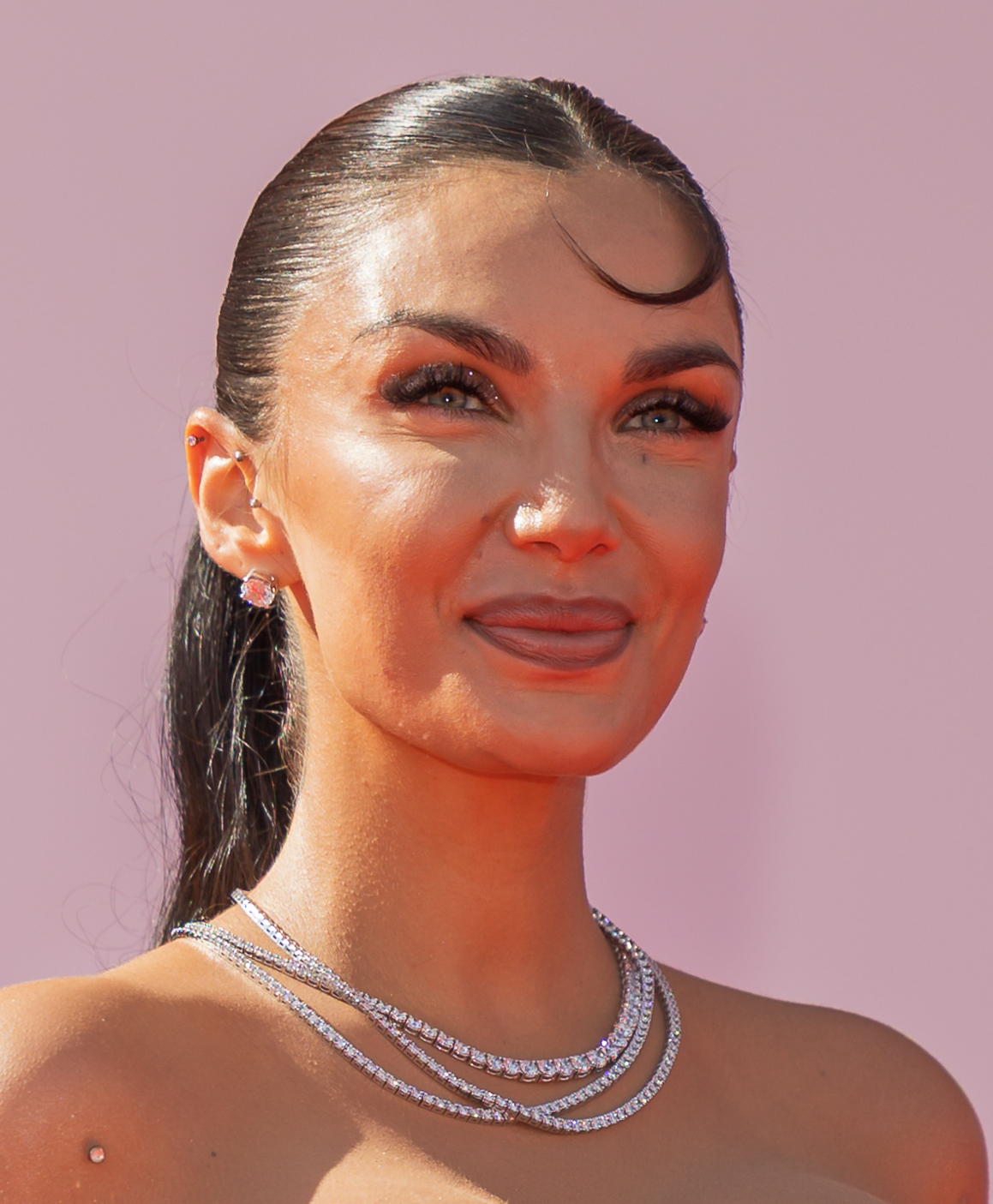
Elettra Lamborghini (2019)

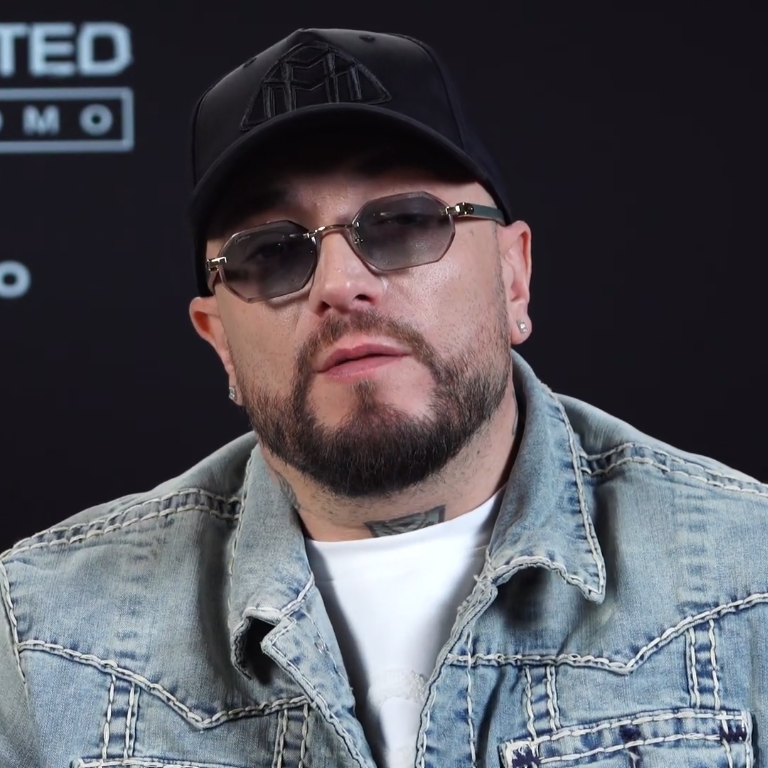
Guè Pequeno (2019)

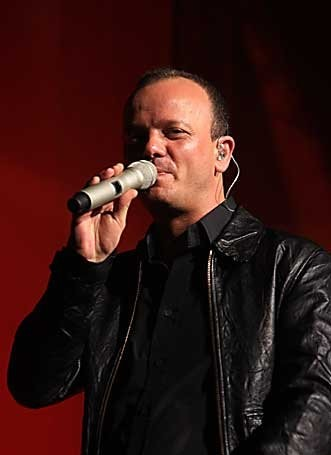
Gigi D'Alessio (2019)

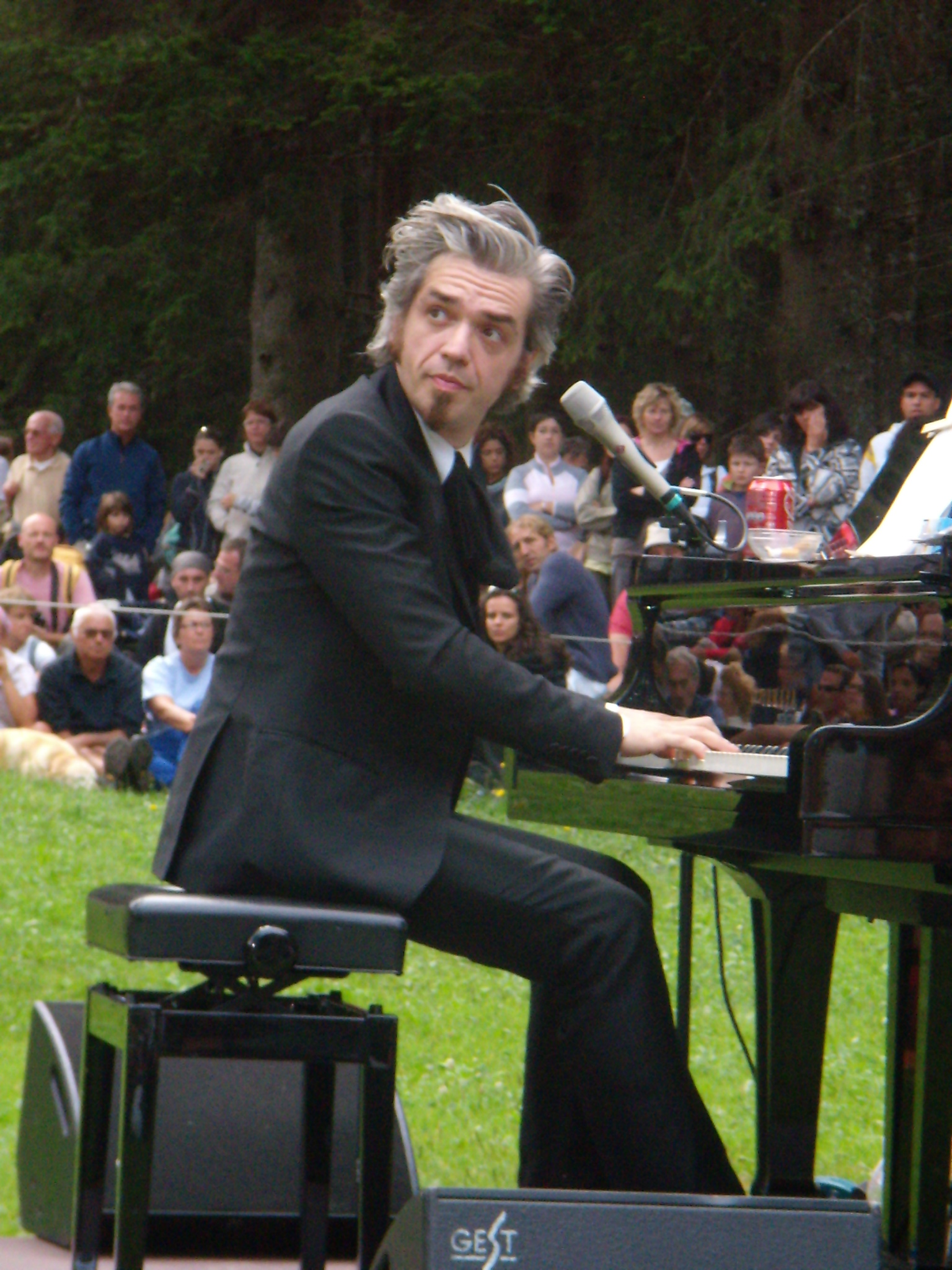
Morgan (2019)

=== Hosts ===
In the first season, the host was actor Fabio Troiano, with radio host Carolina Di Domenico serving at the liveshows in the role of V-Reporter. From the second to the fourth edition, radio and television presenter Federico Russo hosted the program, while the part relating to the web is entrusted to his colleague Valentina Correani from season two to three. Correani was replaced in the fourth edition by Alessandra "Angelina" Angeli. In the fifth edition, Federico Russo was replaced by Costantino della Gherardesca, who assumed all the duties of the main and backstage host. In the sixth season, Simona Ventura was announced as the new host.

Presenter	Seasons					
Presenter	1	2	3	4	5	6
Fabio Troiano						
Carolina Di Domenico						
Federico Russo						
Valentina Correani						
Alessandra Angeli						
Costantino della Gherardesca						
Simona Ventura						

Key
Main presenter
Backstage presenter

== Coaches and finalists ==
Color key
Winner
Runner-up
Third place
Fourth place

Season	Coaches and their finalists			
1	Piero Pelù	Raffaella Carrà	Riccardo Cocciante	Noemi
1	Timothy Cavicchini; Francesco Guasti; Cristina Balestriere; Danny Losito; Marco Cantagalli	Veronica De Simone; Manuel Foresta; Emanuele Lucas; Stefania Tasca; Matteo Lotti	Elhaida Dani; Mattia Lever; Lorenzo Campani; Giulia Saguatti; Donato Perrone	Silvia Capasso; Giuseppe Scianna; Diana Winter; Flavio Capasso; Giuliana Danzè
2	Piero Pelù	Raffaella Carrà	J-Ax	Noemi
2	Giacomo Voli; Daria Biancardi; Esther Oluloro; Giulia Dagani; Claudia Megré	Tommaso Pini; Giuseppe Maggioni; Federica Buda; Luna Palumbo; Francesco Marotta	Cristina Scuccia; Dylan Magon; Valerio Jovine; Carolina Russi; Debby Lou	Giorgia Pino; Stefano Corona; Gianmarco Dottori; Andrea Manchiero; Gianna Chillà
3	J-Ax	Noemi	Roby and Francesco Facchinetti	Piero Pelù
3	Carola Campagna; Sara Vita Felline; Maurizio Di Cesare; Raffaele Esposito; Francesca Cini	Thomas Cheval; Keeniatta Baird; Andrea Orchi; Mariangela De Santis; Daniel Petrarulo	Fabio Curto; Sarah Jane Olog; Chiara Dello Iacovo; Alberto Slitti; Alessia Labate	Roberta Carrese; Ira Green; Marco De Vincentiis; Alessandra Salerno; Tommaso Gregianin
4	Emis Killa	Raffaella Carrà	Max Pezzali	Dolcenera
4	Charles Kablan; Frances Alina Ascione; Roberta Nasti; Giuliana Ferraz	Tanya Borgese; Samuel Pietrasanta; Beatrice Ferrantino; Foxy Ladies	Elya Zambolin iWolf; Davide Carbone; Francesca Basaglia	Alice Paba; Joe Croci; Giorgia Alò; Edith Brinca
5	Francesco Renga	J-Ax	Cristina Scabbia	Al Bano
5	Asia Sagripanti; Mirco Pio Coniglio; Deborah Xhako; Marica Fortugno	Beatrice Pezzini; Antonio Marino; Riccardo Giacomini; Andrea Tramacere	Andrea Butturini; Elisabetta Eneh; Alessandra Machella; Laura Ciriaco	Maryam Tancredi; Tekemaya; Mara Sottocornola; Raimondo Cataldo
6	Morgan	Elettra Lamborghini	Gué Pequeno	Gigi D'Alessio
6	Diablo; Matteo Camellini; Erica Bazzeghini	Miriam Ayaba; Andrea Berté; Greta Giordano	Brenda Carolina Lawrence; Francesco Da Vinci; Ilenia Filippo	Carmen Pierri; Eliza G Domenico Iervolino

== Season summary ==
Warning: the following table presents a significant amount of different colors.

The Voice of Italy series overview
Season	Aired	Winner	Runner-up	Third place	Fourth place	Winning coach	Presenters		Coaches (chairs' order)			
Season	Aired	Winner	Runner-up	Third place	Fourth place	Winning coach	Main	Backstage	1	2	3	4
1	2013	Elhaida Dani	Timothy Cavicchini	Veronica Simone	Silvia Capasso	Riccardo Cocciante	Fabio Troiano	Carolina Di Domenico	Piero	Raffaella	Riccardo	Noemi
2	2014	Cristina Scuccia	Giacomo Voli	Tommaso Pini	Giorgia Pino	J-Ax	Federico Russo	Valentina Correani	Piero	Raffaella	J-Ax	Noemi
3	2015	Fabio Curto	Roberta Carrese	Carola Campagna	Thomas Cheval	Roby & Francesco	Federico Russo	Valentina Correani	J-Ax	Noemi	Roby & Francesco	Piero
4	2016	Alice Paba	Charles Kablan	Elya Zambolin	Tanya Borgese	Dolcenera	Federico Russo	Alessandra Angeli	Emis	Raffaella	Max	Dolcenera
5	2018	Maryam Tancredi	Beatrice Pezzini	Andrea Butturini	Asia Sagripanti	Al Bano	Costantino della Gherardesca		Francesco	J-Ax	Cristina	Al Bano
6	2019	Carmen Pierri	Brenda Lawrence	Miriam Ayaba	Diablo	Gigi D'Alessio	Simona Ventura		Morgan	Elettra	Gué	Gigi

== Senior spin-off ==
From November 27, 2020, a spin-off of the program, The Voice Senior, was broadcast on Rai 1, where competitors over the age of 60 participate.

== Kids version ==
The Voice Kids is the spin-off where kids ages 7–14 participate. The program is broadcast on Rai 1.

== Generations version ==
Before the finale of the fourth season of The Voice Senior, it was announced that the show would air a Generations spinoff, where family or friend groups consisting in singers of all ages are the ones who can apply. The spinoff originated from the Australian version of the show.

The first season premiered 12 April 2024 with Arisa, Clementino, Gigi D'Alessio, and Loredana Bertè as coaches. Antonella Clerici hosted the spinoff. The winner of the inaugural season was Gino & Noemi from Team Clementino.

The second season premiered on 6 March 2026. Arisa and Bertè returned as coaches alongside Clementino who, this season, is a duo coach with Rocco Hunt. Meanwhile, D'Alessio was replaced by Nek. The winner of the second season was Jessica & Gilda from Team Loredana.

The Voice Generations series overview
Season	Aired	Winner	Other finalists			Winning coach	Presenter	Coaches (chairs' order)			
Season	Aired	Winner	Other finalists			Winning coach	Presenter	1	2	3	4
1	2024	Gino & Noemi	Alessandra & Consuelo	Nicolò, Gaia & Giuseppe	Soul-Food Vocalist	Clementino	Antonella Clerici	Arisa	Clementino	Gigi	Loredana
2	2026	Jessica & Gilda	Antonio & Flora	Francesco & Paola	Matilde & Sara	Loredana Bertè	Antonella Clerici	Cleme & Rocco	Arisa	Nek	Loredana

=== Coaches and finalists ===
Color key
Winner in bold, finalists in italic.
Winner
Runner(s)-up

Season	Coaches and their finalists			
1	Arisa	Clementino	Gigi D'Alessio	Loredana Bertè
1	Alessandra & Consuelo; Giuseppe & Giovanna	**Gino & Noemi**; Anna & Erika	Soul-Food Vocalist; Raffaella & Andrea	Nicolò, Gaia & Giuseppe; Lilla & Ornella
2	Clementino & Rocco Hunt	Arisa	Nek	Loredana Bertè
2	Antonio & Flora; Dorotea & Maddalena; Matteo & Michele	Francesco & Paola; Roberta & Alice; Mariagrazia & Gennaro	Matilde & Sara; Mia, Maddalena, Manuel & Marco; Tommaso & Lorenza	**Jessica & Gilda**; Liliana & Francesco; Manuela & Ennio
