= Frappato =

Variety of grape

Frappato di Vittoria
- Grape (Vitis)
- Color of berry skin: Noir
- Species: Vitis vinifera
- Also called: Frappato and other synonyms
- Origin: Italy
- Notable regions: Sicily
- Sex of flowers: Hermaphrodite
- VIVC number: 4225

Frappato di Vittoria or Frappato is a red Italian wine grape variety planted primarily in Sicily. As a varietal, Frappato produces light bodied wines with a distinct grapey aroma. It is most commonly seen as a component of Sicily's only DOCG wine, Cerasuolo di Vittoria, which consists of 30-50% Frappato and 50-70% Nero d'Avola.

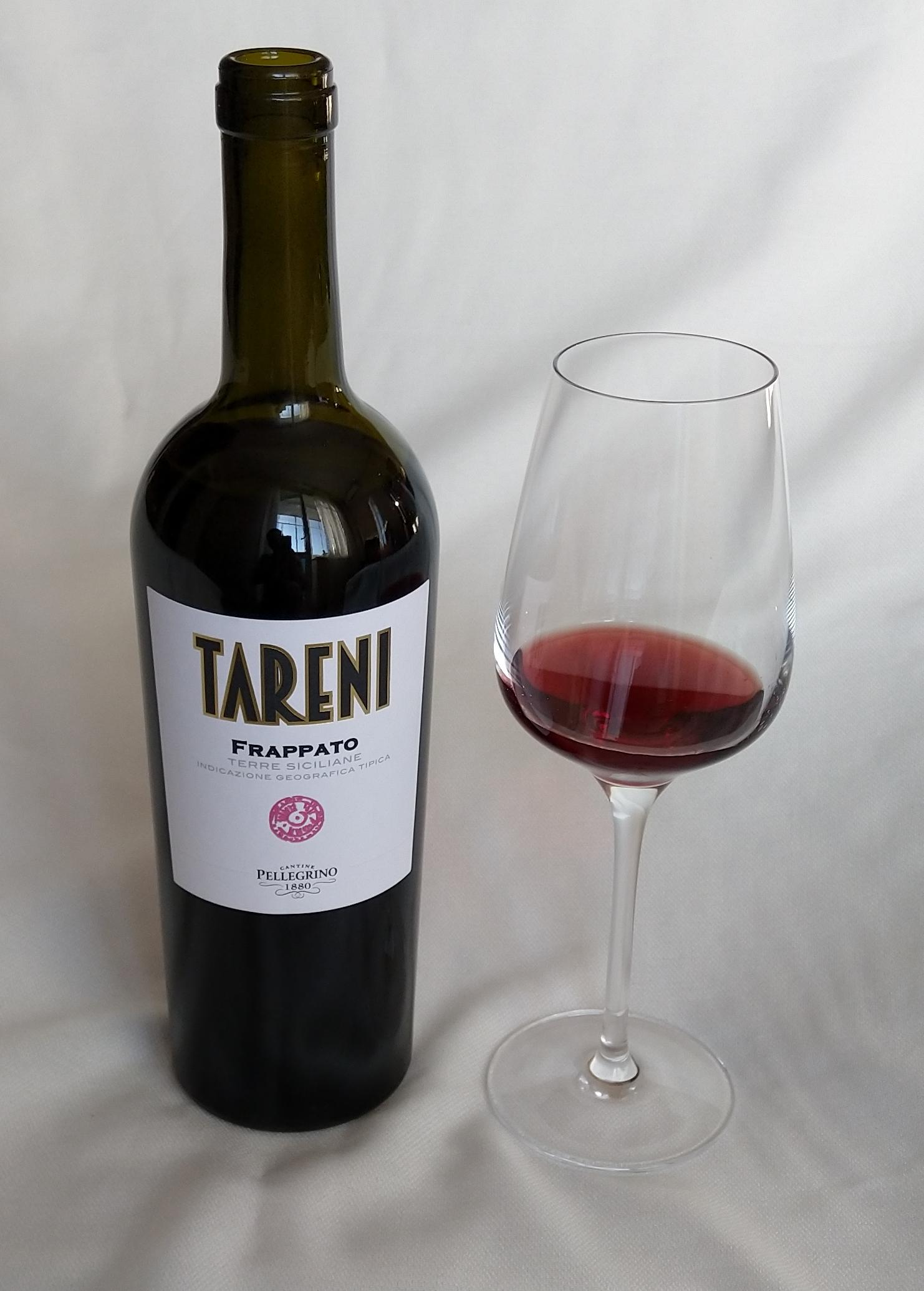
A varietal Frappato wine from Sicily.

An Italian study published in 2008 using DNA typing showed a close genetic relationship between Sangiovese on the one hand and ten other Italian grape varieties on the other hand, including Frappato. It is therefore likely that Frappato is a crossing of Sangiovese and another, so far unidentified, grape variety.

== Synonyms ==
Frappato di Vittoria is also known under the synonyms Frappato, Frappato Nero, Frappato Nero di Vittoria, Frappatu, Frappatu di Vittoria, Nerello, Nerello di Catania, and Nero Capitano.
