= Salvo Sallemi =

Italian politician (born 1977)

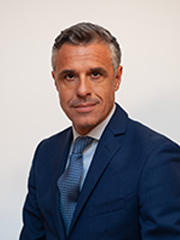
- Sallemi in 2022

Member of the Senate
- Incumbent
- Assumed office 13 October 2022
- Constituency: Sicily – 05

Personal details
- Born: 31 January 1977 (age 49)
- Party: Brothers of Italy (since 2013)

Salvatore Sallemi (born 31 January 1977) is an Italian politician serving as a member of the Senate since 2022. He has served as deputy group leader of Brothers of Italy since 2022.
