= Cerasuolo di Vittoria =

Italian DOCG red wine from Sicily

- Wine region
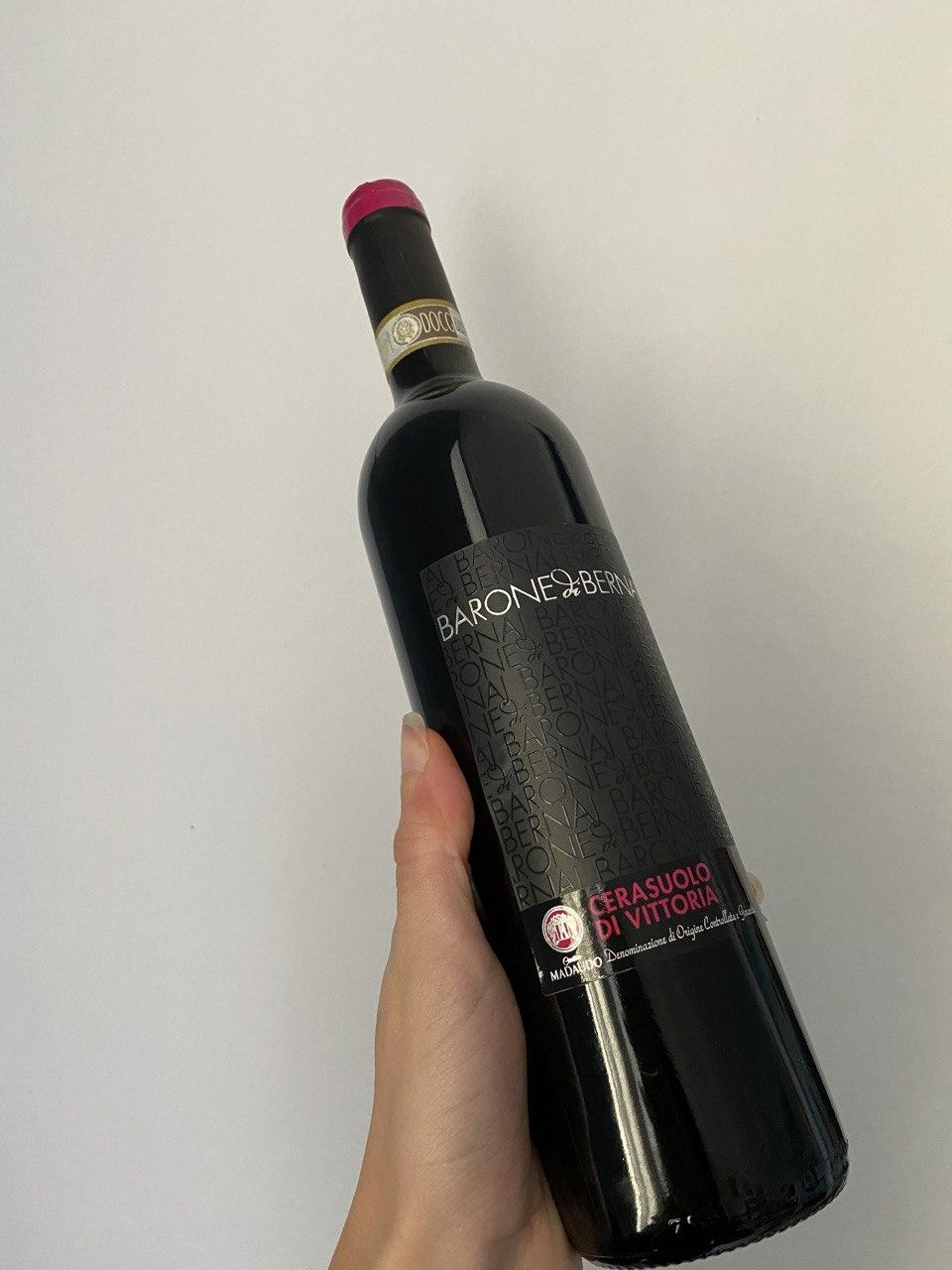
- Type: DOCG
- Year established: 2005 (DOC, 1973)
- Country: Italy
- Part of: Sicily
- Other regions in Sicily: Vittoria (DOC)
- Sub-regions: Classico
- Size of planted vineyards: 152 hectares (380 acres)
- Varietals produced: Nero d'Avola (50–70%); Frappato (remainder)
- Wine produced: 6,410 hectolitres (141,000 imp gal; 169,000 US gal)
- Comments: Data from 2019

Cerasuolo di Vittoria is a dry red Italian wine from a region around the comune of Vittoria, Sicily. The only wine with DOCG status in Sicily, it is made from a blend of two Sicilian grape varieties, Nero d'Avola (locally known as Calabrese) at between 50% and 70%, with Frappato as the remainder. The DOCG rules also include regulation of cropping rates and a minimum alcohol level of 13%. Cerasuolo means "cherry red" and refers to the colour of the resulting blend of these grapes.

== History ==
The denomination was first created as a DOC in 1973, and upgraded to DOCG status in 2005, the first awarded in Sicily. The large region delineated in the DOCG definition is the same as the Vittoria DOC, which has less strict rules on cropping, ageing, and grape blends, and includes a white wine made from Ansonica.

== Viticulture and winemaking ==
Some makers, for example COS, mature the wine in terracotta amphorae rather than oak barrels in order to eliminate the influence of wood on the flavour of the wine. The wine combines the fragrant, floral characters of Frappato with the full body and tannins from Nero d'Avola.

== See also ==
- List of Italian DOCG wines
