= Battles of Enna (829) =

- Part of the Muslim conquest of Sicily; Arab–Byzantine wars
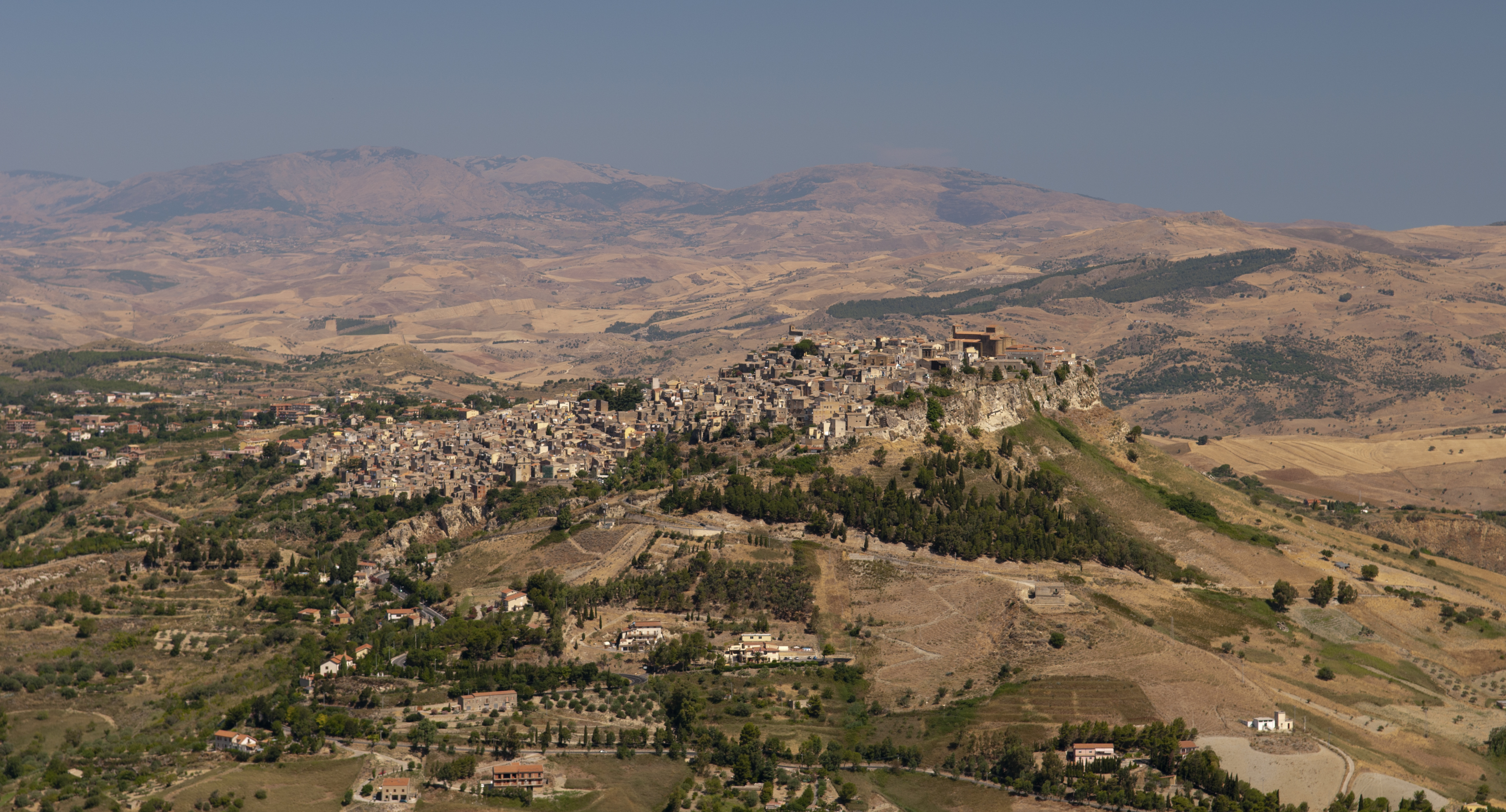
- Modern view of Calascibetta and the countryside surrounding Enna
Date	Spring 829 – Autumn 829
Location	Enna, Sicily
Result	Byzantine victory Full results: Siege of Enna: Byzantine victory; 1st Battle of Enna: Aghlabid victory; 2nd Battle of Enna: Byzantine victory; 3rd Battle of Enna: Byzantine victory

Belligerents
Aghlabid dynasty	Byzantine Empire

Commanders and leaders
Muhammad ibn Abi’l-Jawari # Zuhayr ibn Gawth	Theodotus

Strength
Unknown	Unknown

Casualties and losses
Very Heavy	Heavy: 90 officers captured

The Battles of Enna were a series of engagements fought between the Aghlabids and a Byzantine expeditionary force near the fortress of Castrogiovanni (modern Enna) in Sicily. In the first battle, the Byzantines commander Theodotus was defeated by the Aghlabids and forced to retreat into Enna. However, aided by the subsequent death of the Aghlabid leader Muhammad ibn Abi'l-Jawari, Theodotus marched out and won two subsequent battles against the Aghlabid army. Losing much of their fighting strength and their base camp to the Byzantines, the remnants of the Aghlabid army were driven from the vicinity of Enna, marking a temporary check on the Muslim conquest of Sicily.

== Background ==
Following their failed Siege of Syracuse, the Aghlabids sought to bolster their position in Sicily with a series of conquests. Their first target was the formidable fortress of Enna, which was situated atop a mountain. The Arabs attempted to use their pretender Euphemius to secure the surrender of the garrison at Enna. The defenders promised to make a formal submission if Euphemius would send the Aghlabid army away and negotiate in person. However, when Euphemius arrived with some of his soldiers, he was assassinated by the delegation. The garrison of Enna may have been emboldened to such an act due to their faith in the ability of Emperor Michael II to defeat the Arabs in Sicily, and they may have received information that the emperor had prepared an expedition to capitalize on the Byzantine victory over the Aghlabids at the Siege of Syracuse. Michael dispatched a new strategos, the Patrikios Theodotus, with an army to reinforce Sicily. His expeditionary force was significant, and included Armenian and possibly also German contingents.

== Battles of Enna ==
=== First Battle ===
Theodotus arrived in Sicily during the spring of 829. After disembarking, he immediately marched to confront the Aghlabid army under Muhammad ibn Abi’l-Jawari. The two sides fought a battle near Enna, in which the Byzantines sustained a heavy defeat, with 90 of their officers being taken prisoner by the Aghlabids. Theodotus and his remaining men managed to retreat into Enna, against which the Aghlabids resumed their siege. However, the Arabs were unable to fully exploit their victory, due to the death of their commander Muhammad ibn Abi’l-Jawari soon after, probably in April. Abi'l was succeeded in his position by Zuhayr ibn Gawth, whom the Aghlabid army elected as their leader.

=== Second Battle ===
Following the change in Aghlabid leadership, Theodotus led his army out of Enna to renew operations against the Arabs and break the siege. The Byzantines soon intercepted an Aghlabid raiding column, which was ambushed and destroyed. When news of this defeat the reached the main Arab forces, the Aghlabids resolved to avenge their losses. Consequently, the entire Arab army marched out against Theodotus' army on the following day and engaged the Byzantines in battle. This time, the Byzantines soundly defeated the Aghlabids, killing more than a thousand warriors and pursuing the rest into their fortified encampment. With this battlefield success, Theodotus broke the Aghlabid siege of Enna.

=== Third Battle ===
Despite his victory, Theodotus declined to commit his men in an attempt to storm the Aghlabid encampment, as such an action would risk incurring severe losses. Consequently, he invested the camp, blockading the defenders from foraging. The Aghlabids held insufficient supplies within their encampment to maintain a defence for long, and eventually resolved break the blockade. The Arab army sallied out after darkness to conduct a night attack against the besiegers. Thoigh, Theodotus had anticipated this manoeuvre and had prepared an ambush for the enemy sortie. In a stratagem reminiscent of later practices described in the 10th century De velitatione bellica, Theodotus had stationed his men in concealed positions surrounding their encampment. When the Aghlabids then entered and dispersed to loot the encampment, Theodotus sprung his trap and committed his men to the attack. In the resulting engagement, the Aghlabid warriors were surprised and most were killed in the fighting. The surviving remnants of the Aghlabid army abandoned their encampment and fled towards the fortress of Menaenum.

== Aftermath ==
Theodotus followed up his victory with a pursuit of the defeated Aghlabid army, putting them to siege at Menaenum. The Byzantines blockaded the fortress tightly, reducing the already battered Arab army to such a starved state that they were forced to eat pack animals and dogs. Hearing news of the Theodotus' victory, another the Aghlabid detachment stationed at Girgenti tore down the fortifications and abandoned the town, withdrawing to Mazara without attempting to relieve Menaeum. With Aghlabid control over Sicily waning, Byzantine victory appeared imminent.

The siege of Menaeum nonetheless dragged on until summer 830, when an Andalusian raiding fleet of 300 ships, carrying an estimated 20,000 - 30,000 troops, arrived in Sicily. The Aghlabids managed to dispatch a messenger to plead to the Andalusian raiders for relief, with their leader Asbagh ibn Wakil agreeing to march against Theodotus on the condition that the North African Aghlabids unite under his own command. Due to the strength of this relief force, Theodotus was forced to lift his siege of Menaeum and withdraw to Enna. The Muslim coalition then renewed the offensive, with their army based at Mazara putting Palermo under siege, while the Aghlabid-Andalusian force that had united at Menaeum advanced to besiege another fortified town (probably Calloniana). Although this venture ended in success with the town falling to the Muslims, the strength of the Arab armies was weakened by an outbreak of plague during the operation, which took the life of many warriors and the Andalusian leader Asbagh ibn Wakil, forcing them to withdraw after sacking the town. Seeking to regain the initiative, Theodotus advanced from Enna in pursuit. Although Theodotus defeated the Arabs in a series of skirmishes, killing so great a number of their warriors that the surviving Andalusians previously serving Asbagh fled to their ships and retreated to Iberia, Theodotus himself died at this juncture, possibly killed during one of his victorious engagements. Ultimately by 831, both sides had lost their leaders and had sustained severe losses in the previous years' fighting, but with the death of Theodotus the Byzantines lost the initiative in Sicily and failed to save the besieged Palermo from its fall, which came in September 831. (Note: The Cambridge Chronicle described a battle between Theodotus and Asbagh ibn Wakil after the relief of Menaeum in September 830, during which Theodotus was killed, which was the version followed by Alexander Vasiliev and Michele Amari. However, Al-Nuwayri's account specified that Theodotus and his army returned to the safety of Enna without a battle, and thus Warren Treadgold reasons that Theodotus was killed in one of the sanguinary encounters against the retreating army formerly under Asbagh's command mentioned by Ibn 'Idhari, despite the Byzantines being victorious in these battles.)

== Bibliography ==
- Treadgold, Warren (1988). The Byzantine Revival, 780–842. Stanford University Press.
- Vasiliev, Alexander A. (1935). Byzance et les Arabes, Tome I: La dynastie d'Amorium (820–867). Corpus Bruxellense Historiae Byzantinae (in French). Vol. 1. French ed.: Henri Grégoire, Marius Canard. Brussels: Éditions de l'Institut de philologie et d'histoire orientales.
- Amari, Michele (1858). Storia dei musulmani di Sicilia [History of the Muslims of Sicily]. Vol. 2. Florence: Felice Le Monnier.
