= Maria Santissima della Stella, Barrafranca =

Church in Sicily, Italy

The church of Maria Santissima della Stella (or Maria Ss. della Stella) is a Roman Catholic parish church in the town of Barrafranca, in the province of Enna, region of Sicily, Italy.

== History and description ==
Prior to 1598, a church at this site was dedicated to St Alexander; but it was modified and rededicated to the Marian devotion of Santa Maria della Stella, in part prompted by the presence of an ancient Byzantine icon of this image of the Virgin Mary. The church was rebuilt and expanded, and the bell-tower with an onion-dome like roof was built in 1600. The single nave was refurbished into a three nave church in 1900, and decorated inside with neoclassical style stuccos by the Signorelli brothers.

The interior houses a number of paintings including altarpieces depicting Sant'Isidoro Agricola (Isidore the Laborer) by Pietro d’Asaro and a St Alexander by Francesco Vaccaro. The ceiling has six octagonal frescoes by Paolo Terranova. They depict:

- Jesus in the house of Mary and Martha
- Ascension of Christ
- Pentecost
- Transfiguration of Christ
- Santa Maria della Stella
- Immaculate Conception

The venerated icon of the Maria della Stella was stolen in 1977 and was replaced by a painting by Gaetano Vicari.
