= Santa Maria dell'Itria, Ragusa =

Church building in Ragusa, Italy

Coordinates: 36.9267°N 14.7364°E

Santa Maria dell' Itria is a Baroque-style, Roman Catholic church located in the city of Ragusa, in southern Sicily, Italy.

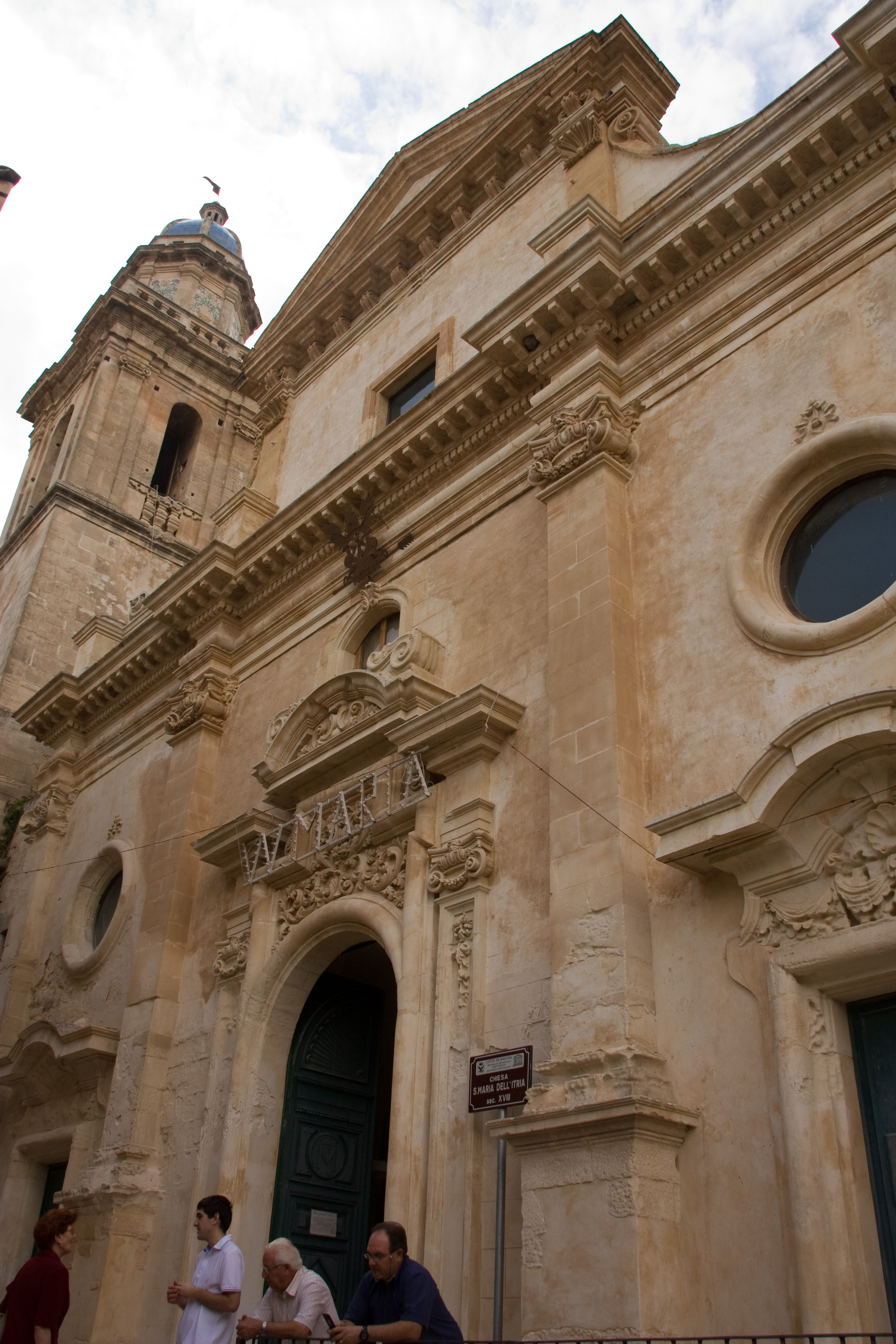
facade and belltower from the narrow alley

== History ==
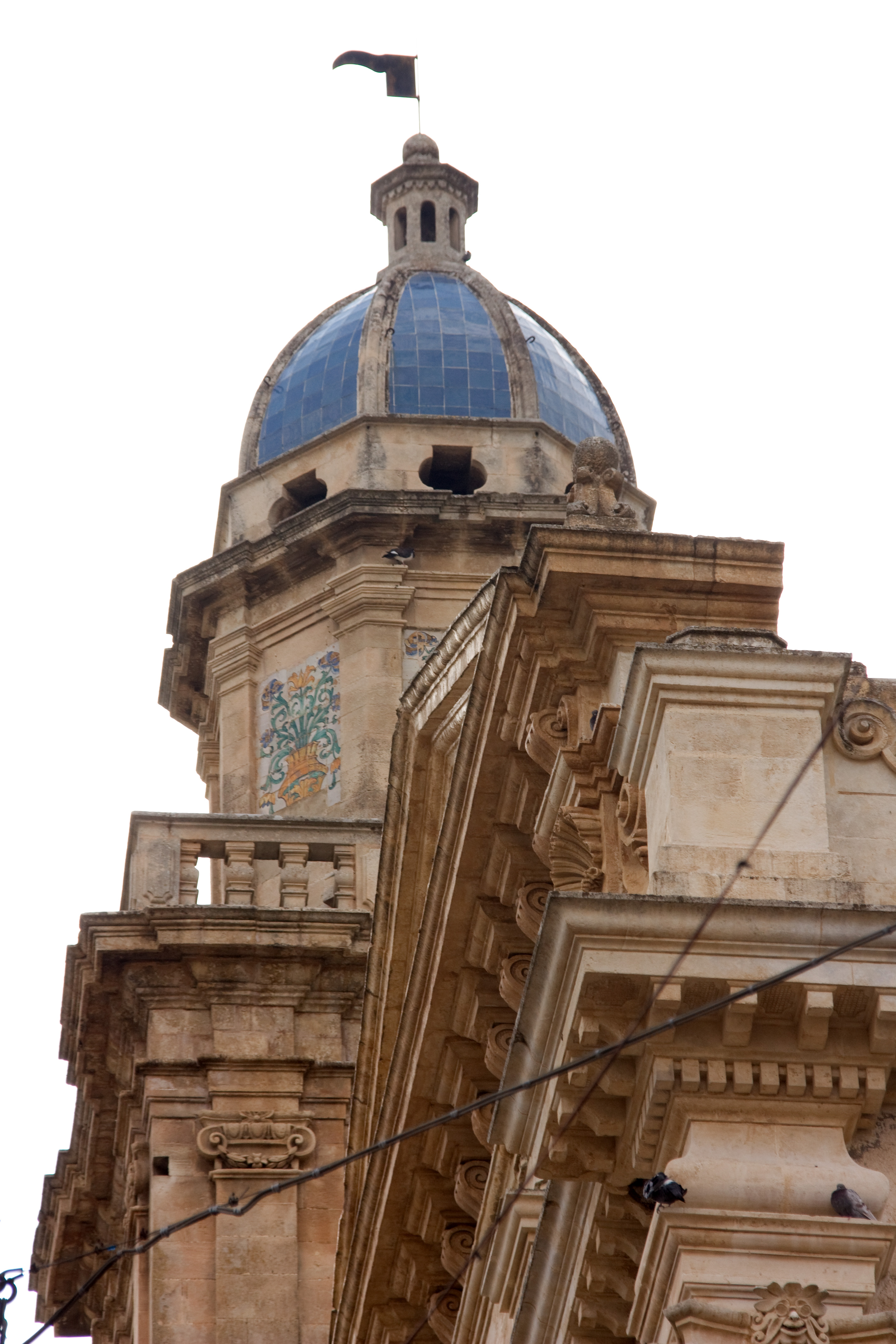
Maiolica roofed bell tower

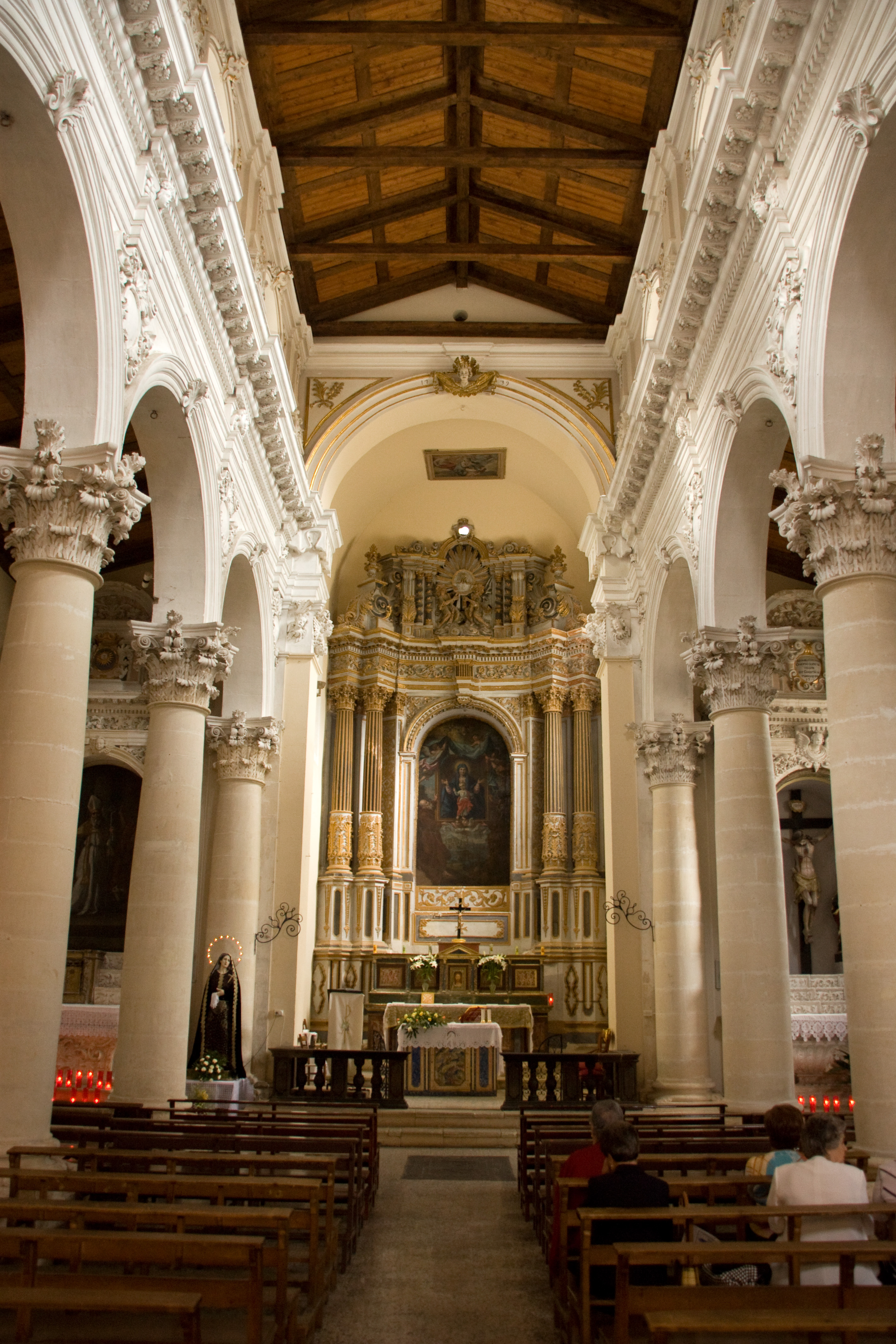
Central nave with Corinthian columns

A church was erected here in the 14th century in the former Jewish quarter of the "Cartellone", by the order of the Knights of Malta, specifically the Commenda di Modica-Randazzo, founded by the Count of Modica born to the Chiaramonte family. The symbols of an octagonal cross hearken to this group.

The initial church was dedicated to the Holy Bishop Giuliano l'Ospedaliere, and there was an adjacent hospice to the church. The church was little damaged by the earthquake of 1693, and was not modified until the first half of the 18th-century to modernize the church in a baroque style. The façade, completed in 1740. The interior has a rich decoration of floral terracotta decorations. The interior has a central nave and two aisles separated by Corinthian columns. The arch of the presbytery was completed in 1739.

The church has five lateral altars (1741-1758) enriched by sculptures and intaglio by the Cultraro family. Among these, the altars of San Giuliano and of the Crucifix, the oldest, have some of the most elaborate decoration with garlands of flower and fruit. The altars of San Biagio and the Holy Family are more restrained. The altar of the presbytery houses the canvas depicting the Madonna dell'Idria, derived from the Greek Odigitria meaning the Our Lady Showing the Way. At the start of the right nave is the Chapel of the Addolorata completed in the 19th century.
