= Siege of Palermo (830–831) =

- Part of the Muslim conquest of Sicily; Arab–Byzantine wars
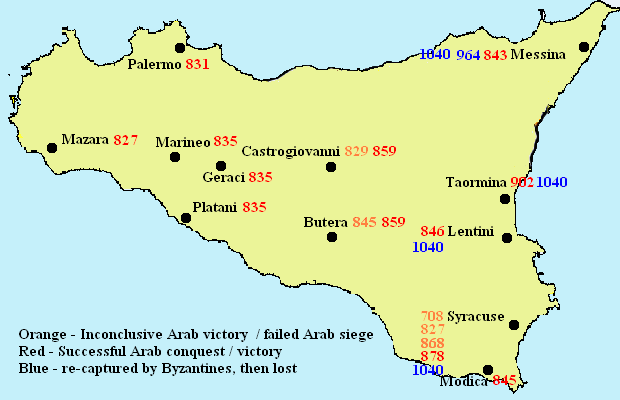
- Arab campaigns in Sicily
Date	August 830 – 12 September 831
Location	Palermo
Result	Aghlabid victory

Belligerents
Aghlabid dynasty	Byzantine Empire

Commanders and leaders
Unknown	Symeon the Sparthius (surrendered)

Strength
10,000 men	Unknown

Casualties and losses
Unknown	Heavy; 3,000 captured

The Siege of Palermo was a military engagement between the Aghlabid Arabs and the Byzantine garrison of Palermo. The Aghlabids launched their conquest of Sicily. Their target was Palermo, whom they besieged for an entire year before capitulating in 831. The success at Palermo gave the Arabs a strong hold in Sicily.

== Background ==
The Aghlabids of Ifriqiya launched their conquest of Sicily in 827. They defeated a Byzantine army and captured Mazara del Vallo, which gave them a foothold in Sicily. In the summer of 830, a large Arab fleet led by Asbagh ibn Wakil from Al-Andalus raided Sicily. The Byzantine Strategos of Sicily, Theodotus, did not dare to prevent the landing of the Andalusians. Instead, he contented himself with besieging the Muslims who held Mineo. The Muslims in Mineo asked the Andalusians for help in exchange for Asbagh to lead the Arab forces. They agreed; they began their march to relieve Mineo. Theodotus was unable to face the Andalusians and retreated to Enna. The Aghlabids in Mazara were reinforced by Andalusian parties who set out to besiege Palermo in August 830. Meanwhile, Asbagh abandoned Mineo and went to besiege another town, possibly Calloniana.

== Siege ==
The Muslim army who went to besiege Palermo numbered 10,000 men. Palermo was surrounded by an inlet of sea and lagoons. The Byzantine emperor Theophilos was not able to send reinforcements due to lack of ships as they were fighting the Arabs of Crete. Nevertheless, the inhabitants of Palermo valiantly defended themselves against the Muslims for a year. The city was led by Symeon the Spatharius. Despite the valiant defense, there was a plague raging on Sicily for four years, which dwindled the number of inhabitants in the city. Meanwhile, the Andalusian army that was besieging Calloniana contracted the plague and killed many, including Asbagh. Theodotus saw this chance and defeated them, inflicting heavy losses. The defeated Andalusians retreated from Sicily to Spain.

Even with the defeat of the Andalusians, it did not affect the operations in Palermo. In fact, many of the Andalusian officers joined the Muslim camp in Palermo, hoping for a great success. Finally, on September 12 of 831, after supplies ran out and there was no hope for any reinforcements, the Byzantines surrendered. Symeon, Bishop Luke, and the Byzantine garrison were granted safe passage to Constantinople by sea. The remaining 3,000 inhabitants were enslaved.

== Aftermath ==
Palermo became the capital of the Arabs in Sicily. This formed a colony in the west, which was close to Ifriqiya. The Aghlabid emir dispatched a new governor to Sicily on March 8, 832. The capture of Palermo by the Arabs shocked Theophilos, who attempted to make peace with the Abbasids in order to focus on Sicily. Luckily for the Byzantines, a new dissension between Arabs and Andalusians stopped their conquests temporarily for three years.

== Sources ==
- Warren Treadgold (1988), The Byzantine revival, 780–842.
- Vasiliev, Alexander A. (1935). Byzantium and the Arabs. Volume I, The Amorium dynasty (820–867) (in French).
- Amari, Michele (1854). Storia dei Musulmani di Sicilia, Vol I. (in Italian).
- Saul David (2012), The Illustrated Encyclopedia of Warfare, From Ancient Egypt to Iraq.
