= Santa Maria dell'Itria =

Santa Maria dell'Itria (or Madonna dell'Idria etc) is derived from Santa Maria dell Odigitria, referring to the Marian iconic veneration of the originally Byzantine Virgin Hodegetria. There are a number of churches in Italy with this name, including:

- Santa Maria dell'Itria, Barrafranca, Sicily
- Santa Maria d'Itria, Niscemi, Sicily
- Santa Maria dell'Itria dei Cocchieri, Palermo, Sicily
- Santa Maria dell'Itria alla Kalsa, a church in the historic center of Palermo, Sicily
- Santa Maria Dell'Itria, known as La Pinta, a church in the ancient quarter of Albergaria (Palermo), Sicily
- Santa Maria dell'Itria, Ragusa, Sicily
