= Hamilton Psalter =

Medieval Byzantine illuminated manuscript

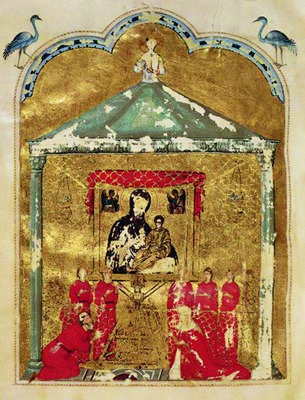

The Hamilton Psalter (Breviario Greco, with illuminations, 4to MS on velum [Ham. 119]) is an illustrated manuscript that consists of Psalms 1-150 and twelve canonical Odes. It is most notable among Byzantine manuscripts due to being one of the few surviving bilingual manuscripts from the Byzantine era, written primarily in Greek and Latin. There’s no sole author of the manuscript but it’s in fact a compilation of multiple scribes' writing. Its name is derived from being a part of the Hamilton Collection, arranged to be purchased from Alexander Hamilton, 10th Duke of Hamilton in 1882 by Wilhelm von Bode and Karl Friedrich Lippmann for the Royal Library in Berlin. It is currently housed within the Staatliche Museen Preussischer Kulturbesitz, Kupferstichkabinett Berlin.

== Patronage and Dating ==
The 10th Duke of Hamilton had acquired the manuscript at the beginning of the nineteenth century, when Northern Italy dispersed a larger number of books due to the secularization of churches during this era after the Napoleonic Wars.

The dating is somewhat ambiguous, jumping from multiple regions as well as eras where it is believed to have been conceived and housed but scholars have reason to believe its origin to be around 1300. The psalter was recorded by Holmes in 1789 to have been in the Dominican library of Santa Maria del Rosario in Venice, to where it had been inherited from Apostolo Zeno at his death in 1750. There has been attempts to trace the manuscript back further in time from a faded Latin inscription on fol. 38r, dated June, 1590. This date suggest that it had been kept in the West, most likely Italy during this time.

A verso of the inserted folio 1, the more famous of inscriptions within the manuscript, refers to Charlotte of Lusignan. Charlotte was an ascendant to the Cypriot throne in 1458 who died from being exiled in Rome during 1487. She had apparently been a bibliophile, much like the Duke of Hamilton, having given the Pope Innocent VIII numerous volumes, the Vatican Acts being among those given. Alfred Rahlfs was the first to connect the Hamilton's ex libris to the Vatican manuscript, raising a strong probability that the former manuscript came from Italy, along with other better recorded works. Charlotte had then fled Cyprus in 1474-75 allowing us to localize the Hamilton to Cyprus around the middle of the fifteenth century. This information, however, is greatly debated upon and only due to internal evidence is there any attempt in understanding when its earlier provenience and history lies.

== Appearance ==
Bound by a black textile sheath embossed with the Hamilton arms on both covers, measuring 27×23 cm, the Hamilton Psalter consists of 373 numbered and several interpolated parchment folios written in different hands that include a number of texts besides the bilingual Psalter. Greek and Latin, however, being seen the most prevalent within one folio, Greek left and Latin right. The parchment itself throughout the Hamilton is rather interesting as well, differing in hues and craftsmanship.

The French quires 1, 2, and 4 have been produced on very thin white material unique to this volume. Opposed to the Latin calendar written on much heavier, non-glossed, parchment that’s quite yellowed. These discrepancies found within the Psalter portion of the manuscript, help identify the French, Latin, and Greek texts within.

== Illustrations ==
Illuminated miniatures are certainly the most noteworthy feature within the Psalter, helping set it apart from the rest of the manuscript. Only slight coloration of red and blue initials appear in the Latin portion appended to the Psalter, the latter yields figural ornaments within its folds. Ornaments such as a series of eight half-page illuminations (fol. 40r-43v) illustrating the life of David as set forth in the supernumerary Psalm, a full-page donor portrait (fol. 39v), and an unframed, full-page, composition of Moses crossing the Red Sea precedes the first Ode (fol.243v).

Most notable from the collection of miniatures, is that of the Hodegetria (fol.39v). The Hamilton's version of the Virgin Mary is rather interesting due to the compositions unique representation of family. The illumination depicts the icon housed within a shrine behind a golden mesh screen. Beneath the Virgin, mounted on brackets risen from a four-sided pyramidal base, are attendants dressed in a red robe attire level with the bottom of the icons frame. These miniatures caused the psalter to be classified as being a part of the ‘monastic’ recension. Full page miniatures are grouped into rows and columns all composites of religious content and luxurious pigments. The Greek text within the psalter use archaizing script; a conscious act of imitation word, style of language, or art form that is old or old-fashioned.

An exhibition in 1975 by Berlin Museums, held by Stiftung Preußischer Kulturbesitz, showcased the contrast between the high quality of the frontispiece paintings and marginal miniatures reflecting Hans Belting’s treatment of Hamilton during his study of late Byzantine illumination of 1970.

== Text ==
The Greek portion of the text appear to have had three distinct hands involved, all working from a “liturgical” style that’s used in service books through the century. The liturgical script offers a challenge when attempting to date it due to its archaizing character; there are several works using colophons around 1300 that offers similar traits to those seen in the Hamilton Psalter. Scholars then date this particular type of script to be dated around the end of the thirteenth or very beginning of the fourteenth century. The date of around 1300 is then further corroborated by the Latin paleography, appearing to be created by a single copyist who drifts between older and newer letter form.
