= Santa Maria dell'Itria, Barrafranca =

Church in Barrafranca, Italy

The church of Maria Santissima dell'Itria is a Roman Catholic parish church in the town of Barrafranca, in the province of Enna, region of Sicily, Italy.

== History and description ==
A church at this site dates to circa 1598. Atop the facade are three arches that form a sail-like campanile. The church has a rich stucco decoration in the interior by Giuseppe Fantauzzo. He also created the bas-reliefs depicting the Madonnas of the Annunciation, Assumption, and Itria, as well as a St Francis of Paola and a Madonna of the Sacred Heart. Among the masterworks of the church are the altarpieces of the Annunciation (1613-1619) by Mattia Preti, a depiction of the Marian veneration of Santa Maria dell’Itria (prior to 1745), and a depiction of St Roch (prior to 1837) by Francesco Vaccaro. The baptismal font dates to 1681.
