= Chiesa Madre, Barrafranca =

Catholic church in Sicily, Italy

Coordinates: 37°22′24″N 14°12′06″E

The Chiesa Madre (or Mother Church) of Barrafranca, province of Enna, region of Sicily, Italy, is the main Roman Catholic church in the town. It is dedicated to Maria Santissima della Purificazione.

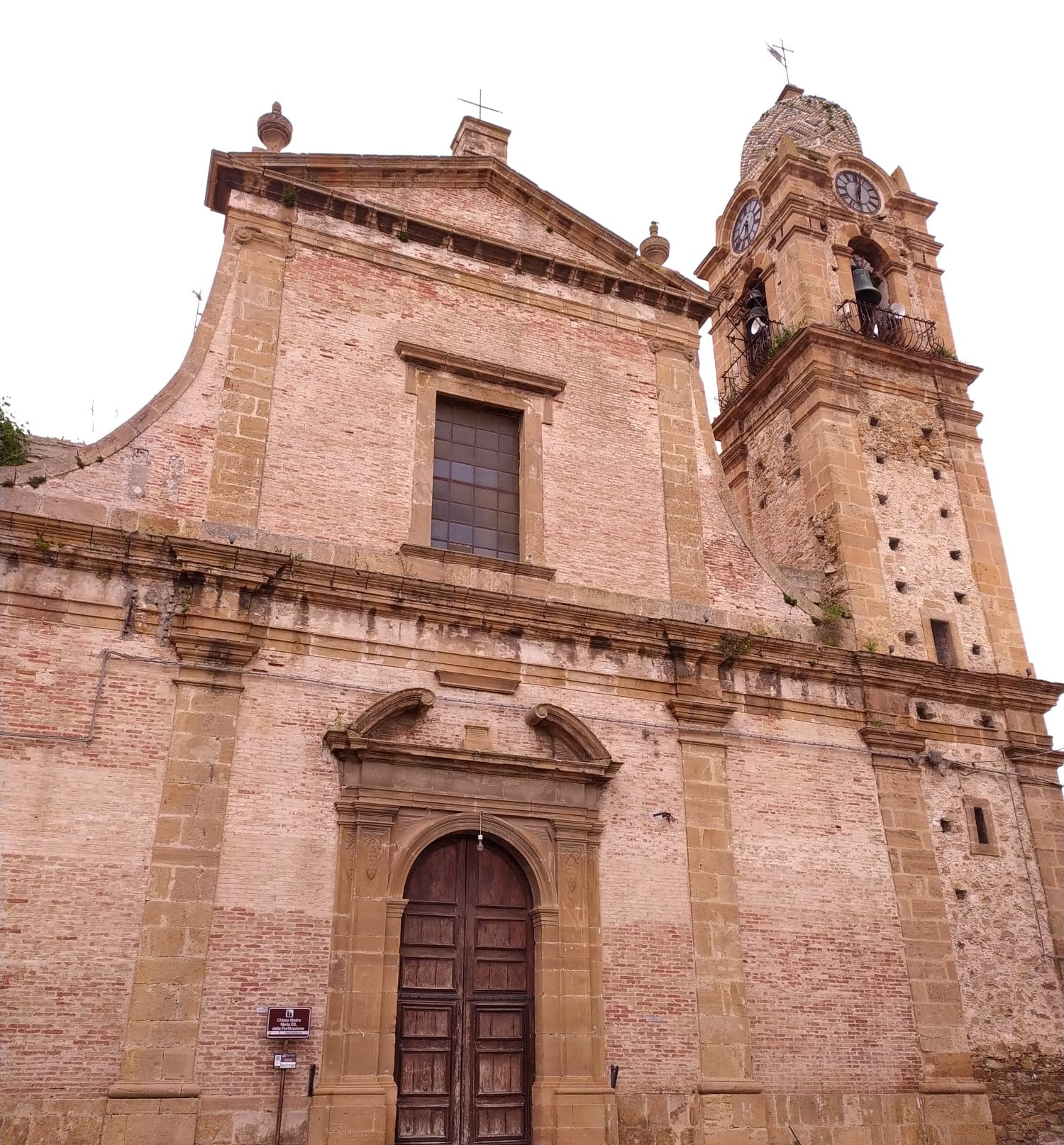
Facade and belltower of Chiesa Madre

== History and description ==
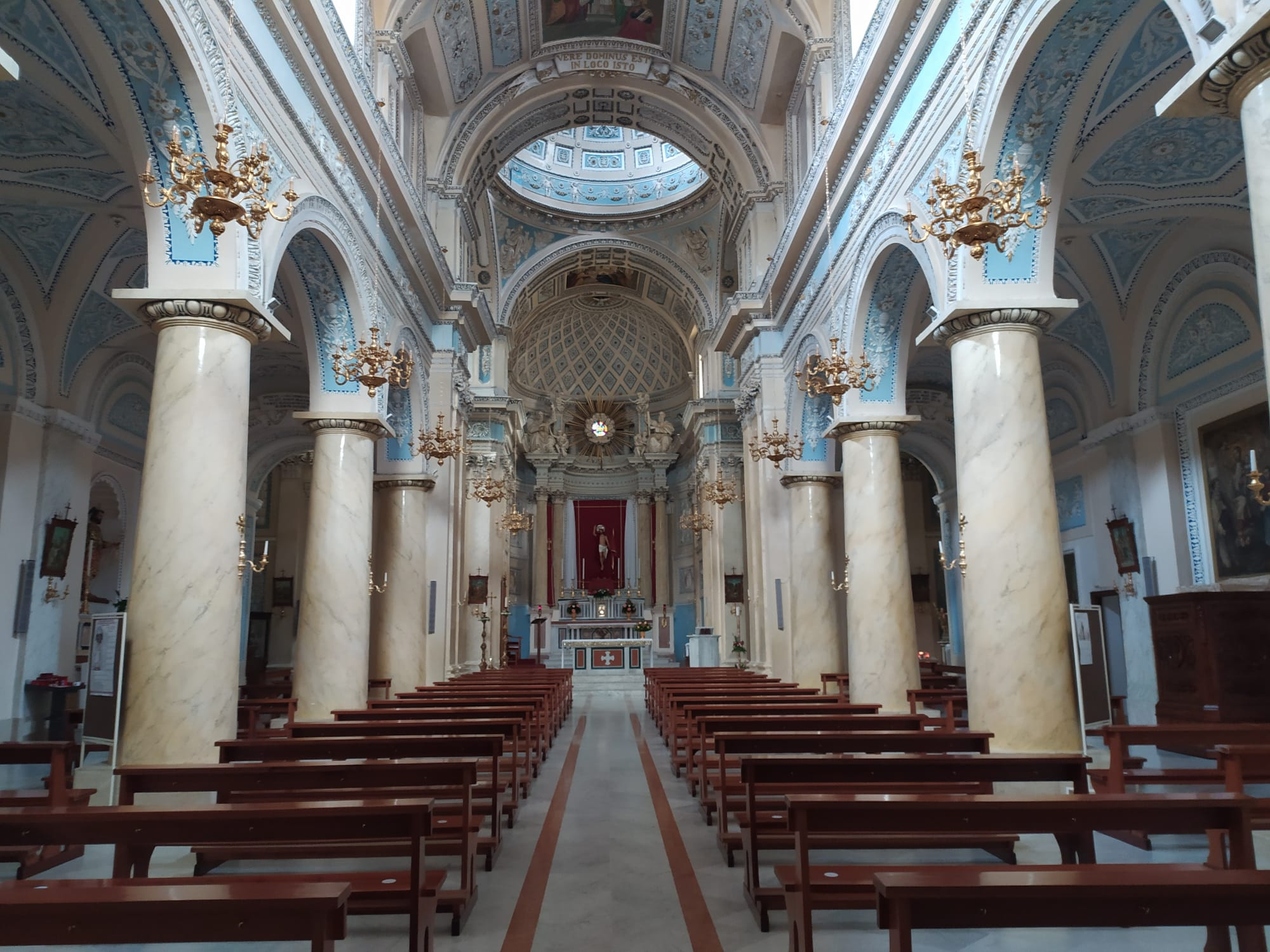
View of interior towards nave.

The present church replaced one dedicated to Saint Sebastian that had been built prior to 1622. The new church was begun in 1728 and the church was not in use until 1775. The brick and stone facade was not complete until 1830. The layout is that of a Latin cross with three naves and a dome at the crossing. The bell tower has some colorful ceramic tiles atop a small dome. The interior has a rich and colorful stucco decoration by the Signorelli brothers.

The interior houses a canvas depicting the Madonna of the Purification attributed to Filippo Paladino. A venerated crucifix from the church is used in town processions during Holy Week. Other altarpieces include a Virgin of the Mercy(1633), a Baptism of Jesus (1748); and a Virgin of the Consolation (1777); all by unknown artists. The baptismal font has a coat of arms of the Barresi family. The painting in the central nave were added after destruction of the roof in 1943, and painted by Emma and Puzzanghera.
