= Battle of Mazara del Vallo =

Battle of Mazara del Vallo (827)
- Part of the Muslim conquest of Sicily; Arab–Byzantine wars
- Location of Mazara del Vallo
Date	15 July 827
Location	Mazara del Vallo
Result	Aghlabid victory

Belligerents
Aghlabid dynasty	Byzantine Empire

Commanders and leaders
Asad ibn al-Furat	Balata

Strength
700 cavalry 10,000 infantry	150,000 men (Arab claim, exaggerated)

Casualties and losses
Unknown	Heavy

The Battle of Mazara was the first military engagement of the Muslim conquest of Sicily between the Aghlabids and the Byzantines near Mazara del Vallo. The battle ended in a decisive victory for the Aghlabids, which gave them a foothold in Sicily.

== Background ==
In the year 827, the Byzantine commander in Sicily, Euphemius, rebelled against the Byzantine imperial authority but was defeated and forced to seek refuge in Africa. The rulers of Africa at that time were the Aghlabid dynasty, whose seat was Kairouan. Euphemius asked the Aghlabid emir, Ziyadat Allah, for an army to help him against the Byzantines in exchange for paying tribute to the Aghlabids. The emir's council was in dispute; some argued to preserve the treaty with the Byzantines. The Muslim jurist, Asad ibn al-Furat, managed to convince the emir to launch an expedition, citing the holy duty for jihad and that the Byzantines had not released certain Muslim prisoners.

The emir appointed Asad as the leader of the expedition. The fleet of Euphemius waited in Sousse until the Aghlabid fleet arrived, and together they sailed towards Sicily on June 14th. The Aghlabid expedition was said to have 700 cavalry, 10,000 infantry, and 70-100 ships. Three days later they arrived and disembarked in Mazara del Vallo. During this time, the allies were inactive for several days, during which some Arabs skirmished with the rebels, thinking they were the enemy. Asad told Euphemius that he no longer needed his help and should take no part in any future engagements, thus showing his true intentions to conquer the island.

== Battle ==
The Arabs in Mazara heard the approach of a large Byzantine army under a man named Balata, which outnumbered them. The Aghlabids quickly left Mazara in July to confront them and began forming battle formations. While waiting for the Byzantines, Asad cited verses from the Quran and began exhorting his men to fight. Arab sources state the Byzantine army had a force of 150,000 men, which is clearly an exaggeration. The following battle, which began on 15 July, was fierce and bloody. The large number of Byzantines was futile against the desperate Arabs, well aware that they had no refuge in case of defeat. The Arab cavalry, led by Asad himself, charged against the Byzantines, which broke their lines and routed them in every direction. The victory was complete, a large amount of booty was acquired, and a great number of prisoners were sent to Africa. Balata fled the battle and took refuge in Castrogiovanni.

== Aftermath ==
The battle at Mazara was a decisive victory for the Aghlabids. After this success, Asad, leaving Abu-Zaki of the Kinana tribe as governor in Mazara, set out in the direction of Syracuse; he was thus to cross the entire island from west to east. Euphemus felt betrayed and began urging the Byzantine authorities in Sicily to resist the Arabs.

== Sources ==
- Bury, J. B. (2019). History of the Eastern Roman Empire, From the Fall of Irene to the Accession of Basil I.
- Scott, S. P. (1904). History of the Moorish Empire in Europe, Vol II. p. 11.
- Vasiliev, Alexander A. (1935). Byzantium and the Arabs. Volume I, The Amorium dynasty (820–867) (in French). p. 74.
- Amari, Michele (1854). Storia dei Musulmani di Sicilia, Vol I. (in Italian). p. 266.
