= Barrafranca =

- Comune
- Comune di Barrafranca
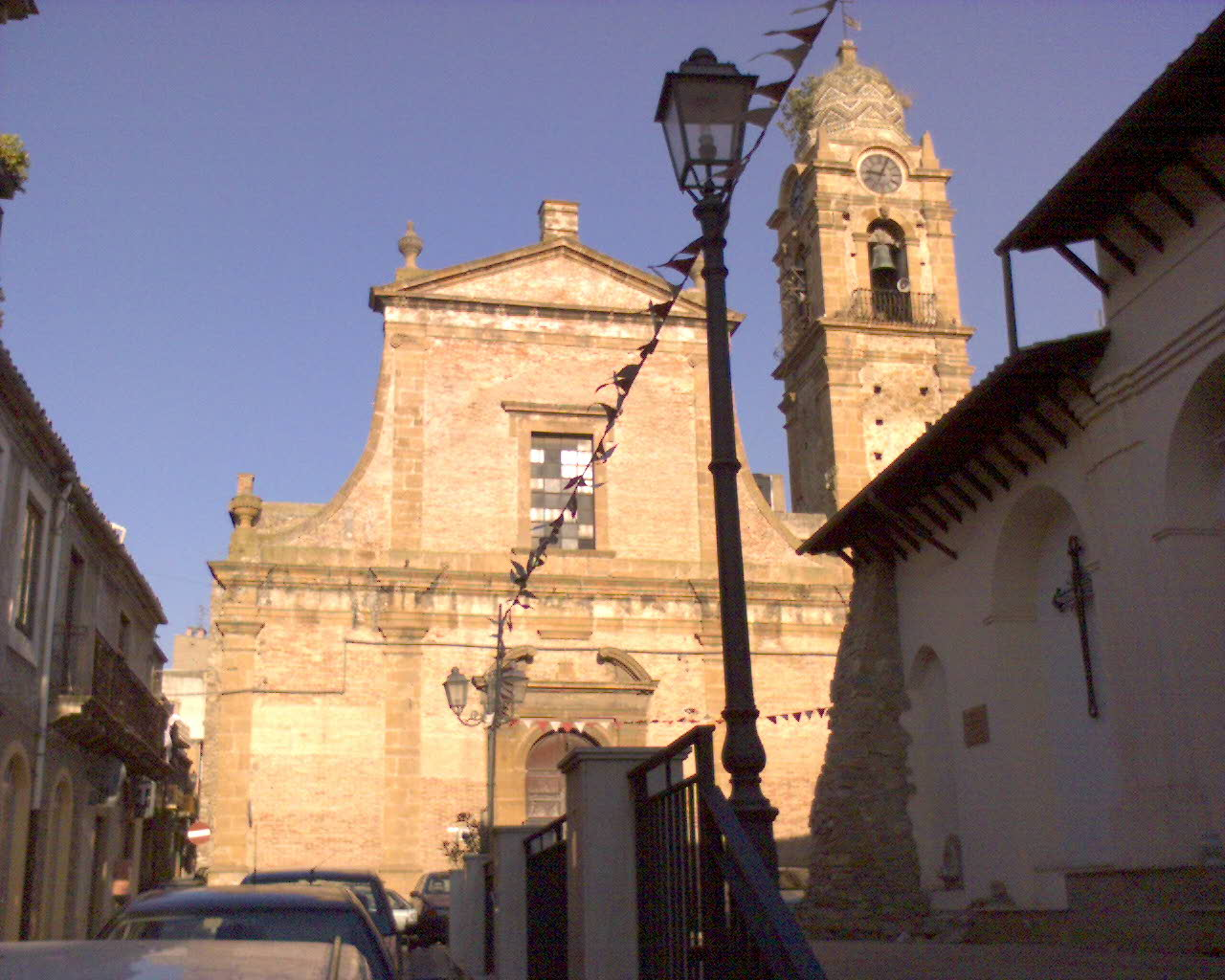
- Chiesa Madre Barrafranca

- Location within Italy Location within Sicily
- Coordinates: 37°22′N 14°12′E
- Country: Italy
- Region: Sicily
- Province: Enna (EN)

Government
  - Mayor: Fabio Accardi

Area
  - Total: 53.71 km^{2} (20.74 sq mi)
- Elevation: 450 m (1,480 ft)

Population (2026)
  - Total: 11,456
  - Density: 213.3/km^{2} (552.4/sq mi)
- Demonym: Barresi
- Time zone: UTC+1 (CET)
  - Summer (DST): UTC+2 (CEST)
- Postal code: 94012
- Dialing code: 0934
- Patron saint: Saint Alexander I
- Saint day: May 3
- Website: Official website

Barrafranca (Latin: Convicinum, Calloniana) is a town and comune (municipality) in the province of Enna in the autonomous island region of Sicily in Italy. It has 11,456 inhabitants.

== History ==
A Roman fortification known as Calloniana, in 1529 it was founded by Pietro Barresi, Prince of Pietraperzia, and took the current name from the Barresi family. Pietro was the first Marquis of Barrafranca. His sister married Conrado Branciforte, count of Mazzarino, whose family took possession of the town.

== Demographics ==
As of 2026, the population is 11,456, of which 47.2% are male, and 52.8% are female. Minors make up 15.1% of the population, and seniors make up 25.1%.

Historical population

Year	Pop.	±%
1861	8,838	—
1871	8,418	−4.8%
1881	9,155	+8.8%
1901	11,068	+20.9%
1911	12,296	+11.1%
1921	12,472	+1.4%
1931	12,988	+4.1%
1936	13,111	+0.9%

Year	Pop.	±%
1951	14,665	+11.9%
1961	14,775	+0.8%
1971	14,447	−2.2%
1981	15,511	+7.4%
1991	13,667	−11.9%
2001	13,115	−4.0%
2011	13,977	+6.6%
2021	12,000	−14.1%

Source: ISTAT

=== Immigration ===
As of 2025, immigrants make up 8.6% of the total population. The 5 largest foreign countries of birth are Germany, Romania, France, United Kingdom, and Switzerland.

== Sights ==
Sights include the Duomo of Barrafranca (18th century, in late Sicilian Baroque style ) with a painting attributed to Filippo Paladino, and the Benedictine Monastery, another example of late Baroque architecture. The church of Santa Maria dell'Itria houses an Annunciation painted by Mattia Preti. Finally, the church of Maria Santissima della Stella also has interior artworks.
