= Francesco Vaccaro (painter) =

Italian Baroque painter and engraver (1636–1675)

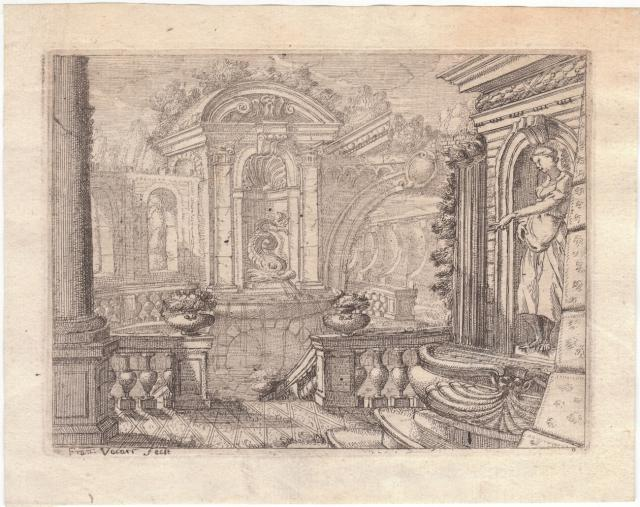
Architectural Capriccio with a Fountain by Francesco Vaccaro, British Museum

Francesco Vaccaro also known as Vaccari, Vacari (24 September 1636 – 13 December 1675) was an Italian painter and engraver of the Baroque period, who trained in his native Bologna under Francesco Albani . He was chiefly known as a painter, from his landscape and architectural views.

He published a treatise entitled Views and Perspectives of Ruins, Fountains and Buildings of Italy, embellished with twelve copper plates. Two copies of this treatise are kept at the Repossi Art Gallery in Chiari, in the province of Brescia, while four others are in the British Museum, London.

Vaccaro's work as a painter mainly involved decorating noble palaces in his hometown and neighbouring cities: the art historian Carlo Cesare Malvasia (1616-1693) noted in his work Felsina Pittrice (1678) that Vaccaro had painted "the frescoes in chiaroscuro colours in the chapel of S. Apollonia, in the church of the saints Vitale and Agricola; [...] and in the Vizzani palace he painted two rooms, [...] two rooms in the Palazzo de Ratta. Then he added that 'in the Palazzo de'Fontana di San Mamolo he painted a whole gallery up to the ground with various puttini and architectures' but that he himself went to see the work to describe it in his book and found it to be 'in modern use, all covered in white'. It had therefore already been destroyed by the owners of the building and covered with white plaster.

Also according to Malvasia, towards the year 1670 Vaccaro secretly left Bologna, so that he would not have to testify about a murder committed by one of his acquaintances.

== Bibliography ==
- Bryan, Michael (1889). Walter Armstrong; Robert Edmund Graves (eds.). Dictionary of Painters and Engravers, Biographical and Critical. Vol. II L-Z. London: George Bell and Sons. p. 602.
