= Syracuse, Sicily =

City in Sicily, Italy

Syracuse Siracusa (Italian) Saragusa (Sicilian)
- Comune
- Comune di Siracusa
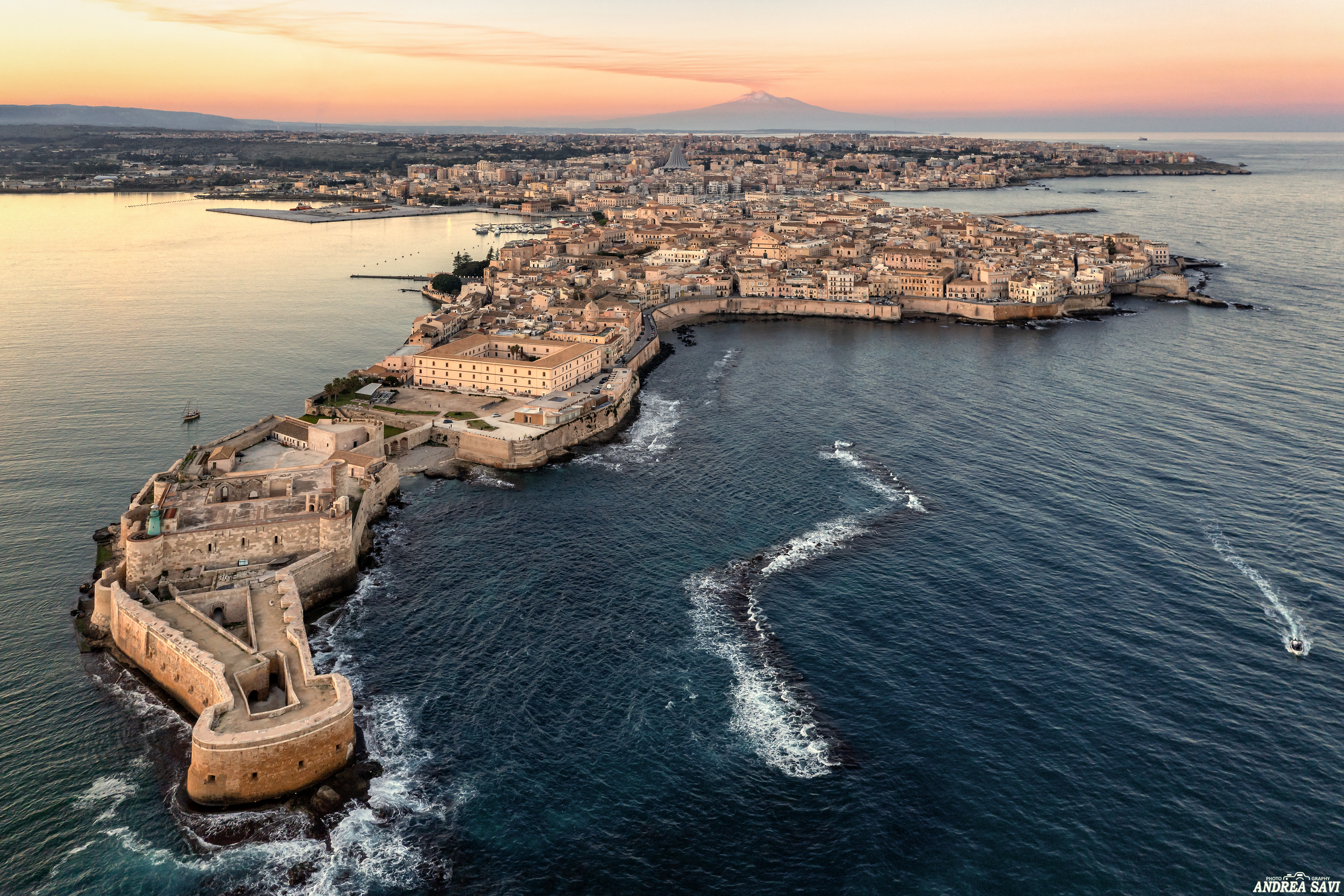
- Ortygia island, where Syracuse was founded in ancient Greek times, with Mount Etna visible in the distance

- Flag Coat of arms

- Location within Italy Location within Sicily
- Coordinates: 37°04′09″N 15°17′15″E
- Country: Italy
- Region: Sicily
- Province: Syracuse (SR)
- Frazioni: Arenella, Belvedere, Carrozziere, Cassibile, Fanusa, Fontane Bianche, Isola, Ognina, Plemmirio, Punta Milocca, Terrauzza

Government
  - Mayor: Francesco Italia

Area
  - Total: 207.78 km^{2} (80.22 sq mi)
- Elevation: 17 m (56 ft)

Population (2026)
  - Total: 115,515
  - Density: 555.95/km^{2} (1,439.9/sq mi)
- Demonym(s): Syracusan, Syracusian (en); Siracusano (it)
- Time zone: UTC+1 (CET)
  - Summer (DST): UTC+2 (CEST)
- Postal code: 96100
- Dialing code: 0931
- Patron saint: Saint Lucy
- Saint day: 13 December
- Website: comune.siracusa.it

Syracuse (/ˈsaɪrəkjuːs, -kjuːz/ SY-rə-kewss, -kewz; Italian: Siracusa [siraˈkuːza]; Sicilian: Saragusa [saɾaˈuːsa]) (Note: Latin: Syrācūsae, IPA: [sʏraːˈkuːsae̯]; Attic Greek: Συράκουσαι, romanized: Syrákousai, IPA: [syrǎːkuːsai̯]; Doric Greek: Συράκοσαι, romanized: Syrā́kosai, IPA: [syraːkósai̯]; Medieval Greek: Συρακοῦσαι, romanized: Syrakoûsai, IPA: [syraˈkuse]; Modern Greek: Συρακούσες, romanized: Syrakoúses, IPA: [siraˈkuses].) is a city and comune (municipality) located in the autonomous island region of Sicily in Southern Italy, and the capital of the free municipal consortium of the same name. As of 2026, with a population of 115,515, it is the 4th-largest city in Sicily, following Palermo, Catania, and Messina.

Situated on the southeastern coast of the island, Syracuse boasts a millennia-long history: counted among the largest metropolises of the classical age, it rivaled Athens in power and splendor, and Athens unsuccessfully attempted to subjugate it. It was the birthplace of the mathematician Archimedes, who led its defense during the Roman siege in 212 BC. Syracuse became the de facto capital of the Byzantine Empire under Constans II from 663 to 668. For centuries, it served as the capital of Sicily, until the 877–878 siege during the Aghlabid conquest of Sicily, which led to its decline in favor of Palermo. It became a Norman county within the Kingdom of Sicily after the Norman conquest of Sicily in the second half of the 1000s.

During the Spanish era, it transformed into a fortress, with its historic center, Ortygia, adopting its current Baroque appearance following reconstruction after the devastating 1693 earthquake. During World War II, in 1943, the armistice that ended hostilities between the Kingdom of Italy and the Anglo-American allies was signed southwest of Syracuse, in contrada Santa Teresa Longarini, which is historically known as the Armistice of Cassibile.

Renowned for its vast historical, architectural, and scenic wealth, Syracuse was designated by UNESCO in 2005, together with the Necropolis of Pantalica, as a World Heritage Site.

== Etymology ==
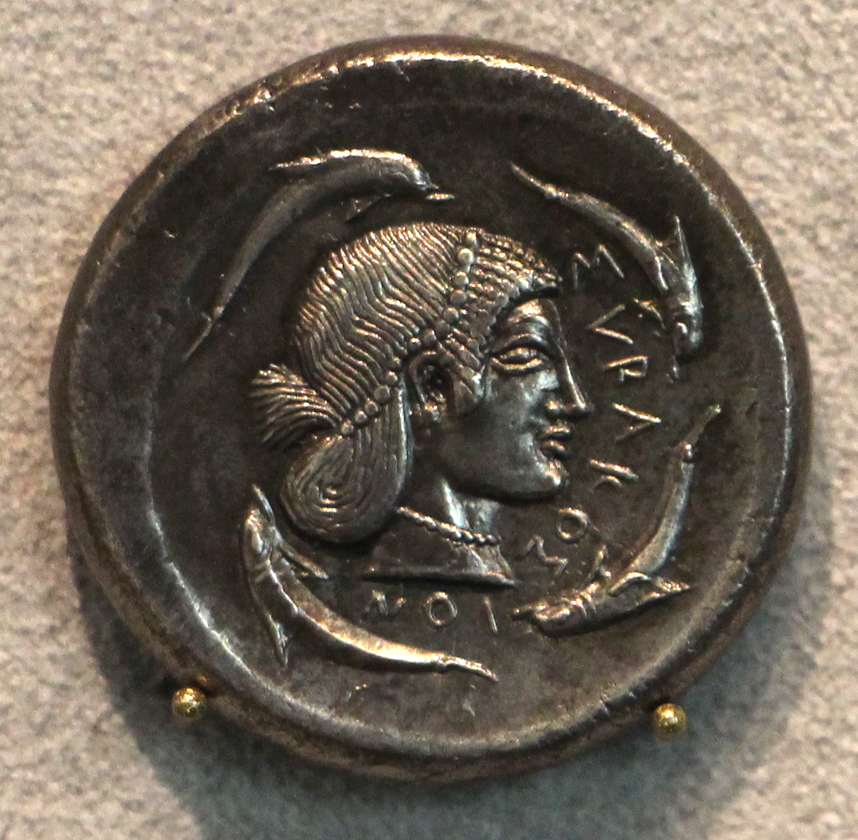
Coin with the inscription ΣΥRAKOΣION ("of the Syracusans"), 5th century BC

The origins of Syracuse's name are highly uncertain. The toponym first appears on the city's ancient coinage in the 6th century BC. Among the most notable hypotheses are derivations:

- From the Siculian language, via the hydronym of the marsh Syrako or Syraka, meaning "abundance of water";
- From the Proto-Indo-European word Sur-aku: "saltwater";
- From a Semitic language, Sor-Cosia or Suloq, with various possible meanings: "East," "salty," or "sirocco".

== History ==
=== Ancient Syracuse ===
Excavations in the area have established that the region where Syracuse arose was inhabited continuously from the Neolithic period: the so-called "Stentinello culture," named after the coastal site north of Syracuse, is particularly significant, with artifacts dating back to 6000 BC.

The city of Syrakousai was founded by the Corinthians in 733 BC (according to the Thucydidean dating). The leader of the new colonists was the oekist Archias, and their landing place was the island of Ortygia, from which they expelled the Sicels, the previous inhabitants of the area.

The new Corinthian colony grew rapidly and subjugated nearby territories. Throughout its centuries-long Greek history, Syracuse had a long line of tyrants and brief periods of popular rule, mostly under oligarchy. Among the numerous men who governed the polis, six stood out in the ancient world for their ingenuity, fame, and power: Gelon, Hiero I, Dionysius I, Agathocles, and Hiero II, alongside the moderate oligarchic rule of the Corinthian general Timoleon, which lasted about a decade. These leaders dominated much of Sicily, extending Syracusan presence within the Magna Graecia, and influenced the broader Mediterranean, colonizing and establishing strategic commercial outposts (such as the work of the Dionysii in the Adriatic) or subjugating cities they encountered to thwart enemies (e.g., Agathocles with his expedition to Africa).

Syracuse was the main rival of the Phoenician capital, Carthage, which, occupying the western part of the island (called the Punic eparchy), gave rise to the Greco-Punic Wars. These two influential metropolises, through a series of peace treaties and renewed battles, fiercely shaped the entire history of Greek Sicily.

In addition to internal conflicts with other Siceliot poleis and Barbarians (e.g., the war against Akragas and the conflict against the Syntèleia of Ducetius, king of the Sicels), Syrakousai faced an ambitious external offensive from Athens: the Attic capital launched a massive expedition to Sicily during the Peloponnesian War, aiming to conquer the renowned coastal city, whose expansionist policies threatened Athenian interests in the West. During this conflict, the Syracusan general Hermocrates distinguished himself, later leading Syracusan soldiers to Asia Minor alongside Sparta in the final phase of the same war.

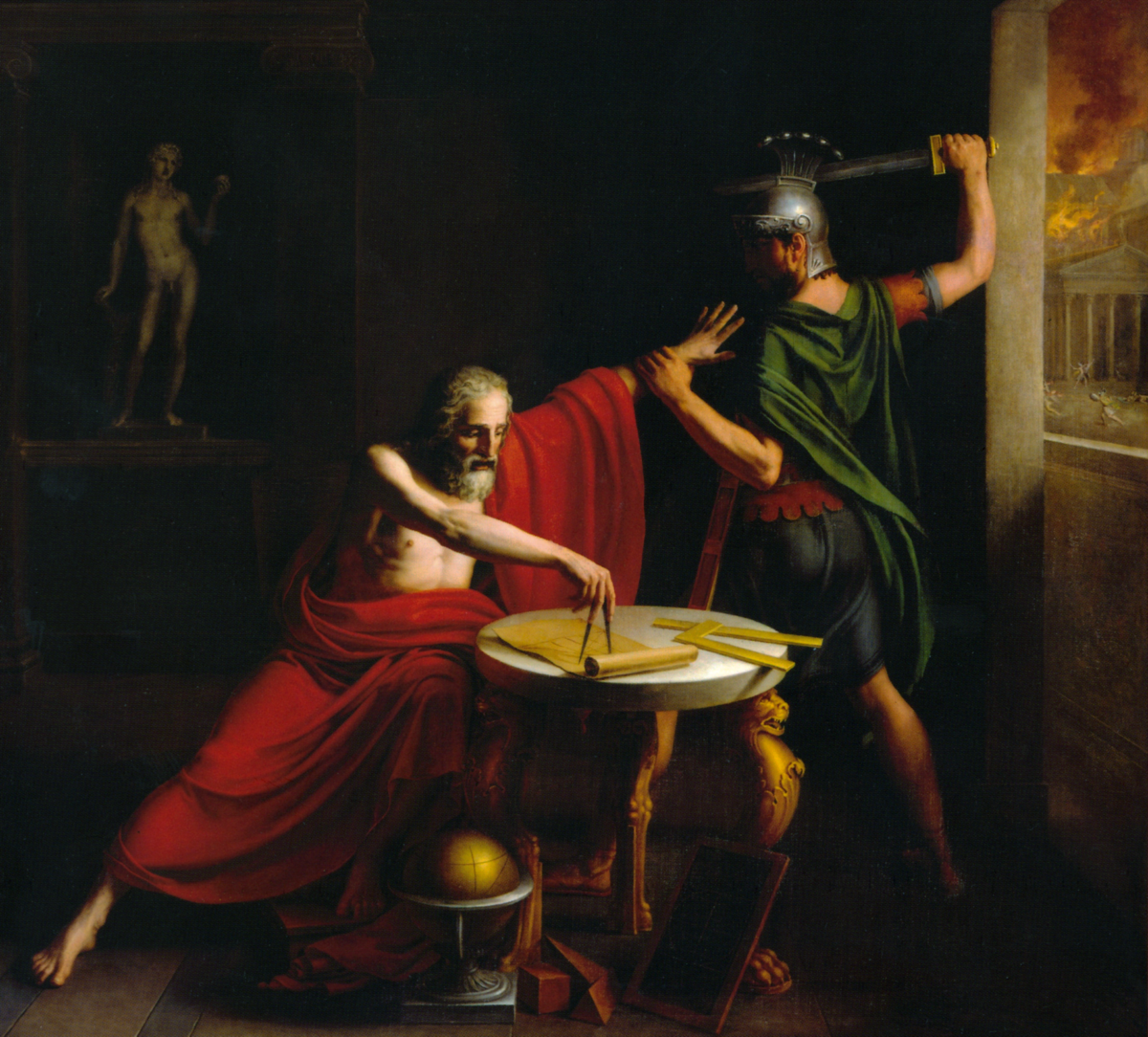
Archimedes drawing his circles as a Roman soldier prepares to strike him (from the famous account of the scientist's death, work by Thomas Degeorge, 19th century)

The Syracusan court was a hub of patronage, hosting some of the most renowned names of the Greek world, including Aeschylus, Pindar, Ibycus, Xenophon, and Plato; the latter not only stayed in the pentapolis but, according to tradition, was deeply involved in Syracusan political history, making several journeys and becoming a confidant of Dion, the main political adversary of the tyrant Dionysius II. Syracuse was the birthplace of numerous figures who contributed to the arts, philosophy, and science. Among the natives, Archimedes stands out: a mathematician, inventor, and scientist who led Syracuse during the Roman siege in 212 BC.

After prolonged resistance, Roman legions entered the city, leading to its capitulation under the consul Marcus Claudius Marcellus. In the heat of the conquest, a Roman soldier killed Archimedes. All of Syracuse's wealth, accumulated over centuries of hegemony and prosperity, was looted and transported to Rome. This marked a significant turning point in Mediterranean culture. However, despite losing its autonomy, Syracusae remained the main center of the island during the entire Roman era. The Syracusan province was established, and the city was designated the capital of Roman Sicily. Cicero, arriving in the 1st century BC, described it as "the most beautiful and largest Greek city" (In Verrem, II, 4, 117), and the emperor Augustus, in the same period, sent a colony of Roman citizens to aid its repopulation.

With the advent of Christianity, extensive catacombs emerged in the city. The apostolic message arrived early, as the Syracusan port was central to the maritime routes of the Roman Empire, traveled by early missionaries. Tradition holds that the protobishop of Syracuse was Marcian from Antioch, sent by the apostle Peter.

The Acts of the Apostles record that in 61, the apostle Paul of Tarsus stayed in the city for three days. During the reign of Diocletian, on 13 December 304, the martyrdom of Lucy of Syracuse occurred.

=== Medieval era ===
With the Barbarian invasions, the Western Roman Empire declined, and in the 5th century, Syracuse became part of the Eastern Roman Empire (later known as the Byzantine Empire). By the political design of Constans II, Syracuse became the capital of the Eastern Empire, replacing Constantinople, from 663 to 668, until the emperor's assassination in a location in the city called "the Daphne Baths". From the 7th century, Syracuse was targeted by Arabs, with attacks intensifying in the 9th century: after repelling a first siege in 827, the city fell violently during the second siege, concluded on 21 May 878.

The Islamic period in Syracuse is shrouded in silence from ancient sources, particularly the early years following the brutal conquest. A damnatio memoriae contributed to the absence of Arab architectural evidence in the city. Despite the near-total destruction, Syracuse was soon reintegrated into the island's social circuits (by the Norman period, it was referenced as a focal point for trade (Note: Muhammad al-Idrisi, Nuzhat al-Mushtaq: Syracuse is among the most famous cities and noblest lands. Citizens and outsiders from all directions ride toward it; merchants and travelers from all regions head to it. It lies on the sea, which surrounds it on all sides except for a northern gate for entry and exit. It would be superfluous to describe this famous place at length […].) (Note: From the Arab-Norman period, the testimony of Hugo Falcandus, who in the 12th century called Syracuse "optima et pulcherrima parte Sicilie")).

In 1040, the Byzantine emperor Michael IV sent general George Maniakes to Syracuse to reconquer the Aretusean land. His main companions were Italic and Norman warriors, led by Harald Hardrada, William Iron Arm, Drogo of Hauteville, Arduin the Lombard, and Stephen the Caulker, the emperor's brother-in-law, who commanded the fleet. The city was conquered by them. However, after numerous victories, serious internal discord arose within Maniakes' army, forcing him to abandon Sicily. The Normans turned against the Byzantines, and the new balance led to a swift Muslim resumption of control over Syracuse.

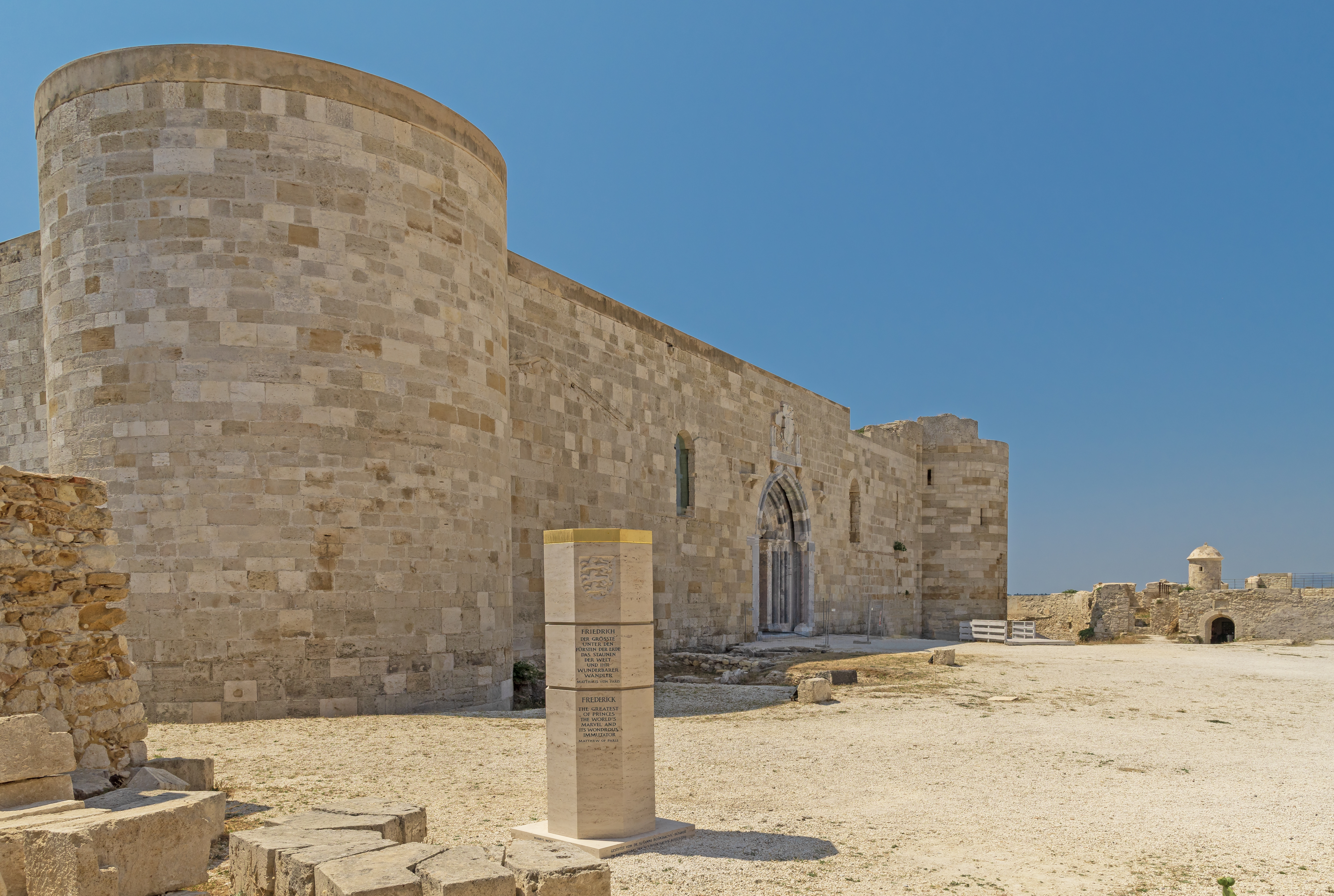
In the foreground, the totem recalling the Hohenstaufen origin of the Maniace Castle (built by Frederick II in 1240 and named in memory of the Byzantine general George Maniakes)

The city was definitively wrested from the Arabs in 1085, following a naval battle in the Great Harbor, where the last Arab emir of Syracuse, Benavert, clashed with the Norman Robert Guiscard.

The new political order established by the Normans did not restore Syracuse's ancient role as Sicily's capital (as initiated by the Arabs, they maintained the capital in Palermo).

With the arrival of the Nordic people, the Syracusans formed a county; the first established on the island, governed by its own count in the figure of Jordan of Hauteville, nephew of Roger I of Sicily, who became the Great Count of Sicily.

In the 12th century, Syracuse was contested by the maritime republics of Genoa and Pisa, both aiming to establish themselves there and include it among their fiefs. In 1204, Syracuse even had a Genoese count as its feudal lord: the pirate Alamanno da Costa, who took the title of Count of Syracuse "by the Grace of God, the King of Sicily, and the Republic of Genoa" (Genoa claimed rights over Syracuse, as the city was allegedly promised to them by the Hohenstaufen dynast Frederick Barbarossa in exchange for personal favors, a promise later renewed by his son, Henry VI). However, Barbarossa's grandson, Frederick II, King of Sicily and Emperor of the Holy Roman Empire, decided to bring Syracuse under the direct control of the Sicilian government, removing it from feudal disputes and declaring it in 1234 his "urbs fidelissima" (most faithful city; an epithet it retained in documents until the modern era).

During the Sicilian Vespers, Syracuse declared itself a free commune; an institution that ceased with the arrival of the Aragonese to the island's government. In 1302, the city became the seat of the queens of the Kingdom of Sicily and was governed for a long time through the Queen's Chamber, which granted the Syracusans significant autonomy, "like a state within a state," while their ultimate allegiance remained to the holder of the Sicilian crown.

The first queen of the Syracusans was Eleanor of Anjou, the last being the infanta of Navarre Germaine of Foix, granddaughter of King of France Louis XII and consort of Ferdinand II of Aragon.

=== Modern era ===
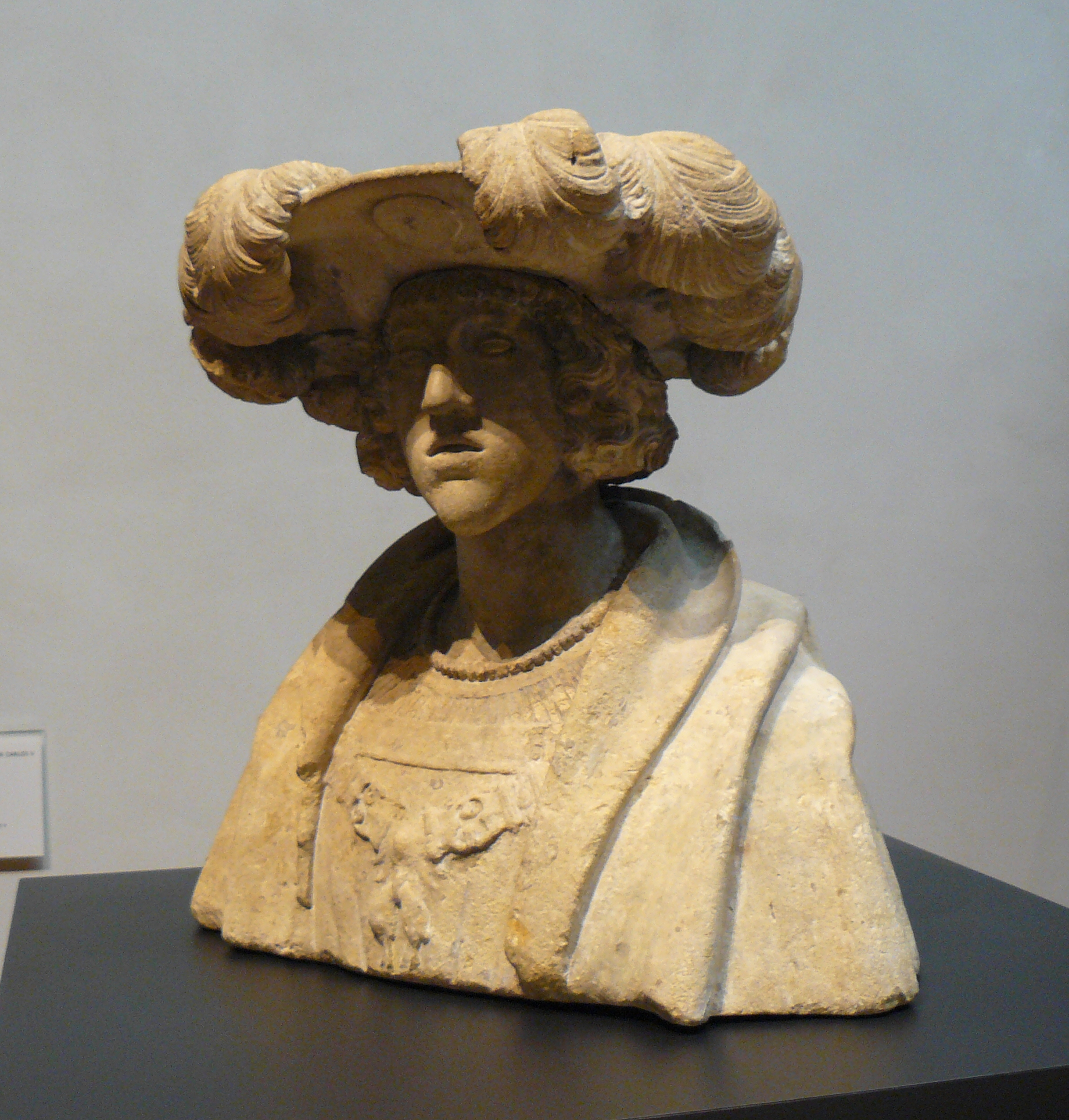
Bust of Charles V in the 1520s (National Sculpture Museum, Spain, Valladolid)

Thanks to the deep emotional bond between Germaine of Foix and the first ruler of the Spanish Empire, Charles V of Habsburg, Syracuse had a particularly close relationship with this monarch, reflected in the extensive documentation of his deeds across various aspects of Syracusan history. The era of Charles V was marked by war against the Ottoman Empire. As a borderland between the western and eastern Mediterranean, Syracuse became a key stronghold for defending Spanish imperial borders. Charles V fortified it so robustly that it earned the title of fortress.

It was also the work of Spanish soldiers under Charles V that transformed Ortygia into an island by cutting the isthmus built by the Greeks about a thousand years earlier, restoring Ortygia to its original geographical form.

In 1529, the Order of the Knights Hospitaller moved to Syracuse: sources are divided on whether it was Charles V who directed them to the Syracusan area to keep Turkish fleets and Barbary pirates at bay, or whether it was the initiative of the Grand Master Philippe Villiers de L'Isle-Adam. The wandering knights, homeless after losing the island of Rhodes, remained in Syracuse for a year until, in April 1530, they received documents from Charles V, as King of Sicily, granting them the Maltese archipelago as a fief for their Order; in return, the Habsburg demanded loyalty to the Sicilian monarch. The knights accepted.

Syracuse thus became a witness to the birth of the Knights Hospitaller (due to the proximity between the two islands, the knights established a close, albeit occasionally contentious, relationship with the Syracusans (Note: Although the knights frequently defended Syracuse's coasts, there were instances of conflict between the Order of Malta and Syracuse's politicians, clergy, and military; examples include the crisis of 1531, caused by the price of Syracusan wine, the crisis of 1637, sparked by the bombardment of the Order's galleys by the city's military, and the crisis of 1687, caused by the prohibition by Syracusans of the Order's galleys landing at Augusta.)).

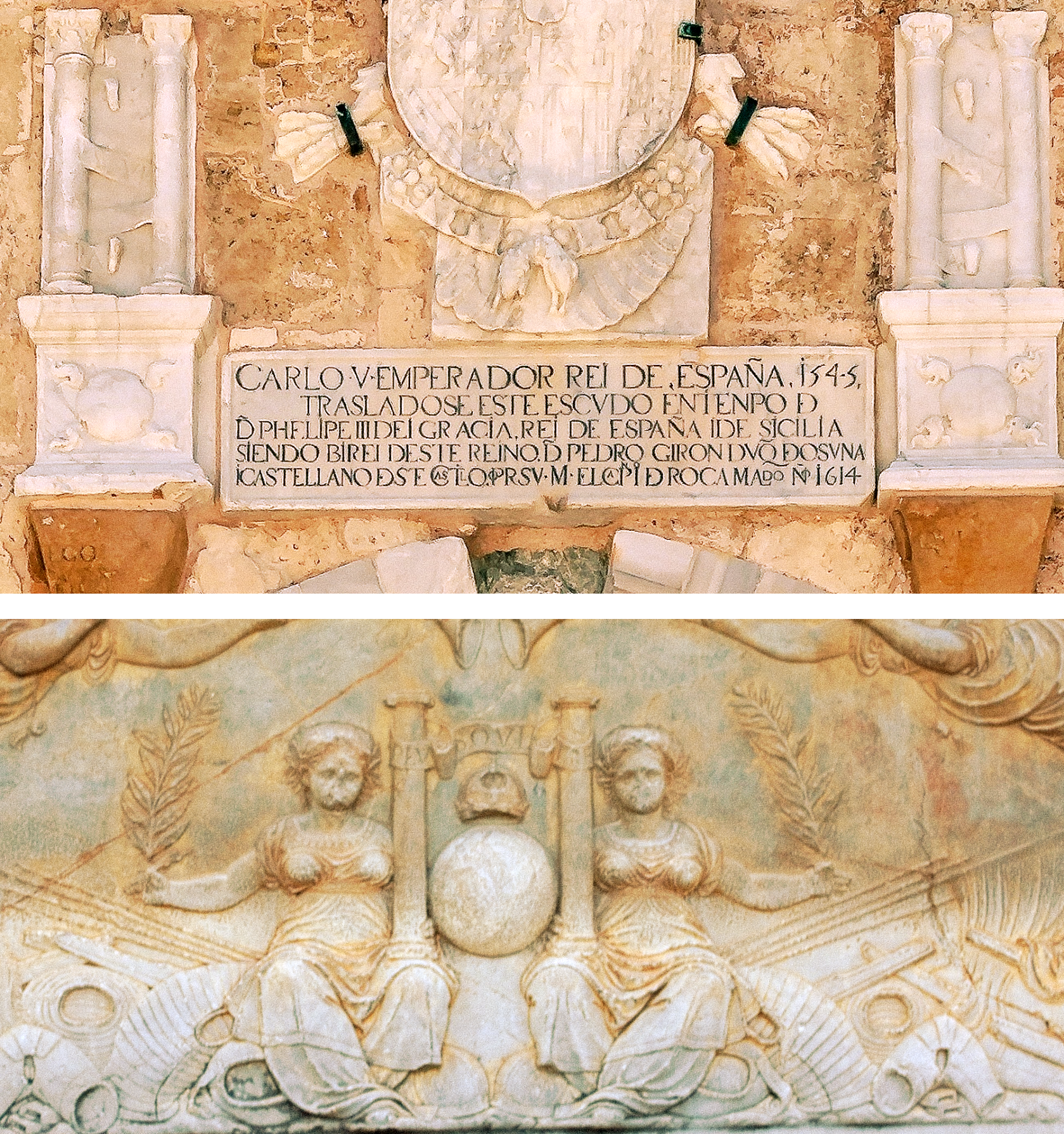
Top: The Pillars of Hercules with the motto Plus Ultra and the terrestrial globe; the personal symbols of Charles V—adopted following the discovery of the Americas—still adorn the entrance to Syracuse's Maniace Castle (the plaque was commissioned by him in 1542). Bottom: The same symbols at the Palace of Charles V

The 16th century was a century of major natural disasters for Syracuse: the most destructive event was the 1542 earthquake, which nearly obliterated the city. Famines and epidemics decimated the population (just decades before the earthquake, there was even anticipation of an apocalypse). Even Charles V, during the height of religious fervor (with the Spanish Inquisition active in Sicily), became convinced that unknown sinners, having provoked the "wrath of Heaven" (as the Syracusans claimed), had brought the calamity upon the city.

Wars and calamities continued at a relentless pace throughout the following century. Syracuse could no longer keep up with the demographic growth of other major Sicilian centers (while the population increased across most of the island, Syracuse's population steadily declined). (Note: The 1542 earthquake was decisive in delivering a final blow to an already struggling social fabric.)

In the Spanish era, Syracuse was primarily known as Zaragoza de Sicilia (or Çaragoça de Sicilia): from the outset of their presence on the island, the Spanish referred to it as the Aragonese capital Zaragoza, and in official documents, it was always distinguished as the Zaragoza of Sicily.

Among the major military events of the period, particularly significant for Syracuse were: the attempted invasion by Sultan Suleiman the Magnificent (as a response to the Muslim defeat at the Battle of Lepanto), the defeat of the Knights of Malta at Plemmirio, and the war of the Sun King, Louis XIV of France (within the 17th century Franco-Dutch War), which particularly affected the Spanish domains in the Syracusan area; during this last conflict, the Dutch admiral Michiel de Ruyter died and was buried in Syracuse (his body was later reclaimed by the Dutch in Amsterdam).

In 1693, another destructive earthquake, accompanied by a tsunami, struck, affecting most of eastern Sicily. Syracuse suffered less damage than in the 1542 event but was still severely weakened. In 1700, with the premature death of Charles II of Spain, a fierce contest arose to determine the new ruler of the Spanish Empire. The War of the Spanish Succession fully involved Syracuse, as Sicily became a contested territory following the Treaty of Utrecht, through which the Duchy of Savoy was united with the Kingdom of Sicily, and Spain lost control of the latter.

Spain, under Philip V, had no intention of relinquishing the island and defied European expectations by waging war to free Sicily from the Piedmontese and restore Iberian influence. In this context, Syracuse became a Savoyard fortress where Annibale Maffei, viceroy of Victor Amadeus II, took refuge while the Spanish army had already conquered most of the island. For the first time, the British army intervened in the Aretusean land, as George I of Great Britain aimed to prevent Spain from reclaiming its former domains.

The battle of 11 August 1718 between the Spanish and the English, which saw the latter's victory in Syracusan waters, marked a significant turning point: it ended relations with the Iberian Peninsula and initiated a sustained British presence in the territory.

After separation from Piedmont and a brief, turbulent Austrian period, lasting about fifteen years, Syracuse became part of the domains of the Bourbons of Naples. In 1798, Napoleon Bonaparte ended a long period of peace by claiming France's control over the island of Malta and expelling the knights, some of whom sought aid from the Tsar of Russia, Paul I. This sparked a dispute over the Maltese archipelago, extending to the Syracusans, as Bonaparte was not averse to conquering Sicily. The Aretusean city first welcomed the British fleet of Horatio Nelson (famous for his statement about the water of the Fountain of Arethusa, which he credited for his victory over Bonaparte in Egypt) and later that of Cuthbert Collingwood, Nelson's successor as commander of the Mediterranean Fleet, who requested full naval control of Syracuse for British soldiers. British land and sea forces garrisoned the city throughout the Napoleonic Wars, leaving it exposed only after 1813 (the Napoleonic period forged a strong bond with England, such that it destabilized Syracuse's political stability).

Notably, during the same period, Syracuse hosted the United States fleet, which remained in its port from 1803 to 1807 during the First Barbary War. The Americans, however, left the city due to strained relations with British soldiers (the memory of the American Revolutionary War was still vivid, and Britain, preparing to militarily occupy Syracuse to prevent French conquest, did not want additional armed forces present). (Note: The United States would again request in 1848 to make Syracuse their main Mediterranean base, but the provisional Sicilian government denied authorization.)

The Kingdom of the Two Sicilies, established in 1816, faced a profound crisis from the 1820s, as Sicily never accepted the union of its crown with Naples, resulting in a loss of autonomy. Syracuse joined the rebellion in the 1840s: the turning point, which eroded trust in the Bourbon government in one fell swoop, was the health crisis of 1837, when a cholera epidemic devastated the city. Revolts erupted, leading to irreconcilable conflicts between the Syracusans and Bourbon authority: Ferdinand II resorted to military force to regain control, with the armed forces enacting harsh reprisals against the population. The king then stripped the city of its status as a provincial capital, creating the Province of Noto. Thus, the Syracusans, joining the revolutionary movements of 1848 (known as the Springtime of the Peoples), welcomed British soldiers, as Great Britain, soon joined by France, positioned itself as a mediating power in the ongoing dispute between Sicilians and the Bourbons of Naples, who were forced to temporarily accept the existence of a new Kingdom of Sicily.

Divided between British and French garrisons, Syracuse saw its brief independence end quickly, returning under Ferdinand's rule, partly due to rivalry among the European powers involved in the conflict. The definitive turning point came with the subsequent movements for the birth of the Kingdom of Italy: Syracuse, freeing itself autonomously from Bourbon rule, surrendered to the Garibaldians on 28 July 1860. The power of the Bourbon monarchs was annulled, and from 1865, the city stably resumed its role as the capital of the southeastern Sicilian province (at the time, the Province of Syracuse included the future Province of Ragusa).

=== Contemporary era ===
During the Italian colonial war and the Fascist era, Syracuse assumed its traditional strategic role, with its geographic position suited for the route between Italy and Africa. King Victor Emmanuel III resided in the city multiple times (his last stay was in 1942), as did the Duce Benito Mussolini on several occasions.

From 1941 to 1943, during World War II, Syracuse endured numerous bombings. In the spring of 1941, off the city's coast, a British submarine torpedoed the liner Conte Rosso; the attack caused a severe loss of life for Italy (with over 1,200 deaths, it was the highest human toll on an Italian ship during the early phase of the conflict).

The city was occupied by the Allies between the night of 9 July and 10 July 1943, through Operation Ladbroke (part of the Allied invasion of Sicily). Initially, it served as the main headquarters of the AMGOT, the Allied military government that took control of Sicily. Near the frazione of Cassibile, specifically in the contrada of Santa Teresa Longarini (a few kilometers from Syracuse's southern entrance), the armistice between Italy and the Allies was secretly signed on 3 September 1943 (made public through the Badoglio Proclamation of 8 September 1943, to which it remains linked). Subsequently, the Syracuse War Cemetery was built in the city's central outskirts for fallen British soldiers (adjacent to Syracuse's monumental cemetery). After the war, the city experienced a period of reconstruction and renewed hope.

1953 was a significant year for Syracuse, as the weeping of a Marian effigy (depicting the Immaculate Heart of Mary) occurred, an event later declared miraculous by the Church. (Note: Pope Pius XII, at the Sicilian Marian convention, referring to the inexplicable event in Syracuse, said: "Will humanity understand the mysterious language of those tears?")

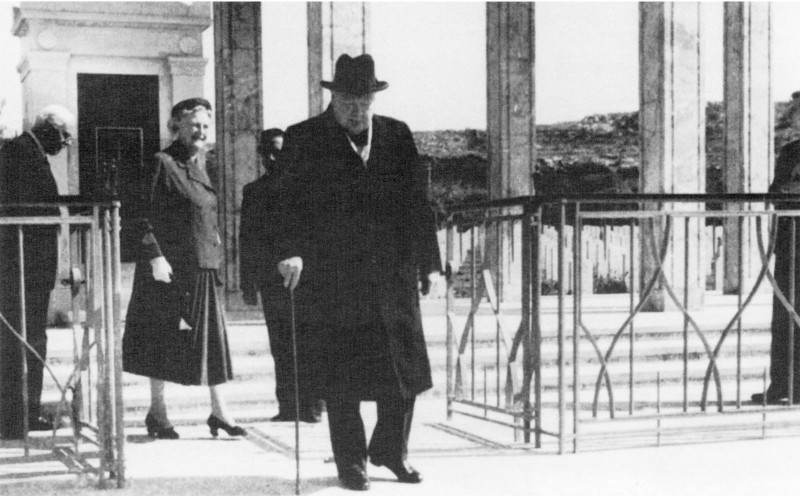
Sir Winston Churchill visiting the Syracuse War Cemetery during his stay in the city in 1954

In 1954, Winston Churchill arrived in the city, officially on vacation (he had previously passed through in 1917, traveling from Vienna to Malta). The British Prime Minister would recall his stay in Syracuse as "the most delightful vacation of his life as a traveler."

Between the late 1950s and the late 1970s, the Syracuse petrochemical complex emerged and developed in the northern periphery of the city, one of Europe's largest petrochemical complexes. This had social repercussions: for Syracuse's territories, the industry affected the Santa Panagia Bay, the contrada of Targia, and the village of Priolo Gargallo, which, becoming an industrial center, sought and gained independence from Syracuse in 1979. Petrochemical industries reached the northern entrance of the city. Beyond limited economic prosperity, the complex caused environmental degradation and pollution in the surrounding area.

In 1990, a violent earthquake, known as the Carlentini Earthquake, occurred on 13 December, caused significant damage to the city and sparked controversy due to the institutional silence that followed.

On 5 and 6 November 1994, Pope John Paul II visited the city to inaugurate the Sanctuary of Our Lady of Tears and delivered a speech to the citizens, urging them to respond to the socio-economic marginalization that risked excluding them from the life of the nation.

In 2005, Syracuse was included by UNESCO in the list of World Heritage Sites, together with the nearby Necropolis of Pantalica. Another significant event for the city occurred in 2009, when the Maniace Castle hosted the G8 Environment Forum, which resulted in the Carta di Siracusa on Biodiversity.

== Geography ==
Syracuse is located on the southeastern side of Sicily. Its geography is highly varied, featuring hills and natural caves, while two rivers flow along its southwestern edge. The city is predominantly bordered by the sea, which surrounds it almost entirely. The coast is mostly rocky and jagged, with various promontories, bays, small islands, and peninsulas.

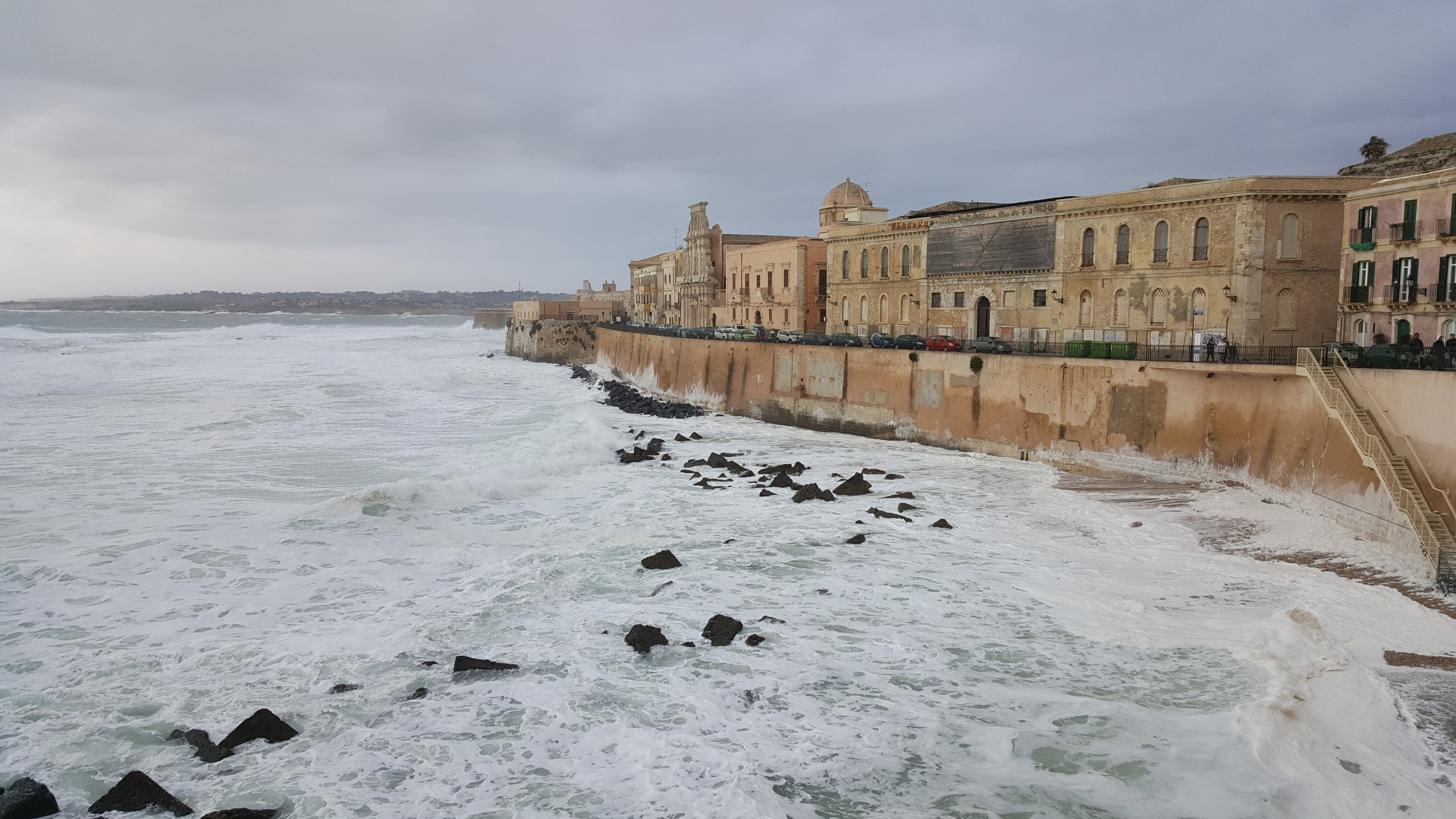
The island of Ortygia viewed from its eastern side; in the background, the Maddalena Peninsula is visible.

The city is partly located on the island of Ortygia and partly on the mainland (the entire area lies within the island of Sicily). Its unique geographical position has made it famous for its sunsets (thanks to the zenith angles from which they are observed, they have been described for millennia as among the most beautiful in the world).

The configuration of the southern coast creates a vast natural inlet within which the Great Harbor is located: approximately 1,200 meters from the tip of Ortygia lies Cape Murro di Porco, a promontory of the Maddalena Peninsula, locally referred to simply as Isola (in reference to the toponym of a district on its eastern coast, whose origin is tied to a former, no longer existing condition of insularity). To the north of the city lies another promontory: Cape Santa Panagia, where the third port of Syracuse, the Trogilo, is believed to have been located.

The city faces the central Mediterranean Sea, surrounded by the basin of the Ionian Sea. Syracuse lends its name to the southeastern Sicilian escarpment, known as the "Malta and Syracuse Escarpment" (also called the "Hyblaean-Maltese Escarpment"), which is primarily responsible for the area's high seismicity. This escarpment extends east of the Syracuse territory, into the depths of the Ionian Sea, as far as the island of Malta. (Note: It is not a single block but a system of tectonic faults: the Hyblaean-Maltese limestones to the east are cut off, giving rise to the escarpment. Southeastern Sicily (the so-called Hyblaean Plateau) lies where the African Plate and the Eurasian Plate have been converging for 10 million years.)

- Seismic classification: Zone 1 (high seismicity), PCM Ordinance No. 3274 of 20 March 2003, subsequently amended by D.G.R. No. 81 of 24 February 2022.

=== Topography ===
Geologically, the Syracuse area is part of the Hyblaean Mountains. Its topography consists of moderate peaks, the most prominent being the plateau of Epipoli, part of the easternmost Hyblaean foothills. At the base of Epipoli, located between the districts of Acradina and Neapolis, rises the Temenite Hill. The urban landscape is further marked by a rocky outcrop—rich in caves—known as the Crag of Akradina, with jagged walls of white limestone, referred to as the Syracuse white stone.

Within the Crag of Akradina lies the Cappuccini Quarry, the largest of Syracuse's latomie (extensive millennia-old quarries, documented since the Greek era (Note: Cicero provided an extensive description, calling them "a grandiose, magnificent work of kings and tyrants.")). The latomie are a defining feature of the city, with numerous examples present.

To the north of Syracuse, the Hyblaean foothills continue, forming rocky landscapes and caves, particularly evident in the Scala Greca district. There, the Santa Panagia Quarry, carved over millennia by a torrent of meteoric water, represents the only Hyblaean quarry in contact with the sea. The physical area of Syracuse is characterized by mature karst formations.

In the contrada of Grotta Perciata, at the edge of the municipal territory, lies one of Sicily's most significant karst caves, for which a protected reserve was established: the Grotta Monello Natural Reserve, situated among fluvial valleys and steep, often inaccessible slopes. Inside Grotta Monello, notable stalactites and stalagmites of various shapes are found.

=== Hydrography ===
The main rivers flowing through the city's area are the Anapo and the Ciane: (Note: The Anapo originates outside the Syracuse territory, while the Ciane rises from the Pisima springs (the main one, called Fonte Ciane, and the smaller Pisimotta, located at Cozzo del Pantano, a few kilometers from the sea.)) the riverbed of the Ciane merges with that of the Anapo at its end, with the two freshwater streams sharing a single mouth in the Ionian Sea, near the alluvial plain of the Pantanelli, where the natural reserve of Syracuse's salt pans is located (the salt pans have been out of use for several years).

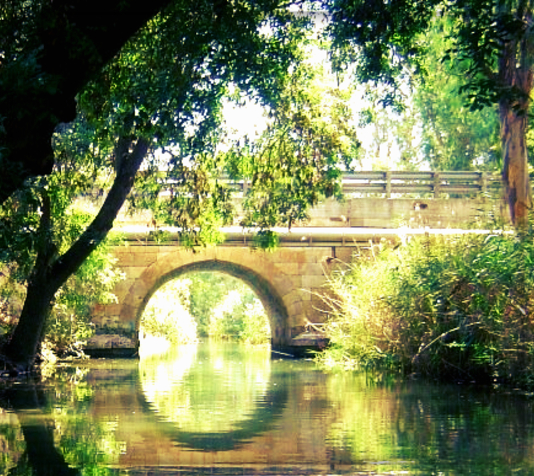
Bridge over the Ciane (near the Pantanelli)

In the marshy area west of the city, at Pantanelli—where the Lisimelie marshes once stood (according to ancient tradition, these marshes were so significant that the city's toponym is said to derive from them (Note: Due to its marshy and lagoon-like character, this area was called "the Pantanelli." It is there, in prehistory, that the Syraka marsh is believed to have given the city its name.))—following land reclamation works in the 20th century, several canals were dug: the Mammaiabica (which runs alongside the Ciane), Scandurra, Pismotta, and Regina.

Another significant river, culturally millennia-old, flows through the municipal area: the Cassibile, from which the populous frazione of Syracuse takes its name. The mouth of this river is located in the other frazione of Fontane Bianche.

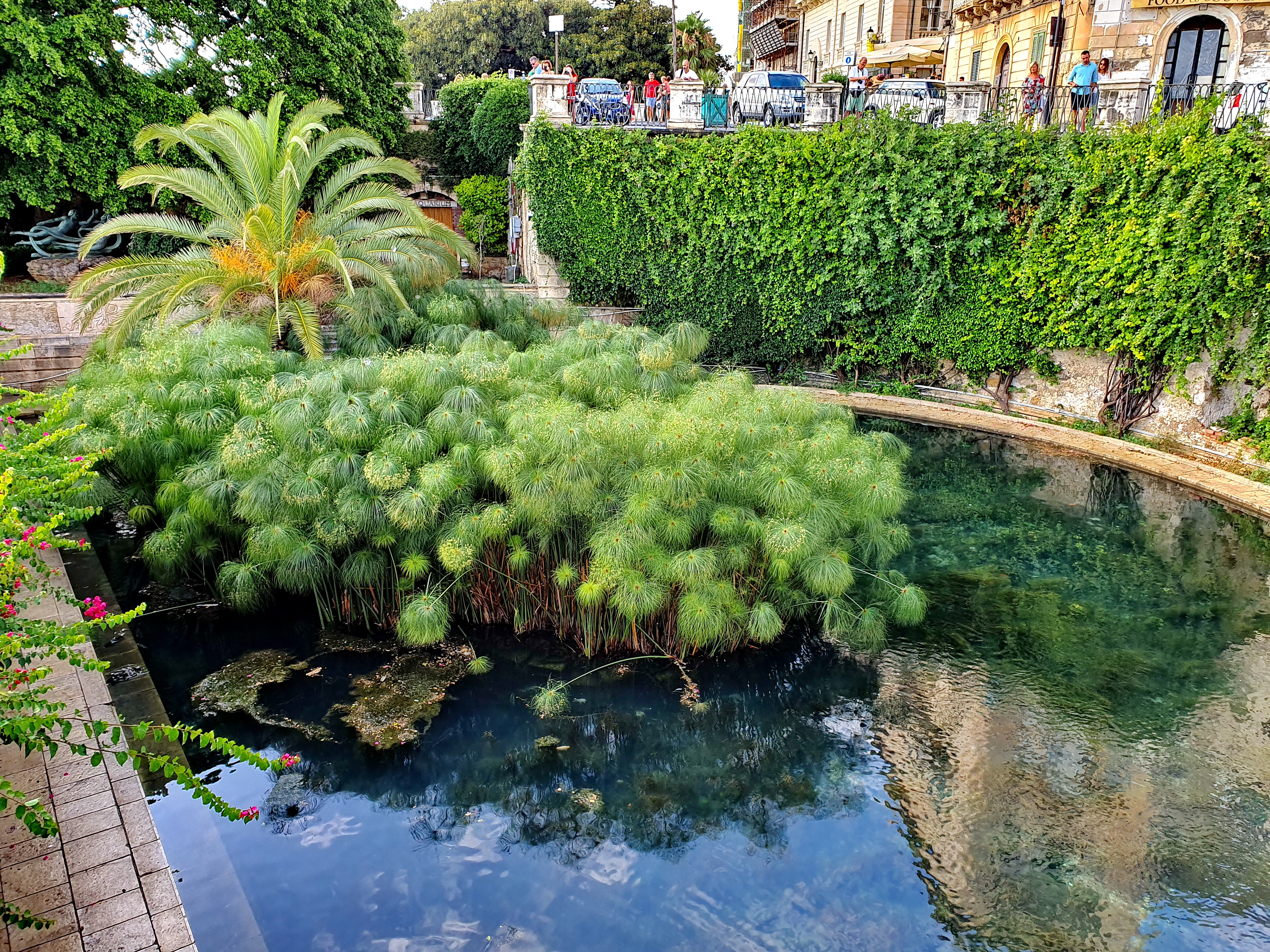
The Fountain of Arethusa with papyrus at its center; a rare but typical plant of Syracuse

In the historic center of the city, represented by the island of Ortygia, flows the brackish water of the Fountain of Arethusa, originating from the Hyblaean aquifers. On the Temenite Hill, within the Grotta del Ninfeo, is the outlet of the Galermi Aqueduct, notable for being Sicily's oldest aqueduct (built by the tyrant Gelon in 480 BC, it still carries the waters of the Anapo into the city).

=== Flora and fauna ===
The Mediterranean maquis characterizes Syracuse's flora and fauna: palms, prickly pears, olive groves, and citrus orchards dominate the landscape. Due to the presence of the sea, one of the Mediterranean's most significant concentrations of dwarf palms has developed, covering nearly a square kilometer. In the city, at the archaeological zone, one of Italy's most impressive centuries-old Moreton Bay fig trees can also be observed.

Of particular interest is the river flora: the most unique plant, due to its rarity in Europe and worldwide, is the papyrus (Cyperus papyrus), which grows spontaneously in the city (observable along the Ciane).

Regarding fauna, Syracuse plays a primary role in hosting migratory birds and its territory includes species rare elsewhere in Europe. The complex geographical configuration allows the fauna to be divided into species that are cave-dwelling (or speleological), fluvial, and predominantly marine: the marine protected area of Plemmirio serves as an important observatory for the presence of cetaceans (rorquals, dolphins, sperm whales, and other sea mammals).

=== Human geography ===
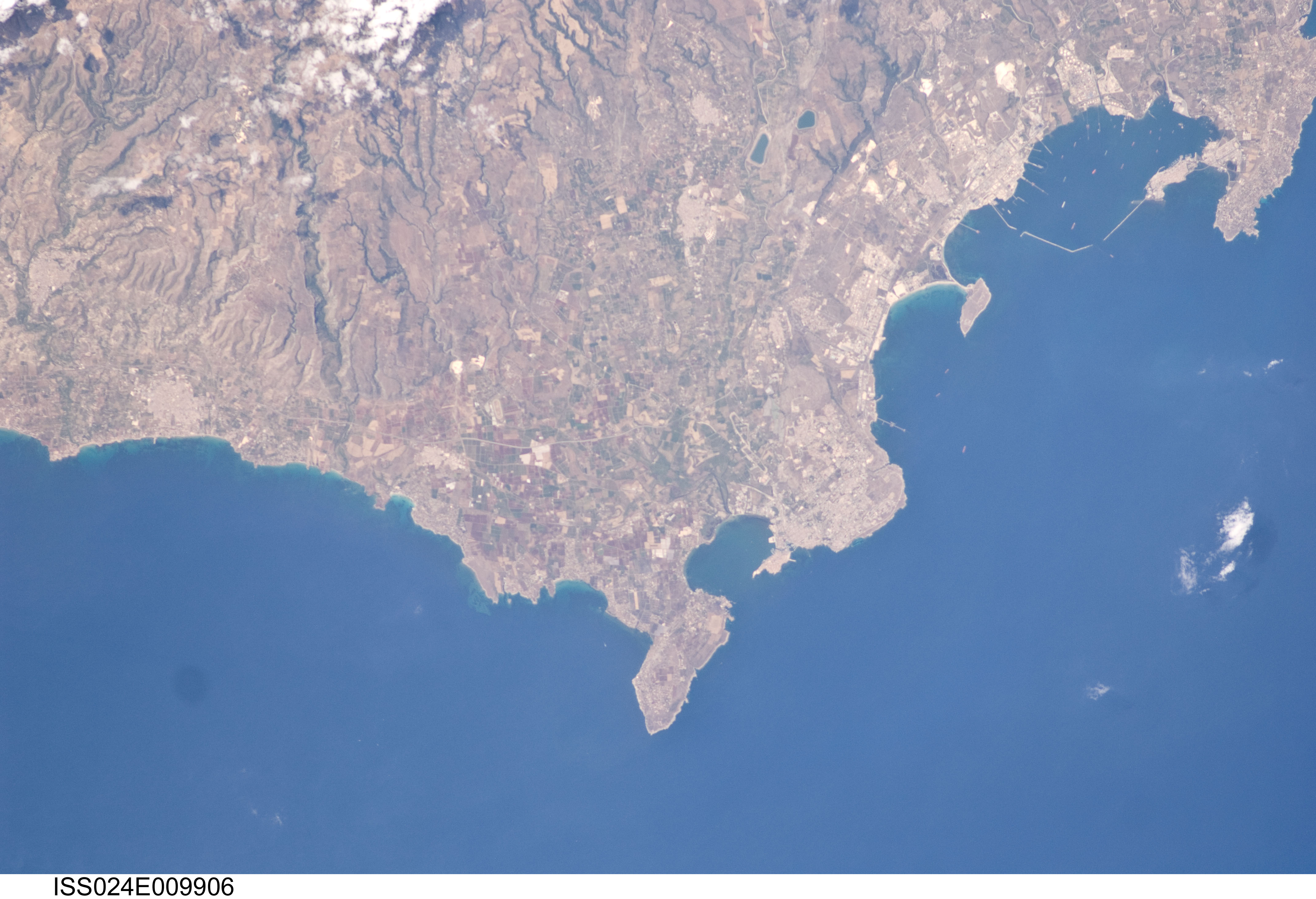
NASA: Syracuse and its province seen from space

Syracuse borders to the north with the municipalities of Melilli and Priolo Gargallo, to the south with the municipality of Avola, to the west with the municipalities of Canicattini Bagni, Solarino, Floridia, Noto, and Palazzolo Acreide, while to the east it is bathed by the Ionian Sea. The Syracuse municipality has two populous historical frazioni: Belvedere, located to the northwest, and Cassibile, located to the southwest; the former has a population of about 7,000 inhabitants, while the latter has around 6,500 inhabitants. Among Sicilian municipal territories, Syracuse's is one of the largest, so much so that in 1827 it extended as far as what is now Solarino, then known as San Paolo Solarino, which in that same year obtained separation from Syracuse by Royal Decree, though this became effective only two years later with the creation of the new comunello; the same process was followed by the neighboring Floridia, also in the 19th century; until 1979, Priolo Gargallo was also a hamlet of Syracuse and during that period requested and obtained municipal autonomy, significantly reducing Syracuse's northern territorial extent, leaving only Targia, while the remaining area (including the northern coastline) was divided between the municipalities of Melilli and Priolo Gargallo. In addition to the two main inhabited centers, other settlements have emerged over the years, particularly along the southern coast: Carrozzieri, Isola, Plemmirio, Terrauzza, Fanusa, Milocca, Arenella, Ognina, and Fontane Bianche. Inland, there are the hamlets of Canalicchio, Tremilia, Tivoli, and Santa Lucia Village, as well as various rural districts and scattered località.

Until 2018, the urban territory was divided into nine administrative districts, which were abolished as stipulated by regional law no. 11/2015: Ortygia, Santa Lucia, Acradina, Grotta Santa, Neapolis, Tiche, Epipolae, Belvedere, and Cassibile. The main rural districts of Syracuse are: Pantanelli, Santa Teresa Longarini, and Targia, while the neighborhoods include: the island of Ortygia, which is the original and oldest part of the city; on the mainland, the remaining historic center between the Umbertine zone and the Borgata, to which the modern city center, consisting of Corso Gelone and the neighborhood of the same name, has been added; between the lower and upper parts of Syracuse, Grotta Santa and Mazzarona; in the upper area, Tisia, Zecchino, Bosco Minniti, Tiche, Santa Panagia, Scala Greca, Villaggio Miano and Pizzuta.

As of 2017, the city had a total population of approximately 122,000 people (slightly down from the early 1990s, when it had 125,941, and slightly up from 2011, when it had 118,442). The majority of the urban population is concentrated in the former administrative districts of Tiche (20% of the total population), Akradina (19% of the total), and Grotta Santa (18% of the total). The remaining 43% of the municipal population is distributed fairly evenly across the other six former subdivisions, including Ortigia, where 4% of the population resides.

=== Climate ===
Syracuse's climate is cool with moderate rainfall in winter and extremely hot and dry in summer. Notably, the Syracusan climate is dominated by the sirocco wind. In autumn, floods can occur, with peaks exceeding 100 to 150 millimetres or 4 to 6 inches daily.

On 11 August 2021, at the station of the Sicilian Agrometeorological Information Service near the border with Floridia, the highest temperature ever recorded in Italy and Europe was registered, reaching 48.8 °C or 119.8 °F. As this station is not part of the World Meteorological Organization (WMO), the official Italian record remains attributed to Foggia, which recorded 47 °C or 116.6 °F on 25 June 2007 at the Amendola weather station, part of the Air Force's meteorological network (affiliated with the WMO). In January 2023, a study on sunshine hours declared Syracuse the sunniest city in Italy, with 346.83 total sunshine hours, just ahead of nearby Catania with 346.78 hours. On 18 January 2024, Syracuse recorded an anomalous heatwave and sirocco, with temperatures reaching 25.3 °C or 77.5 °F.

- Climate classification: Zone B, 799 DD

Climate data for Syracuse
Month	Jan	Feb	Mar	Apr	May	Jun	Jul	Aug	Sep	Oct	Nov	Dec	Year
Mean daily maximum °C (°F)	16 (61)	16 (61)	18 (64)	20 (68)	24 (75)	28 (82)	32 (90)	32 (90)	29 (84)	25 (77)	20 (68)	17 (63)	23 (74)
Mean daily minimum °C (°F)	5 (41)	5 (41)	7 (45)	8 (46)	12 (54)	16 (61)	19 (66)	19 (66)	17 (63)	14 (57)	10 (50)	7 (45)	12 (53)
Average rainfall mm (inches)	75 (3.0)	53 (2.1)	46 (1.8)	35 (1.4)	19 (0.7)	6 (0.2)	5 (0.2)	9 (0.4)	45 (1.8)	106 (4.2)	62 (2.4)	86 (3.4)	547 (21.6)
Average relative humidity (%)	73	71	70	70	68	65	64	67	68	72	75	76	70

== Symbols ==
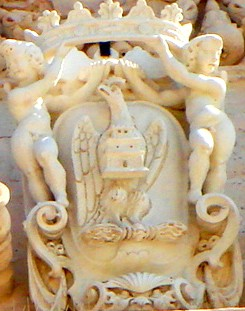
The coat of arms of Syracuse carved on the facade of the city Senate palace

In ancient times, the city featured its own symbols on its coins. Its most famous and ancient emblem was the face of Arethusa surrounded by dolphins, which made it renowned throughout the Mediterranean. Syracuse was also the first city in Sicily to depict the triskelion on its coins, significantly contributing to its spread as the island's main symbol.

Syracuse is also one of the first geographical locations to adopt the figure of the eagle: starting from the Hellenistic period, it was depicted on metal, shown grasping a bundle of lightning bolts. This animal — always clutching the lightning, an original sign of Zeus — was revived during the Middle Ages to become the city's sole symbol, engraved on its coat of arms as early as the Swabian period.

Subsequently, in the 15th century, a fortress completely replaced the eagle, until, in the 17th century, the city's most enduring symbols were combined to form the current coat of arms of Syracuse: a towered eagle (with a crenelated castle) surmounted by a crown.

Green, with a natural eagle in flight, lowered and with its left wing closed, crowned with a royal crown, charged on the chest with a golden castle, turreted, grasping Jupiter's lightning bolts with golden claws. Below the shield is a blue strip with the inscription S.P.Q.S.

— Description of the coat of arms in the municipal statute.

The current coat of arms was granted on 8 December 1942 and is mentioned in the third article of the municipal statute. The motto placed below the shield of green color, on a blue strip, bears the inscription S.P.Q.S, in Latin, "Senatus PopulusQue Syracusanus", translated: "The Senate and the People of Syracuse".

Meanwhile, the aforementioned figure of Arethusa surrounded by dolphins is currently used alongside the biga (which, like the quadriga, was another well-known symbol of the ancient city), the Winged Victory, and the lion (a figure that appeared in the context of warfare against Carthage) to represent the coat of arms of the Free Municipal Consortium of Syracuse (formerly the province).

The civic banner consists of a green drape.

== Demographics ==
Historical population
Year	Pop.	±%
1861	19,286	—
1871	19,906	+3.2%
1881	21,598	+8.5%
1901	29,600	+37.0%
1911	39,330	+32.9%
1921	46,557	+18.4%
1931	46,048	−1.1%
1936	49,478	+7.4%
1951	67,568	+36.6%
1961	82,466	+22.0%
1971	100,737	+22.2%
1981	117,615	+16.8%
1991	125,941	+7.1%
2001	123,657	−1.8%
2011	118,385	−4.3%
2021	117,055	−1.1%
Source: ISTAT

As of 2026, the population is 115,515, of which 49.1% are males, and 50.9% are females. Minors make up 14.8% of the population, and seniors make up 25.0%.

The city bears the marks of past Greek anthropization throughout its urban layout and beyond, as ancient Syracuse was one of the largest metropolises in the world. Much of Sicily was under its control, and the exact geo-anthropological boundaries of this capital are not precisely known.

It is estimated that at the peak of its development and splendor, between the 5th and 6th centuries BC, Syracuse reached a population of one million inhabitants, well before other cities that later became significant in the Mediterranean, such as Rome and Alexandria in Egypt.

— UNESCO Site Management, p. 32.

In its millennia-long history, Syracuse has experienced periods of significant population growth and severe depopulation. In the Greek era, the city saw its greatest expansion: historians differ on the exact number of inhabitants, but it is widely regarded as one of the first densely populated metropolises of antiquity. The noted London classicist Michael Grant wrote about it:

Although the biggest city in the world was Pataliputra (Patna) on the Ganges, Syracuse was the largest in Europe.

— Michael Grant, The Civilizations of Europe, 1965, p. 23.

Dominations, wars, and famines permanently altered Syracuse's demographic profile, reducing it in the second half of the modern era to a population of just 15,000 inhabitants, with its inhabited center concentrated solely on the fortified island of Ortygia.

A significant population growth occurred due to the economic boom from the post-World War II period onward, peaking at 125,941 inhabitants in 1991. Currently, the municipality is experiencing a sharp demographic decline, starting just over a decade ago when the population dropped from 124,083 in 2008 to 118,385 in 2011, interrupted by a slight increase in 2012-2014 but resuming from 2015 and culminating in the latest ISTAT census of 30 June 2022, which recorded a total of 115,984 inhabitants. In 2021 alone, there were 7,000 fewer residents. This marks the lowest population since the post-war period.

Emigration, low birth rates, and increased mortality are the main factors contributing to Syracuse's progressive depopulation.

=== Immigration ===
Foreign-born population (2025)
Country of birth	Population
Sri Lanka	1,200
Morocco	798
Libya	591
Romania	442
Germany	436
Argentina	380
Bangladesh	372
Poland	368
Tunisia	279
Nigeria	245
France	208
Venezuela	188
Switzerland	183
Russia	167
China	160

As of 2025, immigrants make up 7.6% of the population. The 5 largest foreign countries of birth are Sri Lanka, Morocco, Libya, Romania, and Germany.

=== Languages and dialects ===
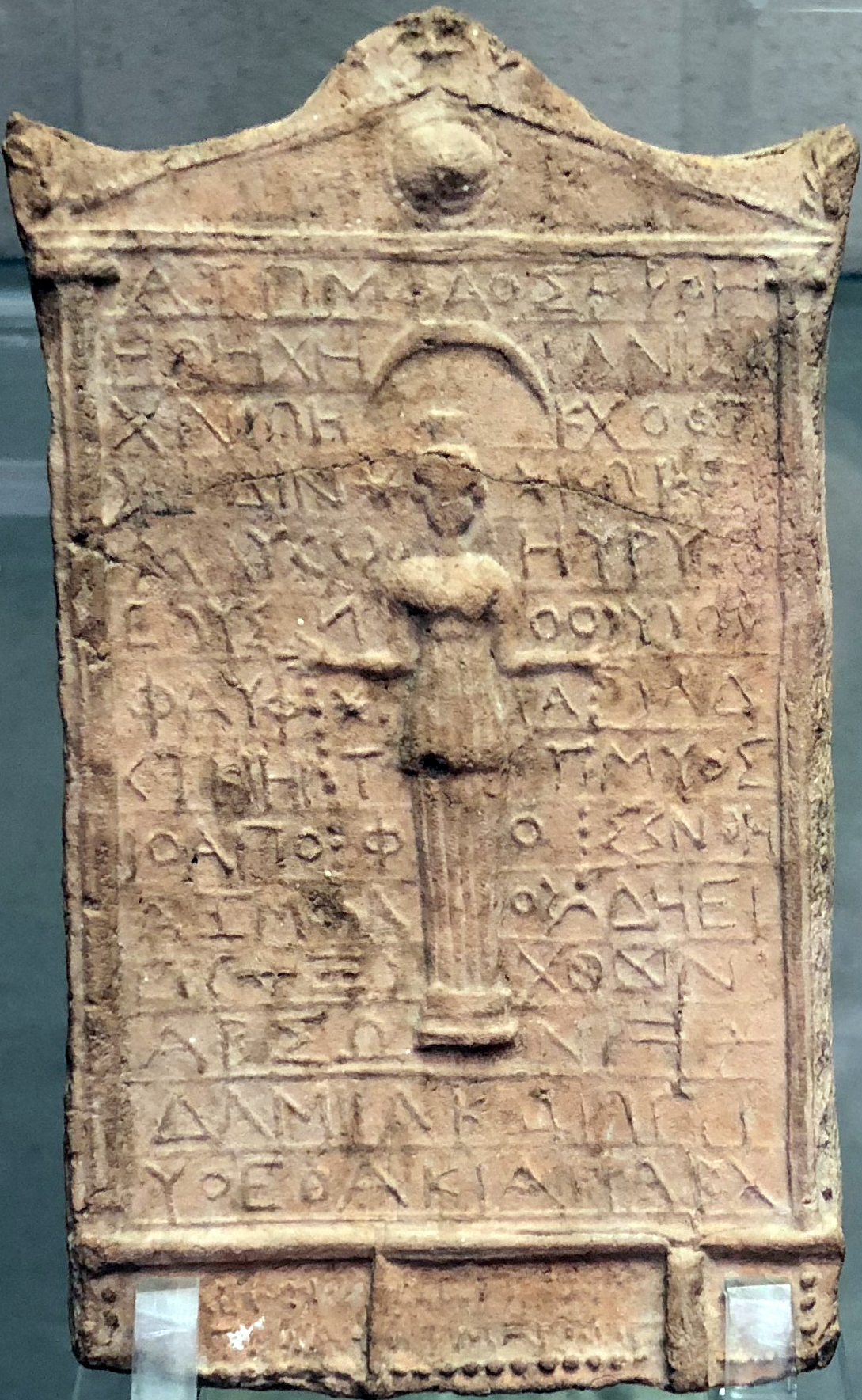
Honorary terracotta plaque with the Syracusan alphabet, found in the city's port. Hellenistic period

In antiquity, due to its active cultural and commercial movement, the Syracusan dialect was one of the "linguae francae" of the Greco-Mediterranean world. The language of the ancient Syracusans, found in the works of writers even far from Sicily, has been defined as the Greek-Syracusan dialect. (Note: The ancient Syracusans primarily assimilated the Doric dialect, as confirmed by Theocritus in his writings, but their speech is distinguished from purely Doric and Ionic dialects (Ionic elements are also found in written evidence from ancient Syracuse.))

Later, the local dialect was enriched by new external influences, particularly from the Latin language (itself influenced by ancient Greek).

Around the 13th century, with the so-called Sicilian School, the islanders unified their language, passing their content and phonetic patterns to the Tuscans, thus laying the first foundation for the birth of the Italian language. The leading figure of this linguistic school was a resident of the Siracusan area: Giacomo da Lentini. The centuries-long presence of the Spanish in the city was particularly influential on the local dialect: many Syracusan words derive from the Spanish language.

According to modern studies on the Sicilian language, the Syracusan dialect, despite its specific peculiarities (e.g., the letter D typically becomes an R in Syracusan speech), falls into the following two categories:

- Eastern Sicilian dialect
- Southeastern metaphonetic Sicilian dialect

=== Religion ===
Although ancient Syracuse was one of the most significant centers for the cult of the Greek gods — it proclaimed itself to the ancient world as the sacred land of the lunar goddess Artemis, and considered its inhabitants the chosen ones of the chthonic Demeter, also hosting for centuries some of the most powerful priests of Olympia, such as the Iamids (Note: For more on the link between Olympia and Syracuse, see Syracuse in the Panhellenic Games.) —, the change in religious belief came early: thanks to its primary maritime port for the communication routes of the Roman Empire, it was an initial destination for Christian evangelizers.

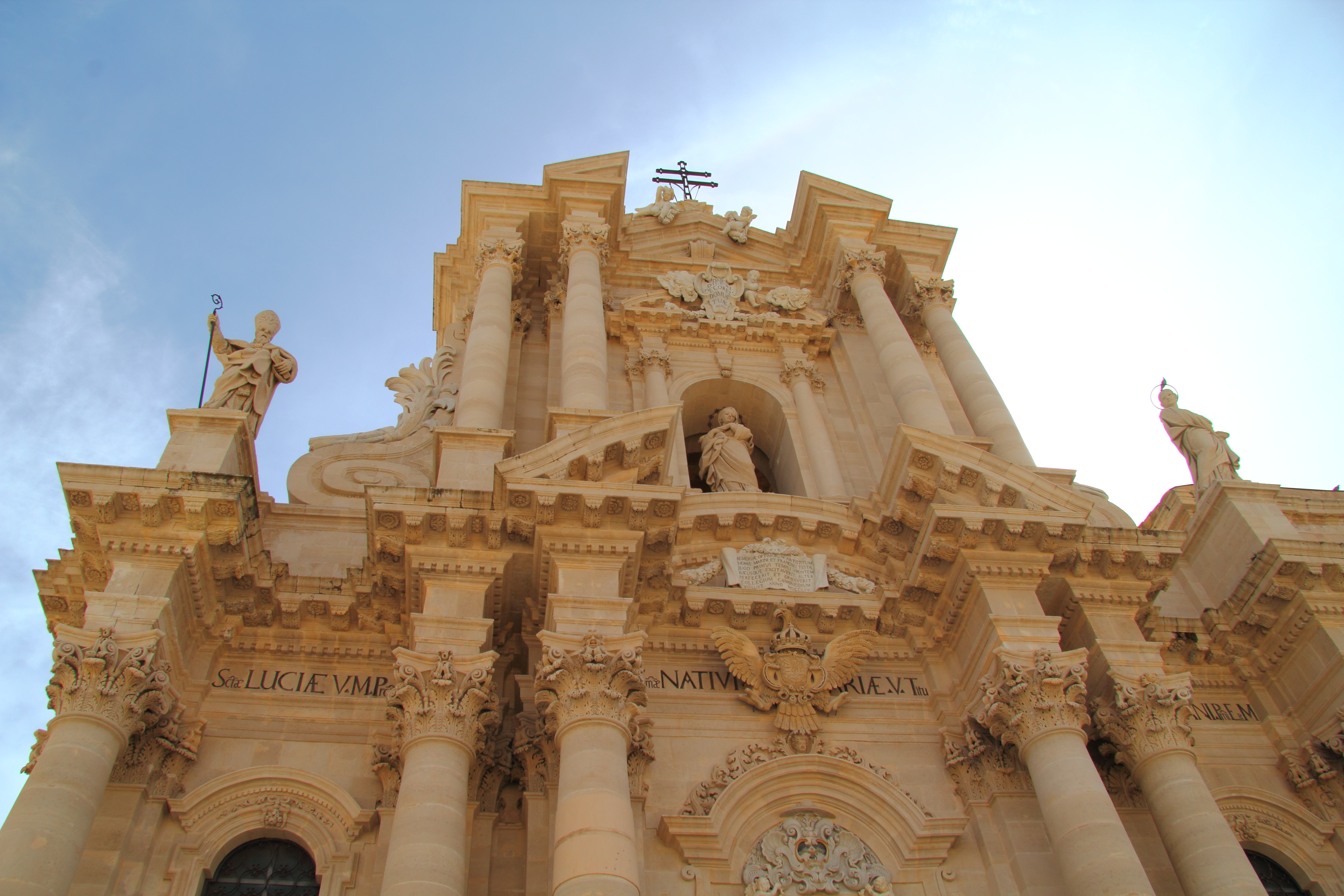
Upper part of the Syracusan Cathedral: on the left, the statue of the protobishop from Antioch, Marcian, next to the statues of Mary of Nazareth and Lucy of Syracuse

The tradition of Syracuse (with the earliest document on this matter dating back to the Byzantine era) has handed down the arrival of its first bishop, Marcian (or Marcianus), as early as the year 39 (just six years after the Crucifixion of Jesus), sent by the prince of the apostles, Peter, while he was still in Antioch, with the purpose of bringing the Christian message to the population of Syracuse and converting them. This is recorded in the Roman Martyrology: for this reason, the Syracusans considered their first church (established within one of the main Greek temples of the city) to be the oldest in the Western world.

Syracuse also appears in the New Testament as a landing place for the apostle Paul (the author of the letters to the Corinthians), who stayed there for three days in the year 61.

From its earliest days, the establishment of the Syracusan church was contested by Eastern and Western ecclesiastical authorities, as the city had become part of the Byzantine Empire by the time of its development. The Patriarchate of Constantinople sought to appoint the bishop of Syracuse, but the popes of the Latin Church (to which the Syracusan Christian community was originally linked) expressed the same desire. In this context, the church of Syracuse became autocephalous, meaning its bishop recognized no religious authority above him. It was Pope Nicholas I, in September 860, who explicitly requested the Emperor Michael III to grant Rome, rather than Byzantium, the right to consecrate the religious leader of Syracuse, so as not to betray an ancient custom dating back to the time of the apostles. This appeal, however, was ignored by the emperor. (Note: Pope Nicholas I, Cf. PAGI in Baron. ad ann. 730, n. 11.: 25 September 860: We wish to consecrate the Syracusan archbishop in our see so that the tradition established by the apostles is not violated in our times Volumus ut consecratio Syracusano archiepiscopo nostra a sede impendatur ut traditio ab apostolis instituta nullatenus nostris temporibus violetur)

At that time, the Archdiocese of Syracuse was the most important Christian see in Sicily. Its metropolitan area encompassed the entire island, including Malta, and was responsible for the entire Christian-Byzantine region of Southern Italy. One of its bishops, Gregory Asbestas, was the instigator of the Photian Schism, a precursor to the East–West Schism, which marked the separation between the Latin Church and the Greek Church. During the Iconoclastic controversy, the Syracusan archdiocese supported the veneration of sacred images.

The arrival of Islamic rule in the city completely altered the hegemonic context of the Syracusan church. The last bishop of the ancient era was Sophronius, who was deported by the Arabs to Palermo along with the rest of the Syracusans and the monk Theodosius, the author of the chronicle of the siege. When the Normans eventually ended Islamic rule in Syracuse, the religious context was significantly diminished: the Syracusan archbishop was no longer the metropolitan of Sicily, and the diocesan structure of the island was reorganized.

=== Traditions and folklore ===
The most popular Syracusan festival, renowned both nationally and internationally, is the feast of Saint Lucy, which begins on 13 December with a procession carrying the saint's statue through the city streets. It concludes seven days later with the Octave of Saint Lucy, when the silver statue is returned to the Cathedral. Since 1927, a young woman from Sweden, chosen in her home country and dressed in white to represent Lucy of Syracuse, has participated in the procession alongside the local population. This Swedish tradition forms the basis of the twinning between Syracuse and Stockholm. The feast of Saint Lucy is repeated on the first Sunday of May, known as the feast of Saint Lucy of the Quails, celebrated in period costumes. This event commemorates a miraculous occurrence in May 1646, when a dove (the symbol of the Holy Spirit) entered the Syracusan church dedicated to Saint Lucy, heralding the end of a famine that had brought the city to its knees. Following this unusual visit, a ship laden with grain arrived at the Aretusean port.

== Administration ==
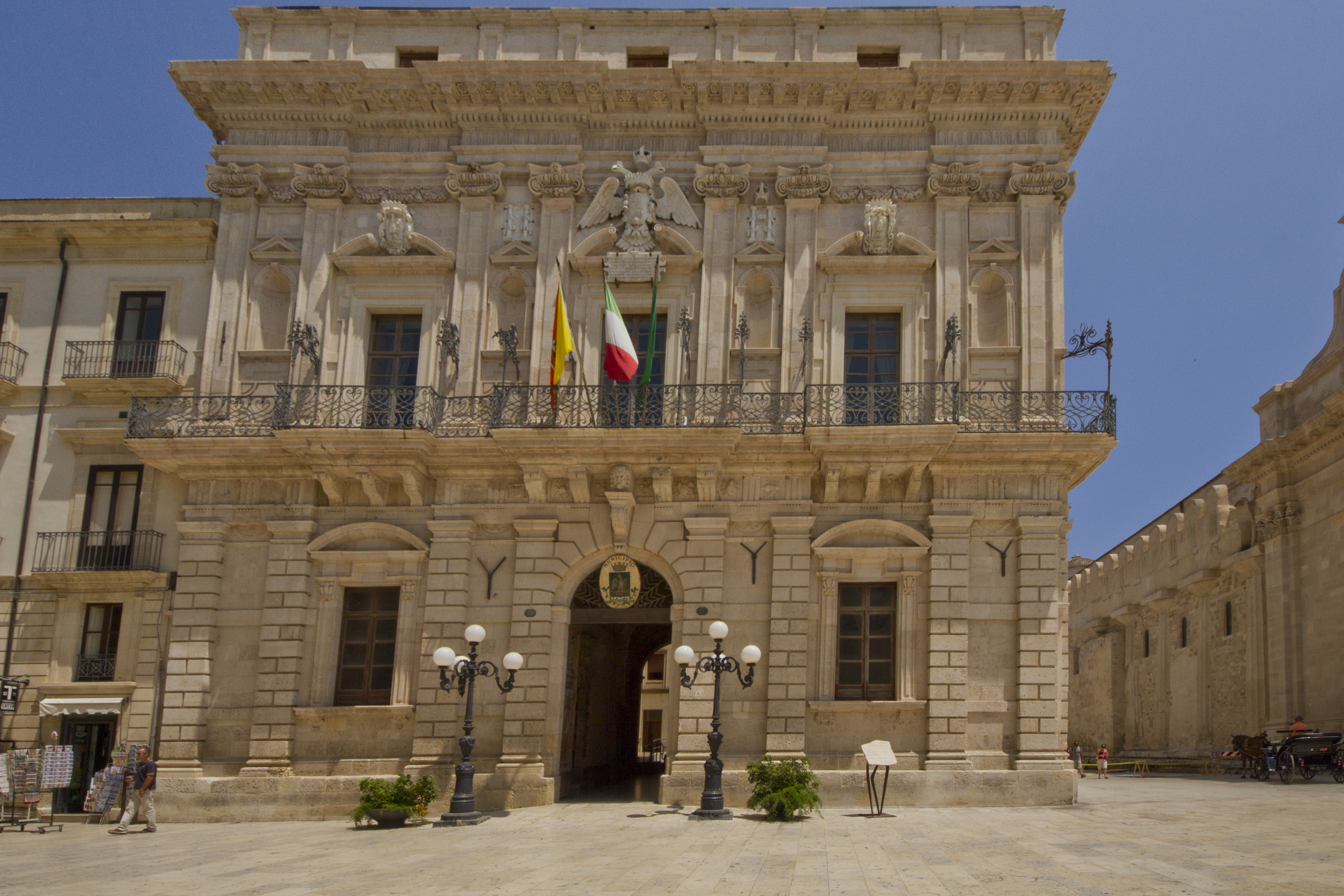
The Senate Building of Syracuse (built during the Spanish period)

=== Consulates ===
The city is home to consulates of the following countries:

- Honorary Consulate of Malta
- Honorary Consulate of Turkey

Syracuse has also, in recent years, promoted an international cooperation initiative called "Great Agreement"; a protocol addressing initiatives aimed at the development of Mediterranean countries; the signatories were the board of the Syracuse Civic Consultation and the consuls of Turkey, Malta, Greece, Senegal, and Azerbaijan. In 2015, the consulate of Venezuela joined the agreement, thus expanding the scope of cooperation overseas.

== Sights ==
Syracuse and the Rocky Necropolis of Pantalica
UNESCO World Heritage Site
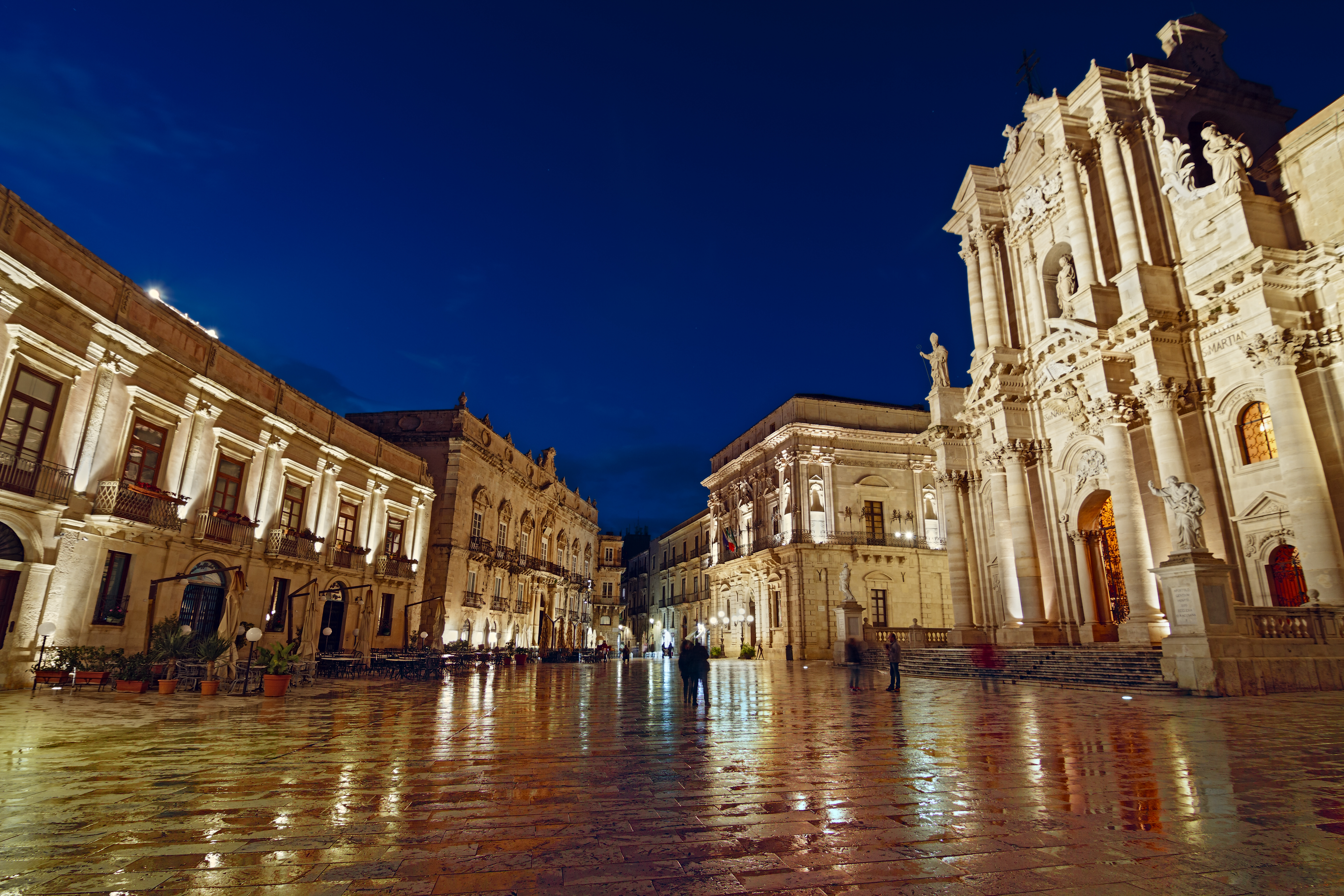
- Interactive map of Syracuse and the Rocky Necropolis of Pantalica
- Criteria: (ii), (iii), (iv), (vi)
- Inscription: 2005 (29th Session)
- Endangered: Not in danger

The cultural, architectural and artistic stratification evident in the Syracuse/Pantalica ensemble bears exceptional testimony to the history and cultural diversity of the Syracuse region over three millennia from the ancient Greek period to the Baroque.

— UNESCO, Syracuse and the Rocky Necropolis of Pantalica.

UNESCO includes Syracuse among its World Heritage Sites based on four criteria, including the exceptional universal importance of the events that took place there (Criterion VI) and the extraordinary cultural diversity concentrated in a unique space (Criterion II).

The city encompasses a millennia-spanning architectural-cultural heritage, preserving in its museums archaeological artifacts of an even greater antiquity than its Greek foundation.

=== Civil architecture ===
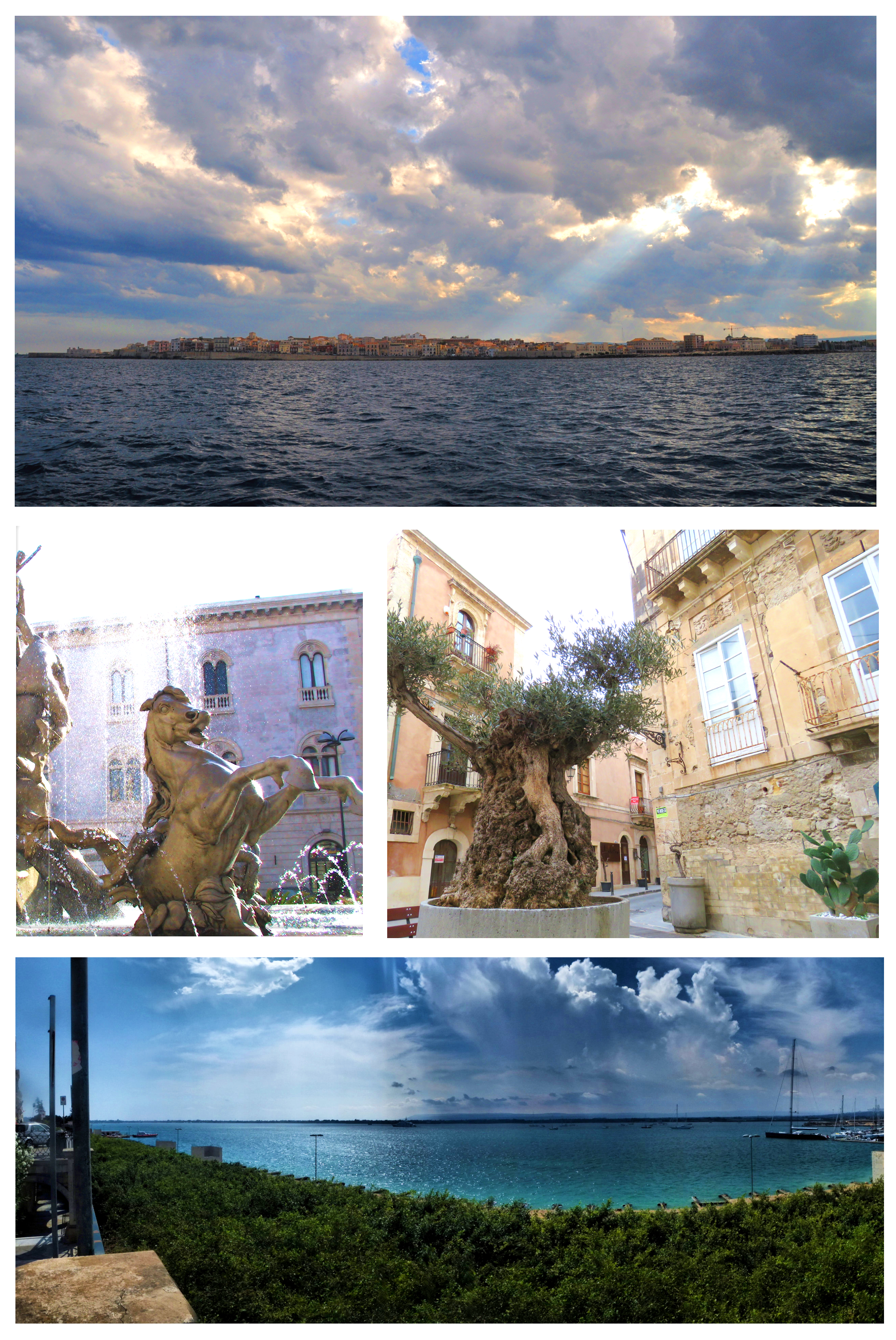
The collage shows some of the most characteristic views of the island of Syracuse, Ortygia.

Syracuse's architecture almost always features white facades, tending toward beige or golden-yellow, as they were built with the Hyblaean stone, locally called giuggiulena stone, or nougat stone, due to its malleability and tones similar to the aforementioned food. For this reason, Syracuse is often architecturally referred to as the "white city".

Most of the numerous and ancient noble palaces are located on the island of Ortygia, as during the medieval and Renaissance periods, the city was confined within it, while more recent Syracuse is home to administrative and governmental buildings (e.g., the hospital complex and the court of justice). Among the earliest post-classical civil constructions are the 14th-century seat of the Queen's Chamber and the 14th-century Mergulese-Montalto Palace, in Chiaramontano Gothic style. Other medieval buildings persist in the city, particularly from the Aragonese-Catalan period: examples include the Bellomo Palace and surviving elements of the Zapata-Gargallo Palace, owned by the prestigious families of the same name (a descendant founded the original village of Priolo Gargallo, Tommaso Gargallo). However, it was after the 17th-century earthquake and subsequent reconstruction that the predominant style of Syracuse emerged: Sicilian Baroque. The city gave birth to one of the main exponents of this style: the architect Rosario Gagliardi.

The Palazzo Vermexio, seat of the municipal government, remains one of the greatest examples of Baroque art applied to an administrative building. The ultimate evolution of Baroque was Rococo; Syracuse clearly displays its elaborate signs: palaces such as Beneventano del Bosco (whose ancient rooms hosted, at different times, the Grand Master of the Knights of Malta Philippe Villiers de L'Isle-Adam, Admiral Horatio Nelson and the Bourbon sovereigns who visited the city, including the Count of Syracuse, Leopold of the Two Sicilies), the Impellizzeri, the Borgia del Casale (owned by the Syracuse branch of the influential Borgia family), and the Bonanno of Linguaglossa, distinguished by its facades with Baroque coats of arms and a loggia accessed via a red marble staircase, were built adopting the aforementioned ornamental style.

The building housing the Syracuse chancery is the Archbishop's Palace; within it, various centuries of architectural transformations are visible: from Swabian construction to 18th- and 19th-century additions. Dating directly to the 19th century and reflecting Art Nouveau and Neoclassical styles (individually or sometimes both) are the palaces named: of the Superintendency of Cultural Heritage, of the Clock (so-called due to the large mechanical clock atop it), of the Old Market, and of the Chamber of Commerce.

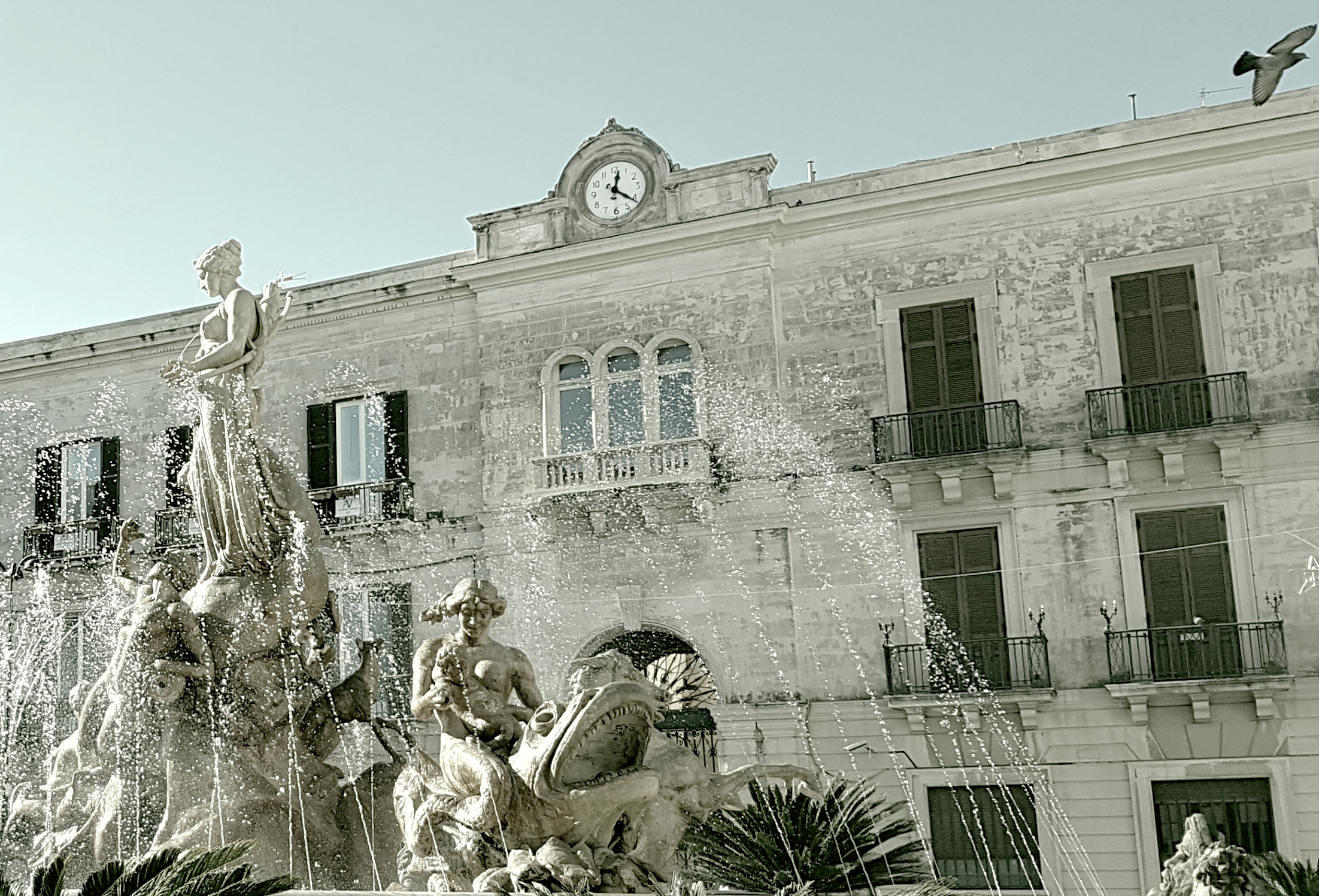
The front facade of the Palazzo dell’Orologio, at Piazza Archimede. On the left, the statues of the Fountain of Diana

Also from the 19th century is the palace of the Municipal Theatre of Syracuse, built so that "the land of Epicharmus would have a theatre suited" to host the artistic life of the population. A decade later, the palace of the railway station was inaugurated, followed by the maritime station building (now the seat of the Coast Guard).

In the first half of the 20th century, the palaces of the Hotel Des Etrangers, the Grand Hotel (both among the oldest hotels in Syracuse), and the Post Office (now also converted into an accommodation facility) were built.

The city's main and historic villas are essentially three: Politi, Landolina, and Reimann. The Villa Politi stands above the Syracuse quarries (originally built as the Grand Hotel Villa Politi) and was constructed in the 19th century by the Austrian noblewoman Maria Theresa Laudien, wife of the Syracusan Raffaello Politi, whose efforts earned it the reputation of an "international salon" (it hosted, among others, the Princes of Piedmont and Winston Churchill).

The Villa Landolina, located in the Neapolis district, is also a 19th-century residence. It bears the name of the Landolina family, whose most illustrious member was the archaeologist and naturalist Saverio Landolina (he rediscovered the Syracusan Venus and defended the existence of the spontaneous colony of Arethusan papyrus, also engaging in the debate on who discovered this rare plant). Adjacent to it, within its grounds, the Paolo Orsi Regional Archaeological Museum was built. A large wooded park and tombs of fallen soldiers from other nations complete its complex area.

Villa Reimann, known primarily for its distinctive and extensive garden (covering 35,000 m^{2} of urban land), called the "Garden of the Hesperides," is located near the Tomb of Archimedes necropolis and takes its name from the Danish noblewoman Christiane Reimann, who purchased the property in 1933. (Note: Reimann, in correspondence with the then Ministry of Cultural Heritage, described it thus:...one of the most evocative in Syracuse, overlooking the foot of the gently sloping hill, interrupted by the greenery of gardens and orchards, the cerulean circle of the port, enclosed by the gentle line of hills and far from the blue Ionian Sea.) By her will, the villa is now municipal property. Also noteworthy is Villa Bonanno (also known as a castle due to its imposing appearance), now abandoned, located in Tremilia, a suburb of Syracuse: initially owned by the Scotsman Gould Francis Leckie, who in 1800 obtained the concession of the ancient ecclesiastical land, but having to abandon Sicily (Leckie clashed with the Bourbon sovereigns during the British occupation of Syracuse), the building passed to the Syracusan Bonanno barons.

=== Military architecture ===
The first to be built was the Euryalus Castle (located in the modern district of Belvedere), commissioned by the tyrant Dionysius I of Syracuse as a defensive pivot and connection point for his extensive walls, erected against the assaults of the Carthaginians and other belligerent peoples (Syracuse had just repelled Athens' offensive, necessitating increased defenses for future wars). Archimedes also contributed to the castle's construction, enhancing it with traps for the enemies of the pentapolis. The Euryalus was the military building that, millennia later, was taken as an example by Kaiser Wilhelm II for the tunnel warfare and trench warfare fought by the Germans.

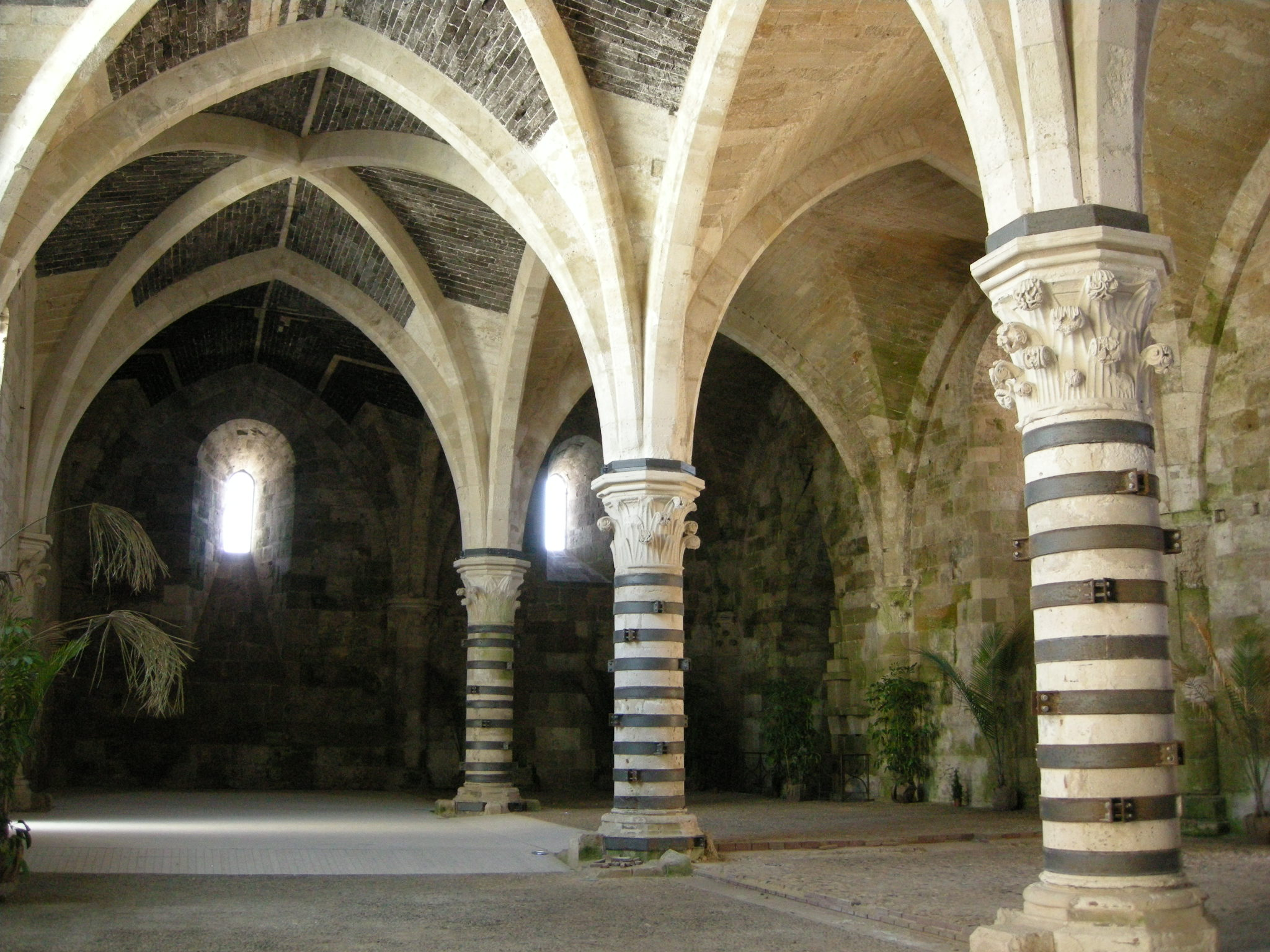
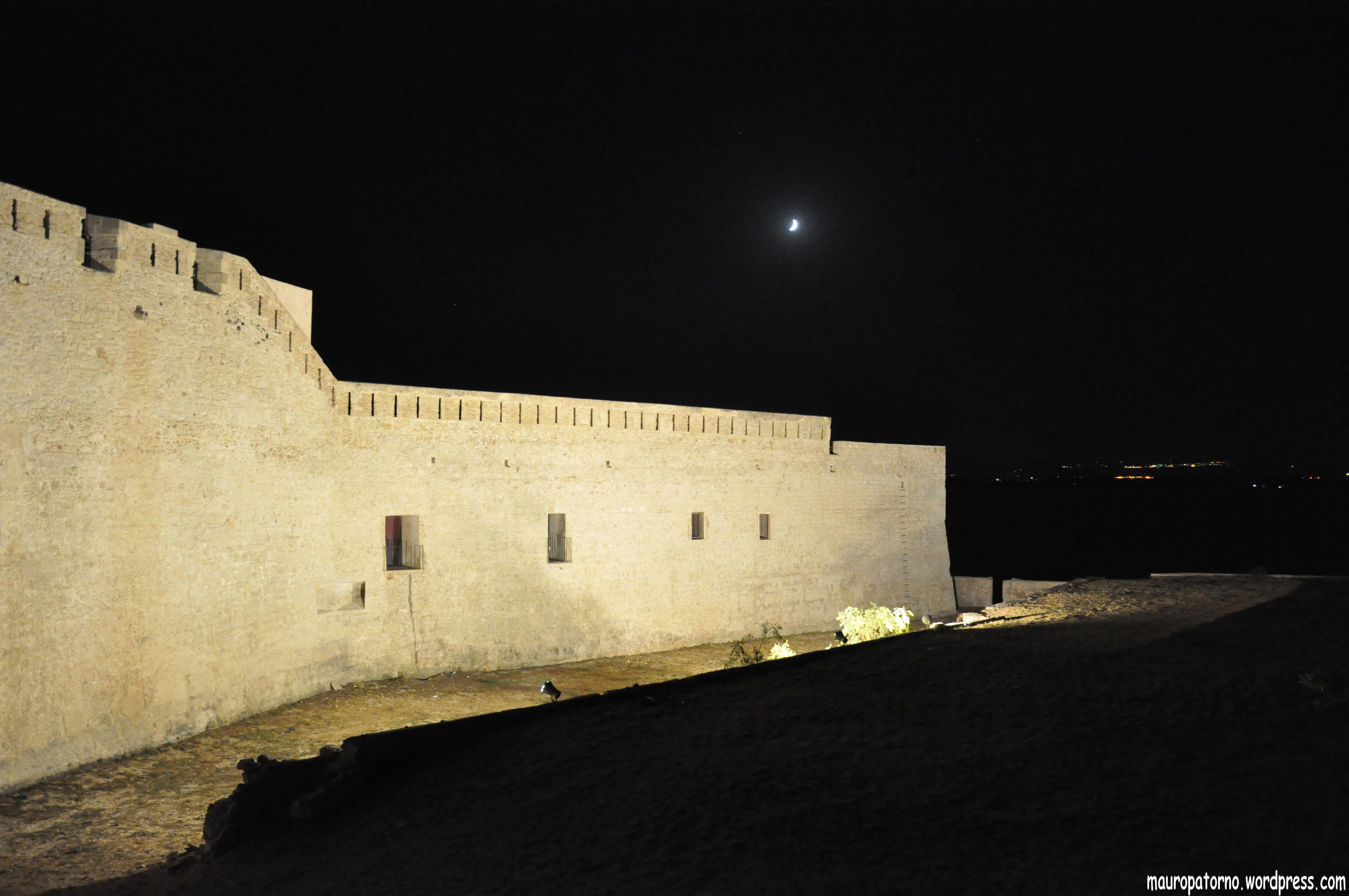
One of the internal halls of the Maniace Castle and one of its external sections facing the sea

In the first half of the 13th century, the Maniace Castle arose, in Gothic style, designed by Frederick II of Swabia on a previous fortress, itself built by the Byzantine general George Maniakes; Frederick named his construction after him. This castle, considered one of the most representative Swabian architectures, played a significant role in the city's medieval military life: used as a prison and to counter pirate raids, but when the Kingdom's sovereigns visited, it could also serve as an elegant court residence.

Over the centuries, Syracuse became increasingly fortified. In the 16th century, under Spanish rule, most Greco-Roman monuments were destroyed (some already damaged by numerous earthquakes) to reuse their stone, building massive bastions and walls that permanently altered the city's appearance.

The fortifications and military regime reached such a level that 17th- and 18th-century Syracuse has been described by modern historians as "a barracks inhabited by civilians," and also the "fortress of Europe," designed to be impregnable. A clear description was provided by the noted 19th-century British traveler Henry Clark Barlow, who noted the numerous military structures one had to pass to enter the city, which closed its gates at sunset, leaving out those who failed to enter in time:

The land-side fortifications are very powerful; one passes over drawbridges through walkways flanked by formidable batteries and commanded by firing positions directed toward the entrance gate; and when you think the fortifications are over, you find you must cross more moats, more walkways, more batteries; and when you hope to have reached the gates, there is still half a mile of trenches in prospect, bridges, moats, and batteries; and when you have passed the gates, the city is still distant, with a bridge and walls to cross.

— Henry Clark Barlow, 1843.

It was not until the late 19th century that the massive military buildings were completely dismantled: of these, the Fort Vigilena (previously called Forte della Gradiglia) and the Fort San Giovannello (formerly Forte della Ferraria) remain prominently visible. Also framed in a military context is the palace that housed the prison during the Bourbon period: its construction was prompted by the increasingly frequent rebellions of Syracusans against the Neapolitan monarchy. Thus, with no space left in the prison behind Piazza del Duomo, the Bourbons built this new structure in 1853. The palace is currently awaiting restoration.

In 1735, the Military Engineers Corps barracks were built, later named after the Syracusan patriot Gaetano Abela. The Abela barracks are located within the Maniace Castle area: until 2001, they housed the Infantry Regiment and the Sapper Engineers, then became the university residence for the architecture faculty.

As the city expanded, so did its military architecture: in the decade before World War II, Syracuse saw the construction of the seaplane base (now home to the 34th Radar Group of the Air Force), followed by the battery Lamba Doria, occupying 48,000 m^{2} in the southern part of the Maddalena Peninsula. Numerous bunkers were built, scattered throughout, along with an underground fuel depot for the Syracuse Royal Air Force.

Also tied to World War II is the Santa Panagia battery, incorporated into the vast area of the Syracuse naval base and protected as a military archaeological asset. Additionally, of historical-military interest is the hypogeum of Piazza Duomo, as this long tunnel (running from the cathedral site to the Foro Italico, near the Marina) was one of the main shelters for the population during the bombings of the last conflict.

Another prevalent military architectural feature in Syracuse is its towers: the municipal area has many (a legacy of a bellicose past focused on sighting and territorial defense); the main ten are: Ognina Tower, Cuba Tower, Milocca Tower, Tonda Tower, Landolina Tower, Teatro Greco Tower, Pizzuta Tower, Targia Tower, Bosco Minniti Tower, and Modica Tower. Special mention among the towers goes to the symbolic structure of the Belvedere district: called u Semafuru (the Semaphore), a 19th-century military construction with a crenelated tower, which until 1955 had a bright antenna on top communicating in Morse code with ships passing or approaching the Port of Augusta and Port of Syracuse.

=== Other ===
In the Cappuccini Square (next to the convent of the same name and the quarry of the same name), the municipality of Syracuse is home to the Monument to the Italians Fallen in Africa, dating back to the Fascist period but assembled decades after the regime's fall. The monument commemorates soldiers who died on the African continent during the colonial war. Inside, there is a chapel dedicated to the legionnaire, while outside, a plaque was recently added to commemorate the victims of the sinking of the liner Conte Rosso, which occurred near the monument's location.

The city has three historic lighthouses: the green Maniace Castle lighthouse (with green light), dominating the castle's promontory; the red Massolivieri lighthouse, built on an old rural house, signaling the Maddalena Peninsula promontory; and the Capo Murro di Porco lighthouse, casting its white light over the cape that bears its name, the most famous Syracusan lighthouse and one of the most important light signals in eastern Sicily: it also appears in the miniseries The Island of Secrets - Korè. The state property office included this lighthouse among the first nine in Italy leased to be transformed into characteristic hotels while continuing to serve as maritime signals.

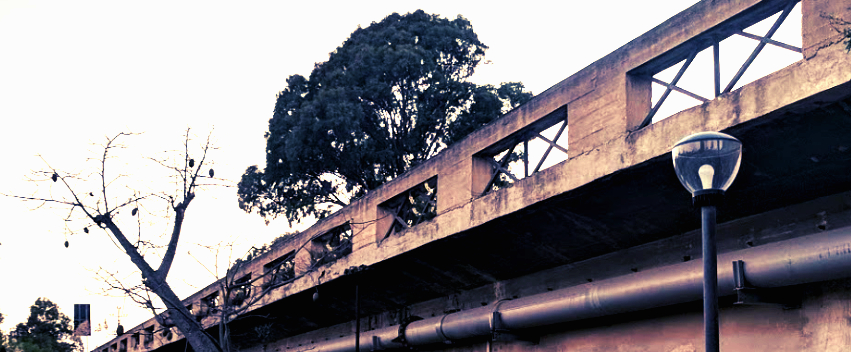
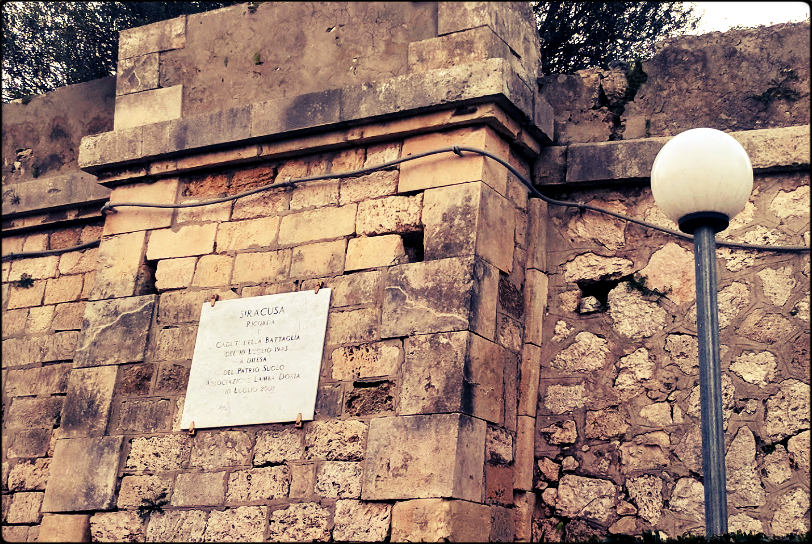
The ancient bridge over the Anapo river, where the clash between Italians and British occurred during the Second World War for the capture of the city on 10 July 1943.

Partly located on an island and crossed by rivers and canals on one side, Syracuse has built several bridges over its long history; the municipality connects Ortygia to the rest of the city via two bridges, the most monumental of which is called the Umbertino Bridge, named after King Umberto I, who reigned when it was built. The southern entrance is marked by a bridge that spans the beds of the Ciane and Anapo rivers; previously, the latter river was crossed by another stone bridge where the battle against the British took place on 10 July 1943. Another significant bridge connects the coastal road from the Fontane Bianche area to Cassibile, crossing the mouth of one of the main Hyblaean rivers.

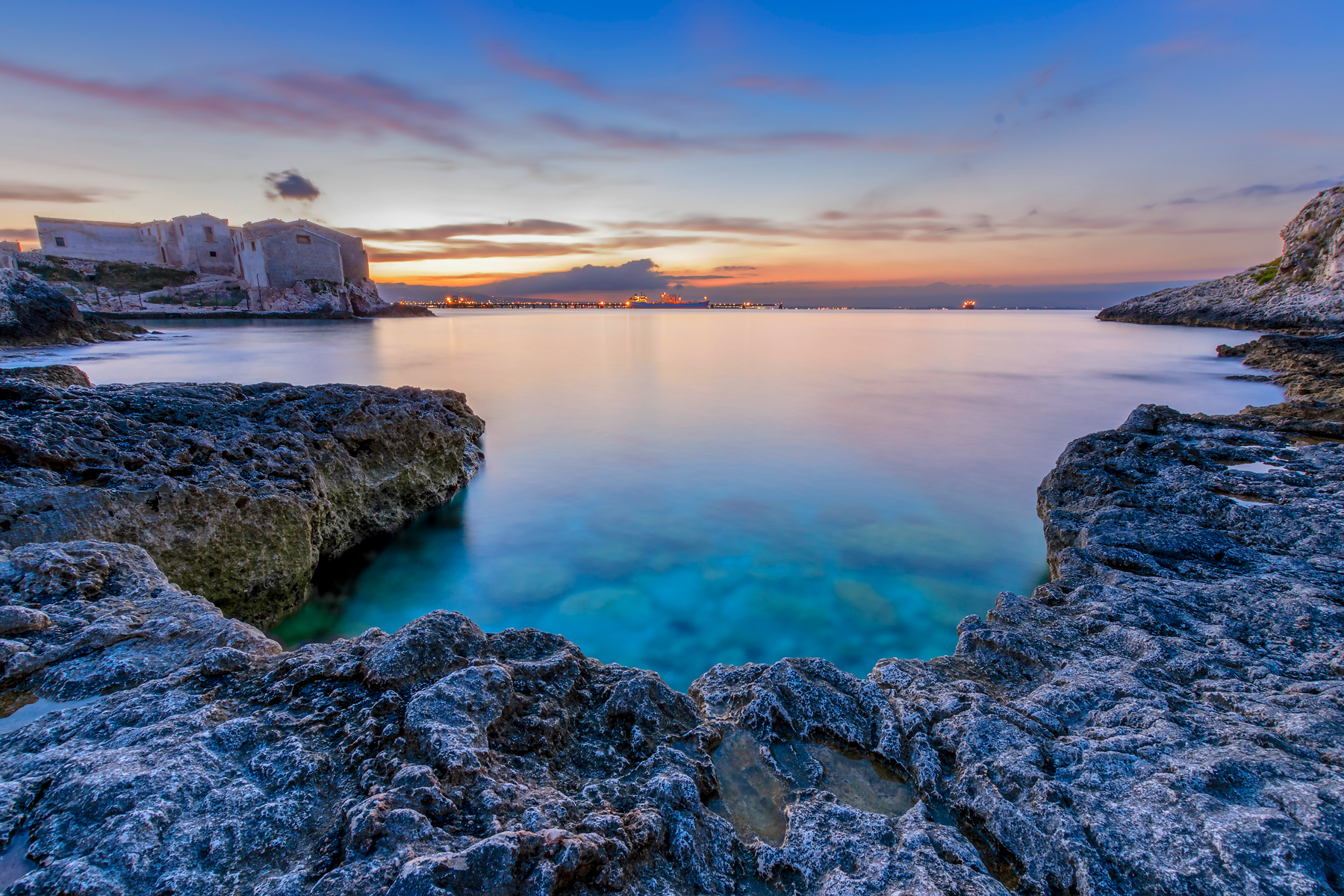
The Santa Panagia bay with the homonymous tuna fishery visible on the left side of the image

The Fountain of Arethusa and the surrounding architectural structure are among the most visited sites in Syracuse: over the centuries, it has undergone many changes in appearance. It has been surrounded by large fortifications, hosted papyrus plants in its waters, and served as a washhouse for Syracusan women in post-classical times. Additionally, several sculptural works are concentrated on the island: the most prominent is the 20th-century Fountain of Diana, which depicts the main elements of the legend of the river god Alpheus, the nymph Arethusa, and her protector, Artemis (the Roman Diana). Also part of Syracuse's architectural heritage is the ancient Santa Panagia tuna fishery, of medieval origins (founded around 1100), which, with varying fortunes, remained active until the 1950s of the 20th century.

=== Archaeological sites ===
Throughout the Syracuse region, significant archaeological evidence can be observed. In addition to the aforementioned sacred temple areas, the city boasts one of the Mediterranean's most extensive archaeological environments, enclosed in a park named after the district where it is located: the Neapolis Archaeological Park. Covering 240,000 m^{2} of urban area, it contains some of the most impressive testimonies of Greco-Roman Syracuse:

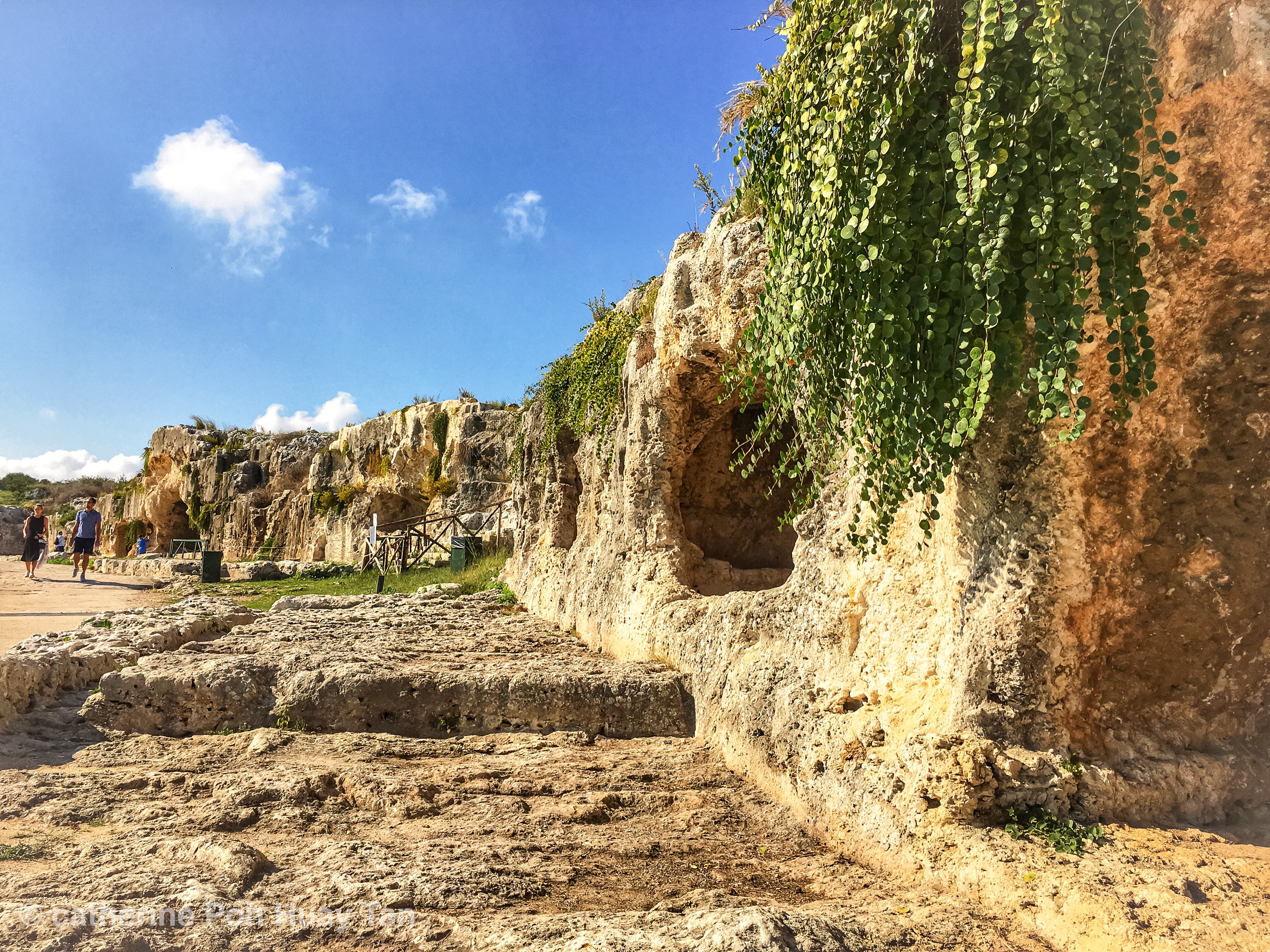
Behind the Greek Theatre; the tombs of the Via dei Sepolcri

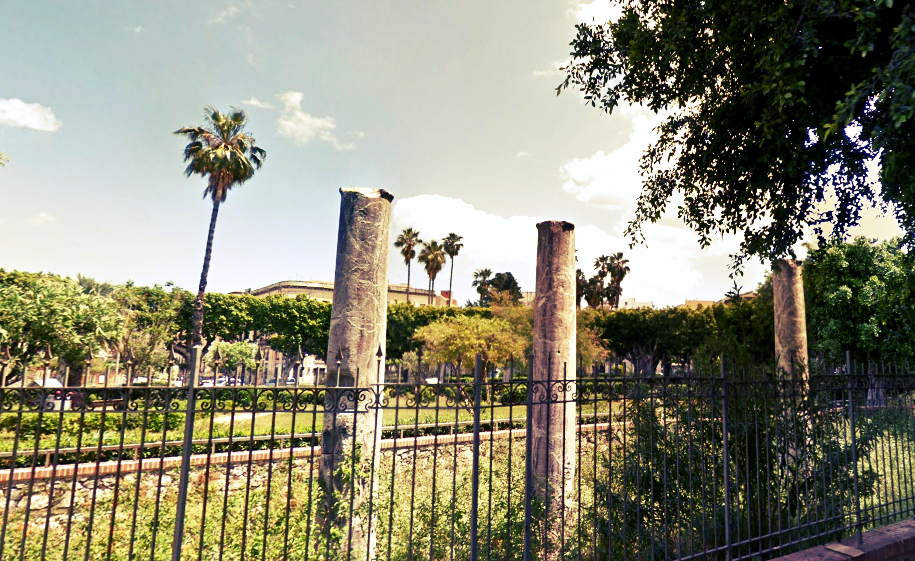
The surviving columns of the Syracusan Forum

- The Greek Theatre, used for public entertainment but also for political assemblies (there stands the last of the Galerme mills).
- The Grotta del Ninfeo, where the waters of the Anapo flow and where actors once prepared before performing in the theatre.
- The Roman amphitheatre; in Syracuse's, aquatic spectacles were staged alongside gladiator fights.
- The Ear of Dionysius, so named by Caravaggio during his stay in Syracuse. It is believed to have been a Greek prison.

Within the archaeological park, there are also interesting tomb complexes: the Via dei Sepolcri (where the cult of Heroes was paid to the deceased), the Roman sarcophagi near the amphitheatre, and the Grotticelli necropolis, whose most significant feature is the presumed tomb of Archimedes, so-called because the period and location of the excavation do not align with accounts of the mathematician's death and burial: according to Cicero, he was buried south of Syracuse, possibly near the Ciane river, but the loss of the original tomb (marked by a sphere and cylinder) and centuries of tradition have consecrated this site as the symbolic tomb of the most famous ancient Syracusan.

Necropolises are the most prevalent structural element in Syracuse's archaeological sites: the area is famous for the Sicilian peculiarity of carving their tombs in the shape of a beehive: Pantalica is the prime example, but this ancient practice is also found in Syracuse's limestone walls. There are twelve groups of necropolises from the 8th century BC to the Byzantine era; among the largest and oldest (besides the aforementioned Grotticelli) are the Fusco necropolis to the southwest, the Ospedale Civile and Santa Panagia necropolises in the center, and the large perimeter of the Targia necropolis to the north.

Other significant sites include the Syracusan Forum (the ancient agora of the pentapolis, later a forum) and the monuments composing the Roman Gymnasium.

Among the remains of the oldest civilizations are: to the north, the archaeological sites of Stentinello and the Thapsos peninsula, and to the south, Ognina, which, besides showing signs of archaic contacts with Malta's inhabitants, preserves the architectural remains of subsequent historical periods.

=== Religious architecture of the ancient polis ===
The earliest religious architectural evidence dates back to the prehistoric era, while the religiosity of the ancient Greeks led to the construction of imposing votive areas in the city, such as the Altar of Hieron (the largest of its time) and numerous temples, the most significant and best-preserved being the Temple of Athena (converted into a church with the advent of Christianity).

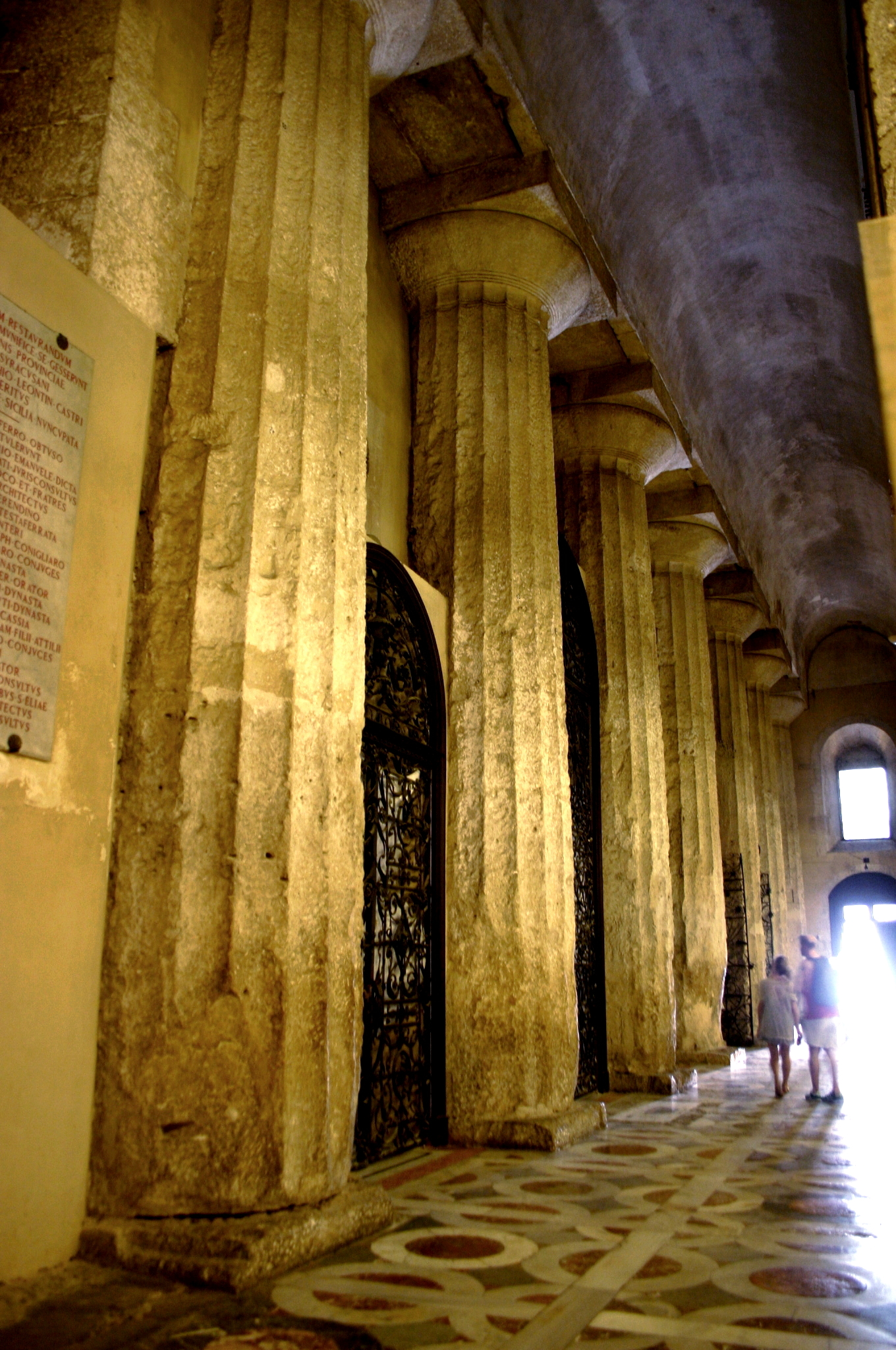
The columns of the Temple of Athena incorporated into the structure of the Syracuse Cathedral (about 2,500 years old)

The oldest temple in Syracuse is the one built for the sun god Apollo: dating to the 6th century BC, it is also the oldest Sicilian temple in Doric style dedicated to this deity and is located on the island of Ortygia, which, according to the ancient Syracusans, was given to Apollo's twin, Artemis. For the lunar goddess, the Artemision was built (next to the temple of the goddess of wisdom, Athena); Cicero described it as the most prestigious of Syracuse's ancient temples.

Also in the 6th century BC, in the countryside facing the sea, between the island of Ortygia and the Maddalena Peninsula, the Temple of Olympian Zeus was built, called by the Syracusans "the two columns" (the only architectural element still clearly visible); it is a tangible testament to the link between ancient Syracuse and the site of the sacred Olympic games.

On the road that once led to the sub-colony of Helorus - hence called Via Elorina - stands the monumental complex known as the Roman Gymnasium of Syracuse, within which the remains of a temple of uncertain dedication (possibly to Egyptian deities) can be observed, described by Cicero in his chronicles.

The polis was also famous for being the main center for the Sicilian cult of the chthonic deities Demeter and Kore, to whom a large votive area near Piazza della Vittoria was dedicated. Other votive areas dedicated to Mother Earth and her daughter were scattered throughout the city. Numerous other temple remains dedicated to the Olympians and minor deities, significant to the geographical area, are distributed across the urban and extra-urban territory.

=== Religious architecture ===
==== Christian architecture ====
The places of worship of the Christian religion constitute the majority of Syracuse's artistic-religious heritage. Many structures have historical significance, some even represented by natural caves, such as liturgical caves. (Note: Notable religious caves include the so-called Grotta Santa, from which the district of the same name takes its name, and the oratory of Santa Panagia, located in a natural cave by the sea.) The former Greek temple, now the Cathedral of the Nativity of the Blessed Virgin Mary, commonly known as the Duomo, is among the most archaic and notable architectural structures of early Christianity, evolving slowly over time.

Tradition holds that the second oldest Catholic building in Syracuse after the Cathedral is the Church of San Giovannello (dedicated to John the Baptist), built in the Giudecca district. Also ancient is the Church of San Giovanni alle Catacombe, which, during Islamic domination, reportedly took on the role of the cathedral. The building lacks its roof, destroyed by natural disasters, and serves as the entrance to one of the largest catacombs in Syracuse (together with those in Rome, the most extensive in the world), that of San Giovanni. Beneath this church lies the crypt presumed to house the relics of the protobishop Marcian.

Dating to the Norman era are the Church of San Nicolò ai Cordari (overlying a Paleochristian building), the Church of San Martino, and the Church of Santa Lucia al Sepolcro, whose adjacent rotunda, as the name suggests, was built in the 17th century to serve as the sepulchre of the city's patron saint (whose mortal remains, however, remained in Venice, after being taken by the Byzantines). The Church of Santa Lucia alla Badia is another important structure dedicated to the patron saint.

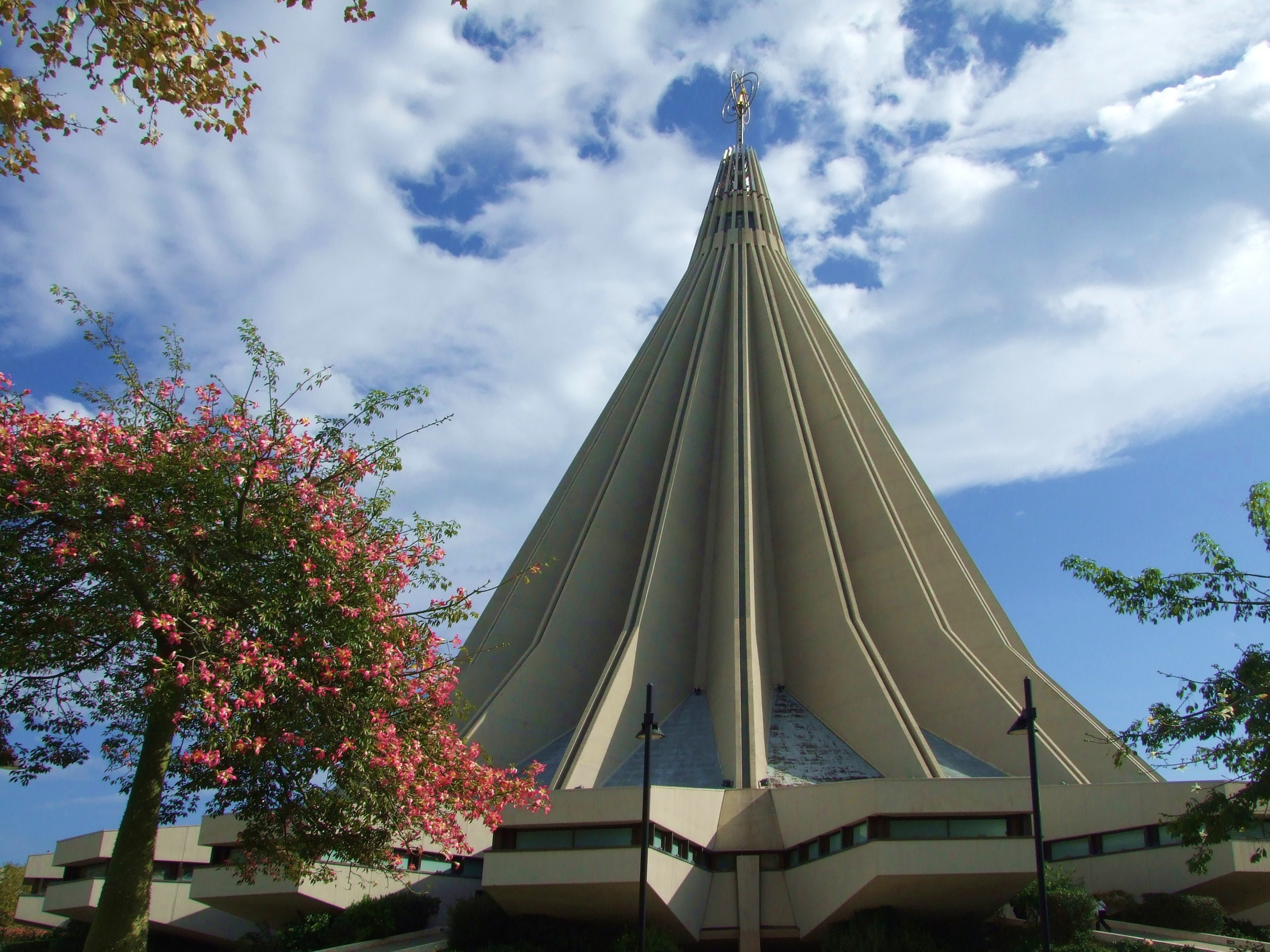
The Basilica Sanctuary of Our Lady of Tears

Of particular interest are the churches belonging to the Knights of Malta: their first church was that of San Sebastianello (Saint Sebastian, the co-patron saint of the Syracusans), later moving to the Church of Saints Blaise and Leonard; of the first, built in the Byzantine era, the crypt next to the prehistoric temple is visitable, while of the second, dating to the 1500s, only the external facade overlooking the Knights of Malta Square is visible.

Among the 20th century constructions, the Pantheon of Syracuse stands out, housing the remains of World War I fallen soldiers, and the Sanctuary of Our Lady of Tears, built to commemorate the miraculous Marian event of 1953: the conical-shaped sanctuary is the city's highest church, visible from a considerable distance.

Within the perimeter of the Villa Landolina (museum site) is also a small non-Catholic cemetery, containing the remains of the German poet August von Platen and some British and American fallen soldiers from the Napoleonic period.

==== Architecture of other religions ====
The city also is home to structures of other religions. The most notable is the mikveh, dating to the Byzantine era, often described as the largest and oldest Jewish ritual bath in Europe.

== Culture ==
=== Education ===
==== Libraries and bookstores ====
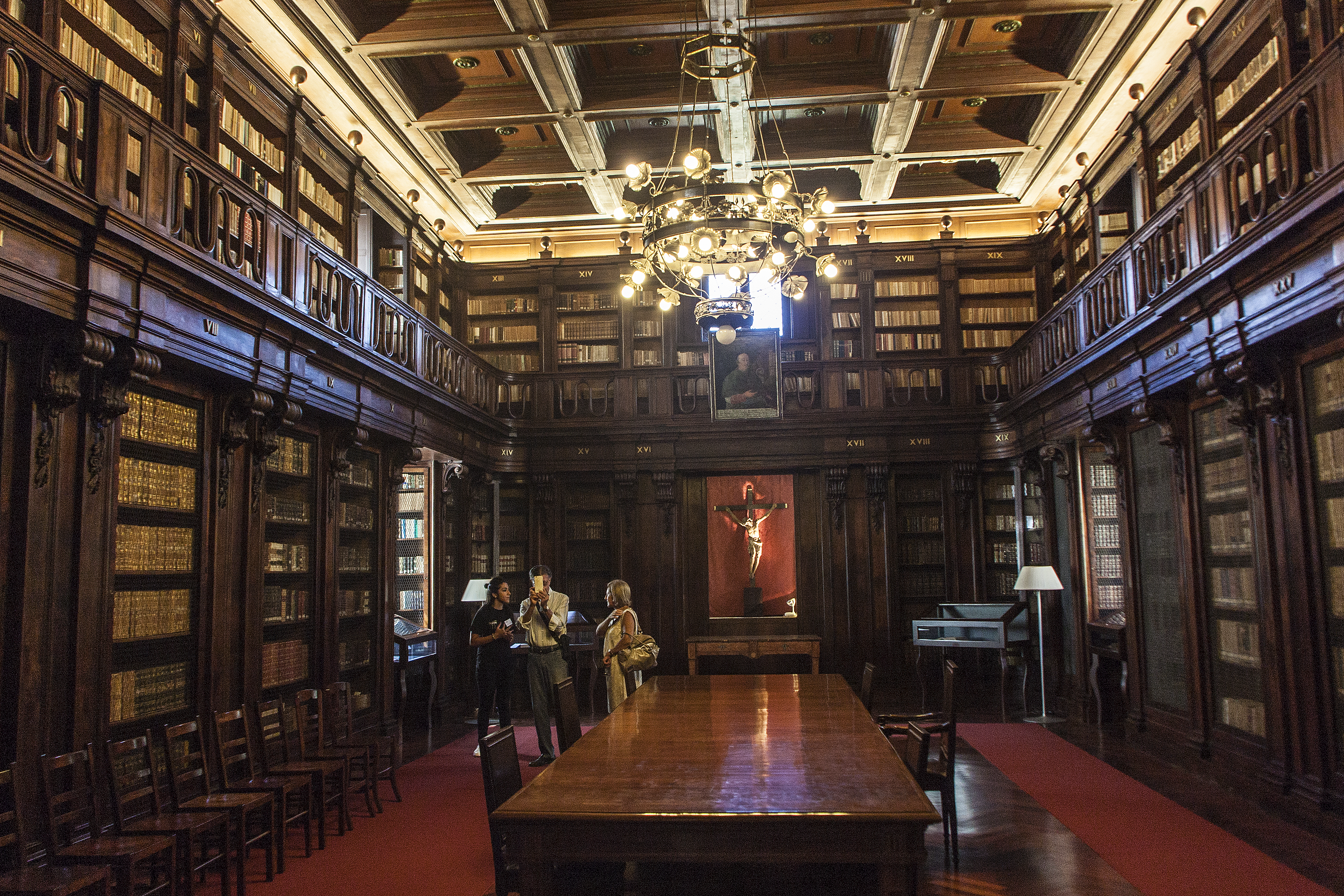
The Alagonian Library is the oldest library in Syracuse, located in the archbishop's palace. Named after its founder Giovanni Battista Alagona

The city is home to several libraries, the oldest of which dates back to 1780 (as earlier ones did not survive past looting and natural disasters), named the Archiepiscopal Alagonian library, founded by Bishop Giovanni Battista Alagona. It houses a paper collection of 60,000 books. The largest is the city's municipal library, established in 1867, which holds approximately 70,000 volumes.

Among the Aretusean bookstores, the Casa del libro Rosario Mascali has been recognized, for the first time in Sicily, as "a cultural asset," listed among Italy's historic bookstores. Notable Sicilian writers such as Quasimodo, Sciascia, and Vittorini have frequented it.

==== Research ====
In 2015, Syracuse was selected by the National Research Council (CNR) project to become Italy's first smart city 2.0. Previously, in 2012, it had participated in the IBM Smarter Cities Challenge, selected alongside 32 other cities worldwide.

==== Schools, universities, academies ====
The municipality of Syracuse has 150 schools fulfilling compulsory education (from kindergarten to secondary school). Among its most distinctive upper secondary schools, as a maritime city, is the Nautical Institute (one of seven in Sicily and about forty in Italy), founded in 1944 and named after the patriot Alessandro Rizza (formerly Gaetano Arezzo della Targia). It has signed an agreement (managed by the Workers' Training School of the Maritime Military Arsenal) – the first of its kind in Italy – for school-work alternation with the Italian Navy. As a city with a strong tourism vocation, Syracuse's education system dedicates significant attention to training in the tourism services sector: the capital has three such institutes (which, combined with the other three in the municipal consortium, form one of the highest concentrations of tourism schools on the island).

Although Syracuse is one of the oldest and currently most populous urban centers in Sicily, it does not have its own university (due to historical reasons originating in the post-ancient era (Note: The first three and only public university seats in Sicily were established during the 1400s and 1500s, at a time when there was contention for the title of capital between Palermo and Messina (and to a lesser extent Catania). Syracuse, which after the Arab conquest had lost its status as the capital of all Sicily, impoverished and excluded from economic power struggles, became a military stronghold in those centuries, dedicated to the continuous defense of the Kingdom, far from being able to establish a center of studies.)). However, it can boast two significant and unique distinctions related to university history: it was from Syracuse that the decree establishing the oldest state university in Europe, the University of Naples Federico II, was issued, desired by Emperor Frederick II of Swabia in 1224, when his court resided within the walls of Syracuse; furthermore, the oldest graduate in Sicily, the Syracusan Antonio Mantello, who obtained a degree in civil law at the nearby University of Catania on 19 November 1449, also hails from this city. It was not until 1996 that a branch of the architecture faculty of the University of Catania was inaugurated in Syracuse. The online universities Pegaso and Niccolò Cusano have recently opened their branches in the city.

In the theological field, the San Metodio Higher Institute of Religious Sciences, founded in 1977 and dedicated to the Syracusan who became Patriarch of Constantinople, offers a degree in religious sciences. Additionally, the city is home to the Rosario Gagliardi Academy of Fine Arts (dedicated to the Syracusan Baroque architect), the Anea naturopathy academy, and the Academy of English (a Cambridge exam center and a monitored body of the DITALS center of the Università per Stranieri di Siena).

The Mediterranean Center for Arts and Sciences (MCAS) of Arcadia University (whose main private campus is in Pennsylvania) is a program for American students residing in Syracuse; it contributed to the establishment of the Sicily Center for International Education (SCIE), founded in 2015 in Ortygia, which offers foreign students the opportunity to learn about Italian culture through summer study programs and collaboration with other national and international institutes operating in the area. Also dedicated to foreign students is The Italian Academy (Italian Language and Culture Centre), established in 1984 in the area of the San Giovanni catacombs and the basilica above it.

Syracuse also is home to an academic specialization school in Archaeological Heritage, founded in 1925, which is unique in both Sicily and Southern Italy. Its direction was initially entrusted to the archaeologist Paolo Orsi. The city is also the original seat of the psychotherapy institute of Gestalt HCC Italy (Gestalt Human Communication Center Italy), founded in 1979, which began its university history in Italy from this territory.

==== Foundations and associations ====
The NPO foundation of the INDA (acronym for National Institute of Ancient Drama), which includes the academy of ancient drama, was established in Syracuse in 1914. It is one of the longest-standing and most renowned theater schools for dramatic art. Thanks to it, after 2,400 years, the city's Greek theater has resumed hosting tragedies and comedies written for the first time in antiquity, while also promoting various artistic-cultural activities and taking its performances and actors across Italy and abroad (e.g., INDA at the Teatro Grande in Pompeii and at the cultural festival in Athens).

The city is also a significant global reference point for the study of criminal sciences and criminal law, due to the presence of the Siracusa International Institute (until 2017 known as ISISC – International Higher Institute of Criminal Sciences), a non-profit foundation established in 1972 that holds special consultative status with the United Nations. Among the institute's most significant actions is the conference where experts drafted the first text of the United Nations Convention Against Torture, adopted by all UN member states. The Siracusa International Institute, which aims to protect human rights, combat transnational organized crime, and uphold the rule of law, has always organized international advanced training courses in criminal law, conducted technical assistance programs abroad, and developed various research projects, primarily focused on countering organized crime. Its headquarters, dedicated to its founder and president Mahmoud Cherif Bassiouni, also houses the OPCO (Permanent Observatory on Organized Crime), an organ of the presidency of the Sicilian region and local territorial bodies. The Siracusa International Institute also hosts a library collection of 24,000 volumes focused on criminology and human rights from various countries.

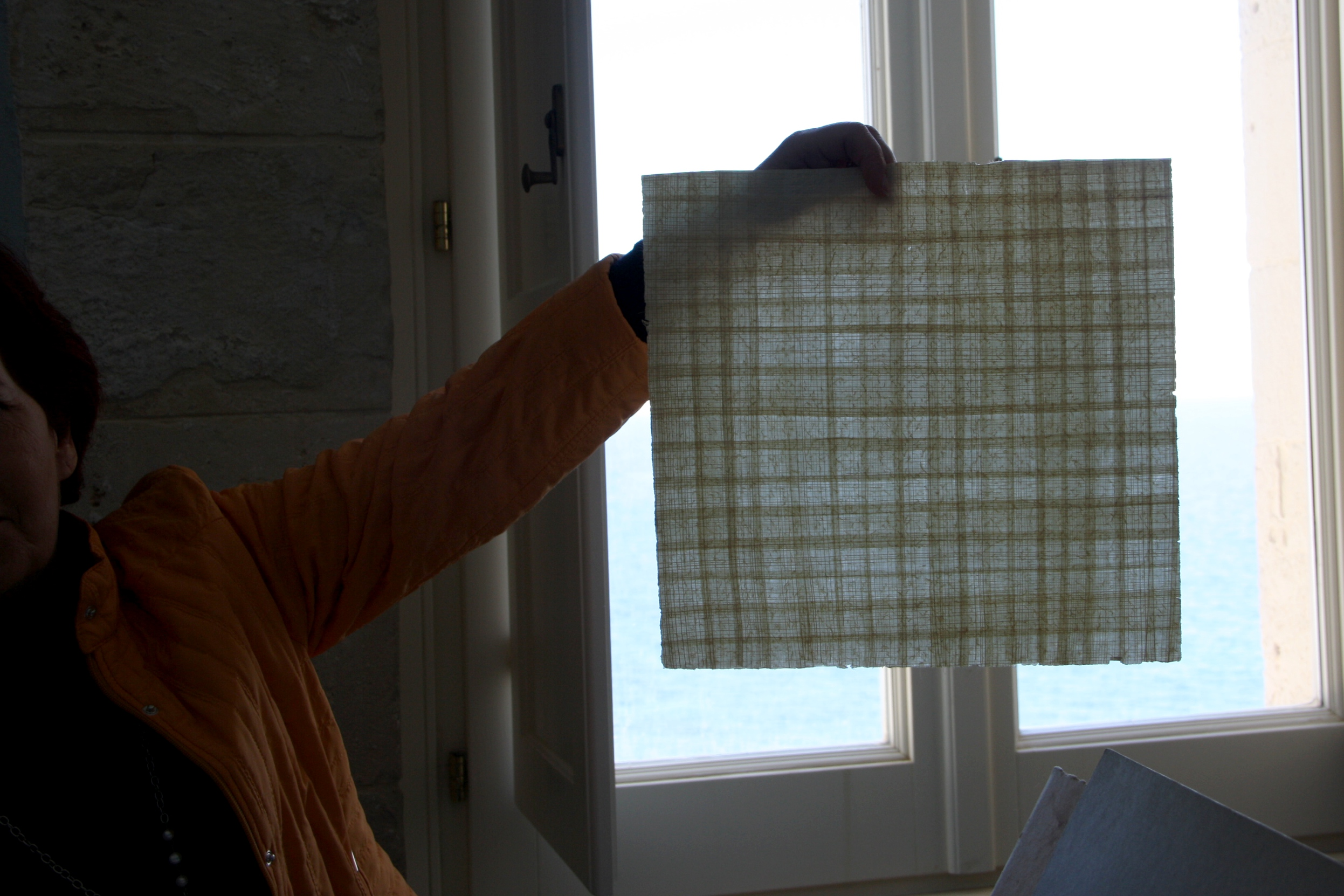
Papyrus produced at the International Papyrus Institute, located within the museum area dedicated to the rare plant

Given the city's special relationship with the papyrus plant (Syracuse is the only city in Europe where it grows naturally), the Italian Institute for Egyptian Civilization (I.I.C.E.) was founded in Syracuse with its main headquarters in the city; this foundation was influenced by the established presence in Syracuse of the International Papyrus Institute, which has been dedicated since 1987 to the study and restoration of ancient Egyptian papyri. It is twinned with the Bibliotheca Alexandrina, managed the "Papyrus Restoration Laboratory" at the Egyptian Museum, participated in excavation campaigns in the land of the pharaohs, and hosts Egyptologists from around the world in Syracuse for conferences and seminars.

In 1984, to promote Baroque architecture, the International Center for Baroque Studies (CISB) was established in the city, which was one of the main contributors to the inclusion of the Late Baroque Towns of the Val di Noto in the UNESCO list. Syracuse is also the seat of the first Sicilian Hub: The Hub Syracuse (also known as The Hub Sicily), part of the Euro-South Hub.

The city is also culturally active in the field of sociopolitical pacification through the AIEP (International Association for Peace Education), chaired by the Scicli native and Syracuse resident by adoption Bruno Fucili (thirteen-time Nobel Peace Prize nominee), who has organized the international conference on Peace Education in the Aretusean municipality for over twenty years. Thanks to these initiatives, Syracuse was declared, in 1995, a "city for peace and human rights." Among the memorable events of these Aretusean conferences is the visit in 1999 of Muhammad Ali, who signed documents in the city for a peace treaty in Burundi, where a civil war was raging.

Furthermore, young doctors from across the Mediterranean regularly gather in the city to specialize, utilizing the Euro Mediterranean Rehabilitation Summer School (E.M.R.S.S.), managed by the Syracusan association dedicated to physical medicine and rehabilitation.

==== Museums ====
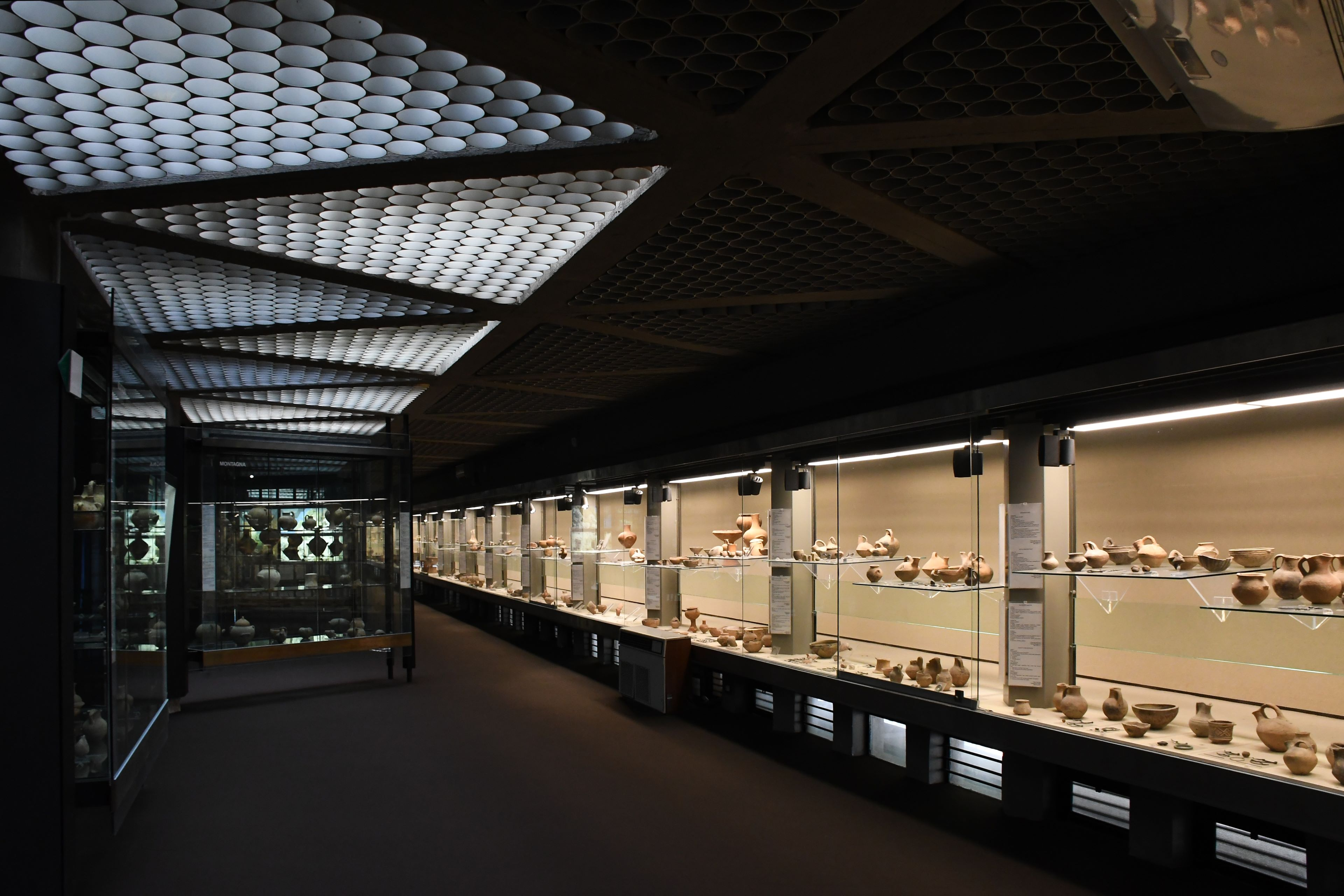
Showcases with vases, cups, and kraters from ancient Sicily (Paolo Orsi Regional Archaeological Museum)

- The Paolo Orsi Regional Archaeological Museum is one of the most important archaeological museums in Europe.
- The Papyrus Museum is dedicated to preserving and caring for the rare papyrus plant, collaborating with significant locations for this plant, such as the city of Cairo.
- The Regional Gallery, known as the Bellomo Museum, displays artifacts from the medieval and modern eras of the city.
- The INDA museum organizes temporary exhibitions dedicated to the history of the classical performances at the Greek Theatre of Syracuse.
- The Aretusean Puppet Museum showcases the art of the Opera dei Pupi, declared by UNESCO a Oral and Intangible Heritage of Humanity.
- The Syracuse Cinema Museum is the third largest of its kind in Italy.
- The Archimedes Technopark, covering an exhibition area of 1,700 square metres (18,000 sq ft), displays replicas of war machines used in the 3rd century BC and authentic technological instruments designed by Archimedes.
- The Sirmuma Sea Museum showcases Syracuse's maritime history.
- The small Syracuse Tropical Aquarium, located within the Fountain of Arethusa, is dedicated to Mediterranean marine life and tropical fauna.
- At the Eurialo Castle site, an antiquarium has been set up, housing valuable artifacts from the military life of the Dionysian construction and its continuation through subsequent centuries (until the castle was last used).
- The Wunderkammer, which houses the nineteenth-century collection of the naturalist Alessandro Rizza.
- Hyblaean Karst Museum.
- Diocesan Museum.
- Museum of Illusions.
- Syracuse Twentieth Century Museum.
- Siramuse Multimedia Museum.
- Montevergini Civic Gallery of Contemporary Art.
- Botanical Garden.
- Astronomical Observatory.

=== Press and media ===
The city is home to local editions of Giornale di Sicilia, La Sicilia, and Gazzetta del Sud, the fortnightly opinion magazine La Civetta di Minerva (winner of the 2012 Mario Francese National Award), and the radio station Radio FM Italia.

=== Cinema ===
The city has served as an open-air film set for numerous films, attracting many prominent figures from the film world, such as Harrison Ford, Phoebe Waller-Bridge, Mads Mikkelsen, James Mangold, Peter Dinklage, Ben Mendelsohn, Joe Wright, Vittorio De Sica, Mario Monicelli, Nino Manfredi, the duo Franco and Ciccio, the Taviani brothers, Walter Chiari, Monica Bellucci, Giuseppe Tornatore, and many others.

Among the most significant titles are: Casanova '70; Rosolino Paternò, soldato; Secondo Ponzio Pilato; The Most Beautiful Couple in the World; The Voyage; Marianne and Juliane; Kaos; The Star Maker; Sicilia!; Malèna; Nati stanchi; Letters from Sicily; Inspector Montalbano; The Moon's Child; Caravaggio; Cyrano; Indiana Jones and the Dial of Destiny.

The history of the city has also been the subject or inspiration for various films, such as the silent film Damon and Pythias, followed by the remake Damon and Pythias (1914 film), the peplum films Siege of Syracuse, Damon and Pythias, Hercules and the Tyrants of Babylon (the last film in which Reg Park played Hercules), the animated film Sinbad: Legend of the Seven Seas (the last DreamWorks film with traditional animation), and the fifth and final chapter of the Indiana Jones series, Indiana Jones and the Dial of Destiny by James Mangold.

Syracuse hosts two annual film festivals with national and international circuits: the Ares International Film and Media Festival, in its seventh edition, and the Ortigia Film Festival, in its eighth edition, which have seen the participation of artists such as Margareth Madè, Nino Frassica, Mario Venuti, Krzysztof Zanussi, and Pietro Marcello. These festivals have been joined by the "Tonino Accolla Award," a contest in honor of the Syracusan voice actor (the Italian voice of Eddie Murphy, Jim Carrey, Ben Stiller, Tim Curry, and many others).

=== Theatre ===
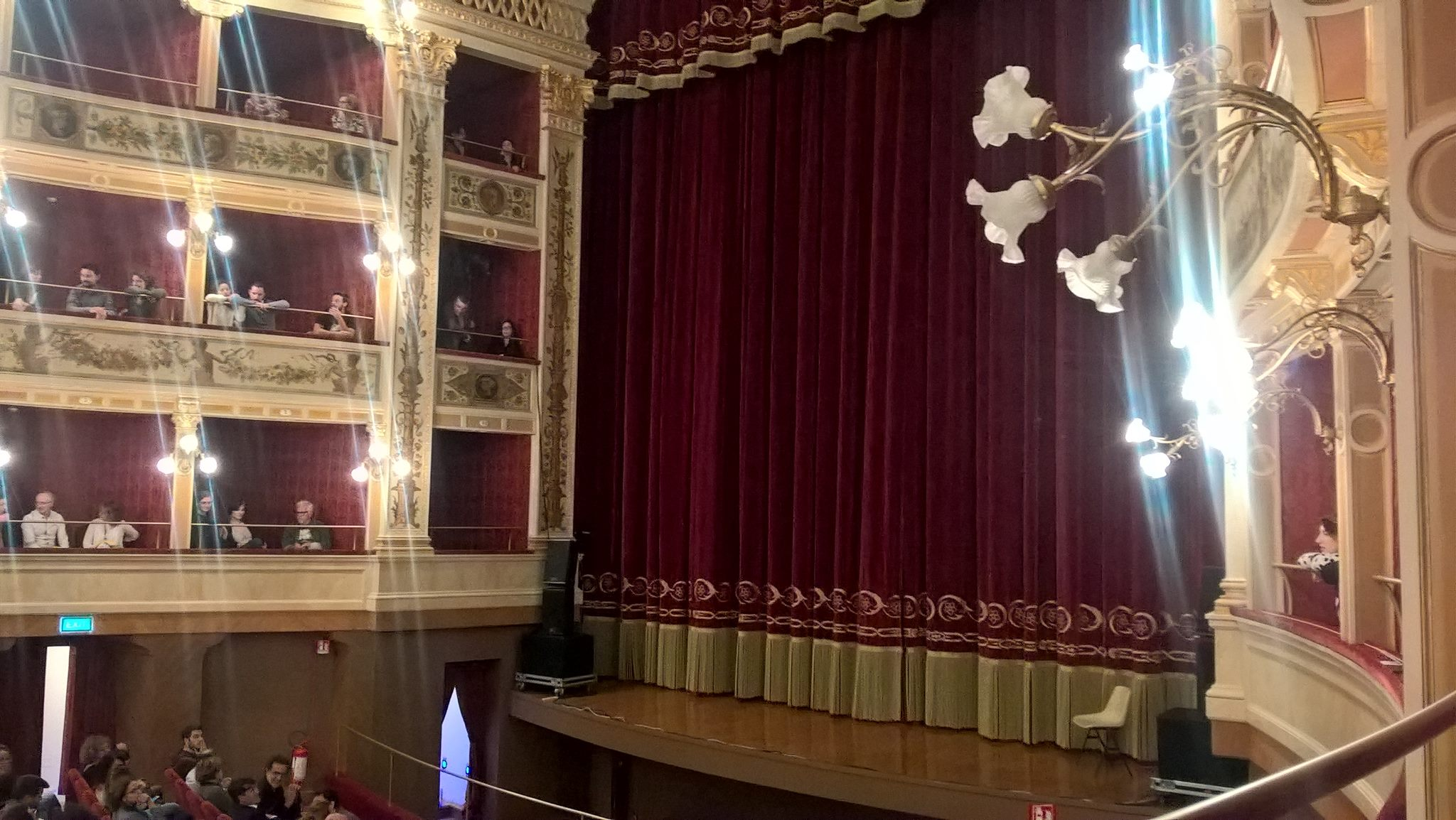
The municipal theatre of the city

Syracuse was one of the first cities in the world to develop the form of theatrical art. While Athens is typically associated with the birth of dramatic art, the origin of comic art is attributed to the polis of Syracuse, due to the words of Plato, who in the Theaetetus (Plato, Theaet., 152e) defines the Syracusan Epicharmus as "the founder of comedy" (or also "the prince of comedy"), comparing him to Homer – whom he calls "the founder of tragedy" –, those of Alcimus in To Amyntas, and due to its Greek theatre; one of the largest and most significant theatres of antiquity. Its stage hosted Aeschylus, Phormis, Antiphon, and other great names. The glory of the Greek theatre is relived through the classical performances organized annually by the INDA.

In the modern era, indoor theatre buildings emerged, such as the Syracuse municipal theatre (19th century) and the Vasquez Theatre. Within the Cappuccini Quarry, the Teatro di Verdura is located, where internationally renowned actors have performed. The city also is home to a puppet theatre, called the Syracuse Small Puppet Theatre, which stages the Sicilian tradition of the Opera dei Pupi.

=== Art ===
The history of art in Syracuse is extremely diverse. From the Greek era comes one of the most appreciated art forms of the ancient city: its coinage.

The coins of Syracuse deserve to be considered among the most beautiful in the world.

These coins are now scattered around the globe, but a portion remains preserved in Syracuse. Modern philately has celebrated the Aretusean mint by issuing the series called Siracusana, as has the Italian lira, which circulated the state banknote featuring the face of Arethusa.

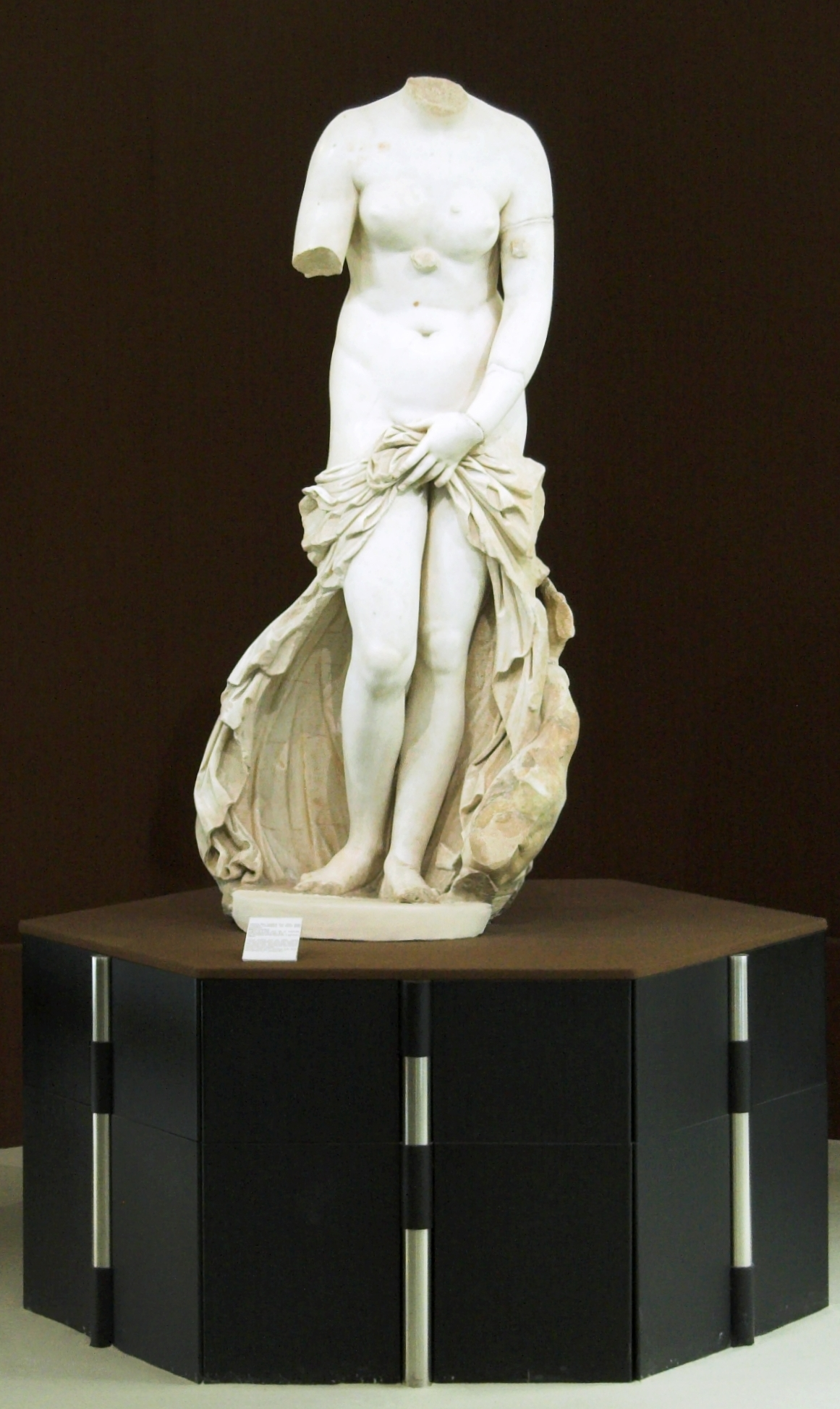
The Landolina Venus

As an ancient, prestigious cultural center, the polis attracted brilliant minds, fostering every type of art. When the city was conquered by the Romans, they were astonished by the cultural and artistic achievements of the Syracusan Greeks; scholars believe that the importation of Syracusan treasures marked the beginning of luxuria among the Romans.

The conquest of Syracuse was a pivotal moment in bringing Latin culture closer to Greek culture (initially opposed by the Romans). Marcus Claudius Marcellus plundered so many Syracusan artworks that, once brought to Rome and placed in a temple, they are said to have constituted the first museum of the city.

Believe me, the statues brought from Syracuse are harmful to this city.
Infesta mihi credite signa ab Syracusis illata sunt hunc urbi.

— Cato the Elder in Livy, I, 34, 3.

The architectural composition of the city well reflects the history of the peoples who succeeded one another: the Normans, who made it an active center of Norman Romanesque art during the period of the County of Sicily; the Holy Roman Empire and subsequent medieval dynasties, with extensive Gothic-style construction. The modern era is characterized by a Flemish and Renaissance imprint under the Spanish domination, and after the devastating earthquake of 1693, much of the city was rebuilt in the elaborate Baroque style, which is why Syracuse, along with other cities of the Val di Noto, is considered a prime example of Sicilian Baroque, also hosting an international center for Baroque studies. Neoclassicism was introduced, as in the rest of Sicily, by French artists. The nineteenth century saw the succession of European styles, always with a local flavor, including neo-Gothic, eclecticism, and more. The Liberty style triumphed between the late nineteenth and early twentieth centuries, particularly in Syracuse. Art Deco and other styles such as Futurism, Rationalism, Brutalism, and others characterized the twentieth century in Syracuse. The city also preserves ancient and precious works of pictorial art by important artists who lived in the city, influencing the local school; among the most notable paintings are the Burial of Saint Lucy by Caravaggio from 1608 and the Annunciation by Antonello da Messina from 1474.

=== Cuisine ===
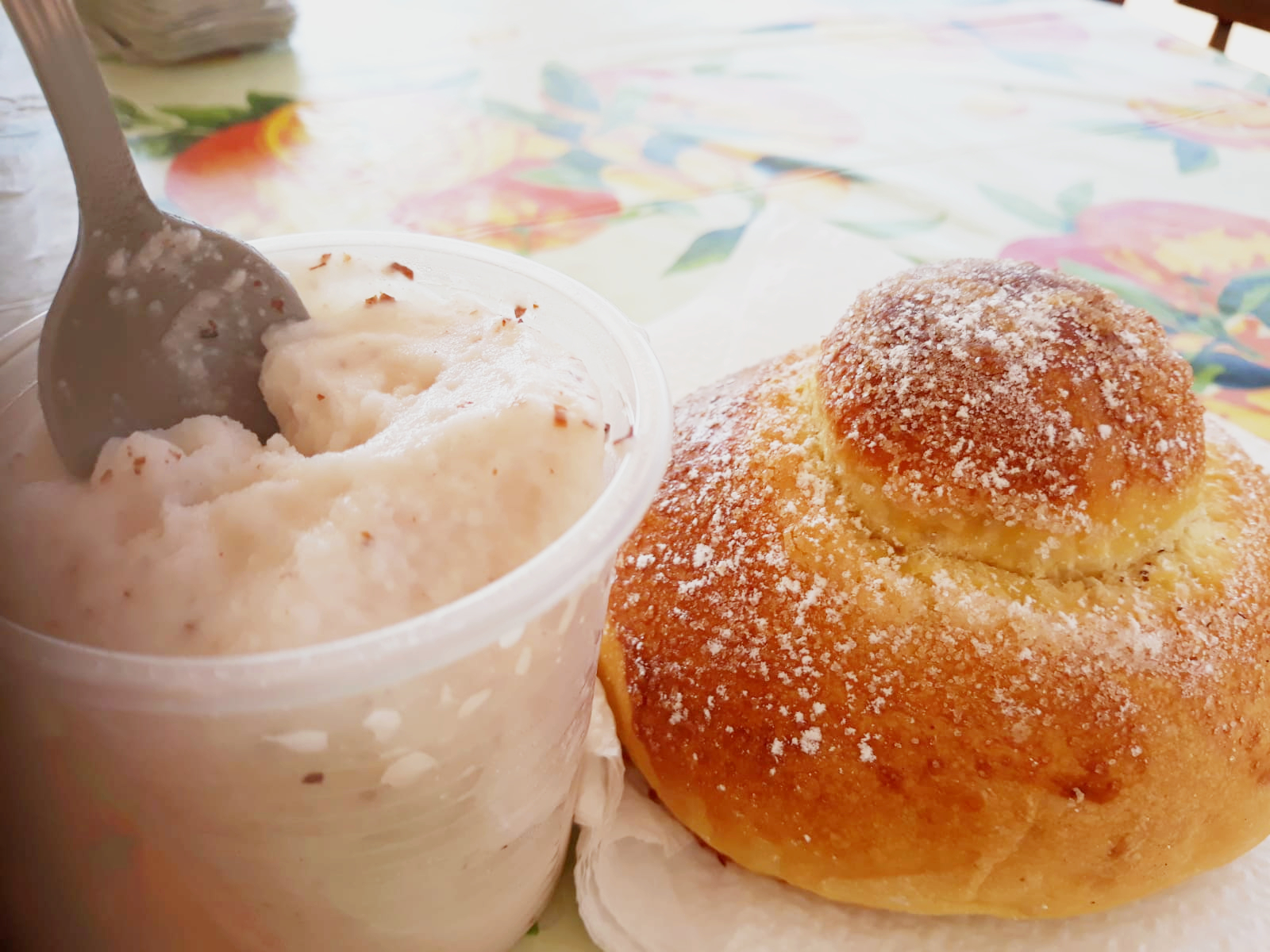
Almond granita with brioche artisanally prepared in Syracuse

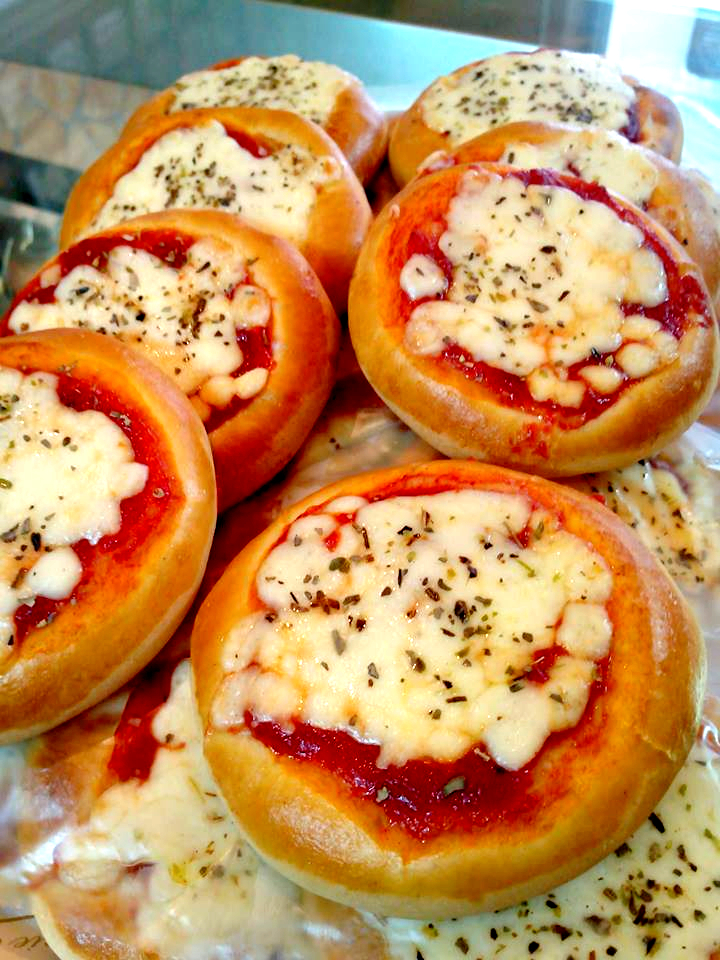
Syracusan pizzette; a classic of local baking

The earliest written records of Syracuse's cuisine date back to the Greek era. Thanks to its dominant role in the Mediterranean, the city was a pioneer in introducing Sicilian culinary habits abroad. The ancient Syracusan cuisine, due to its fame, attracted both criticism and praise: Archestratus in his treatise described it as excessively elaborate and heavy. Plato negatively judged the lavishness of Syracusan banquets and the practice of eating twice a day, which he considered a cause of debauchery. Aristophanes compared the Syracusan table to the banquets of the Sybarites (a polis known for its excessive dolce vita).

Then, my friend, if you think this is the right way, you apparently do not approve of a Syracusan table and Sicilian variety of made dishes.
Συρακοσίαν δέ, ὦ φίλε, τράπεζαν καὶ Σικελικὴν ποικιλίαν ὄψου, ὡς ἔοικας, οὐκ αἰνεῖς

— Plato, The Republic, 404d, in Francesco Rizzo, Political Dialogues and Letters.

On the other hand, Syracusan cuisine was highly appreciated by the ancient Greeks: noble families called Sicilian cooks to their tables, and the city of Syracuse gave birth to Mithaecus, who wrote the first cookbook in the Western world (5th century BC), and to Labdacus, whom Greek cooks considered their master in the culinary arts.

The most exported beverage from Syracuse was wine: "the ancient Syracusans prepared grapes – according to the precepts prescribed by Hesiod – and the way they produced Pollio wine is the same method commonly practiced today to make good muscat wines." A Greek-era legend claims that Pollio was an Argive king, the first ruler of Syracuse, who gave his name to this wine, often referred to as the oldest wine in Italy.

With the Roman domination, Syracusan wine, honey (specifically the Hyblaean honey), and wheat were exported to Rome on a large scale. Syracusan wine and oil could be found at the tables of Augustus. In subsequent centuries, Syracusan cuisine was influenced by the foreign cultures that dominated the rest of Sicily.

Today, Syracusan cuisine is part of the established Mediterranean diet, declared an Intangible Cultural Heritage of Humanity.

Among its most famous foods are olives, fish, various PAT and IGP products such as the Siracusa lemon, Sicilian red orange, Syracuse new potato, Monti Iblei olive oil, Syracuse watermelon, and the strawberry of Cassibile.

Syracusan culinary tradition includes several first and second courses, among the most typical being Syracusan fried pasta and spaghetti with tuna bottarga, Syracusan fish soup, tuna alla ghiotta, and many other dishes originating from the area. In Syracuse, they prepare impanata (a closed pizza filled with potatoes derived from the Spanish empanada), the pizzolo, and arancini with ragù (which take the classic cylindrical shape). Some of the distinctive Syracusan desserts include totò (chocolate biscuits covered with icing), giuggiulena, cuccìa, quince cheese, almond granita (the Syracusan version is mentioned in Elio Vittorini's novel The Red Carnation), the local version of Sicilian cassata, prepared with sponge cake, and almond pastries.

=== Events ===
Throughout the year, Syracuse hosts numerous events of various kinds (artistic, cultural, sporting), with national and international appeal.

- Classical performances at the Greek Theatre of Syracuse
- Euro Mediterranean Festival
- Syracuse International Ballet Festival
- Syracuse International Tango Festival
- Syracuse City Marathon
- Syracuse-Malta International Regatta
- Sea Palio
- European Music Day
- Ares International Film and Media Festival
- Ortigia Film Festival
- Pi Week (Note: The Pi Day is celebrated worldwide ("14 March is Pi Day, even on Mars the "king of numbers" is celebrated". La Stampa. 14 March 2014. Archived from the original on 18 March 2016.), and Syracuse, the homeland of the mathematical genius, has dedicated the Archimedean week at the Archimedes Technopark since 2011 (""Pi Day", Italy also celebrates Archimedes: puzzles and mathematics with exhibitions and concerts". La Repubblica. 12 March 2014. Archived from the original on 2 February 2017.))
- SudPlain Wine Fest
- Ortigia Sound
- Syracuse Pride

== Media ==
Syracuse has historically been covered editorially by major publishing groups such as La Sicilia and Giornale di Sicilia. In the past, La Sicilia offered a supplementary edition dedicated to the Syracuse municipal consortium, focusing on each municipality (South Zone, Hyblaean Zone, North Zone). Since 2020, the supplementary edition has been integrated into the daily edition. In 2021, the last physical office of print newspapers (La Sicilia, while Giornale di Sicilia closed its Syracuse office) shut down, with editorial coverage now managed through remote collaborations.

Online newspapers provide the most extensive editorial coverage in the area. Siracusa News, established in 2008, is the outlet with the highest number of journalists, followed by outlets such as Siracusa Oggi, Siracusa Post, Siracusa Press, Nuovo Sud, Web Marte, Canale 8, and Cammino.

== Economy ==
In the Syracuse area, there is the leading lemon-producing district in Italy and the European Union, with the production of Siracusa lemon, which records increasingly significant sales figures. Other significant productions in the area include Sicilian cheeses, the Syracuse new potato, which accounts for three-quarters of Sicilian production and is exported both within Italy and abroad, the Monti Iblei extra virgin olive oil, the Syracuse watermelon, and other agricultural products. In terms of wine production, Syracuse produces DOC wines, which include Nero d'Avola and Moscato di Siracusa. In Syracuse's waters, aquaculture of mollusks and crustaceans takes place, as well as fishing for a wide variety of fish, primarily serving local commerce.

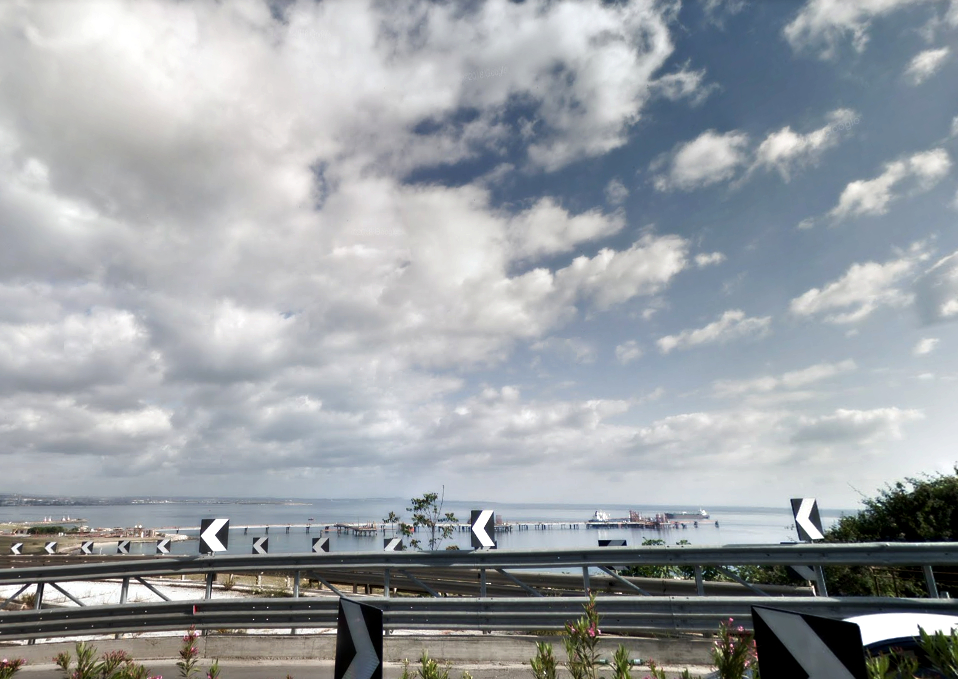
The Santa Panagia harbor, located north of Syracuse, is visible in the distance. Crude and refined oil are loaded and unloaded there.

A significant portion of the territory is dedicated to the industrial sector of petrochemicals. The Syracuse area is home to one of the largest petrochemical hubs in Europe, which, especially in the past, recorded remarkable figures for the provincial economy, though these have gradually declined.

Despite the hub registering absolutely significant export data for Italy (it is estimated that over 70% of the national total of refined petroleum products comes from the Syracuse hub alone, and these also account for 70% of the entire Sicilian export), the sector is currently considered to be in crisis.

The alternative energy sector, particularly solar energy, is under development, with various experiments in the area. There is also a globally unique lead glass recycling plant. The tertiary sector of services provides the most employment for Syracuse residents. Tourism is also growing rapidly.

== Transport ==
=== Roads ===
The municipal territory is served by the following roads:

- Strada statale 114 Orientale Sicula: connects Messina to Syracuse. Its final section has the characteristics of a main extra-urban road and serves as a link between the Autostrada Catania-Siracusa (which ends at Augusta-Villasmundo) and the Syracuse-Gela route.
- A18 Syracuse-Gela motorway, also part of the European route E45.
- Strada statale 115 Sud Occidentale Sicula: connects Trapani to Syracuse.
- Strada statale 124 Siracusana: connects the Calatino area to Syracuse, passing through the Hyblaean Mountains.

=== Railways ===
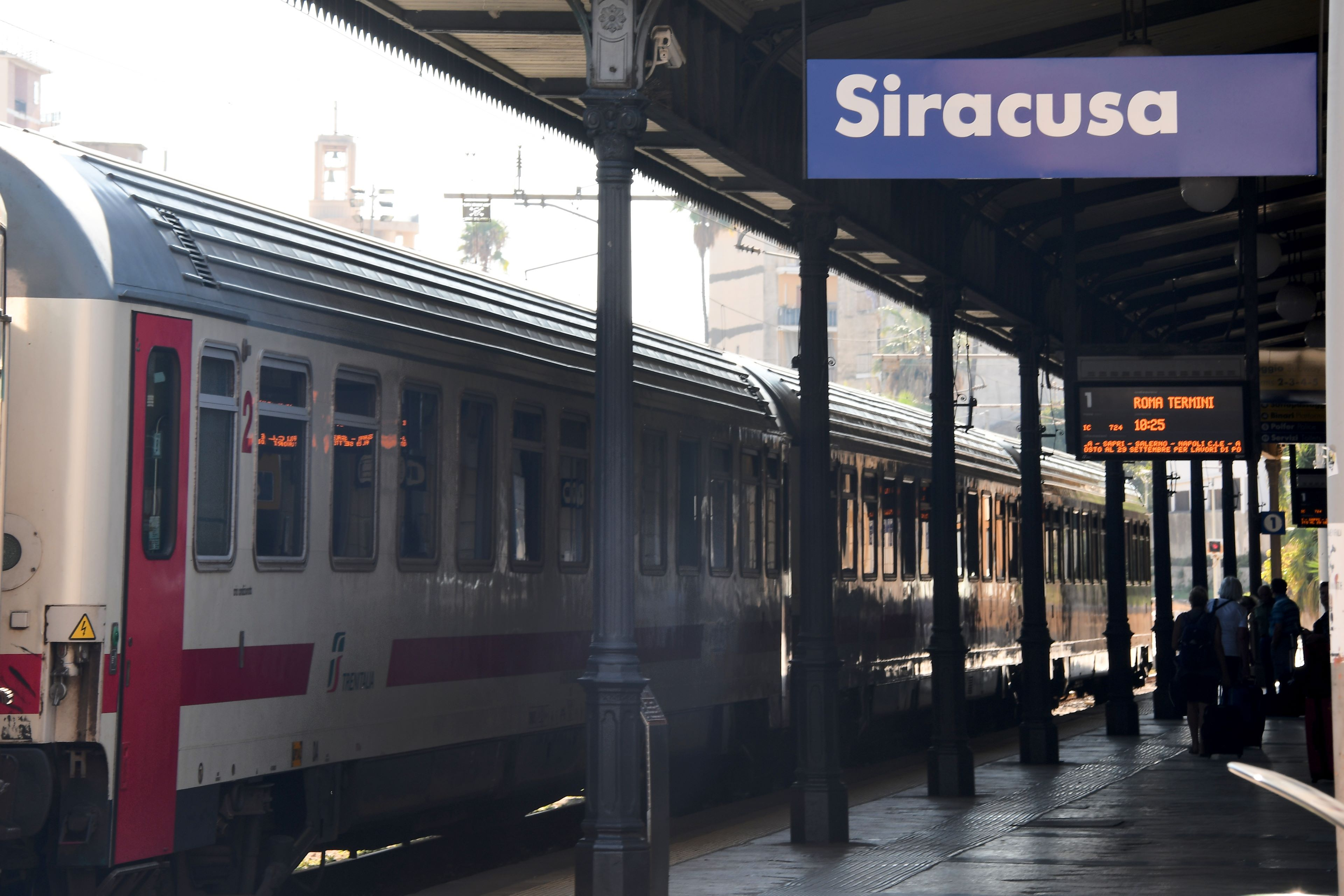
Platform 1 of Siracusa railway station

The municipality is served by the Siracusa railway station, located at km 312+176 of the Messina-Syracuse railway and the Siracusa–Gela–Canicattì railway. To the southwest is the Syracuse Locomotive Depot.

=== Ports ===
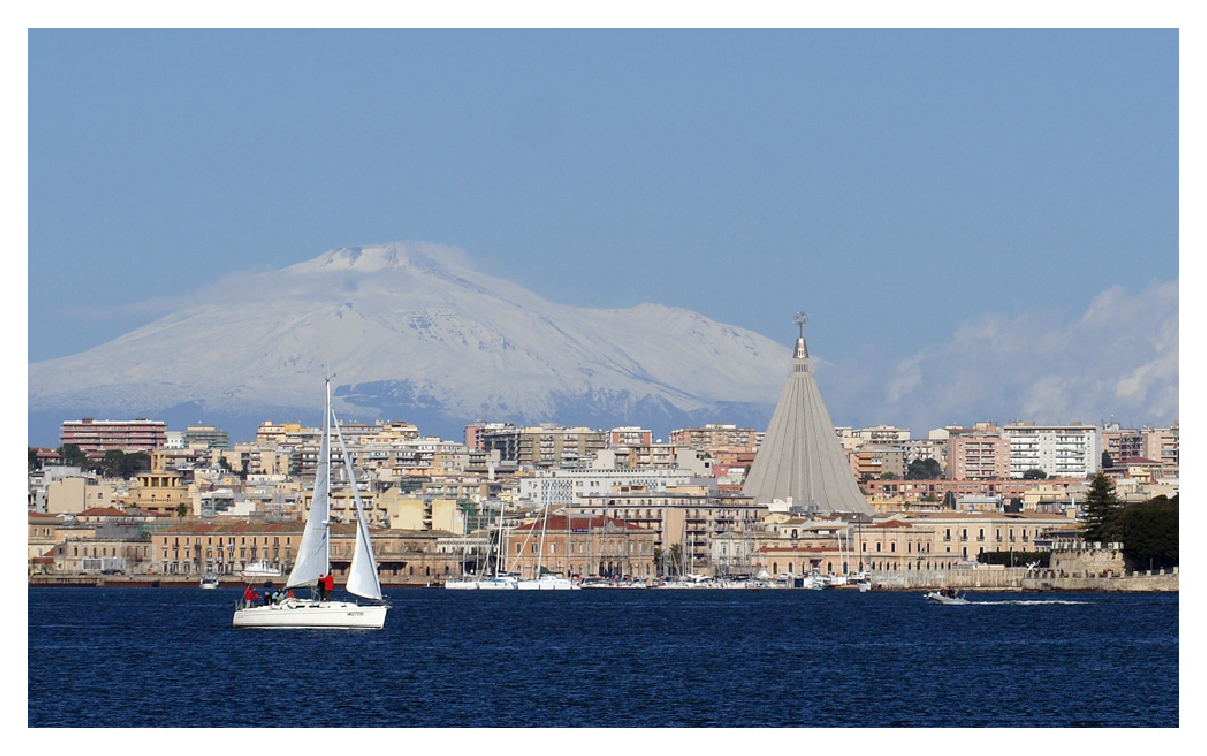
The city seen from the harbor

The city's two main ports are located in Ortygia: one to the west and one to the east of the island; respectively, the Small Port or Lakkios (the Greek Marble Port) and the Great Port, connected by a channel spanned by two bridges. Considered one of the first and oldest ports in the Mediterranean, the Syracuse port boasts a millennia-long commercial history, although today the Syracuse docks are mainly dedicated to boating (Great Port) and fishing (Small Port): approximately 300 berths in the Great Port and about 700 berths in the Small Port. The commercial function is primarily handled by the Santa Panagia roadstead, which accommodates oil tankers, chemical tankers, and gas carriers, serving Lukoil at the petrochemical complex via a long pier. Other minor ports in the municipality include: the Refuge Port (also located within the Santa Panagia bay), the small port of Ognina, and the small port of Fontane Bianche.

=== Airports ===
Syracuse has a seaplane base in the city, established in the early 19th century, which was active during the peak of the seaplane transport era and later became the headquarters of Syracuse's military commands. Between September 2007 and spring 2008, it was reactivated through a connection to the Enna Seaplane Base. Six kilometers southwest of the city is the Rinaura Airfield, equipped with aircraft capable of recreational or air sports activities.

=== Urban mobility ===
Urban and interurban transport in Syracuse is provided by regular bus services operated by the company SAIS Autolinee.

The municipality has the Rossana Maiorca cycle path, which runs through the northern side of the city: this cycle path was officially included in 2019 in the cycling route called Magna Grecia Cycle Route, which stretches from Pozzallo to Lagonegro (crossing three Italian regions).

== Sport ==
=== Sports context ===
The city of Syracuse has a significant sporting tradition (which becomes millennia-old when considering that ancient Syracuse was one of the major participants in the Panhellenic Games, often placing on the podium at Olympia, Delphi, Corinth, Nemea, and Argos). Among the most significant sporting events in contemporary Syracuse is the passage of the Olympic flame, headed to the Italian capital during the Rome Olympics, held in 1960: on 18 August of that year, the training ship Amerigo Vespucci arrived in Syracuse, coming from Greece, where it had collected the Olympic flame, stopping in the Arethusean city. There, the torch was handed to the first Italian torchbearer, the Syracuse native Concetto Lo Bello, who began the relay that would travel from Sicily to Rome. Numerous other significant sporting events have taken place in the city: at the Syracuse Circuit, Ferrari achieved its first automotive victories, participating in the Syracuse Grand Prix (whose last race was held in 1961); the Eight Nations Tournament in water polo became so linked to the city that it later took the name Syracusae Trophy; the same sport of water polo is associated with the stages of the World League; the final of the Italian Volleyball Super Cup and the Final Eight Italian Handball Cup; in 2016, it hosted the world championship of canoe polo.

=== Teams and titles ===
Below are the main teams representing the capital in their respective sports:
- Football: Serie C - Siracusa Calcio 1924;
- Football: Seconda Categoria - A.S.D. Atletico Siracusa;
- Futsal: Serie C2 - Meraco Siracusa, Holimpia Siracusa;
- Water polo: Serie A1 - CC Ortigia (men's);
- Water polo: Serie A2 - CC Ortigia (women's);
- Handball: Serie A1 - AS Albatro;
- Volleyball: Serie B - Paomar Volley Siracusa (men's);
- Basketball: Serie C - Polisportiva Aretusa;
- Canoe polo: Serie A - KST Siracusa;
- Rugby union: Serie C1 - SSD Syrako;
- Table tennis: Serie A2 - ASD Vigaro Siracusa

Below are the titles won by the individual teams of the capital in their respective sports:

- Football: AS Siracusa 1924 (1 Coppa Italia Serie C);
- Men's handball: CC Ortigia (3 Scudetti, 2 Coppe Italia);
- Women's handball: AS EOS (1 Scudetto);
- Men's water polo: CC Ortigia (2 COMEN Cups);
- Women's water polo: CC Ortigia (2 LEN Cups);
- Canoe polo: KST Siracusa (3 Scudetti, 4 Coppe Italia);
- Canoe polo: Canottieri Siracusa (1 Scudetto);
- Table tennis: Città di Siracusa (1 Scudetto)

=== Sports facilities ===
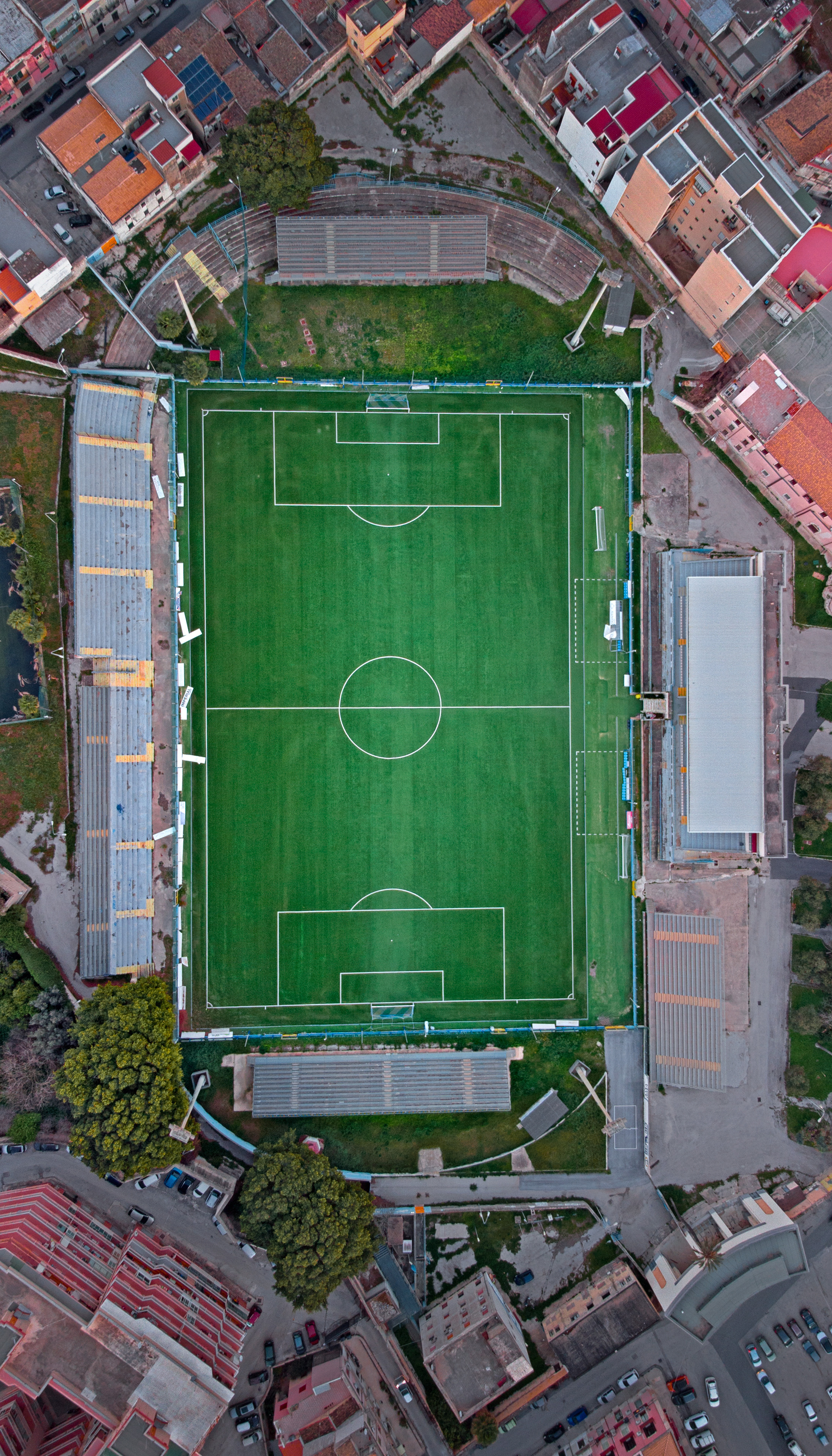
Nicola De Simone Stadium seen from above

The main sports facility in Syracuse is the multipurpose PalaLoBello center: around the main structure of the sports hall, various sports facilities for different disciplines are located. The city also has a sports field dedicated to athletics. Other sports facilities include: the ERG sports center; the Fortuna sports center; the Franco Bianchino sports field; the Pantanelli sports center; the multipurpose Giorgio Di Bari center. The Nicola De Simone Stadium is the city's main football facility.

Near Cassibile is the Mediterranean Hippodrome, where national and international horse racing events are regularly held. Finally, the aforementioned Syracuse Circuit, once used for motorsport and motorcycle racing, is no longer active.

=== Famous people ===
- Archimedes, classical Siceliot mathematician, physicist and engineer
- Antiochus of Syracuse, a Siceliot historian
- Achaeus of Syracuse, a Siceliot tragedian
- Dion, Siceliot tyrant
- Dionysius I, Siceliot tyrant
- Dionysius II, Siceliot tyrant
- Theocritus, Siceliot poet and creator of Ancient Greek pastoral poetry
- Saint Lucy, Roman martyr
- Pope Stephen III
- Ibn Hamdis, Sicilian Arab poet
- Vincenzo Mirabella (1570–1624), humanist and pioneer of archaeology
- Claudio Schifano (born 1953), contemporary artist of informal painting
- Ignazio Belluardo (born 1986), racing driver
- Salvatore Tavano (born 1980), racing driver
- Tonino Accolla (born 1949), voice actor

== International relations ==
=== Twin towns – sister cities ===
The city of Syracuse is twinned with:

- (Sweden) Stockholm, since 1970
- (Romania) Suceava, since 2007
- (Greece) Corinth, since 2007
- (Italy) Erchie, since 2009
- (France) Hauteville-la-Guichard, since 2014

Local entities have established various types of twinning with the cities of:

- (Italy) Perugia, since 2013 (through the Department for Cohesion Policies, as part of the smart city project)
- (Italy) Alessandria, since 2016 (through their respective Chamber of Commerce)
- (Italy) Castellammare di Stabia, since 2020 (through the fan bases of Siracusa and Juve Stabia, twinned since 1979)

== See also ==
- Cassibile (village)
- Greek coinage of Italy and Sicily
- Malèna – a 2000 romantic comedy-drama film starring Monica Bellucci and Giuseppe Sulfaro was mostly produced in Syracuse
- Peloponnesian League
- Sicilian Wars
- Siracusa International Institute for Criminal Justice and Human Rights
- Siracusa railway station

== Bibliography ==
- Touring Club Italiano (1989). Sicily [Sicilia].
- E. Kanceff, Interuniversity Center for Research on Travel in Italy (1998). Syracuse in the Eyes of the Traveler [Siracusa nell'occhio del viaggiatore].
- Miceli, Melinda (2009). Treasures of Syracuse [Tesori di Siracusa]. Edessae.
- Syracuse and Province [Siracusa e provincia]. Touring Club Italiano. 1999. ISBN 88-365-1253-4.
- Miceli, Melinda (2009). Syracuse, Noto, Pantalica, Akray [Siracusa, Noto, Pantalica, Akray]. Edessae.
- S. Cavallari, Francesco; Holm, Adolf (2002). Archaeological Topography of Syracuse [Topografia archeologica di Siracusa]. Città Aperta. ISBN 88-8137-055-7.
- Miceli, Melinda (2008). Syracuse and the Wonders of UNESCO [Siracusa e le meraviglie dell'UNESCO]. Edessae.
- Scorciapino, Marcello (2002). Syracuse and Province [Siracusa e provincia]. Città Aperta. ISBN 88-8137-054-9.
- Di Silvestro, Pino (2002). The Escape, the Stay. Caravaggio in Syracuse [La fuga, la sosta. Caravaggio a Siracusa]. Rizzoli. ISBN 88-17-87056-0.
- Adorno, Salvatore (2004). The Production of an Urban Space. Syracuse between the 19th and 20th Centuries [La produzione di uno spazio urbano. Siracusa tra Ottocento e Novecento]. Marsilio. ISBN 88-317-8594-X.
- Brandino, Alessandro; Brandino, Luca (2004). Syracuse in Your Pocket [Siracusa in tasca]. Flaccovio Dario. ISBN 88-7758-559-5.
- Adorno, Salvatore (2005). Syracuse 1880-2000. City, History, Plans [Siracusa 1880-2000. Città, storia, piani]. Marsilio. ISBN 88-317-8760-8.
- Correnti, Santi (2000). Unusual Guide to the Mysteries, Secrets, Legends, and Curiosities of Sicily [Guida insolita ai misteri, ai segreti, alle leggende e alle curiosità della Sicilia]. Newton Compton. ISBN 88-8289-117-8.
- Mocchetti, E., ed. (1994). "Treasures of Ortigia" [Tesori dell'Ortigia]. Supplement to Bell'Italia (August–September). Giorgio Mondadori: 104–105.
- Coarelli, F.; Torelli, M. (2000). Sicily [Sicilia]. Guide Archeologiche Laterza. pp. 209–306. ISBN 88-420-2407-4.
- Institute of Syracuse Studies, ed. (1998). Syracuse: Identity and History: 1861-1915 [Siracusa: identità e storia: 1861-1915]. A. Lombardi.
- Gargallo, Tommaso (1791). Patriotic Memories for the Restoration of Syracuse [Memorie patrie per lo ristoro di Siracusa]. Vol. 1. Stamperia Reale.
- L., Ruggiero; Scrofani, Luigi, eds. (2011). Tourism and Urban Competitiveness [Turismo e competitività urbana]. FrancoAngeli. ISBN 978-88-568-3970-8.
- Cabianca, Vincenzo (2013). Twenty Years of Urban Planning Utopia in Syracuse [Vent'anni di utopia urbanistica a Siracusa]. La Casa del Nespolo. ISBN 978-88-909062-0-6.
- Mastelloni, M.A. (2014). "Quarries and Materials Used in Some Syracuse Monuments" [Cave e materiali utilizzati in alcuni monumenti di Siracusa]. Arqueología de la Construcción IV, Ancient World Quarries: Exploitation Systems and Production Processes, Int. Conf. Padova 22-24/11/2012. Merida: 223–245.
