= Galermi Aqueduct =

- Acquedotto Galermi
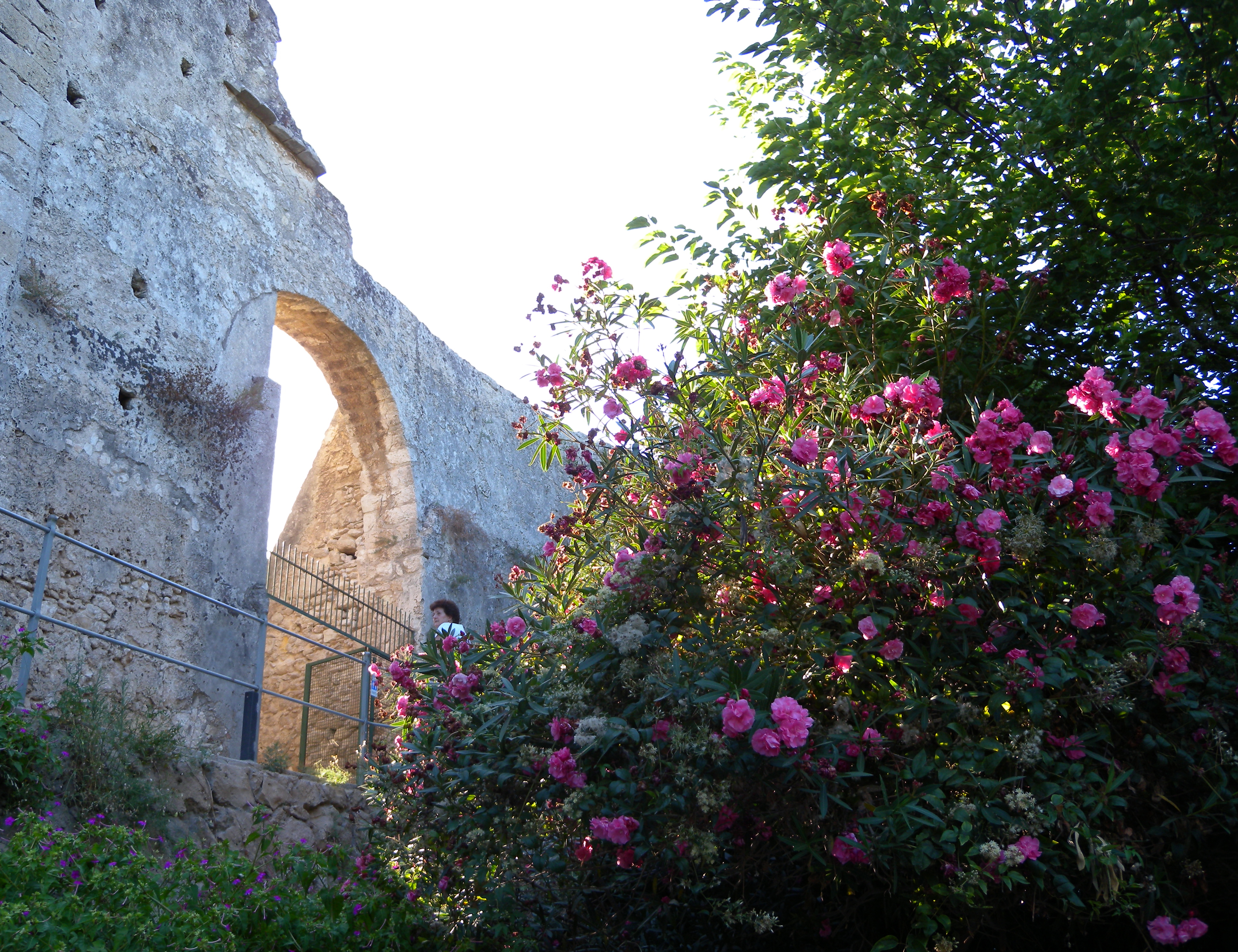
- A piece of the ancient bridge channel for the mills, connected to the Galermi aqueduct; situated within the Parco archeologico della Neapolis
- Periods: Ancient Greek Sicily
- Location: Provincia di Siracusa, Italy

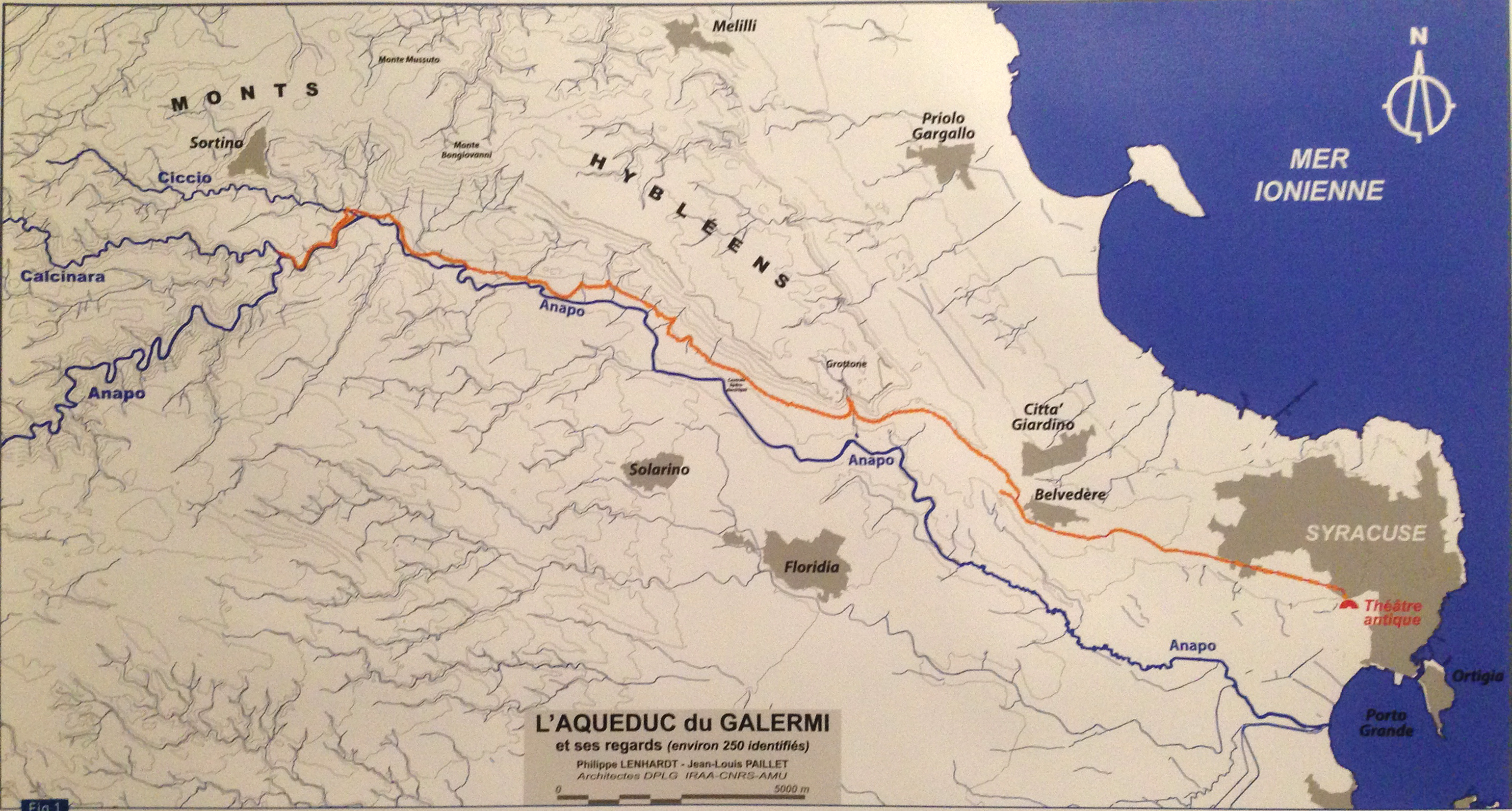
Course of the aqueduct

The Galermi Aqueduct is an ancient subterranean aqueduct; the longest and most important aqueduct of Syracuse. It gets its name from the Galermi area, a place name of uncertain origin, but perhaps from the Arabic for "Water hollow". Fazello called the aqueduct Conductus pulchrae foeminae (meaning Conduit of the modest woman)

== Description ==
Dug into the living rock, it was originally around 40 km long, bringing water directly from Monte Lauro. In later times it was shortened to a length of 29 km, drawing water from the sources of the Calcinara river, near Pantalica down to the higher parts of the city, near Neapolis. It carried around 500 litres per second. The work is considered a masterpiece of hydraulic engineering and conformed to the instructions later given by Vitruvius for the optimal slope. It is noted by him that this aqueduct, compared to other Greek aqueducts, had a great level of precision and was constructed with finesse.

In the course of construction, several inspection wells were built, with steps down carved in the rock. The wells not only allowed access but also allowed the excavated material to be removed and, once construction was completed, allowed the identification of blockages and breakages should water flow out of them.

== History ==
The aqueduct was built by Gelo in 480 BC, using the Carthaginians captured in the Battle of Himera as labour. Its construction was certainly difficult, both because of the need to maintain a constant slope and because of the problematic lay of the land, full of ravines and valleys. Quarrying was carried out with the fire technique, which softened the rock, making it crumble more easily. After it was abandoned in the Medieval period, the aqueduct became the centre of a controversy between the state and the heirs of the old lords of Sortino. The controversy had its root in the exclusive use of the water which had repeatedly prevented the Duke of Floridia from supplying himself through the "peritoi." Only in 1933 with the publication of a royal charter was it finally determined that the water and the subsoil were the exclusive property of the state. The controversy had involved all the heirs of the Marchese Specchi, as well as the families of Gaetani, Bellìa Gaetani, Gaetani di Naro, etc, and concluded with the command for all the heirs to pay an enormous sum for lost revenue and court costs. The ancient aqueduct was finally put into use for supplying the city with water and even today part of the ancient aqueduct remains in use.

Nowadays two other, secondary conduits branch out from the aqueduct, each about 1 km long, called Paradiso and Tre Miglia.

== Bibliography ==
- Mario Sequenzia & Maurizio Todini. Sortino e l'acquedotto di Siracusa. Edizioni dell'Anthurium ISBN 978-88-89552-39-1
