= Greek Theatre of Syracuse =

Ancient theater in Syracuse, Italy

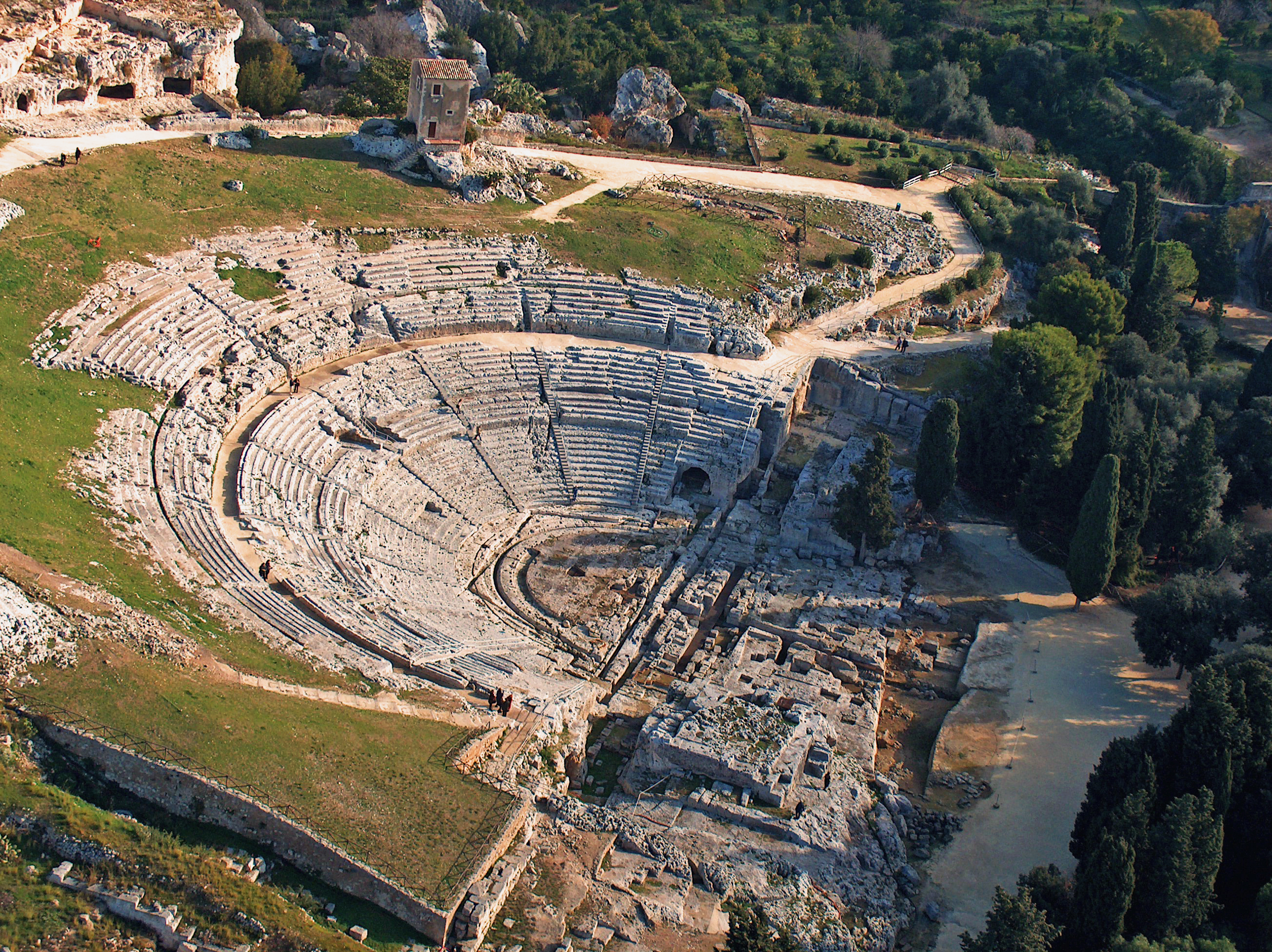
- Aerial photo of the theatre
- Interactive map of Greek Theatre of Syracuse
- 37°4′33″N 15°16′30″E
- Type: Greek theatre
- Location: Syracuse, Sicily, Italy

History
- Built: 5th century BC
- Built by: Damocopos

Site notes
- Management: Soprintendenza BB.CC.AA. di Siracusa
- Website: Area archeologica della Neapolis, Orecchio di Dionisio e Teatro Greco (in Italian)

UNESCO World Heritage Site
- Official name: Syracuse and the Rocky Necropolis of Pantalica
- Type: Cultural
- Criteria: ii, iii, iv, vi
- Designated: 2005 (25th session)
- Reference no.: 1200
- Region: Europe and North America

The Greek theatre of Syracuse lies on the south slopes of the Temenite hill, overlooking the modern city of Syracuse in southeastern Sicily, Italy. It was first built in the 5th century BC, rebuilt in the 3rd century BC and renovated again in the Roman period. Today, it is a part of the UNESCO World Heritage Site of "Syracuse and the Rocky Necropolis of Pantalica".

== Ancient theatre ==
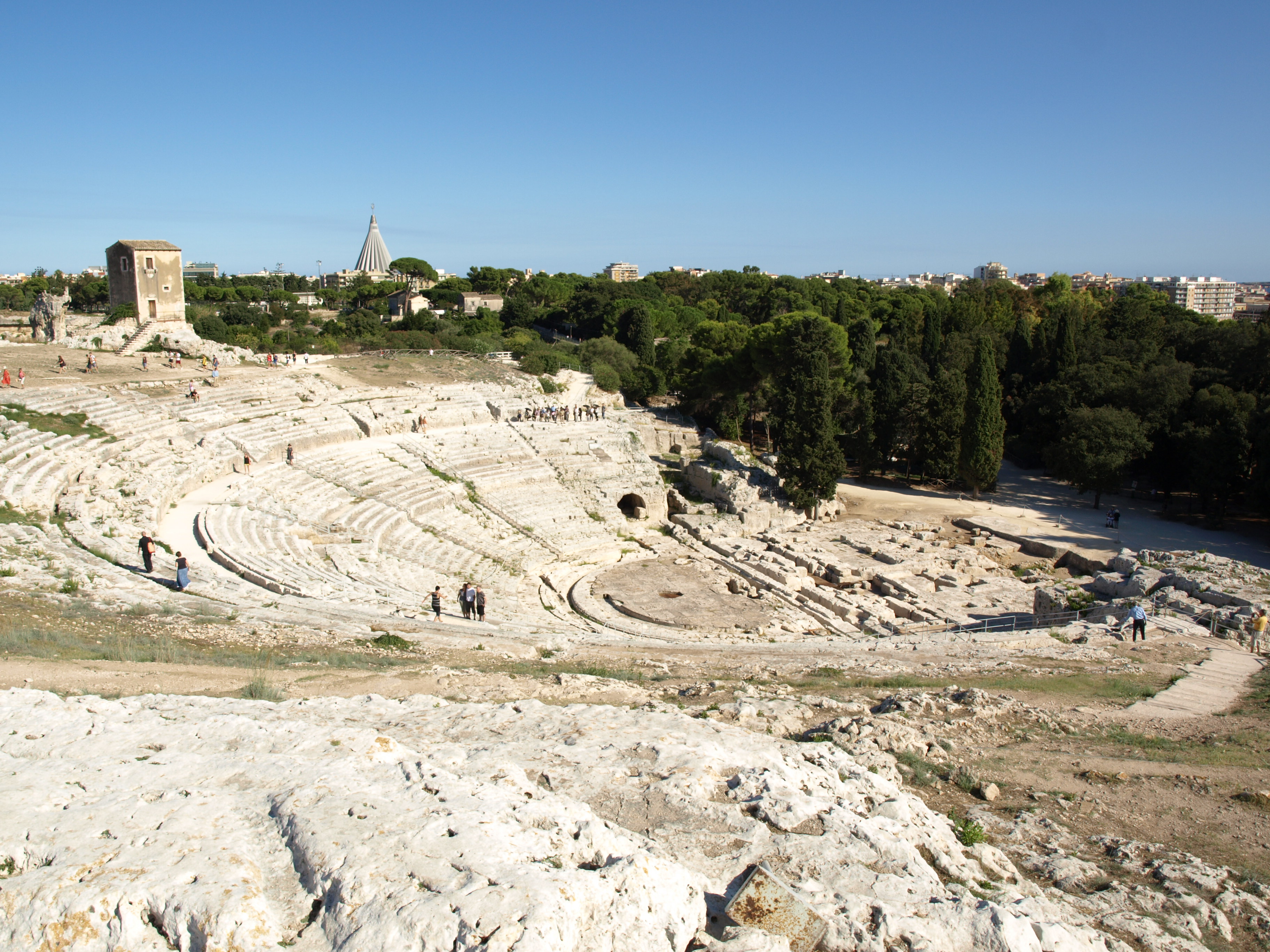
View of the theatre from the top

The existence of a theatre at Syracuse is attested by the end of the fifth century BC by the mime author, Sophron, who names the architect as Damokopos, called "Myrilla" because he made heavy use of perfume ("myrrha") at the inauguration. It has not been proven, however, that the passage records this monument and some think that it refers to another theatre in another location. However it is certain that a theatre was used in Syracuse from the early classical period and in it, it seems, the theatrical activities of the playwrights Epicharmus, Phormis and Deinolocus took place. At Syracuse, Aeschylus put on "The Aetnans" (a tragedy written to celebrate the re-foundation of Catania as Aetna by Hieron I). His The Persians, which had already been performed at Athens in 472 BC, may also have been performed at Syracuse. This latter work survives to this day, while the former has been lost. At the end of the fifth century or the beginning of the fourth, the plays of Dionysius I were probably performed here, along with those of the playwrights hosted at his court, such as Antiphon.

It has been theorised by Polacco that in this period the theatre did not yet have the semicircular form that became canonical in the course of the third century, but might instead have been made up of straight banks of seating arranged in a trapezoid. Diodorus Siculus refers to the arrival of Dionysius at Syracuse in 406 BC as the people were exiting the theatre. Plutarch recounts the escape of an angry bull during a citizen assembly in 355 BC and the arrival of Timoleon in a carriage in 336, while the people were meeting here, testifying to the importance of the building in public life.

== Hellenistic theatre ==
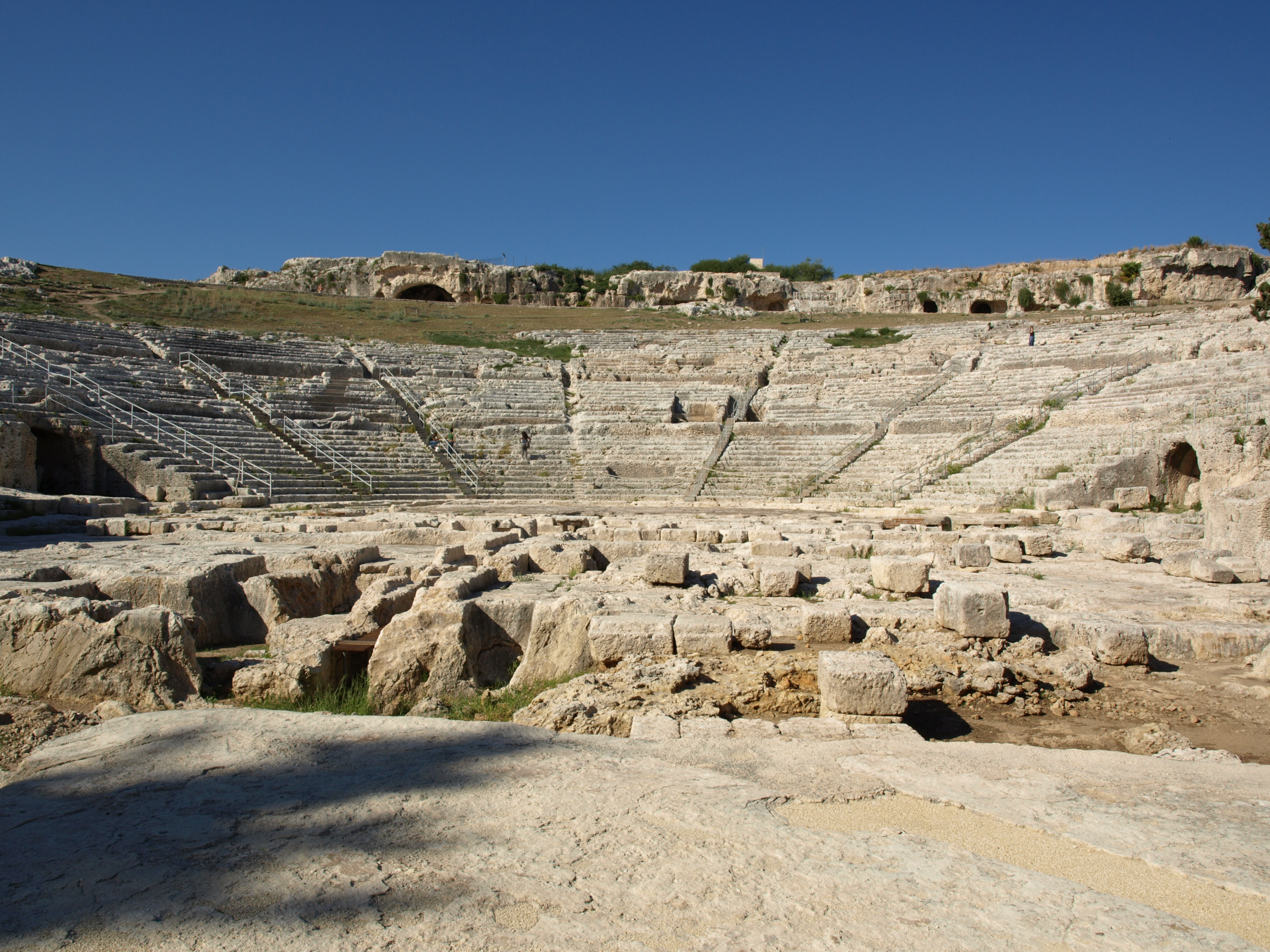
Rear view of scene building foundations and frontal view of the cavea

It seems that the theatre was renovated in the third century, after 238 BC and certainly before the death of Hieron II in 215 BC, transforming it into the form seen today. Its structure was extended, taking into account the shape of the Temenite hill and the best possibilities for acoustics. Another typical characteristic of Greek theatres is the celebration of the panoramic view, also applied to the theatre of Syracuse, offering a view of the bay of the port and the island of Ortygia.

The theatron had a diameter of 138.6 metres, one of the largest in the Greek world, and originally had 67 rows of seating, mostly cut into rock, and divided into nine sectors (cunei) by access stairs. A pathway (diazoma) runs around the theatre halfway up the cavea, dividing it in two. On the walls there are inscriptions for each of the cunei, with the names of divinities (Olympian Zeus, Herakles) and of members of the royal family (Hieron II himself, his wife Philistis, his daughter-in-law Nereis, daughter of Pyrrhus, and his son Gelo II), which has encouraged some authors to consider the inscriptions valuable for dating the monument's construction or renovation. The upper portion of the seating, now destroyed, was built up on top of an embankment held up by a retaining wall. On the central axis of the cavea, a platform was cut into the rock, perhaps a place for particularly important people to sit.

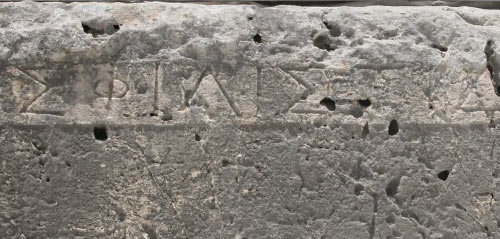
Inscriptions in the diazoma

The orchestra was originally bounded by a wide euripos (drain), with a space on the outside before the beginning of the steps, by which the public entered.

The skené is entirely destroyed and only the cuttings in the bed rock for its foundations are now visible. These belong to multiple phases and are difficult to interpret. A passage dug under the orchestra, accessible by a staircase from the stage and ending in a small room probably belongs to Hieron II's time: it is hypothetically identified with the "Stairs of Charon," which allowed the actors sudden entrances and exits. A ditch for the front curtain probably belongs to this phase too (in ancient theatres these did not fall from above, but rose from below). The traces of an element on which columns and pilasters must have stood have been interpreted as the remnants of a small mobile stage for Phlyax plays. A statue of a caryatid now preserved in the Museo archeologico regionale Paolo Orsi, which contains material excavated and recovered in the theatre, probably formed part of the theatre's decoration.

Above the theatre there is a terrace, excavated in rock, accessible by a central stairway and by a recessed path, known as "Via dei Sepolcri" (Street of the Tombs). Originally, the terrace had a large portico at the left. In the centre of the foundation wall was a grotto, the grotta del Ninfeo, excavated in the rock, bordered by niches probably designed to host statues and originally probably surrounded by architectural elements of the Doric order (of which only parts of a frieze survives). Inside the room (9.35 x 6.35 m, 4.75 m high) was a tub made of Opus signinum, into which water from the ancient Greek aqueduct flowed. From here the water flowed into the hydraulic system of the theatre. The whole thing might be identified with the Mouseion or sanctuary of Muses, seat of the company of actors. According to the anonymous Life of Euripides, Dionysios dedicated objects belonging to the tragic poet Euripides acquired at great expense in Greece in this sanctuary.

== Roman period theatre ==
Important modifications were made to the theatre, perhaps at the time when the colonia was founded in the early Augustan period. The cavea was modified to a semicircular form, typical of Roman theatres, rather than the horseshoe used in Greek theatres and corridors allowing access past the scene building (parodoi). The scene building itself was reconstructed in monumental form with rectangular niches at centre and two niches with a semicircular plan on the sides, containing doors to the scene. A new ditch was dug for the curtain, with a control room. In the orchestra, the old euripos was buried, replaced by a new canal, much tighter and closer to the stairs of the cavea, expanding its diameter from 16 m to 21.4 m. The decoration of the scene probably underwent renovations in the Flavian and/or Antonine periods.

In the late Imperial period other modifications were conducted, designed to adapt the orchestra for water games and the scene was probably moved back. Traces of adaptations to allow the theatre to host gladiatorial battles and spectacles with beasts by the elimination of the first steps of the cavea to create a raised wall protecting the spectators do not exist. Instead, these spectacles probably continued to take place in the amphitheatre found in Syracuse since the Augustan period.

An inscription which is now lost mentioned a Neratius Palmatus as the one responsible for a renovation of the scene: if this was the same person who restored the Curia at Rome after the Sack of Rome by Alaric in 410, then the final works on the theatre at Syracuse can be dated to the beginning of the fifth century AD, by which time the building was nearly nine hundred years old.

== Subsequent history ==
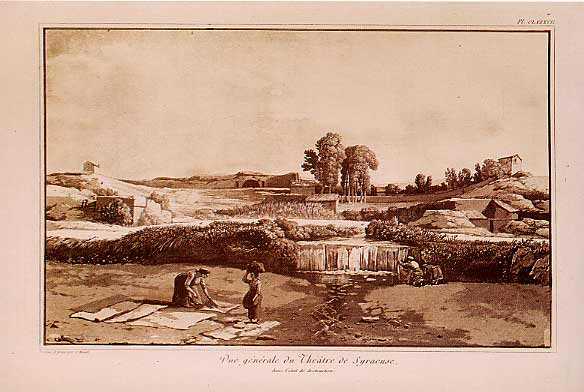
Greek theatre of Syracuse, Houel

Remaining abandoned for centuries, it underwent progressive spoliation at the hands of the Spanish under Charles V, who used the stone blocks to construct new fortifications on Ortygia. This process led to the destruction of the scene building and the upper part of the seating. After the second half of the sixteenth century, the Marchess of Sortino, Pietro Gaetani, reactivated the ancient aqueduct which brought water to the top of the theatre, allowing the creation of several water mills in the cavea, of which the so-called casetta dei mugnai (Millers' Cottage) at the top of the cavea remains visible.

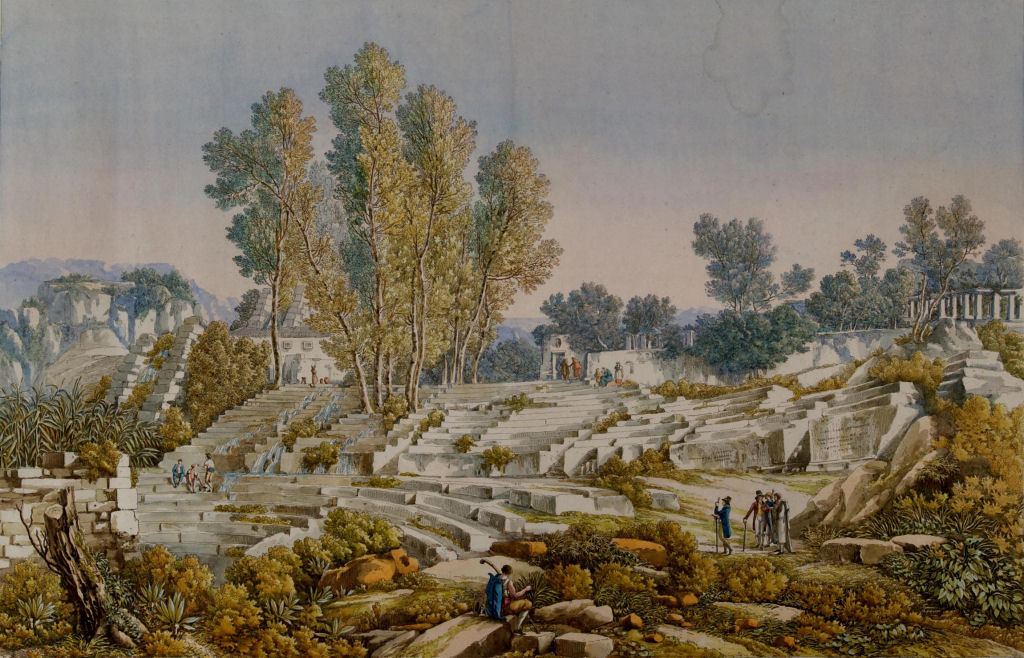
Théatre de Syracuse, end of the eighteenth century

At the end of the eighteenth century, interest in the theatre revived and it was mentioned and depicted by the erudites of the period (Arezzo, Fazello, Mirabella, Bonanni) and by famous travellers (d'Orville, Joseph Hermann von Riedesel, (Note: "Although the stage has been destroyed, the grandness, prominence and majesty with which it was cut into the rock, demands respect and awe") Jean-Claude Richard, Houel, Denon, (Note: "...the theatre with its seating would have been prefectly preserved, if it had not been used by some as a quarry for stone and if they did not, even today, rip it apart without restraint") etc.). In the following century proper excavations took place, thanks to the interest of Landolina and Cavallari who busied themselves with freeing the monument from the dirt which had built up on top of it. Subsequently, archaeological investigation was carried out by Paolo Orsi and other archaeologists, ending with Voza in 1988.

In 1914, the Istituto Nazionale del Dramma Antico (INDA) began the annual performance of Greek drama in the ancient theatre (the first was the tragedy Agamemnon of Aeschylus, directed by Ettore Romagnoli). The ancient Greek tragedies are performed at sunset, in Italian (with translations by famous writers such as Salvatore Quasimodo), without sound systems because of the quality of the theatre's acoustics. Each theatre season begins in May and ends in July, attracting thousands of spectators from all over the world. Some of the most illustrious performed tragedies are Antigone, Oedipus Rex, Electra, Medea and The Bacchae. Aside from this, the theatre has enjoyed use for concerts and official prizegivings, like the Premio Vittorini, but such use has been tightly limited for conservation reasons.

Since 2010 the theatre has been one of the monuments of the Servizio Parco Archeologico di Siracusa and of the archaeological area of the surrounding comuni, an organ of the Regione Siciliana, Assessorato Regionale dei Beni Culturali e dell'Identità Siciliana. In 2014, the Assessorato authorised the use of the theatre for summer events like music, singing and dance performances.

== See also ==
- List of ancient Greek theatres
- List of Roman theatres
- Ancient theatre of Taormina

== Footnotes ==
Notes

== Bibliography ==
- B. Pace, Arte e cività della Sicilia antica, Roma 1938
- F.S. Cavallari, Relazione sullo stato delle antichità di Sicilia, sulle scoperte e sui restauri dal 1860 al 1872, Roma 1958
- C. Anti, Guida per il visitatore del teatro antico di Siracusa, Firenze, 1948.
- C. Anti, Il teatro greco trapezoidale ad ali convergenti, in Dioniso, Bollettino Ist. Naz. Dramma antico, 1948, pp. 152–162
- P.E. Arias, il teatro greco fuori di Atene, Firenze, 1934, pp. 139–142
- L.Bernabò Brea, Studi sul teatro greco di Siracusa, Palladio, XVII, 1967, pp. 97–154
- Kathryn G. Bosher. 2021. Greek Theater in Ancient Sicily. Cambridge University Press.
- de Lisle, Christopher (2022). "The Autocratic Theatre of Hieron". In Csapo, Eric; Goette, Hans Rupprecht; Green, J. Richard; Le Guen, Brigitte; Paillard, Elodie; Stoop, Jelle; Wilson, Peter (eds.). Theatre and Autocracy in the Ancient World. Walter de Gruyter GmbH & Co KG. pp. 55–69. ISBN 978-3-11-098038-7.
- G.V. Gentili, Siracusa, in EAA, Roma 1966, pp. 329–330, 333-334
- G. Traversari, Tetimino e Colimbétra, ultime manifestazioni del teatro antico, in Dioniso, Bollettino Ist. Naz. Dramma antico, 1950, pp. 21–22
- L.Polacco, C. Anti, Il teatro antico di Siracusa, [pars 1] con la collaborazione di M.Trojani; rilievi di I. Gismondi e A.C. Scolari, Rimini 1981
- L. Polacco (a cura di), Il teatro antico di Siracusa pars altera, con scritti di L. Polacco, S.L. Agnello, G. Lena, G. Marchese, Padova, 1990
- L. Polacco, la posizione del teatro greco di siracusa nel quadro dell’architettura teatrale antica in Sicilia, in APARCHAI, studi sulla Magna Grecia e la Sicilia antica in onore di PE Arias, Pisa 1982, pp. 431–443
- D. Mertens, Recensione a Polacco Anti 1981, Gnomon. 91, 1984, pp. 263 s.
- K. Mitens, Teatri greci e teatri ispirati all’architettura greca in Sicilia e nell’Italia Meridionale, Roma 1988, pp. 116–120
- L. Polacco, M. Trojani, A.C. Scolari, Ricerche e scavi nell'area del teatro antico di Siracusa, "Kokalos", XXX-XXXI, 1984–85, ii,2, pp. 839–846, tavv. CLXXXVI-CLXXXIX
- H.P. Isler, Siracusa in Teatri greci e romani, alle origini del linguaggio rappresentato- censimento analitico, Roma 1994, V, III
- D. Mertens, Città e monumenti dei Greci d’Occidente: dalla colonizzazione alla fine del V sec. a.C., Roma, 2006, p. 313. ISBN 8882653676
- U. Pappalardo, Daniela Borrelli, Teatri greci e romani, Verona, 2007, pp. 46–49. ISBN 8877433264
- M.A. Mastelloni, “Syracuse. The “via sacra” and the Ancient Theater of Neapolis” description and demands. In “Architettura e archeologie dei paesaggi della produzione” Erasmus Intensive Programme - “Archaeology’s places and contemporary uses” in “Archaeology’s places and contemporary uses” design Workshop 3, pp. 172-177
- M.A. Mastelloni, Cave e materiali utilizzati in alcuni monumenti di Siracusa, in Arquelogía de la Construcción IV, Le cave nel mondo antico: sistemi di sfruttamento e processi produttivi, Conv Int. Padova 22-24/11/2012, Merida 2014, pp. 223-245
