= Capuchin Friary, Sortino =

Capuchin friary in Sortino, Italy

Coordinates: 37.1551°N 15.0275°E

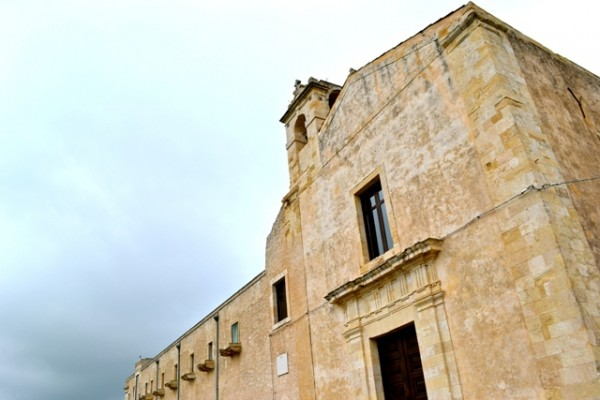
Capuchin Friary of Sortino

The Capuchin Friary, with its adjoining church, is a religious complex located in Sortino, in the province of Syracuse, Italy.

== History ==
The friary was founded in 1556. Almost totally destroyed by the earthquake of 1693, it was rebuilt, enlarged and completed in 1748, thanks to the contributions of the faithful and the noble family of Caetani, Princes of Cassaro and Marquesses of Sortino. Starting in 1764, the friary became the host of a novitiate. With the suppression of religious orders (1866), the monastery, church, and associated farm and forest lands, became the property of the state. The complex was repurchased by the friars in 1879, thanks to the work of the Capuchin from Sortinese father Eugenio Scamporlino (Provincial Minister of the time) and was home to the only novitiate of Sicily, also hosting novices from Naples, Bari and Malta. Among the novices, here lived and died the servant of God brother Giuseppe Maria of Palermo, of whom the process of beatification and canonization is currently underway. The friary in the 60s was home to the interprovincial theological school and in the 90s, to the interprovincial post-novitiate.

== Description ==
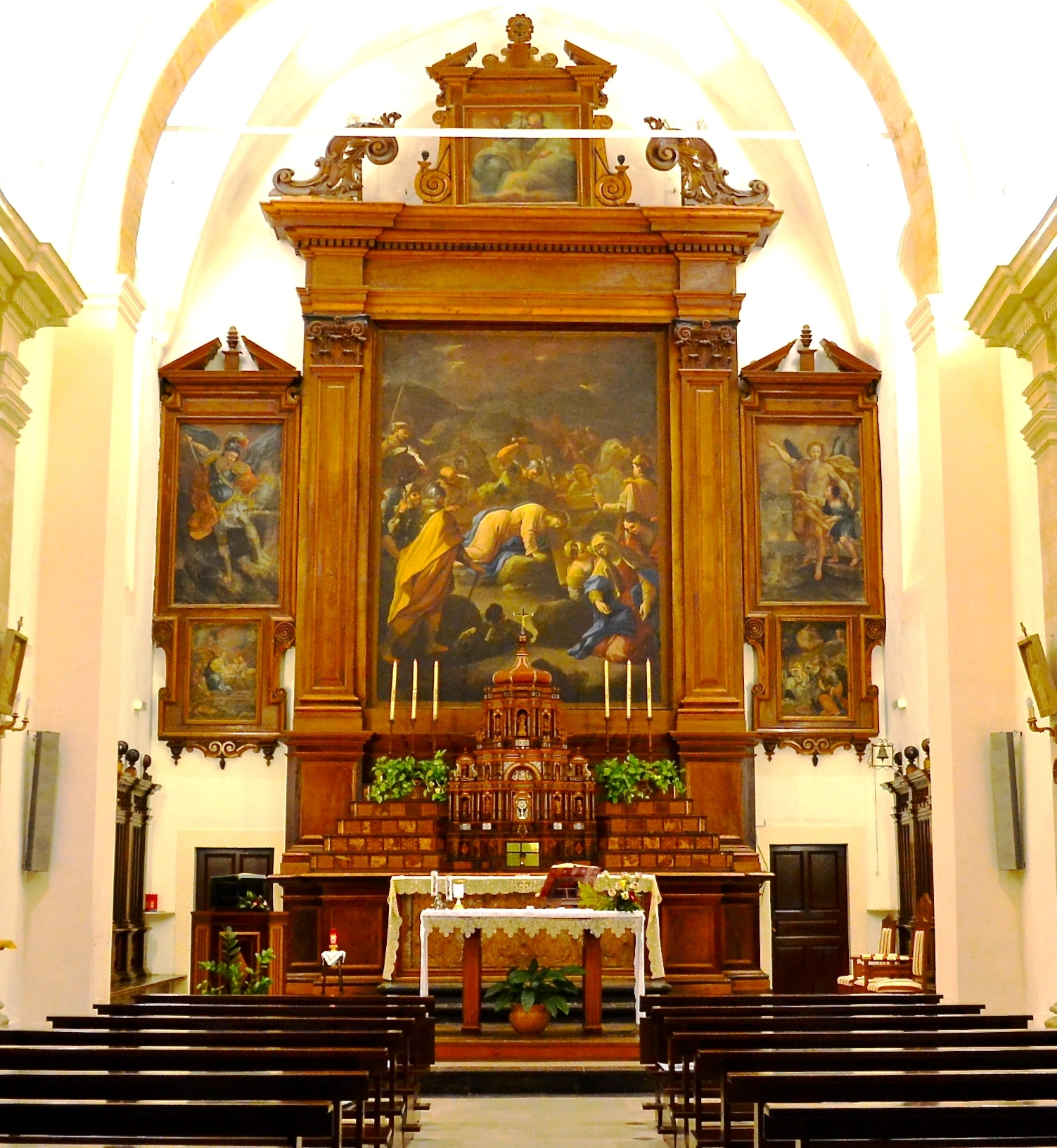
Capuchins church of Sortino

With a sober and inconspicuous architecture, according to the canons of franciscan simplicity, the friary is articulated around a large cloister. The church, with a single nave, with two side chapels, dedicated to the Virgin Sorrowful, inside preserves a work of significant value: the wooden tabernacle made by the Capuchin Angelo Gagliano of Mazzarino (1743-1809). It took 18 years of work, and consists of singular panels, made of apricot wood, rose, prickly pear and ivory and mother-of-pearl details. At the bottom a precious frontal, in hammered leather, adorns its altar.

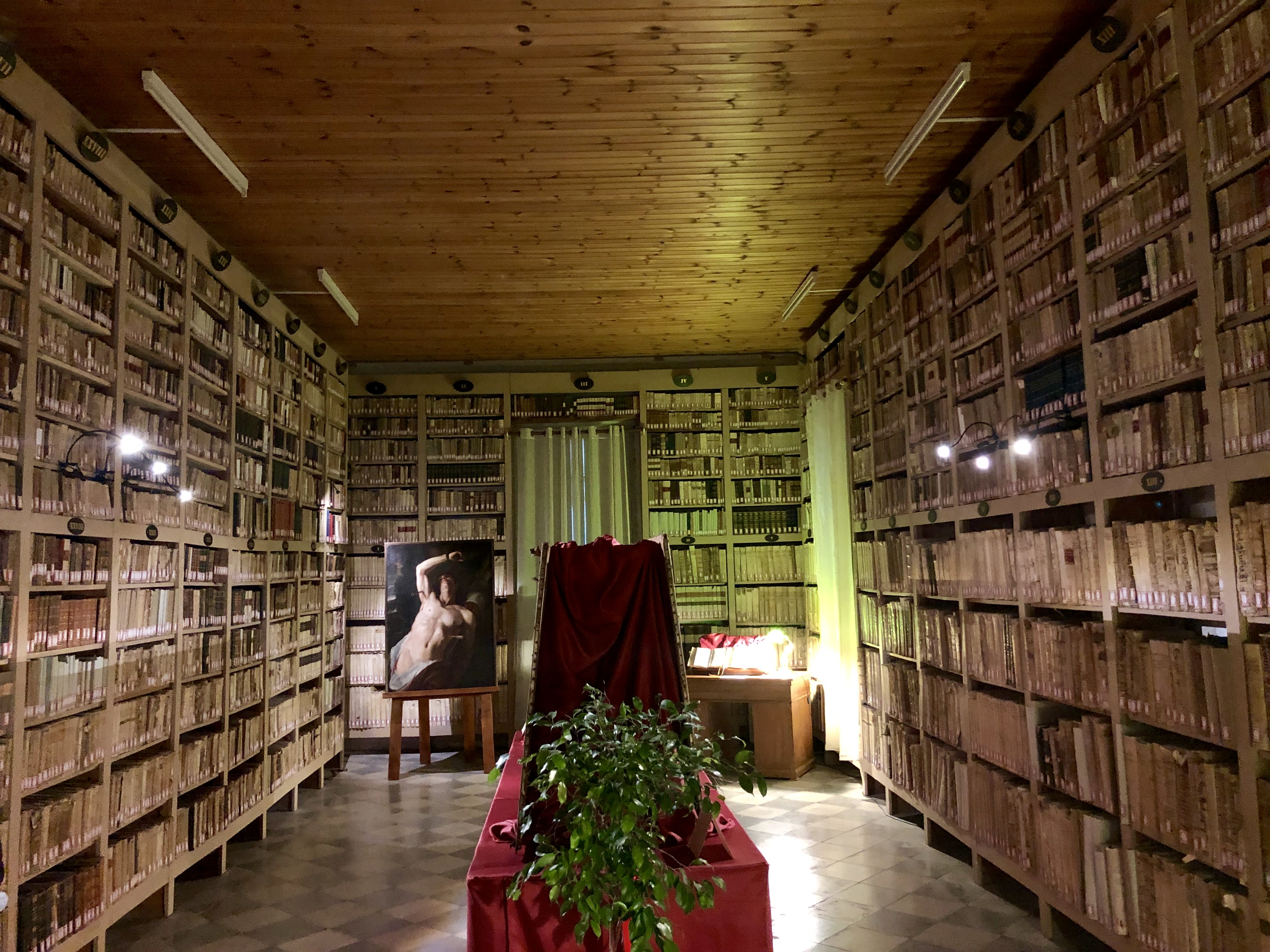
Capuchins Library

The altarpiece, dating back to the 18th century, by an unknown artist, represents Jesus under the cross and his encounter with the Mother. On the sides are the paintings of the Archangels Michael and Raphael, below which there are two other, smaller canvases, depicting the Nativity of Jesus and the Nativity of John the Baptist (by unknown artist, dating back to the 18th century). All in a wooden setting, it was the work of cabinetmaker friars of the 18th century. Among the works of art, which are preserved in the friary of Sortino, deserving of mention: the marble statue of St. Anthony of Padua, in Gaginesco style, dating back to 1527 and a canvas depicting the Martyrdom of St. Sebastian (17th Century), of the Caravaggesca school. The friary also has a precious library with 14,630 volumes. Among the volumes of the ancient floor are: 20 precious manuscripts, some incunabula, 196 books from the 16th-century and thousands of texts from the seventeenth, eighteenth and nineteenth hundreds
