= Giuseppe Maria of Palermo =

Italian friar

Servant of God Giuseppe Maria of Palermo OFMCap
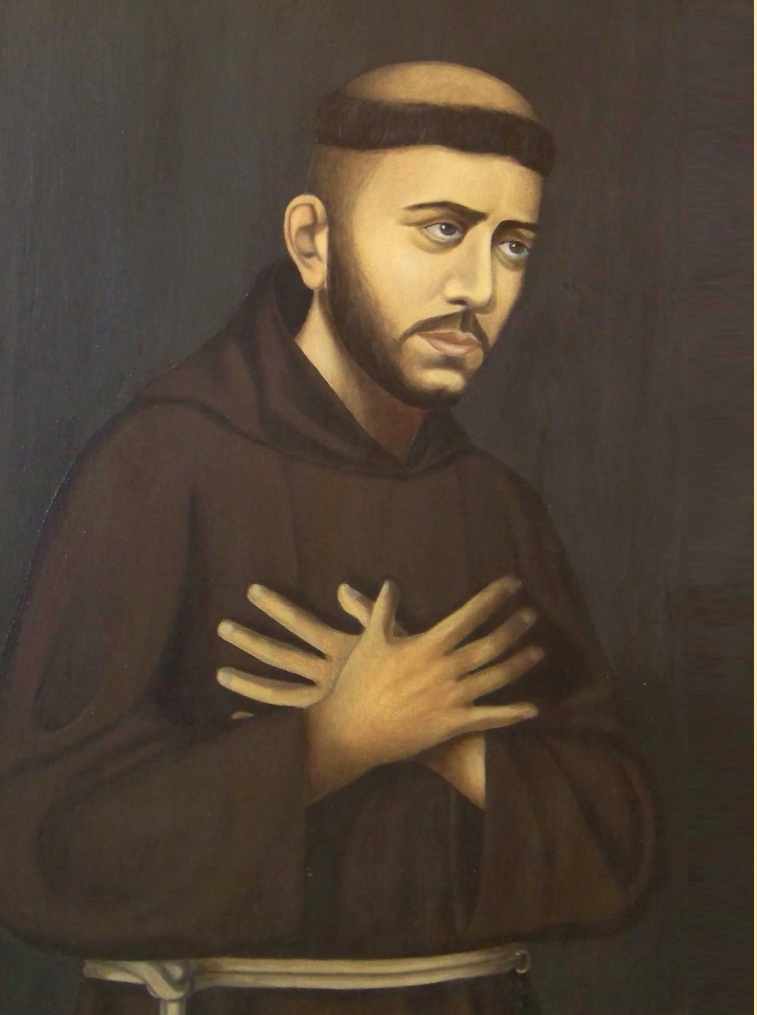
- Born: 1 February 1864; Palermo, Kingdom of Italy
- Died: 1 January 1886 (aged 21); Sortino, Kingdom of Italy
- Resting place: Capuchin Friary, Sortino

Giuseppe Maria of Palermo, OFMCap, born Vincenzo Diliberto (Palermo, 1 February 1864 – Sortino, 1 January 1886), was an Italian Capuchin friar, whose process of beatification has been opened, thus giving him the title of a Servant of God.

== Biography ==
He was born in Palermo on February 1, 1864 to Nicolò, an engineer of civil engineering, and Rosa, a housewife. He received First Communion in 1871, at the age of seven, in the church of Saint Francis of Assisi. The premature death of his mother, when Vincent was only eleven years old, helped to accentuate his restless character. His father appealed in vain to some prestigious colleges in the city by one of which, the Randazzo Institute, was definitively expelled for misconduct, labelled as a rebellious and incorrigible. At the age of fifteen, after a slow inner work, thanks to the friendship and spiritual direction experienced in the San Rocco college, Vincenzo began a gradual walk of "conversion". Apathy and mischief were replaced by the practices of piety, that culminated in the frequency of the sacraments and, in a particular way, in the adoration of the Blessed Sacrament, becoming a model for the others. He soon felt the desire to embrace priestly life, therefore, having obtained paternal approval, on June 5, 1881 he entered the Archbishop's Seminary of Palermo, preceded by the fame of “Converted”. During the four years of stay in the Seminary, Vincenzo increased his love for the Eucharist to the point of contriving, through a game of mirrors, a way to see the tabernacle from the hall of physics and so to pray day and night, escaping curious looks. On August 31, 1884, the twenty-year-old seminarian retired, on the advice of his confessor and spiritual director, for two months in the solitude of the Franciscan convent of Baida, then uninhabited, in view of the choice of a religious order to live his spiritual life in. On his return from Baida, the meeting with a young Capuchin friar, returning from the year of novitiate in the friary of Sortino, put an end to his doubts, choosing the Order of Friars Minor Capuchin. After his father's initial resistance, obtained his permission, Vincenzo, in January 1885, left with his brother Sylvester for Sortino. Welcomed by the Provincial Minister Father Eugenio Scamporlino, on February 14, 1885 he received the dress of the Capuchin novice and the new name: "brother Giuseppe Maria of Palermo", thus beginning the year of trial. In a letter to his father, brother Giuseppe did not hide his "greatest joy" in wearing the dress of poverty and in practicing all the observances that were required in a Capuchin novitiate. The austere standard of living soon collided with the health of the young man who, as early as November 1885, blamed the unequivocal symptoms of pneumonia that would lead to his death in a short time. Brother Giuseppe Maria of Palermo died in Sortino, in the novitiate convent of the Capuchins, at 0:30 am on January 1, 1886.

== After death ==
The news of the death, in fame of holiness, of the young Capuchin novice from Palermo spread rapidly and, many flocked, first to the convent and then to the church, to show his devotion. The body of Fra Giuseppe Maria remained exposed for three days. On Sunday, January 3, 1886 the venerated body was accompanied by friars, clergy and crowds to the city cemetery and on Monday, January 4, they proceeded with the burial in the capuchin tomb. Only from October 21, 1928, the mortal remains of the novice in fame of holiness rest in the church of the Capuchin friary in Sortino, with the authorization of the competent Roman Congregation of Rites.

== Beatification process ==
Given the persistence of the fama sanctitatis of the young novice brother Giuseppe Maria of Palermo, between 1890 and 1908 the information process that ended in 1913 took place between Palermo and Syracuse (diocese of the birth and death of the servant of God). On May 13, 1914, Pope Pius X gave the approval for the introduction of the cause by the Apostolic Process, which took place between 1914 and 1924. After a long period of stasis, in 2001, the Congregation for the Causes of Saints appointed the rapporteur for the drafting of the Positio super virtutibus. On March 3, 2013, by the Archdiocese of Syracuse, a supplementary inquiry into the continuity of the reputation of holiness of the servant of God was launched at the request of the Congregation for the Causes of Saints, ending with the meeting and the final report of the Diocesan Tribunal, in the presence of the Archbishop Salvatore Pappalardo, on May 10, 2016. On February 17, 2017, the Congregation for the Causes of Saints issued the Decree of Legal Validity of the Inquiry. The current rapporteur of the Cause is the capuchin Br. Vincenzo Criscuolo.
