= Michele Tedeschi Rizzone =

Italian politician, patriot and military officer (1840–1898)

Senator of the Kingdom of Italy
- In office 13 December 1890 – 14 July 1898

Member of the Chamber of Deputies
- In office 5 December 1870 – 25 September 1882

President of the Province of Syracuse
- In office 1889–1890
- Succeeded by: Alessandro Specchi
- In office 1893–1894
- Preceded by: Antonio Bruno Modica
- Succeeded by: Sebastiano Italia

President of the Provincial Council of Syracuse
- In office 1876–1877
- Preceded by: Antonio Faila
- Succeeded by: Pietro Landolina Trigona

Personal details
- Born: 18 October 1840 Modica, Kingdom of the Two Sicilies
- Died: 14 July 1898 (aged 57) Pozzallo, Kingdom of Italy
- Party: Historical Left
- Profession: Landowner, military officer

Michele Tedeschi Rizzone, Marquis of Scaro (18 October 1840 – 14 July 1898) was an Italian politician, patriot and military officer. He served as mayor of Modica in 1868 and 1892, as a member of the Chamber of Deputies from 1870 to 1882, and as a senator of the Kingdom of Italy from 1890 until his death in 1898. A member of the Historical Left, he also served as president of the Provincial Council of Syracuse and as president of the province.
