= Roman Catholic Diocese of Lentini =

The Diocese of Lentini (Latin: Dioecesis Leontina) was a Roman Catholic diocese located in the town of Lentini in the Province of Syracuse in the southeast of Sicily. Erected in 259, it was suppressed in 790. It was restored as a Titular Episcopal See in 1968.

== See also ==
- Catholic Church in Italy
