= Grotta del Ninfeo =

Archaeological site in Syracuse, Italy

Coordinates: 37.059604°N 15.293694°E

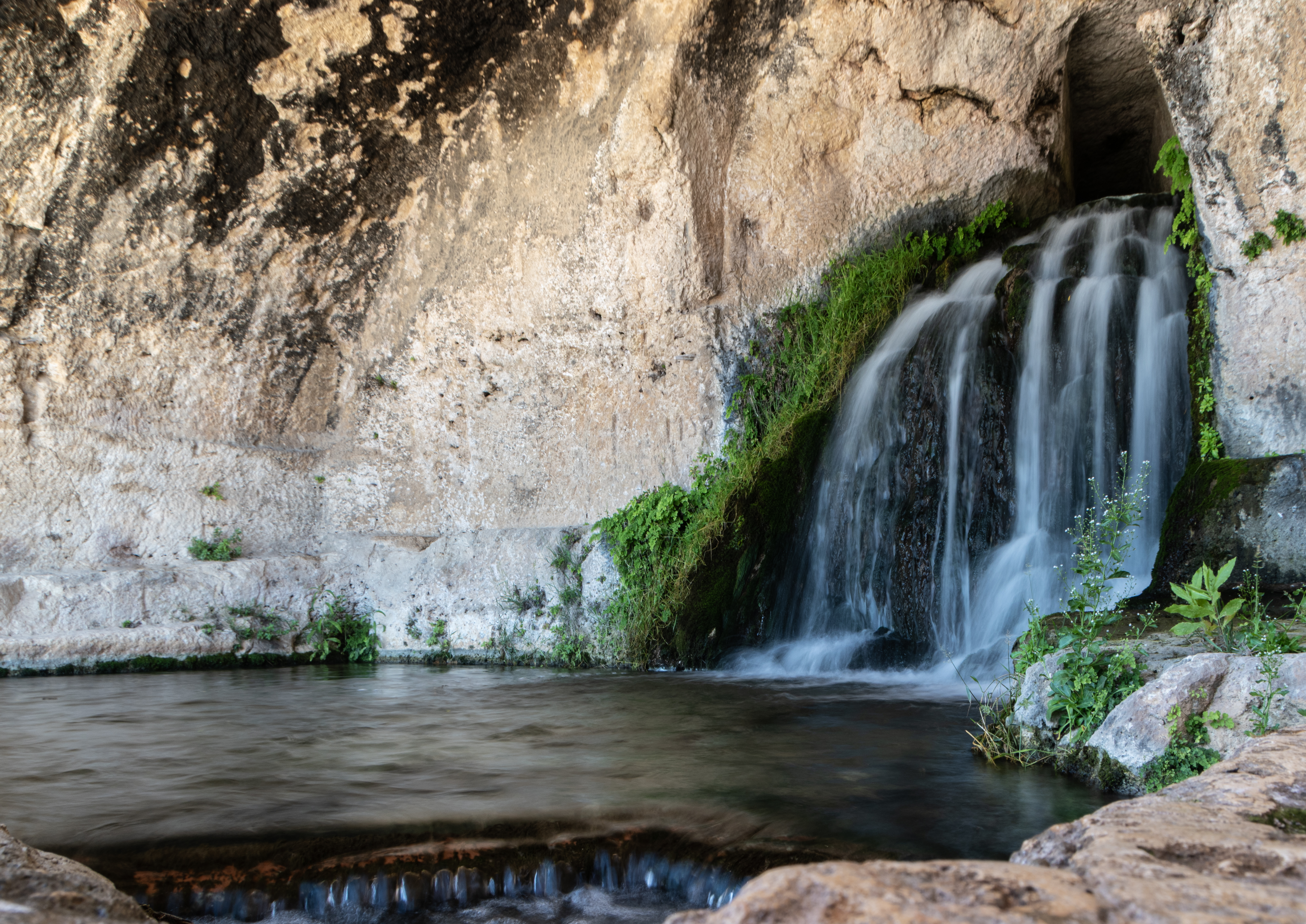
- La Grotta del Ninfeo
- Interactive map of Grotta del Ninfeo
- Type: Nymphaeum, Mouseion
- Periods: Hellenistic & Roman
- Cultures: Ancient Sicily
- Satellite of: Ancient Syracuse
- Location: Siracusa, Italy
- Region: Sicily
- Part of: Greek Theatre of Syracuse

Site notes
- Management: Comune of Siracusa

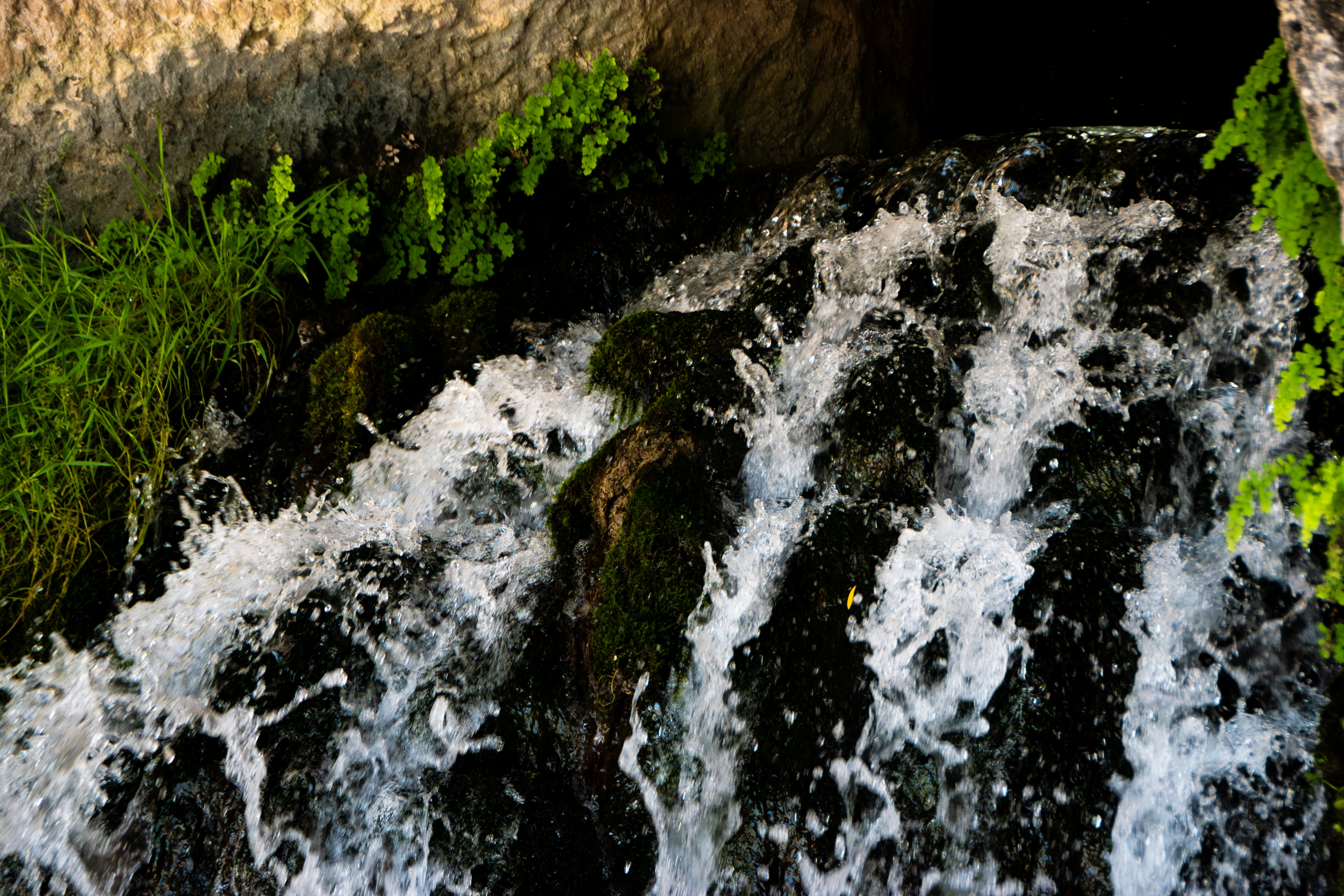
Water flowing into the grotto

The Grotta del Ninfeo is an artificial cavity in the rock of Temenite Hill (named after the Greek temenos, "sacred precinct") located in the Archaeological park of Neapolis in Syracuse.

== Terrace of Temenite Hill ==
The grotta is located near the highest part of the little rocky relief, on a rectangular terrace which verges on the Greek theatre and opens at the centre of a stone wall where a closed portico in the form of an "L" was once found. At the entrance there were statues dedicated to the Muses, three of which (dated to the 2nd century BC) are still preserved and are on display at the Museo archeologico regionale Paolo Orsi. The fountain is dedicated to the Ancient Greek cult of the nymphs, nature goddesses. The name nymphaeum for a monumental, decorated fountain derives from this.

The Syracusan nymphaeum is thought to have been the ancient location of the Mouseion (the sanctuary of the Muses), seat of the artistic guild, where the Syracusan actors gathered before descending into the theatre to put on comedies and tragedies in the time of Epicharmus and Aeschylus.

Regarding the Grotta del Ninfeo, the Syracusan Giuseppe Politi wrote in the nineteenth century:

There, with squared niches of various dimensions on all sides for votive tables and epitaphs, and further cells for catacombs, was a corridor in the living rock which we call the Sepulchral street and a large grotto opens at one point, with vestiges on the outside of triglyphs and with two aqueducts at the bottom, one vertically perpendicular to the other, encounter an artificial crack in the rock. This grotta is perennially supplied with water by one of these, on account of which it is called the Grotta dell'acqua. It may have originally been for the use of the victorious Ephebes of the Academy of Music just like the one that Pausanias says was at the Theatre of Athens. Alternatively, perhaps more likely, a nymphaeum, i.e. a grotto decorated with many statues of the nymphs, with water sports, as the name suggests.

— Giuseppe Politi, Siracusa pei viaggiatori [...] 1835

The grotto has a vaulted ceiling and inside it there is a rectangular tub in which the water collects before cascading from a cavity located at the bottom of the rock wall. Next to the entrance, there are some votive aedicula which were used for hero cults (Pinakes). To the east of the Grotta del Ninfeo, the last watermill from the Spanish period remains visible even today. It took water from the grotta and redirected it into the theatre after using it to mill grain. From nymphaeum, one continues to the Via dei Sepolcri and from there to the summit of the hill, where there are other Graeco-Roman monuments.

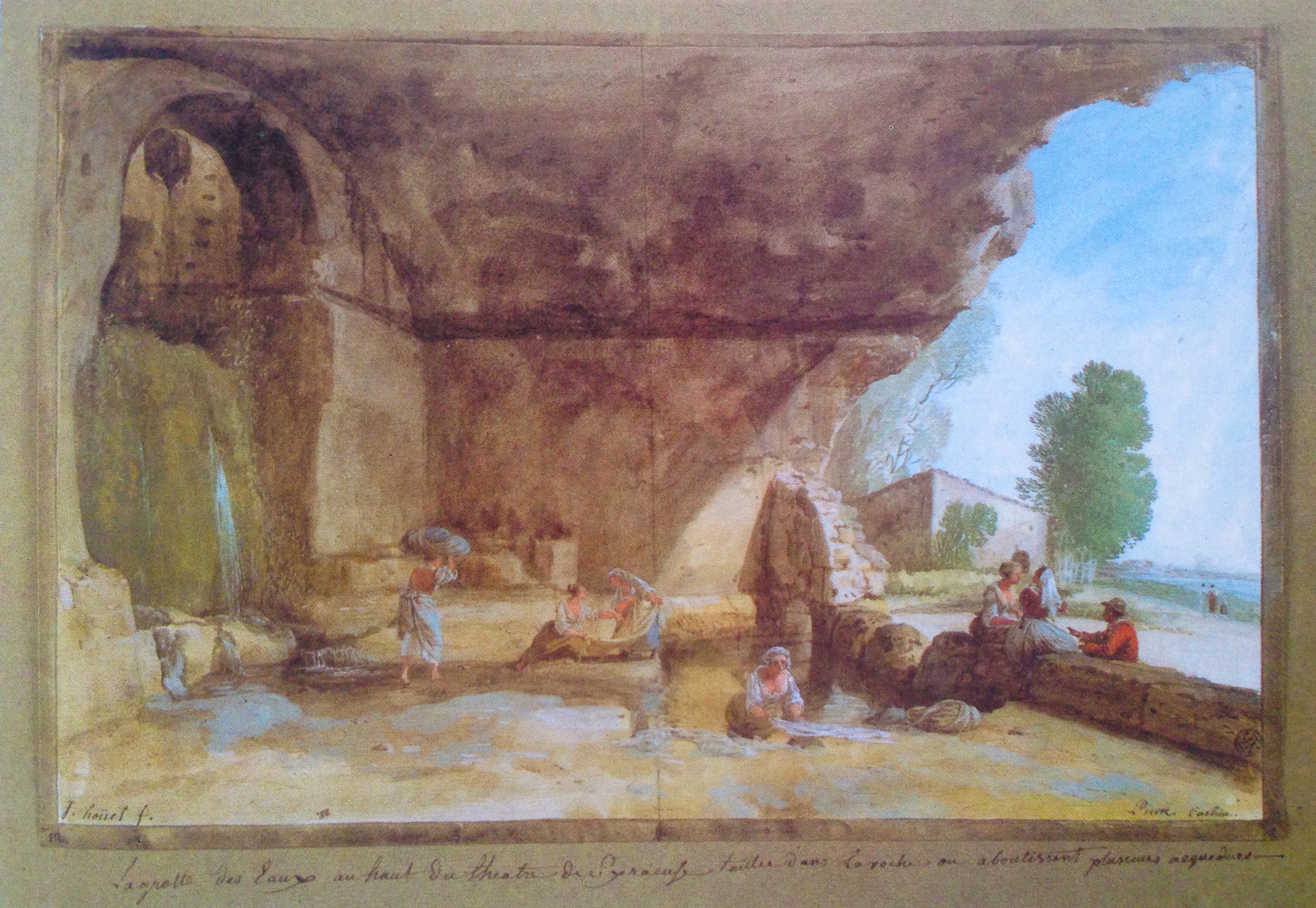
The Grotta del ninfeo as painted by Houel

The water that flows into the Grotta derives from two separate aqueducts, both of Greek date; one is called the Acquedotto del Ninfeo (Nymphaeum Aqueduct) after the Grotta, while the other is the Galermi Aqueduct.

== Depiction by Jean Hoüel ==
During one of his trips to Syracuse in the second half of the 1700s, the painter Jean-Pierre Houël depicted the Grotta del Ninfeo as he found it. The gouache shows a much deeper grotta than today, with water descending towards the theatre, where the mills were installed. In the grotta, some women are busy making cloth.

== Gallery ==
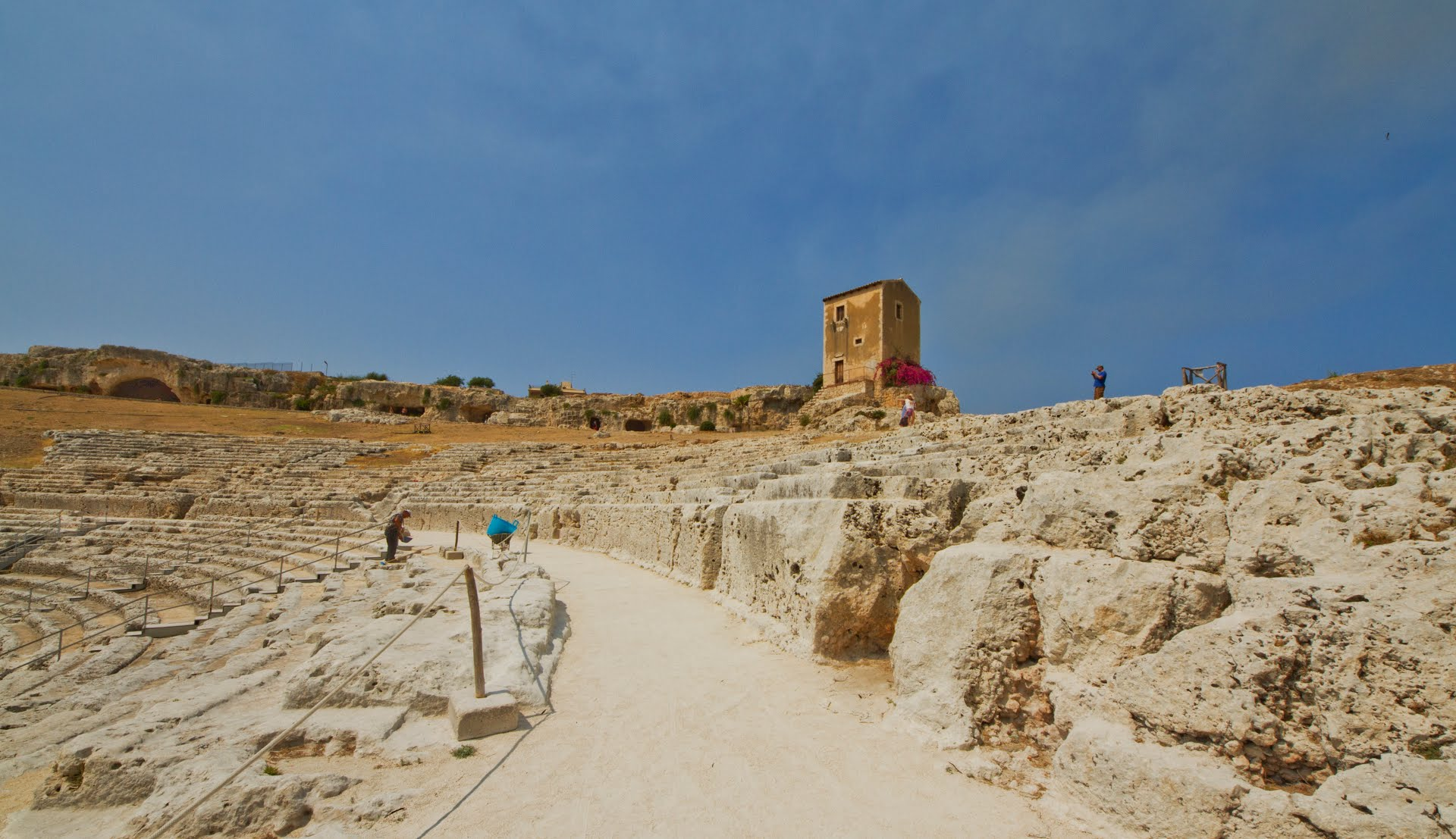
The final steps of the Greek theatre, the Casetta dei mugnai and the cavity of the Grotta del Ninfeo in the distance

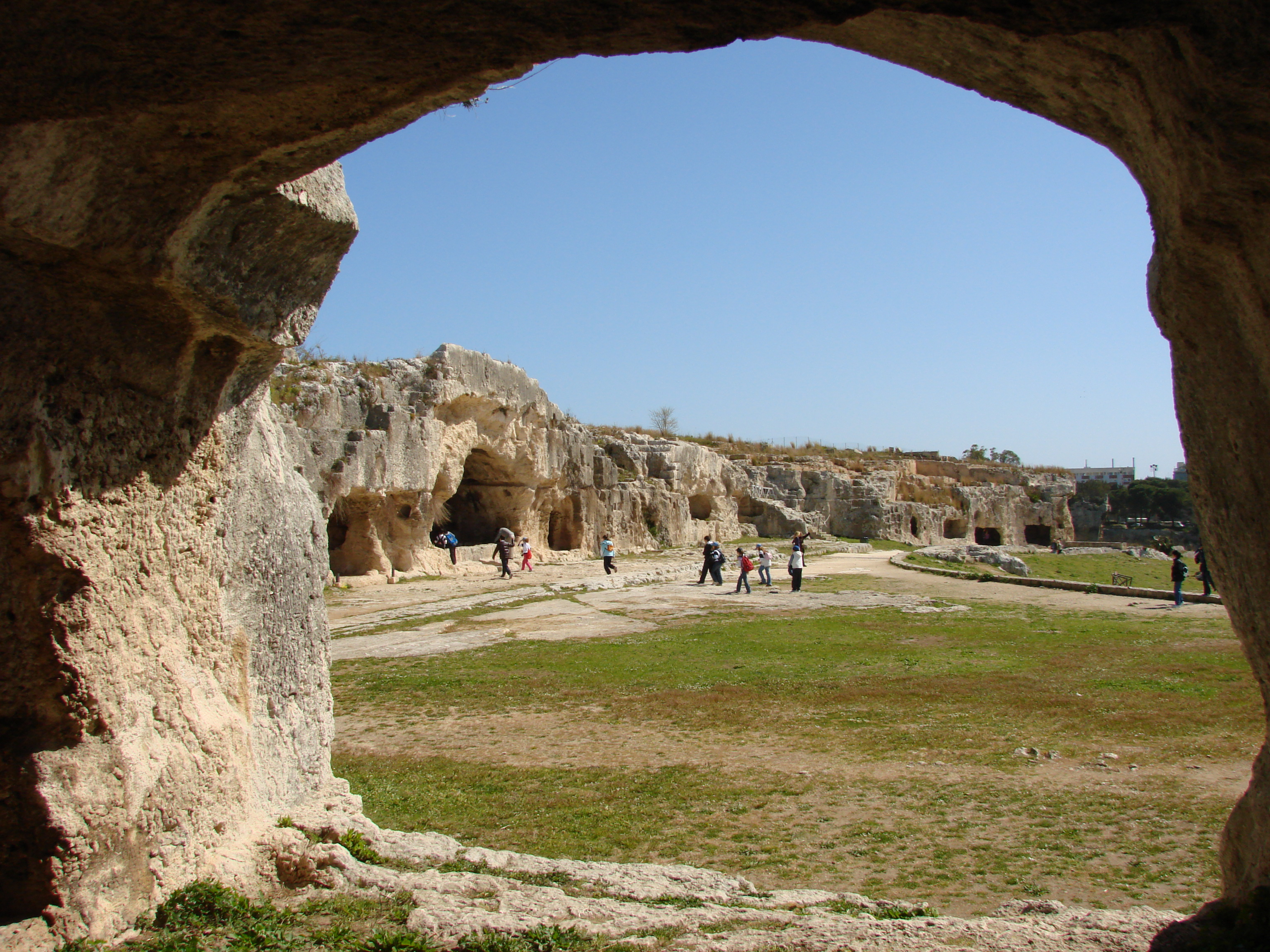
Image of the Temenite terrace from inside one of its cavities

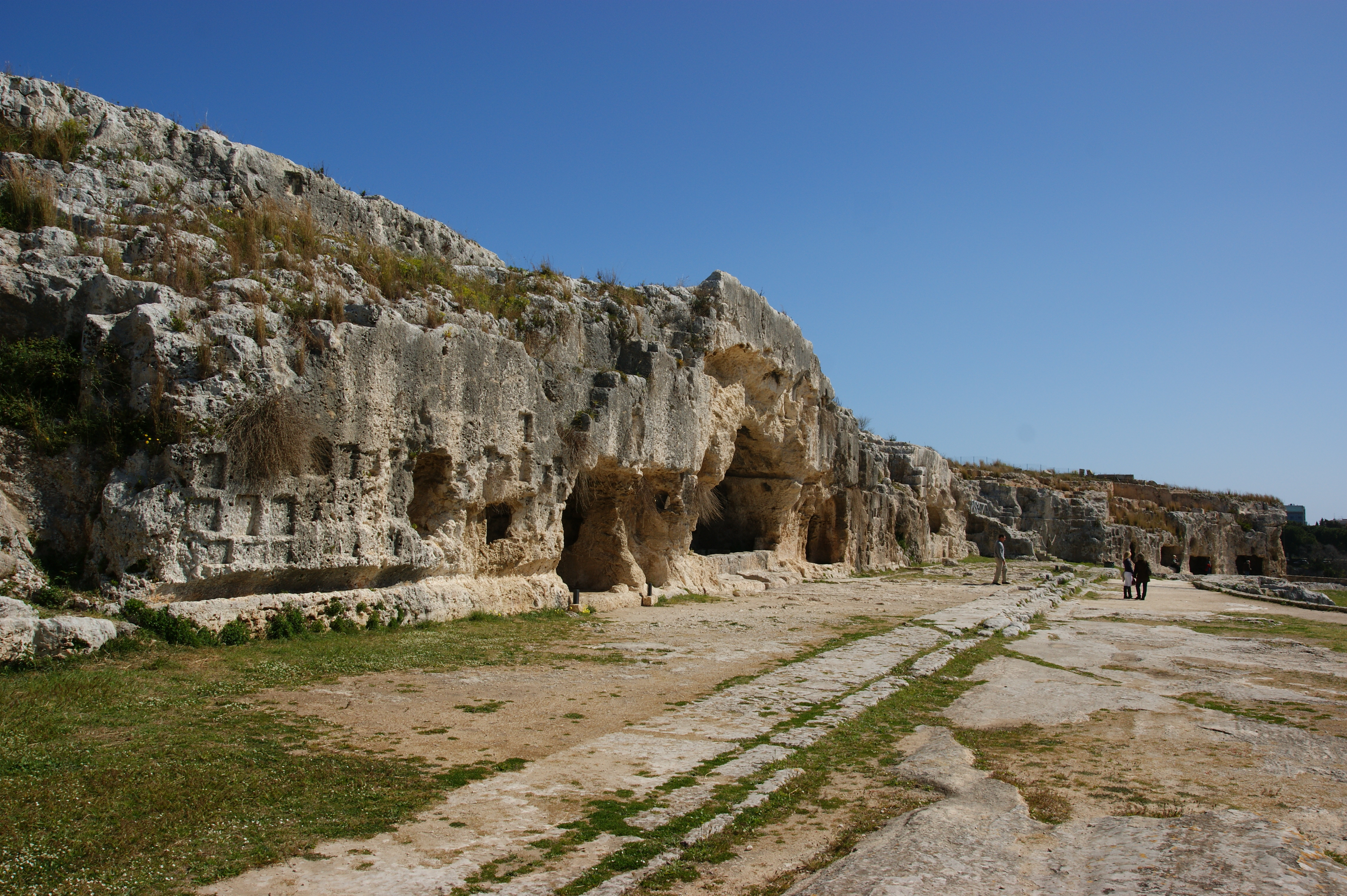
The votive aediculae in the rock wall of the hill near the nympaeum

== See also ==
- Nymphaeum
