= Nicola Bono =

Italian politician (born 1952)

- Bono in 2001

President of the Province of Syracuse
- In office 17 June 2008 – 18 June 2013
- Preceded by: Bruno Marziano
- Succeeded by: Office abolished

Undersecretary of State for Cultural Heritage and Activities
- In office 11 June 2001 – 17 May 2006
- Prime Minister: Silvio Berlusconi

Member of the Chamber of Deputies
- In office 15 April 1994 – 27 April 2006

Member of the Sicilian Regional Assembly
- In office 10 July 1986 – 3 May 1994
- Constituency: Syracuse

Personal details
- Born: 9 October 1952 (age 73) Modica, Province of Ragusa, Italy
- Party: Italian Social Movement (until 1995); National Alliance (1995–2009); The People of Freedom (2009–2013); Act to Stop the Decline (2014)
- Occupation: Accountant

Nicola Bono (born 9 October 1952) is an Italian politician who served as a member of the Chamber of Deputies from 1994 to 2006, as undersecretary of State for the Ministry of Cultural Heritage and Activities and Tourism from 2001 to 2006, and as president of the Province of Syracuse from 2008 to 2013. He was also a member of the Sicilian Regional Assembly from 1986 to 1992.
