= Ferla =

- Comune
- Comune di Ferla
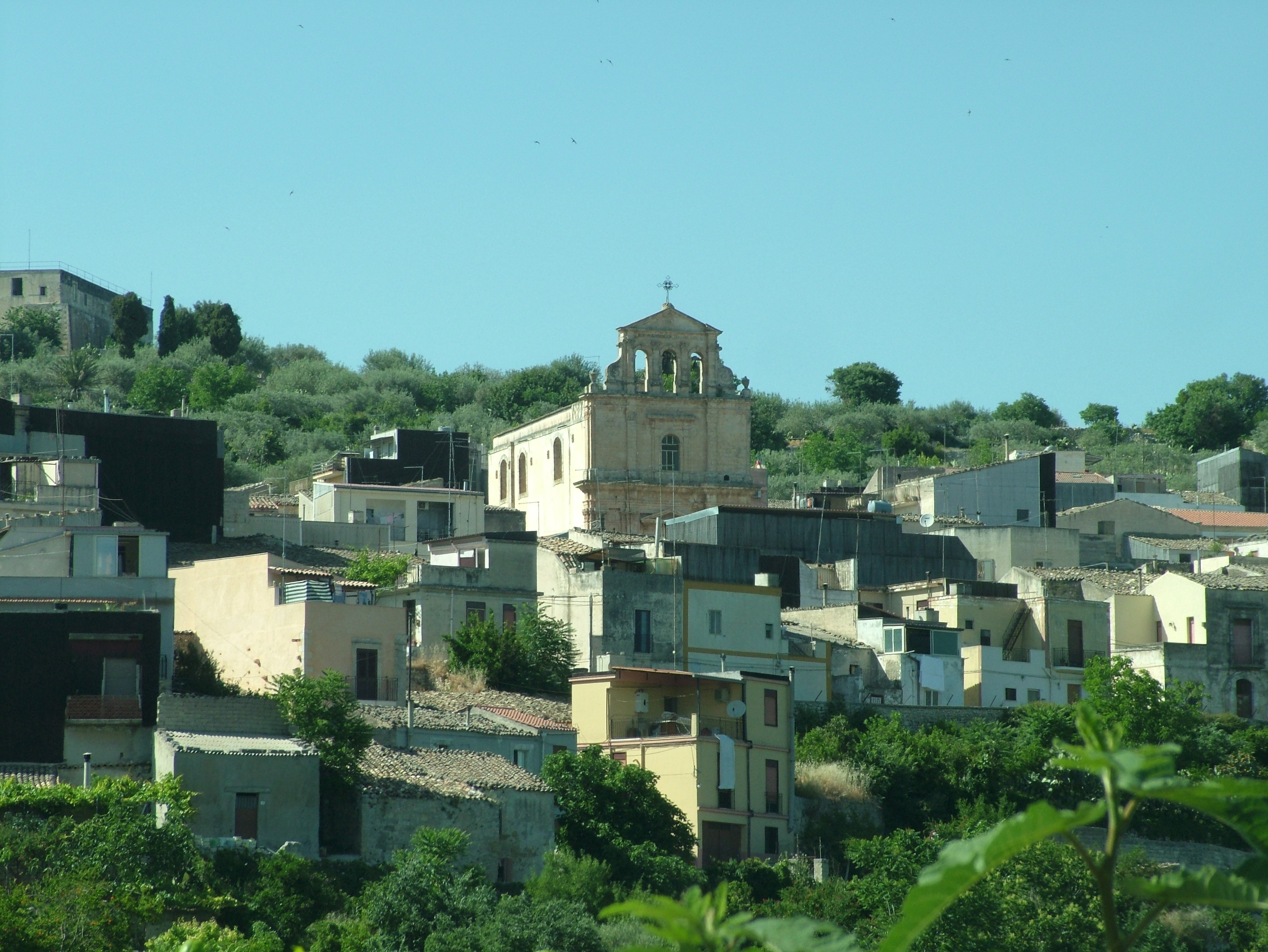
- Ferla

- Location within Italy Location within Sicily
- Coordinates: 37°7′N 14°57′E
- Country: Italy
- Region: Sicily
- Province: Syracuse (SR)

Government
  - Mayor: Michelangelo Giansiracusa (Action)

Area
  - Total: 24.9 km^{2} (9.6 sq mi)
- Elevation: 556 m (1,824 ft)

Population (30 November 2017)
  - Total: 2,450
  - Density: 98.4/km^{2} (255/sq mi)
- Demonym: Ferlesi
- Time zone: UTC+1 (CET)
  - Summer (DST): UTC+2 (CEST)
- Postal code: 96010
- Dialing code: 0931
- Patron saint: Saint Sebastian
- Saint day: 20 July
- Website: Official website

Ferla (Sicilian: A Ferra) is a town and comune in the Province of Syracuse, Sicily (southern Italy). It is one of I Borghi più belli d'Italia ("The most beautiful villages of Italy").

The Necropolis of Pantalica, part of the UNESCO World Heritage Site of "Syracuse and the Rocky Necropolis of Pantalica" is situated between Ferla and Sortino.
