= Calcinara =

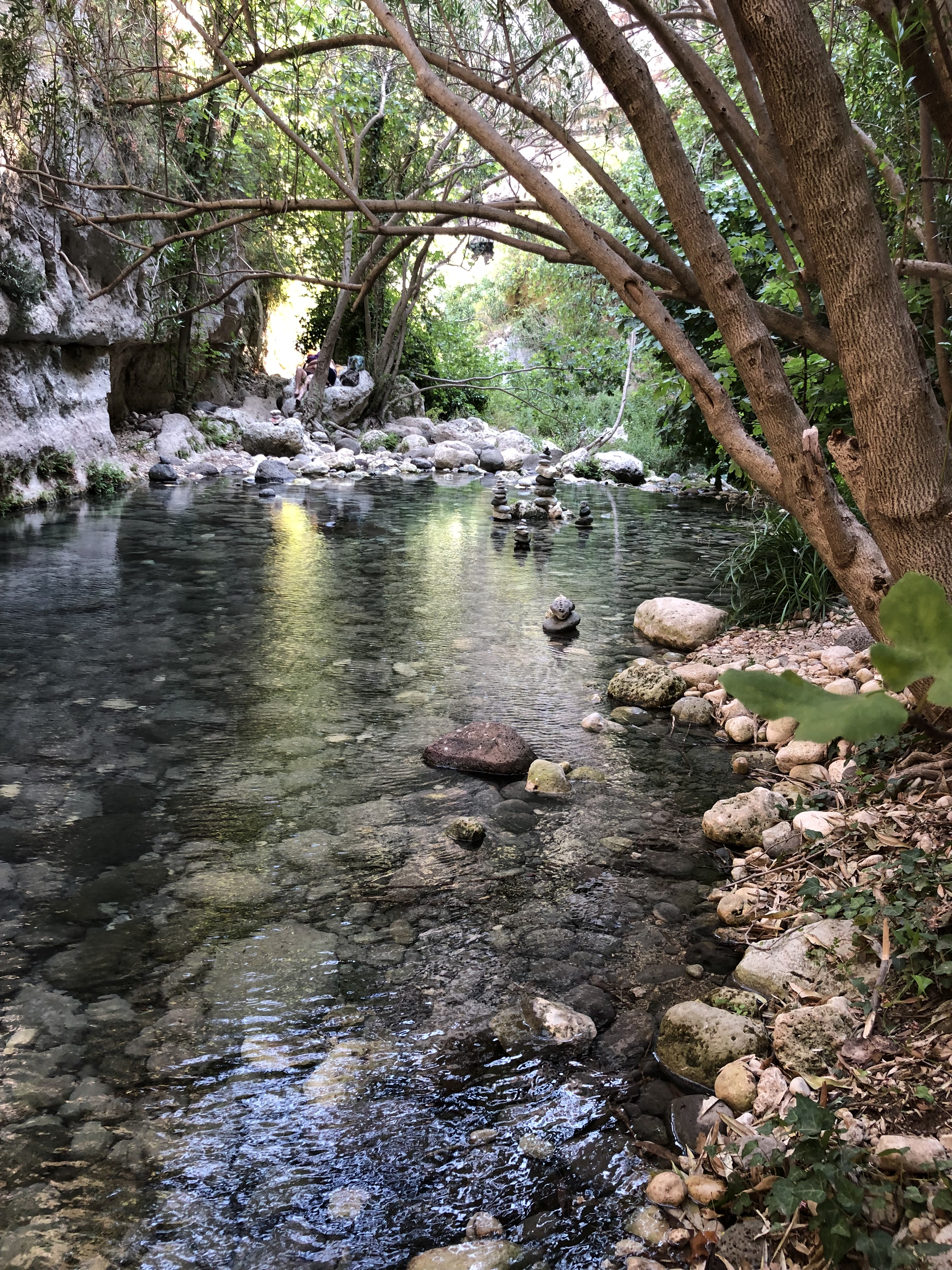

Location
- Country: Italy
- Region: Sicily

Physical characteristics
- Mouth: Anapo
  - coordinates: 37.1398°N 15.0344°E

Basin features
- Progression: Anapo→ Ionian Sea

The Calcinara is a river in southeastern Sicily in Italy. It flows into the Anapo near the archaeological site of Pantalica.
