= List of presidents of the Province of Syracuse =

President of the Province of Syracuse
- Presidente della Provincia di Siracusa; Presidente del Libero consorzio comunale di Siracusa

- Incumbent; Michelangelo Giansiracusa since 28 April 2025
- Inaugural holder: Michele Tedeschi Rizzone
- Formation: 1889

The president of the Province of Syracuse was the head of the provincial administration of Syracuse, a local government authority in Sicily, Italy. Since 2025, the chairman of the provincial administration is the president of the Free Municipal Consortium (Libero consorzio comunale).

== List ==
=== Presidents of the Provincial Deputation ===
No.	Portrait	Name	Term of office		Party
No.	Portrait	Name	Took office	Left office	Party
1		Michele Tedeschi Rizzone	1889	1890	Historical Left
2		Alessandro Specchi	1890	1892	?
3		Antonio Bruno Modica	1892	1893	?
(1)		Michele Tedeschi Rizzone	1893	1894	Historical Left
4		Sebastiano Italia	1894	1899	?
5		Gioacchino Iacono	1899	1905	?
6		Luigi Vinci	1905	1908	?
7		Lorenzo Cocuzza	1908	1913	?
(6)		Luigi Vinci	1914	?	?

=== Presidents of the Province ===
No.	Portrait	Name	Term of office		Party
No.	Portrait	Name	Took office	Left office	Party
		?	?	?	?
		Salvatore Aparo	June 1985	2 July 1990	Italian Socialist Party
		Armando Foti	2 July 1990	13 November 1991	Christian Democracy
		Arnaldo La Rocca	13 November 1991	14 May 1993	Christian Democracy
		Salvatore Baio	14 May 1993	11 June 1994	Democratic Party of the Left
		Mario Cavallaro	15 June 1994	8 June 1998	National Alliance
		Bruno Marziano	8 June 1998	10 June 2003	Democrats of the Left
		Bruno Marziano	10 June 2003	27 March 2008	Democrats of the Left
–		Onofrio Zaccone (Regional commissioner)	27 March 2008	17 June 2008	—
		Nicola Bono	17 June 2008	18 June 2013	The People of Freedom

=== Regional commissioners (2013–2025) ===
Name	Term of office	
Name	Took office	Left office
Alessandro Giacchetti	20 June 2013	17 February 2014
Ettore Leotta	24 February 2014	28 February 2014
Mario Ortello	14 April 2014	30 October 2014
Nicolò Lauricella	30 October 2014	9 December 2014
Rosaria Barresi	9 December 2014	8 April 2015
Nicolò Lauricella	8 April 2015	29 April 2015
Giovanni Corso	29 April 2015	31 July 2015
Antonino Lutri	27 August 2015	29 July 2016
Giovanni Arnone	12 August 2016	30 January 2018
Carmela Floreno	30 January 2018	31 December 2019
Domenico Pecorella	2 January 2020	31 August 2023
Mario La Rocca	15 September 2023	28 April 2025

=== Presidents of the Free Municipal Consortium (2025–present) ===
No.	Portrait	Name	Term of office		Party
No.	Portrait	Name	Start	End	Party
1		Michelangelo Giansiracusa	28 April 2025	Incumbent	Action

== Sources ==
- "Storia amministrativa dell'ente". Ministero dell'Interno.
- Menichini, Piera (2005). "I presidenti delle Province dall'Unità alla Grande guerra: repertorio analitico". Storia Amministrazione Costituzione (13): 290–291.
