= Michelangelo Giansiracusa =

Italian politician (born 1977)

President of the Free Municipal Consortium of Syracuse
- Incumbent
- Assumed office 28 April 2025
- Preceded by: Office established

Mayor of Ferla
- Incumbent
- Assumed office 1 June 2011
- Preceded by: Alfio Speranza

Personal details
- Born: 2 August 1977 (age 49) Syracuse, Sicily, Italy
- Party: Action
- Occupation: Lawyer

Michelangelo Giansiracusa (born 2 August 1977) is an Italian politician and lawyer who has served as president of the Free Municipal Consortium of Syracuse since 2025 and as mayor of Ferla since 2011.

== Career ==
Giansiracusa was elected to the municipal council of Ferla in 2002 and became mayor of the town in 2011. He was re-elected mayor in 2016 and 2021. He joined Action and was appointed regional commissioner of the party in Sicily in December 2022.

In April 2025, Giansiracusa was elected president of the Free Municipal Consortium of Syracuse as a candidate supported by Action, Movement for Autonomy, Christian Democracy, and Lega. He received 65,468 weighted votes (86.2%), defeating Giuseppe Stefio, mayor of Carlentini. His election restored an elected political leadership to the former Province of Syracuse after twelve years of extraordinary administration.
