= Necropolis of Pantalica =

Collection of ancient cemeteries in Sicily, Italy

UNESCO World Heritage Site
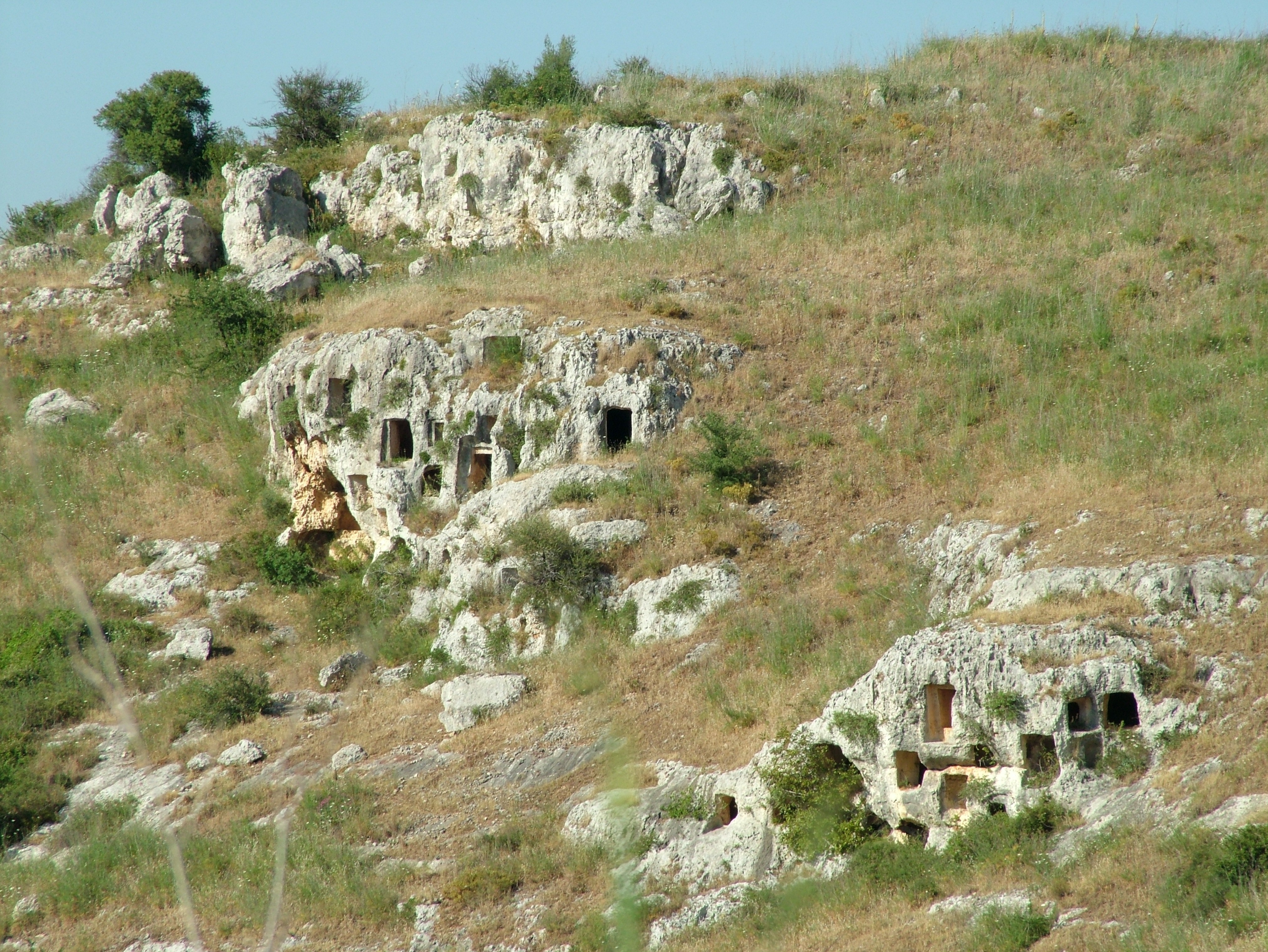

- Location within Sicily Location within Italy
- Location: Sortino, Province of Syracuse, Sicily, Italy
- Part of: Syracuse and the Rocky Necropolis of Pantalica
- Reference: 1200-001
- Inscription: 2006 (30th Session)
- Area: 205.86 ha (508.7 acres)
- Buffer zone: 3,699.7 ha (9,142 acres)
- Website: www.pantalica.org
- Coordinates: 37°8′30″N 15°1′42″E

The Necropolis of Pantalica is a collection of cemeteries with rock-cut chamber tombs in southeast Sicily, Italy. Dating from the 13th to the 7th centuries BC, it was thought that the site held over 5,000 tombs, although the most recent estimate suggests a figure of just under 4,000. They extend around the flanks of a large promontory located at the junction of the Anapo river with its tributary, the Calcinara, about 23 km (14 mi) northwest of Syracuse. Together with the city of Syracuse, Pantalica was listed as a UNESCO World Heritage Site in 2005.

== Geography ==
Pantalica is located on a limestone promontory surrounded by a deep gorge formed by the Anapo and Calcinara rivers between the towns of Ferla and Sortino in south-eastern Sicily. In addition to its archaeological interest it is an important nature reserve (Riserva Naturale Orientata Pantalica), with a variety of local flora and fauna and natural caves (notably the Grotta dei Pipistrelli (Bat Cave)). Various pathways facilitate visitor access, including a disused railway track (dismantled in 1956) along the Anapo valley bottom. The promontory can be accessed directly by car from Ferla, or by walking down the old mule track from the parking place on the road from Sortino and crossing over the Calcinara stream.

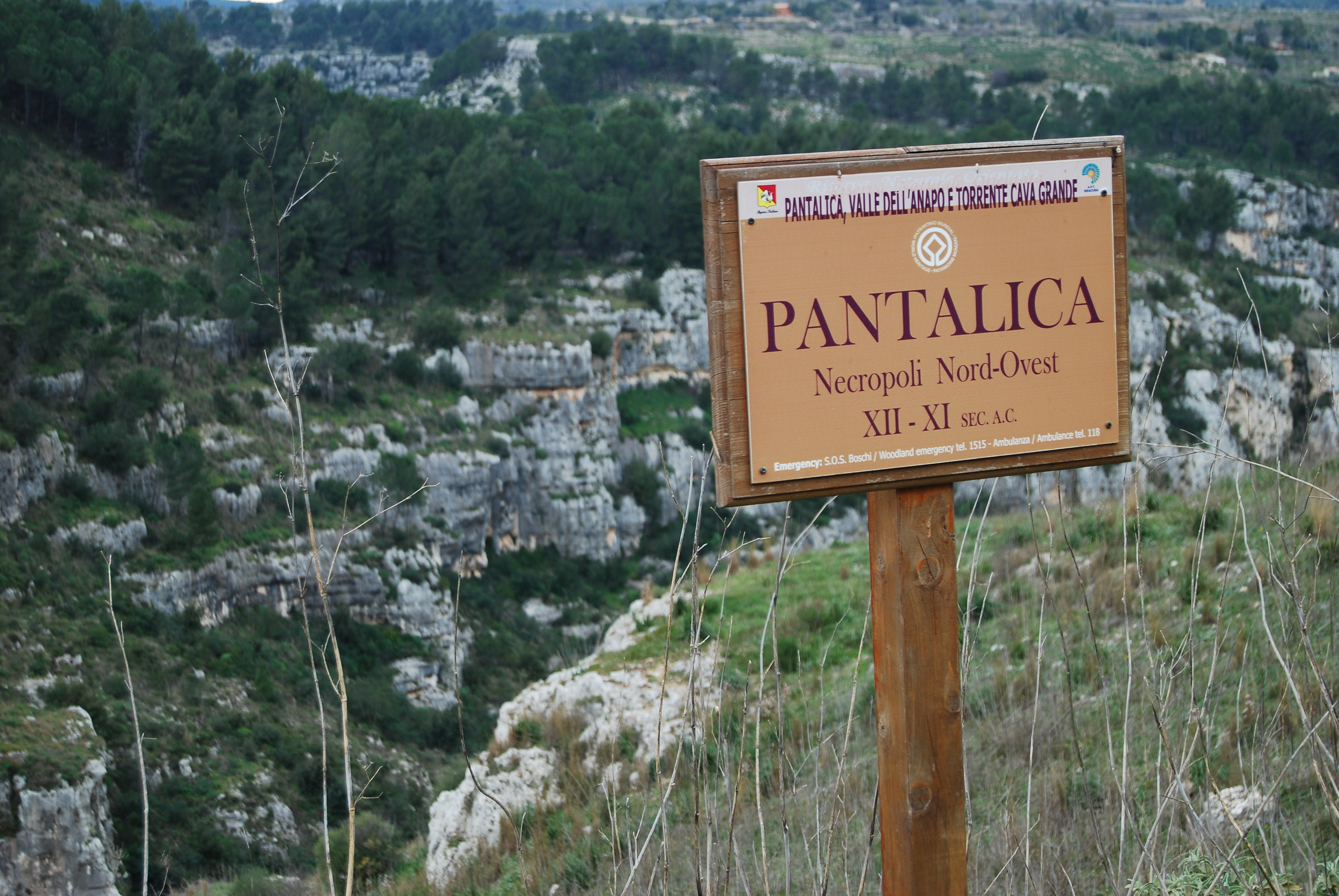
The site marker for the necropoli

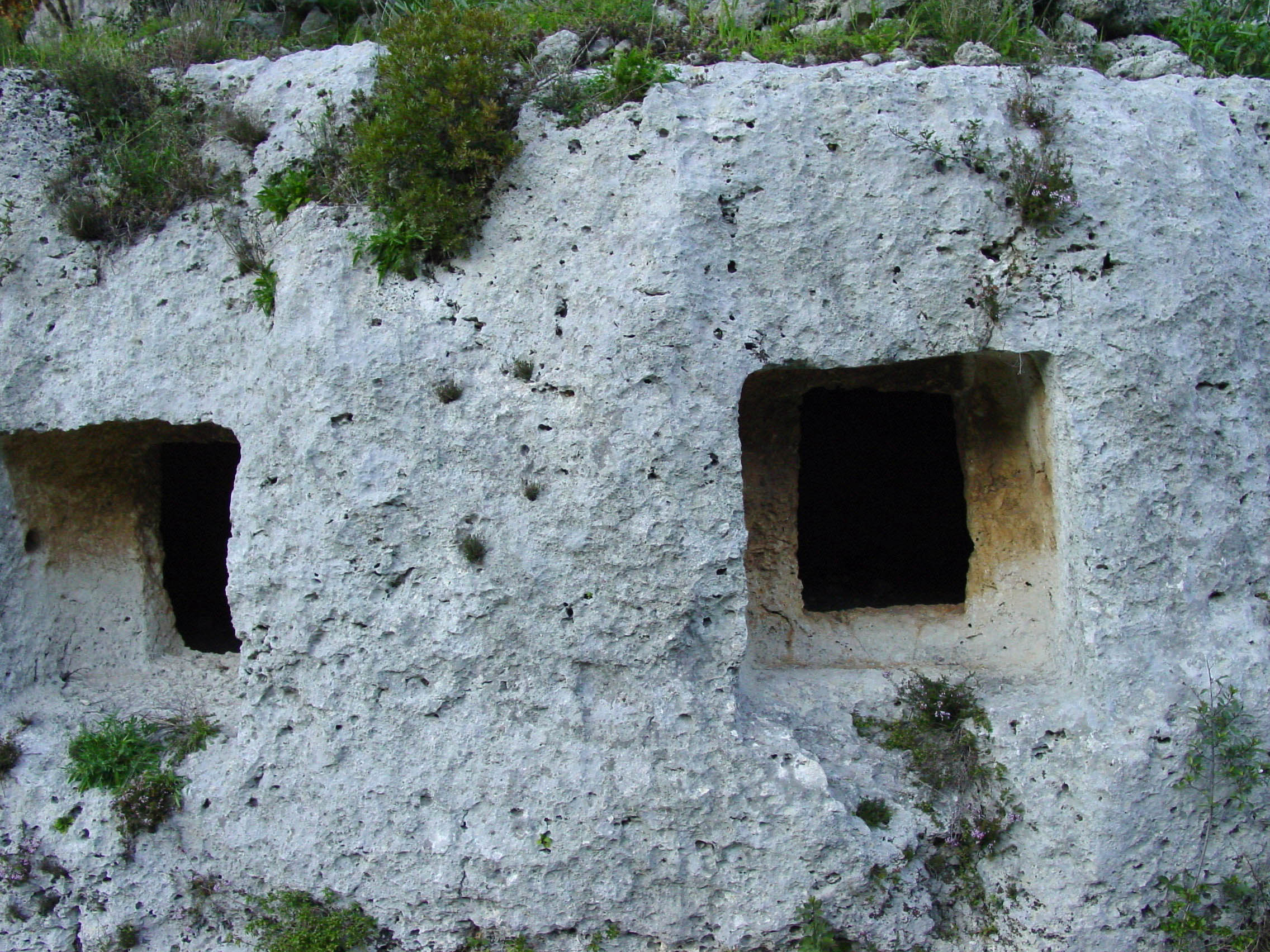
Square rock-cut tombs in Pantalica

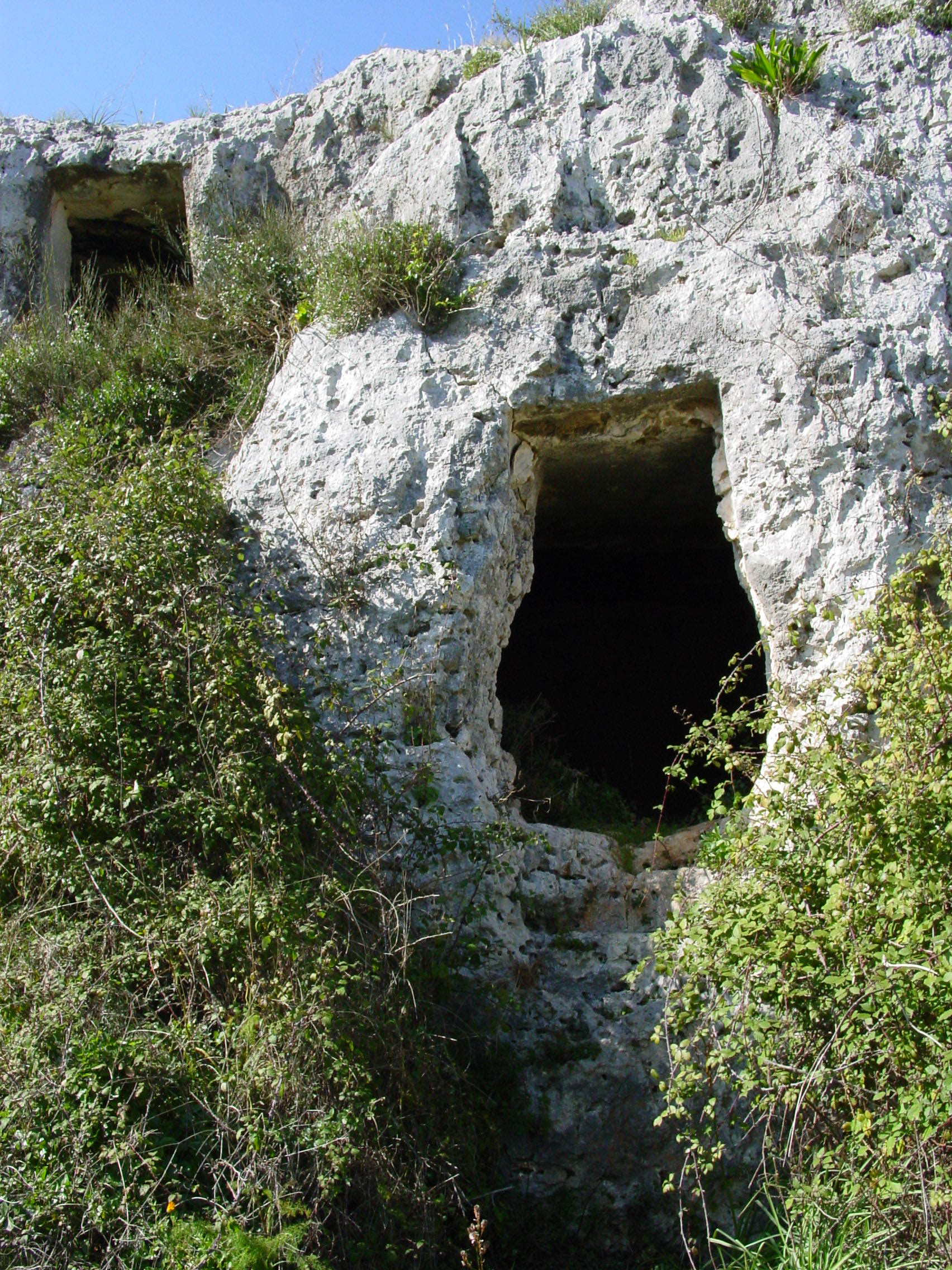
Tomb entrance in Pantalica

== History ==
In the 13th century BC, some Sicilian coastal settlements were abandoned, possibly due to the arrival of the Sicels on the island and the onset of more unsettled conditions. New large sites, like Pantalica, appeared in the hilly coastal hinterlands, probably chosen for defensive reasons.

Pantalica evidently flourished for about 600 years, from about 1250 to 650 BC. The current name of the site probably dates from the Early Middle Ages or Arab period. The ancient name of the site is uncertain, but is associated by some archeologists with Hybla, after a Sicel king named Hyblon, who is mentioned by Thucydides in connection with the foundation of the early Greek colony at Megara Hyblaea in the year 728 BC. For several centuries before Greek colonization, Pantalica was undoubtedly one of the main sites of eastern Sicily, dominating the surrounding territory, including subsidiary settlements. By about 650 BC, however, it seems to have been a victim of the expansion of the city of Syracuse, which established an outpost at Akrai (near Palazzolo Acreide) at this time. Nevertheless, it was still occupied during classical antiquity, since finds of the 4th and 3rd centuries BC are attested, as well as during the late antique or Byzantine periods. After the 12th century it was probably largely deserted, and overshadowed by Sortino.

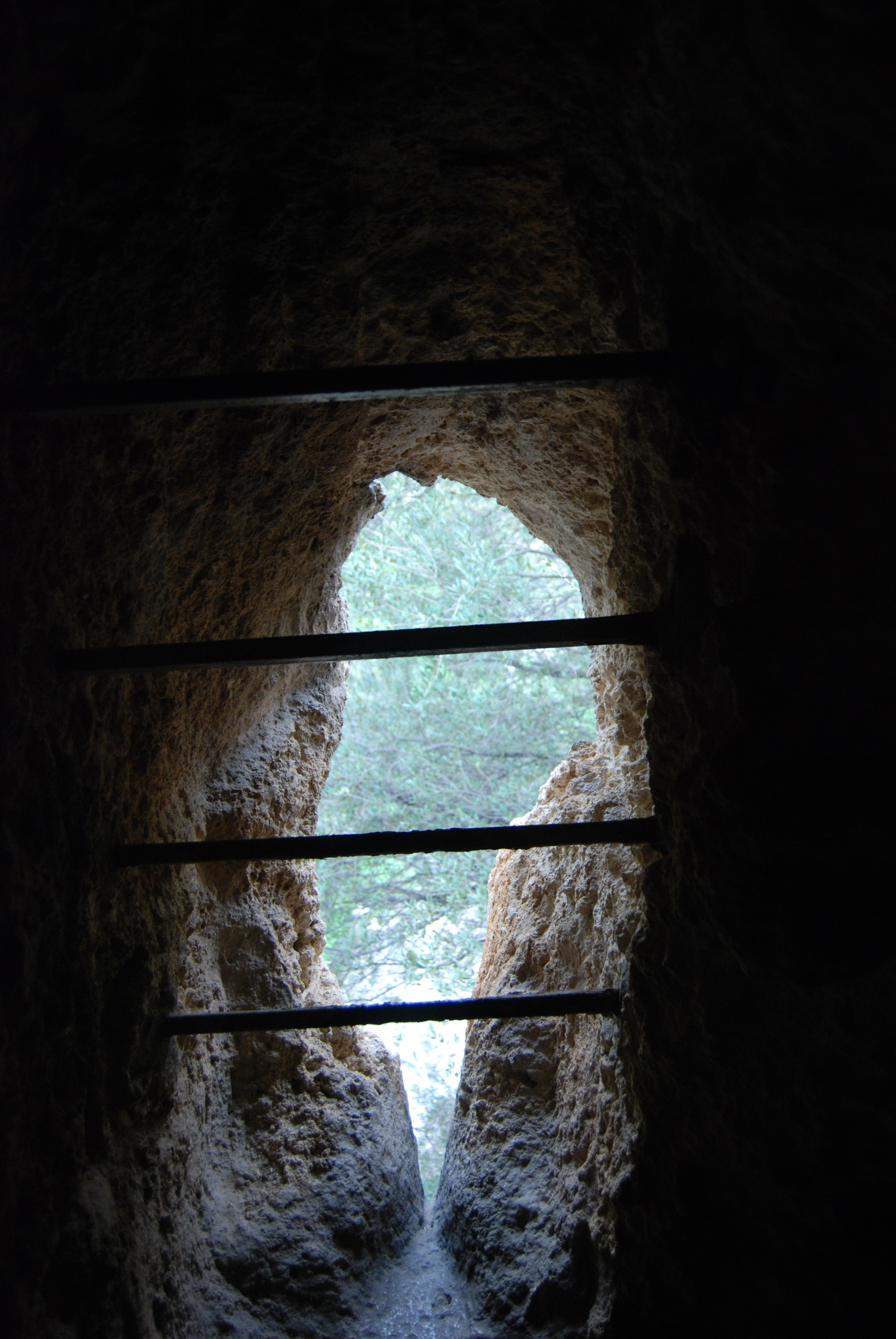
The view looking out of a tomb

The remains visible today consist mainly of numerous prehistoric burial chambers cut into the limestone rock, sometimes provided with a porch or short entrance corridor in front of the burial chamber, originally sealed with stones or a slab. There are also some larger rock-cut houses of uncertain date, often said to be Byzantine, but possibly of earlier origin. The so-called anaktoron, or princely palace, located near the top of the hill, is also controversial. Thought by some archeologists originally to have been a Late Bronze Age building, inspired by palatial buildings of the Bronze Age, it was more certainly occupied in the Byzantine period. The remains of a large ditch, cut into the limestone, are clearly visible at Filiporto on the western side of the promontory, nearest to Ferla. This probably dates to the 4th century BC, and represents a defensive work of Greek military design, possibly in line with a policy of Dionysius of Syracuse, designed to secure allied sites in the hinterland. There are also three small medieval rock-cut chapels known respectively as the Grotta del Crocifisso (near the North cemetery), the Grotta di San Nicolicchio (on the southern side), and the Grotta di San Micidario (at Filiporto), which preserve very faint traces of frescoes, and attest the presence of small monastic communities.

The site was mainly excavated between 1895 and 1910 by the Italian archeologist, Paolo Orsi, although most of the tombs had already been looted long before his time. The finds excavated by Orsi are on display in the Archaeological Museum in Syracuse. They include characteristic red-burnished pottery vessels and metal objects, including weaponry (small knives and daggers) and items of dress, such as bronze fibulae and rings, which were placed with the deceased in the tombs. Most of the tombs contained between one and seven individuals of all ages and both sexes. Many tombs were evidently re-opened periodically for more burials. The average human life span at this time was probably around 30 years of age. The size of the prehistoric population is hard to estimate from the available data, but might have been 1000 people or more.

== Main monuments ==
Pantalica has five cemeteries spread over a large area:

- The necropolis of Filiporto consists of almost 1000 tombs, located on the southwestern side of the promontory (accessed by road from Ferla). In the same area are the remains of a defensive rock-cut ditch of later date (probably 4th century BC) traversing the promontory at its narrowest point.
- The North West necropolis is one of the earliest (12th and 11th century BC), and is traversed by the tarmac road from Ferla.
- The Cavetta necropolis has tombs and rock-cut houses of the prehistoric and later periods, and can be seen from the road and designated viewing platforms.
- The North necropolis is a spectacular cemetery of about 1000 tombs covering very steep slopes overlooking the Calcinara river, best seen from the track coming from Sortino and from viewing platforms near the path. Remains of large rock-cut dwellings are on the gentler slopes to the east.
- The South necropolis extends along the Anapo river for over 1 kilometre and is easily seen from the trackway at the bottom of the valley (a path leads down to it from the anaktoron). The old railway station, restored, has information about local fauna and flora.

The so-called Anaktoron (a Mycenaean princely palace) on the top of the hill is a multi-roomed building of large blocks, with various rectangular rooms, excavated in the 19th century by Paolo Orsi. Its origins are obscure (see above) but it was certainly used in the Byzantine period, as attested by roof tiles and pottery. Since no other prehistoric houses have been found on the hilltop, which is rather eroded, the location of the original prehistoric residential quarters remains uncertain. There may have been various clusters of habitation associated with each major burial zone.

== Bibliography ==
- L. Bernabo Brea Sicily before the Greeks. (London: Thames and Hudson 1957).
- R. Leighton Sicily before History (London: Duckworth 1999).
- R. Leighton “Pantalica (Sicily) from the Late Bronze Age to the Middle Ages. A new survey and interpretation of the rock-cut monuments.” American Journal of Archaeology 115 (2011) pp. 447–464.
