= Sortino =

- Comune
- Comune di Sortino
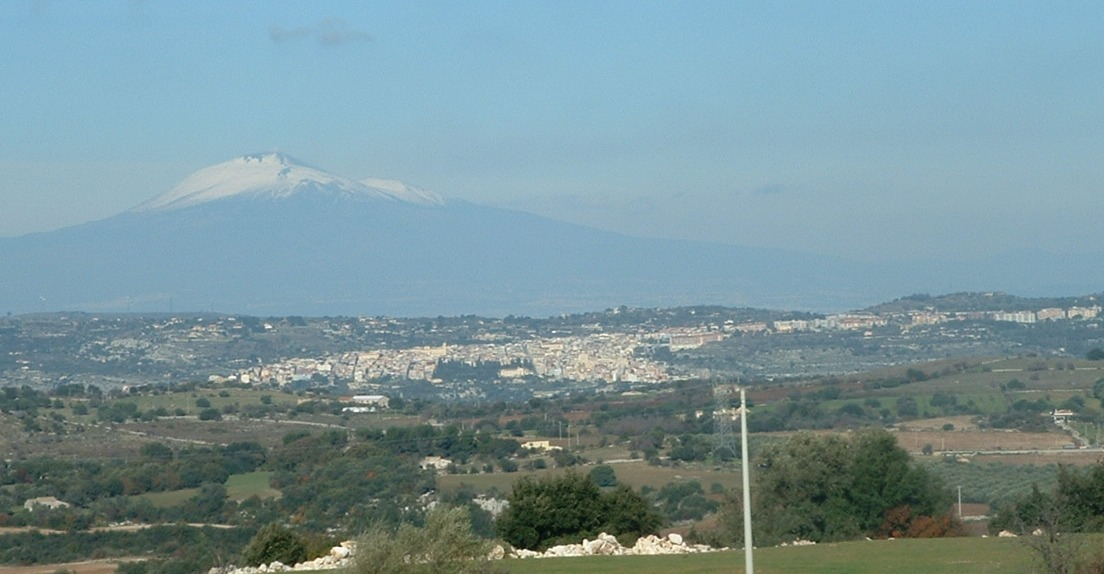
- Aerial view of Sortino

- Coat of arms

- Location within Italy Location within Sicily
- Coordinates: 37°10′N 15°2′E
- Country: Italy
- Region: Sicily
- Province: Syracuse (SR)

Government
  - Mayor: Vincenzo Parlato

Area
  - Total: 93.33 km^{2} (36.03 sq mi)
- Elevation: 438 m (1,437 ft)

Population (30 November 2017)
  - Total: 8,570
  - Density: 91.8/km^{2} (238/sq mi)
- Demonym: Sortinesi
- Time zone: UTC+1 (CET)
  - Summer (DST): UTC+2 (CEST)
- Postal code: 96010
- Dialing code: 0931
- Patron saint: St. Sophia
- Saint day: 10 September
- Website: Official website

Sortino (Sicilian: Sciurtinu) is a town and comune in the Province of Syracuse, Sicily (Italy). It is located in the Anapo river valley.

The Necropolis of Pantalica, part of the UNESCO World Heritage Site of "Syracuse and the Rocky Necropolis of Pantalica" is situated between Sortino and Ferla.

== History ==
Ancient Sortino was built on the even more ancient city of Xuthia, known to the Normans as Panterga, and was destroyed during the earthquake of 1693. The modern city is located on the top of a hill, from the former one the cellars of the fortress and the ruins of buildings have been preserved.

== Demographics ==
Historical population

Year	Pop.	±%
1861	8,501	—
1871	8,815	+3.7%
1881	9,024	+2.4%
1901	11,154	+23.6%
1911	12,351	+10.7%
1921	11,241	−9.0%
1931	10,216	−9.1%
1936	10,058	−1.5%

Year	Pop.	±%
1951	10,432	+3.7%
1961	9,823	−5.8%
1971	8,794	−10.5%
1981	8,908	+1.3%
1991	9,245	+3.8%
2001	9,092	−1.7%
2011	8,907	−2.0%
2021	8,298	−6.8%

Source: ISTAT

== Main sights ==
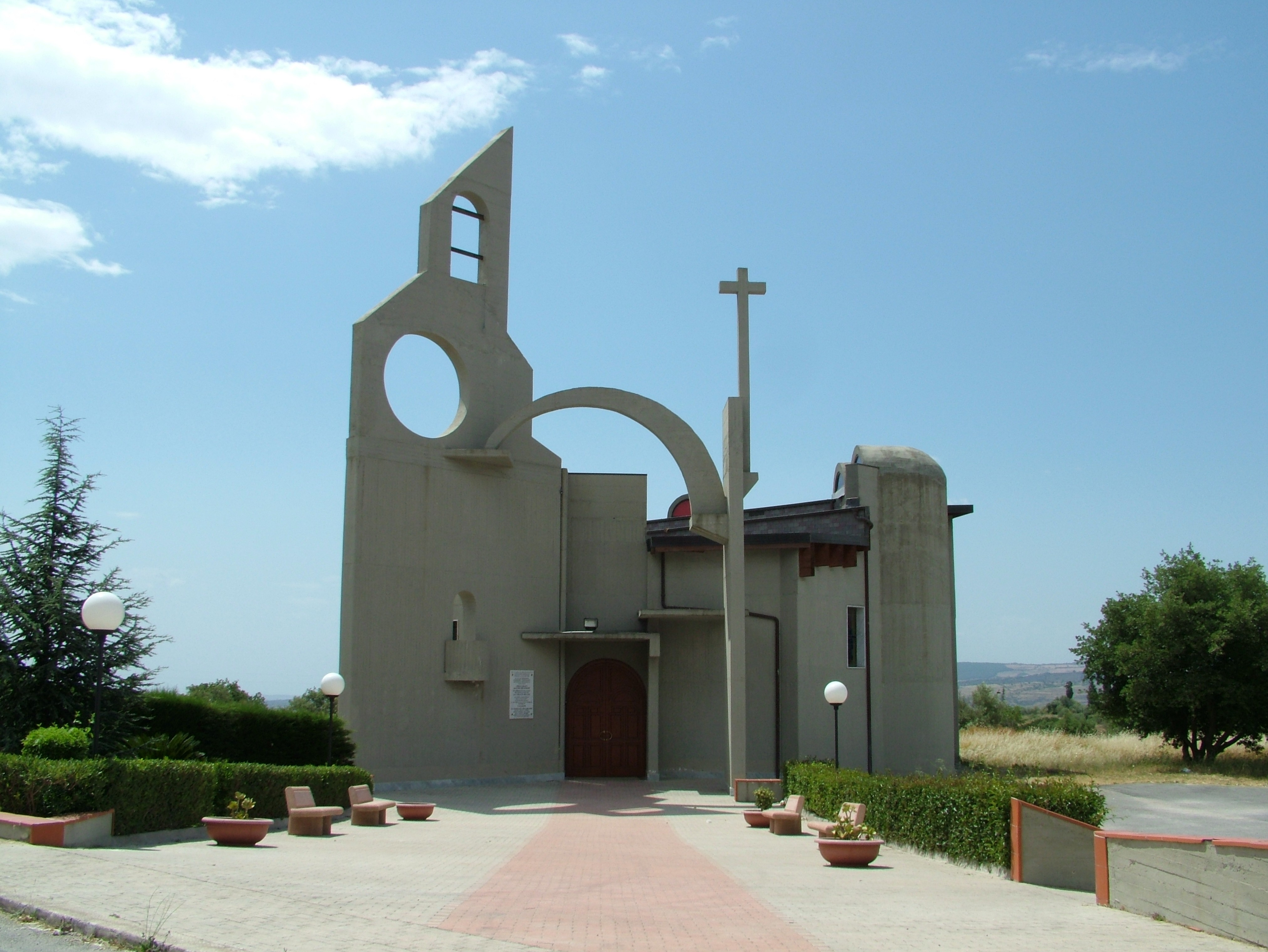
The abstract shaped Chiesa di San Giuseppe.

Sortino has fifteen Roman Catholic churches. The main one is the Chiesa Madre di S. Giovanni Evangelista. Others are:

- Chiesa del Monastero
- Chiesa di S. Sebastiano
- Chiesa di S. Sofia
- Chiesa di S. Benedetto
- Chiesa di S. Pietro
- Chiesa dei Cappuccini
- Chiesa del Collegio
- Chiesa di S. Antonio Abate
- Chiesa di S. Mauro
- Chiesa della SS. Annunziata
- Chiesa del Purgatorio
- Chiesa del Carmine
- Chiesa di S. Francesco d'Assisi
- Chiesa di S. Giuseppe

== Twin towns ==
- Riedstadt, Germany
- Murter, Croatia
