= Province of Syracuse =

Coordinates: 37°5′N 15°17′E

Province of Syracuse Provincia di Siracusa (Italian) Pruvincia di Saragusa (Sicilian)
- Province
- Free Municipal Consortium of Syracuse; Libero consorzio comunale di Siracusa (Italian)
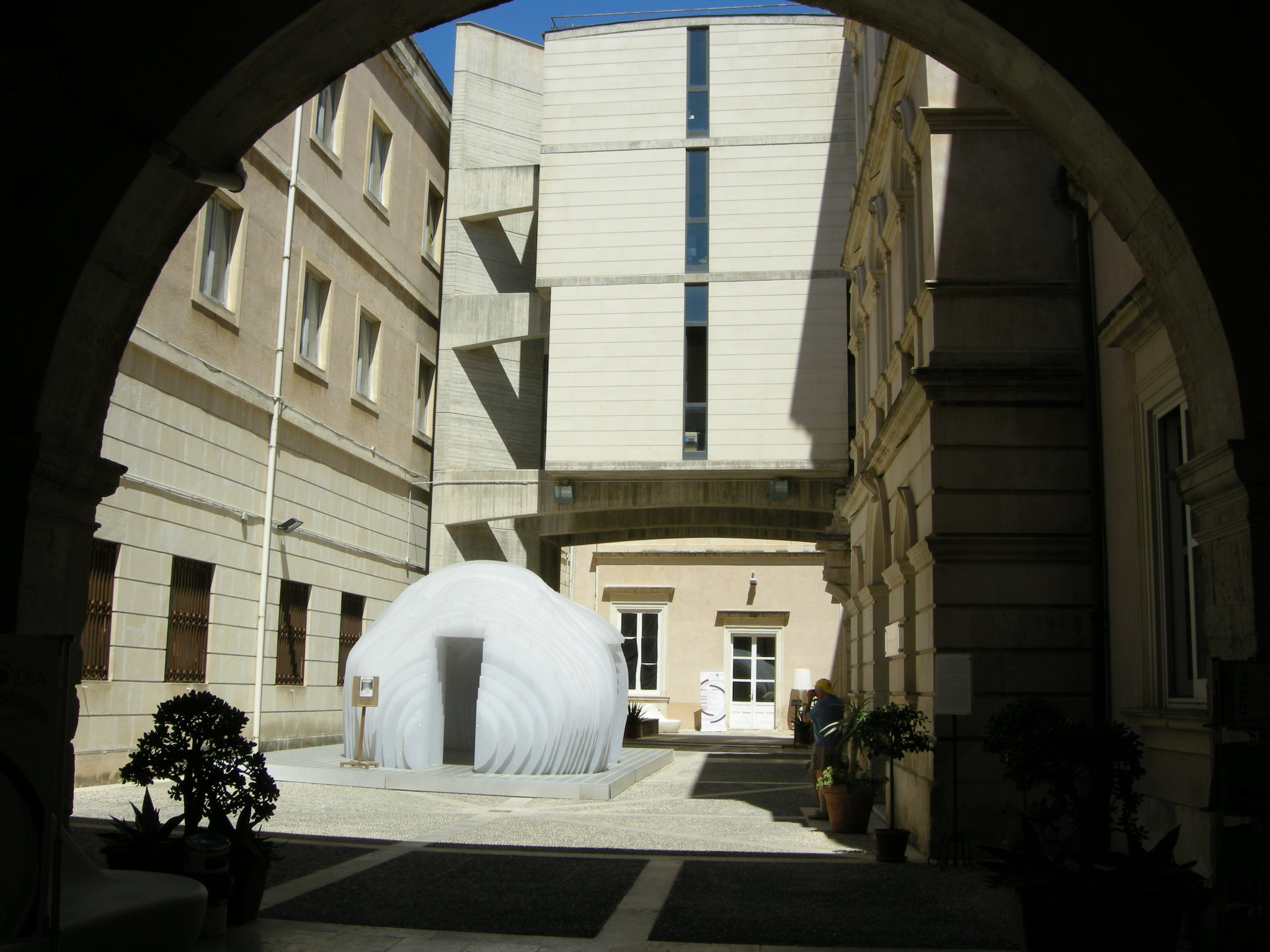
- Santa Maria della Concezione, the provincial seat

- Flag Coat of arms

- Location of the province of Syracuse in Italy
- Country: Italy
- Region: Sicily
- Capital(s): Syracuse
- Municipalities: 21

Government
  - President: Michelangelo Giansiracusa (Az)

Area
  - Total: 2,124.13 km^{2} (820.13 sq mi)

Population (2026)
  - Total: 382,450
  - Density: 180.05/km^{2} (466.33/sq mi)

GDP
  - Total: €11.300 billion (2022)
  - Per capita: €29,300 (2022)
- Time zone: UTC+1 (CET)
  - Summer (DST): UTC+2 (CEST)
- Postal code: 96100, 96010-96019
- Telephone prefix: 0931, 095
- Vehicle registration: SR
- ISTAT code: 089
- Website: www.provincia.siracusa.it

The province of Syracuse (Italian: provincia di Siracusa; Sicilian: pruvincia di Saragusa) was a province in the autonomous island region of Sicily in Italy. Its capital was the city of Syracuse, a town established by Greek colonists arriving from Corinth in the 8th century BC.

The former province has a population of 382,450 in an area of 2,124.13 square kilometres (820.13 mi^{2}) across its 21 municipalities.

Following the suppression of the Sicilian provinces, it was replaced in August 2015 by the free municipal consortium of Syracuse (Italian: libero consorzio comunale di Siracusa).

== Geography ==
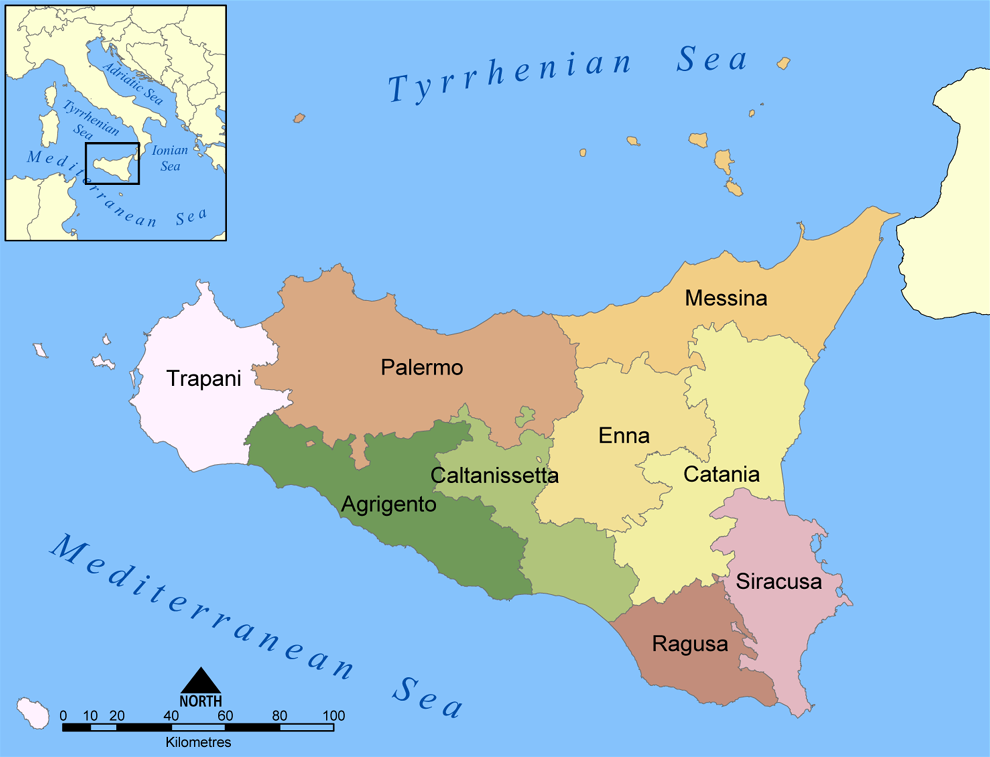

The province of Syracuse lies in the southeastern Sicily, in southwestern Italy. It is bordered to the north and north-west by the province of Catania to the west by the province of Ragusa, and to the east and south by the Ionian and Mediterranean seas. It occupies an area of 2,109 square kilometres (814 sq mi). In 2002, ancient centres of Noto, Palazzolo Acreide and six other towns in the Noto Valley, were awarded UNESCO World Heritage Site status, and is a significant attraction due to its historical, architectural, artistic and archaeological interest. The towns are particularly dense with late Baroque architecture, dates to the immense rebuilding of the towns which took place after the 1693 earthquake which devastated Sicily. The Park of Neapolis on the island of Ortygia is connected by three bridges to the mainland. The island contains the Castello Maniace, dated to the Hohenstaufen period and the Doric Temple of Athena, which was renovated by the Normans.

The Hyblaean Mountains are the dominant mountain range in the province, sloping down to a coastline which contains stretches of white sandy beaches, cliffs, bays, and islets. The coast to the south of Syracuse contains numerous protected areas, such as the Area Marina Protetta del Plemmirio, the Riserva Naturale Orientara Cavagrande between Cassibile and Avola, and the Riserva Naturale Orientata faunistica di Vendicar, north of Pachino. Within the province lies Lago di Lentini, the largest lake in Sicily, and reputedly the largest artificial lake in Europe, which supports a marshland habitat with over 150 different species.

Modern Flag, adopted in 2015

=== Municipalities ===
The province has 21 municipalities:

- Augusta
- Avola
- Buccheri
- Buscemi
- Canicattini Bagni
- Carlentini
- Cassaro
- Ferla
- Floridia
- Francofonte
- Lentini
- Melilli
- Noto
- Pachino
- Palazzolo Acreide
- Rosolini
- Syracuse
- Solarino
- Sortino
- Portopalo di Capo Passero
- Priolo Gargallo

== Demographics ==
As of 2026, the population is 382,450, of which 49.5% are male, and 50.5% are female. Minors make up 15.2% of the population, and seniors make up 24.2%.

Historical population

Year	Pop.	±%
1861	134,991	—
1871	147,796	+9.5%
1881	167,341	+13.2%
1901	217,414	+29.9%
1911	256,053	+17.8%
1921	291,526	+13.9%
1931	279,774	−4.0%
1936	273,593	−2.2%

Year	Pop.	±%
1951	318,842	+16.5%
1961	345,777	+8.4%
1971	365,039	+5.6%
1981	394,692	+8.1%
1991	402,014	+1.9%
2001	396,167	−1.5%
2011	399,933	+1.0%
2021	385,900	−3.5%

Source: ISTAT

=== Immigration ===
As of 2025, immigrants make up 7.1% of the population. The 5 largest foreign countries of birth are Germany, Romania, Morocco, Tunisia, and Argentina.
