= List of colossal sculptures in situ =

Large sculptures carved into a material that remain at location

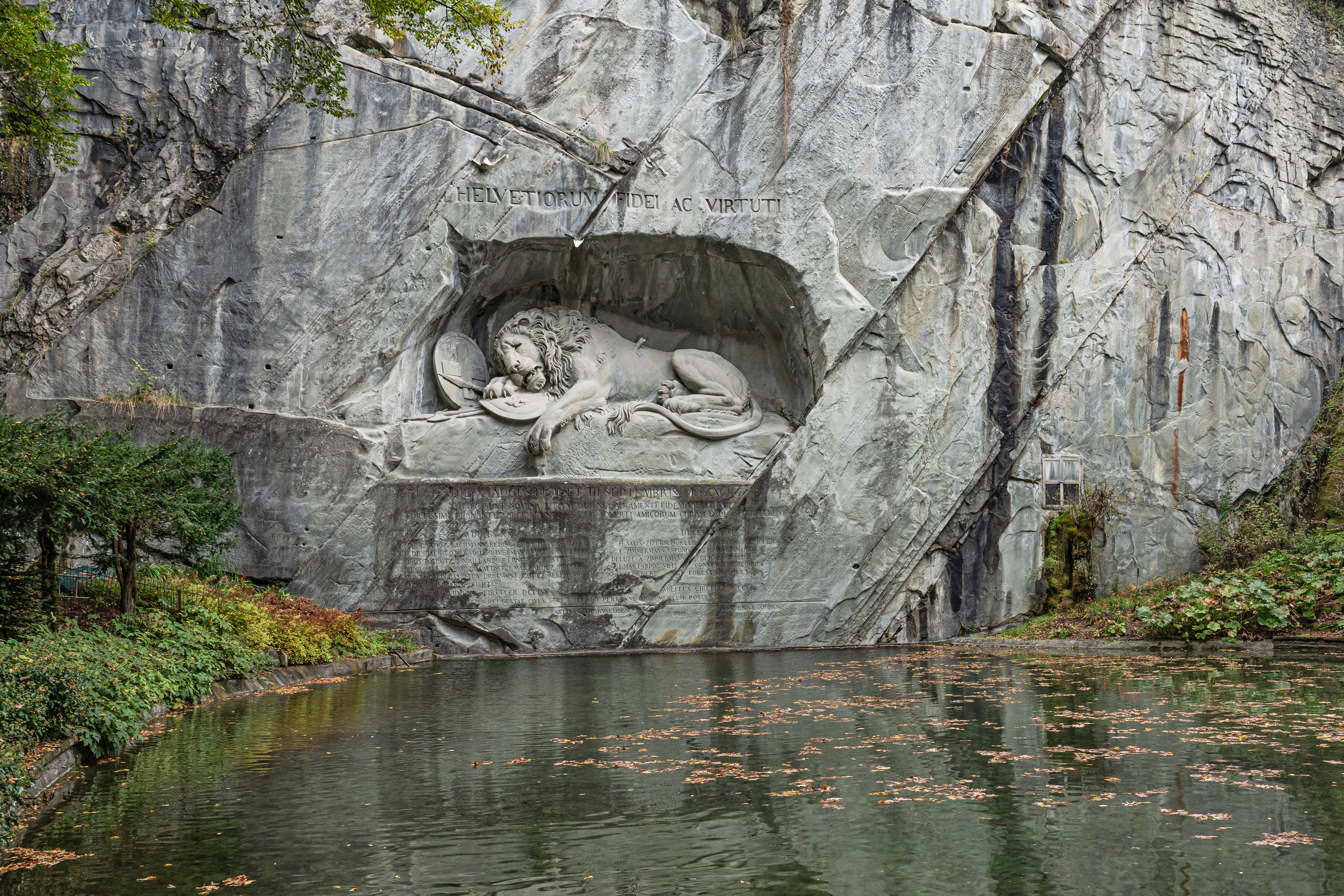
The Lion Monument, an in situ sculpture in Lucerne, Switzerland

A colossal statue is one that is more than twice life-size. This is a list of colossal statues and other sculptures that were created, mostly or all carved, and remain in situ. This list includes two colossal stones that were intended to be moved. However, they were never broken free of the quarry in which they were carved, and therefore they would be considered carved in situ. Most of these were carved in ancient times.

In many cases, especially in India, these sculptures were carved out of softer rocks like sandstone or volcanic tuff. However, in some cases they were carved out of harder rocks like basalt, or even granite in the case of the unfinished obelisk in Egypt. The Egyptians may have been limited to using 4.5-kilogram (10-pound) dolerite balls to chip away at the granite. Dynamite was used in the carving of Mount Rushmore's Shrine of Democracy, one of the few colossal sculptures that was carved out of granite.

== Africa ==
=== Egypt ===
- Great Sphinx of Giza – limestone
- Abu Simbel temples – sandstone
- The unfinished obelisk at Aswan – granite
- Seti I – limestone

=== Ethiopia ===
- Lalibela – tuff
  - Church of Saint George, Lalibela – tuff

== Asia ==
=== Afghanistan ===
- Buddhas of Bamiyan, destroyed in 2001 by the Taliban

=== China ===
- Bingling Temple
- Leshan Giant Buddha
- Mengshan Giant Buddha
- Renshou Giant Buddha
- Rongxian Giant Buddha

=== India ===
- Ajanta Caves
- Badami Cave Temples
- Barabar Caves
- Cave temples
- Elephanta Caves
- Ellora Caves
- Gommateshwara statue
- Gopachal rock-cut Jain monuments
- Kailashnath Temple, Ellora
- Kanheri Caves
- Mahabalipuram
- Vijayanagara

=== Iran ===
- Behistun
- Naqsh-e Rostam
- Taq-e Bostan
- Colossal Statue of Shapur I, Shapur cave

=== Jordan ===
- Petra

=== Lebanon ===
- The stone of the south

=== Saudi Arabia ===
- Mada'in Saleh

=== Sri Lanka ===
- Avukana Buddha statue
- Gal Vihara
- Sigiriya

=== Turkey ===
- Cappadocia
- Tombs of the kings of Pontus
- Rock tombs
- Mount Nemrut

== Americas ==
=== Colombia ===
- Salt Cathedral of Zipaquirá, Cundinamarca

=== Ecuador ===
- El poder brutal, Quito

=== Peru ===
- Chachapoya cliff tombs at Revash
- Chavín de Huantar's Old Temple

=== United States ===
- Mount Rushmore, South Dakota – granite
- Crazy Horse Memorial, South Dakota – pegmatite granite (work in progress)
- Stone Mountain, Georgia – granite

== Europe ==
=== Armenia ===
- Geghard Monastery

=== Bulgaria ===
- Madara Rider

=== Czech Republic ===
- Čertovy hlavy

=== Greece ===
- Lion of Bavaria, Nafplio

=== Italy ===
- Pantalica, Sicily
- Santoni, Sicily
- Sassi di Matera, Basilicata
- Il Gigante, Monterosso al Mare

=== Poland ===
- Wieliczka Salt Mine

=== Romania ===
- Rock sculpture of Decebalus

=== Switzerland ===
- Lion Monument

== See also ==
- Rock-cut architecture
- Indian rock-cut architecture
- List of statues; by height; in U.S.
- List of Roman domes
- List of tallest statues
- New 7 Wonders of the World
