= Gabriele Judica =

Italian archeologist (1760–1835)

Gabriele Iudica Danieli
- Baron of Baulì
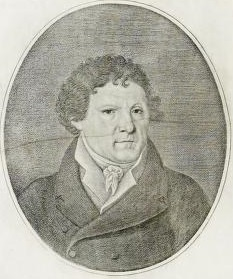
- Predecessor: Michele Iudica Deodato
- Born: August 9, 1760; Palazzolo Acreide, Kingdom of Sicily
- Died: May 3, 1835; Palazzolo Acreide, Kingdom of the Two Sicilies
- Buried: Chiesa Madre di S. Nicolò, Palazzolo Acreide
- Noble family: Iudica
- Spouse: Marianna Bartoli
- Heir: Cesare Iudica
- Father: Michele Iudica Deodato
- Mother: Carmela Danieli
- Occupation: Archaeologist, patron

Gabriele Iudica (or Judica) (Palazzolo Acreide, 9 August 1760 – Palazzolo Acreide, 3 May 1835) was an Italian archaeologist, nobleman, and patron. He is best known for his excavations at the ancient site of Akrai (Akrai/Acrae), and for his pioneering role in the archaeological exploration of southeastern Sicily.

== Life ==
He was born to Don Michele Iudica and Carmela Danieli and inherited the baronial title of Baulì in 1797 upon his father's death. After obtaining a degree in utroque iure (both civil and canon law), he served as a civil judge. He took part in the political life of his town and served for several years as a municipal decurion. In 1821, he was a member of the Commission of Sicilians at the Parliament of Naples and was also a provincial deputy. However, his political involvement was never intense, as he was more interested in family matters and his passion for archaeology, likely inspired by contacts with foreign travelers such as Jean-Pierre Houël.

Iudica began his excavations, which led to the discovery of the ancient city of Akrai near Palazzolo, in 1809, initially without royal authorization. He did inform the royal Custodian of Antiquities of Noto and Demone, Saverio Landolina. The latter's successor opposed Iudica's initiative, prompting him in 1811 to request official authorization, which was granted in August 1811. The excavations resumed in 1813, and Iudica was appointed royal custodian of antiquities for the district of Noto on 1 September 1815. In 1817 he was commissioned to oversee excavations in the territories of Caltagirone and Modica.

In 1819, he began the publication of his book Le antichità di Acre ("The Antiquities of Akrai"), providing a detailed account of his archaeological finds with engraved plates by Giuseppe Politi. The work was effectively published in 1821. In 1820, he identified what he believed to be an Odeon, later reclassified by scholars as a Bouleuterion.

In 1824, in a letter published in the journal Giornale di scienze, lettere ed arti per la Sicilia, he announced the discovery of the Theatre of Akrai.
The Akrai excavations were financed entirely at his own expense on land he had purchased, and he established a museum in his palace to house all the archaeological finds he had discovered. By 1828, he was considered the wealthiest man in Palazzolo, with an annual declared income of 1,536 onze (Sicilian currency). However, a series of legal disputes over his excavation permits and significant lawsuits over debts (notably with the Abbey of Santa Maria dell’Arco concerning feudal dues) began to trouble his later years. These lawsuits continued after his death in 1835, prompting his adoptive son Cesare to request that the Royal Demesne purchase Iudica’s archaeological collection.

A document dated 1859 in the archives of the Church of San Sebastiano records that he was buried at the Chiesa Madre of Palazzolo.

== Works ==
- Gabriele Judica (1819). Le antichità di Acre scoperte, descritte ed illustrate. Messina: G. Pappalardo.
