= Rongxian Giant Buddha =

8th-century statue in Sichuan, China

Coordinates: 29°27′17″N 104°25′52″E

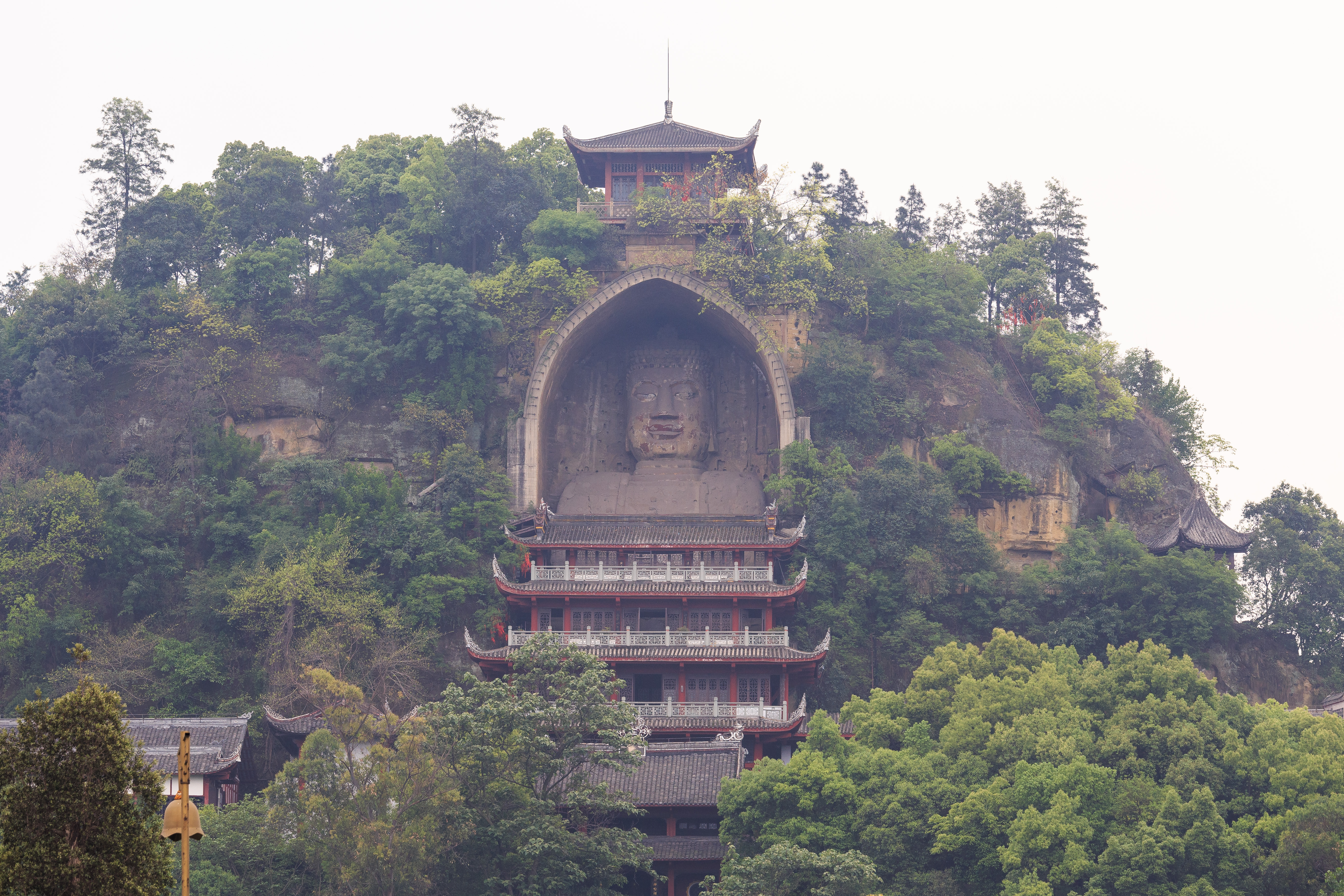
The statue seen from below in 2014

The Rongxian Giant Buddha (simplified Chinese: 荣县大佛; traditional Chinese: 榮縣大佛; pinyin: Róngxìan Dàfó) formerly romanized as Yong-hien or Hong-yien, is a 36.7-metre (120 ft) tall stone statue, built around 817 (during the Tang dynasty), depicting Shakyamuni. It is 90 kilometres east of the Leshan Giant Buddha. The Buddha is carved out of the cliff face of a stone hill that lies to the north east of Rongxian and the Rongxi River in the eastern part of Sichuan province in China. Standing 414 metres above sea level, the stone sculpture overlooks the town of Rongxian below its feet. After the Leshan Giant Buddha, it is the second tallest pre-modern statue. The Temple is located on the Dafo Road, Rongxian, Zigong Shi, Sichuan Sheng, China. Dàfó (大佛) in Chinese means Big Buddha. The nearest city is Zigong.

== History ==
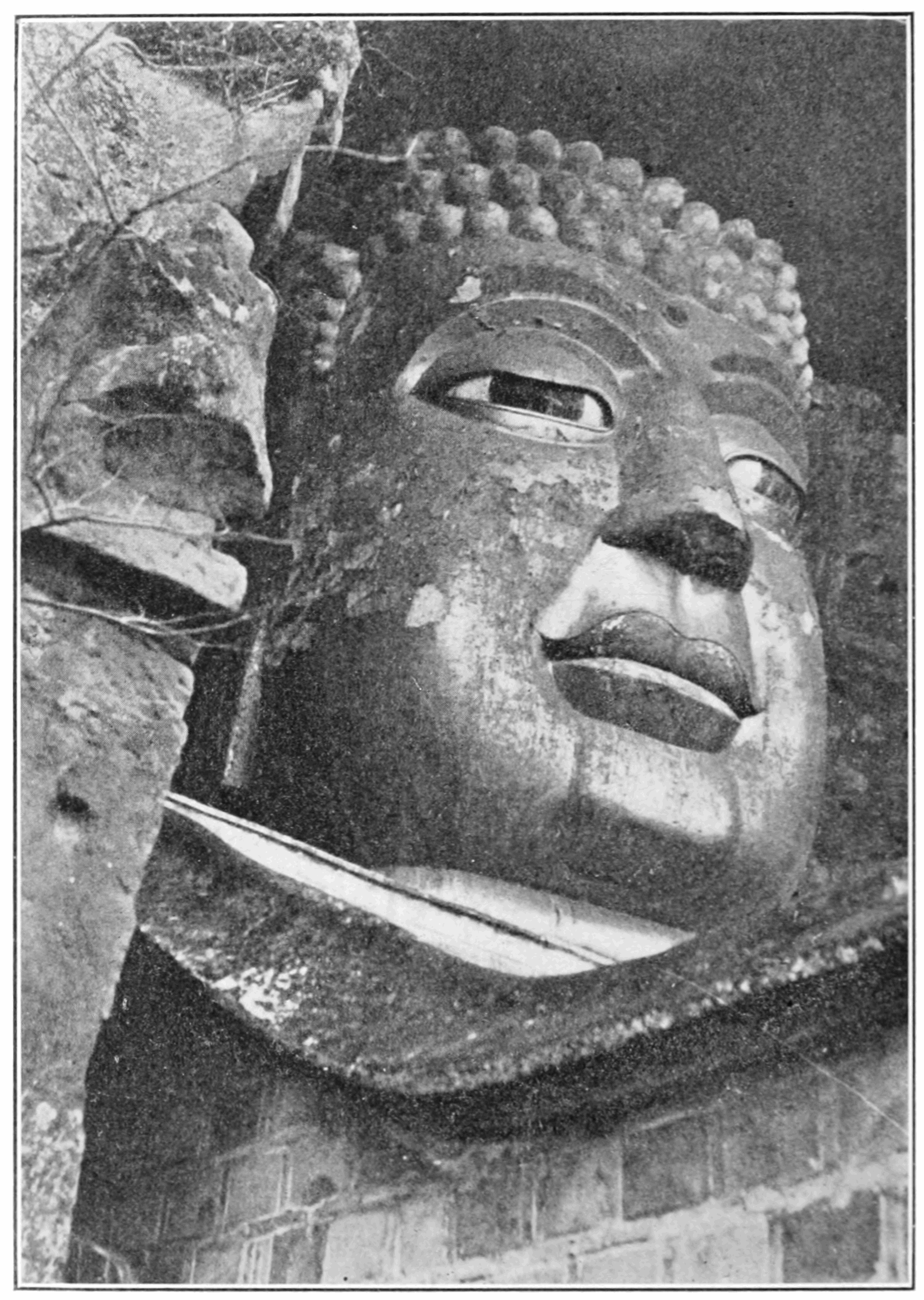
Rongxian Giant Buddha in 1910

Construction was started in around 817, by Chinese monks.

A sophisticated drainage system was incorporated into the Rongxian Giant Buddha when it was built, still in working order; it includes drainage pipes carved into various places on the body, to carry away the water after the rains so as to reduce weathering.

When the Giant Buddha was carved, a huge ten story wood structure, with five roofs was built to shelter it from the rain and sun. Unusually this structure is still in place.

The statue had been known about by westerners from as far back as the late 1870s when Edward Colborne Baber (a British traveller visiting Jah-ding and Mount Omei (Leshan)) had been told of its existence by an unknown Russian traveller. However it was not until 1910 that Roger Sprague (an American University Graduate) visited it. He found the figure to be on the same plan as the Buddha at Leshan. The upper half of the hill was sandstone cliff into which a niche 50 feet broad had been cut, "leaving a central core of stone carved into a figure seated in European style, not cross legged as Buddha is so often represented. There he sits, grimly gazing out at the tiled roof of the city which lies before him". Sprague was also to see a Temple in Yong-hien, the city below the Great Buddha, where he noticed two chimneys which disproved the theory that "in China proper chimneys are unknown".

== Degradation ==
The Rongxian Buddha has been affected by the pollution emanating from the unbridled development in the region. According to Xinhua news agency, the Leshan Giant Buddha and many Chinese natural and cultural heritage sites in the region have seen degradations from weathering, air pollution, and swarms of tourists. The government has promised restoration work.

== Dimensions ==
At 71 metres (233 ft) tall, the statue depicts a seated Maitreya Buddha with his hands resting on his knees. His body is 36.67 metres high, the head 8.76 metres, his shoulders 12.67 metres wide, the knees 12 metres high, and the feet 3.5 metres wide.

There is a local saying: "The mountain is a Buddha and the Buddha is a mountain".

The Temple covers an area of about 80,000 square metres, the temple and housing enclosing the Buddha is an area of 2000 square metres.

== Gallery ==
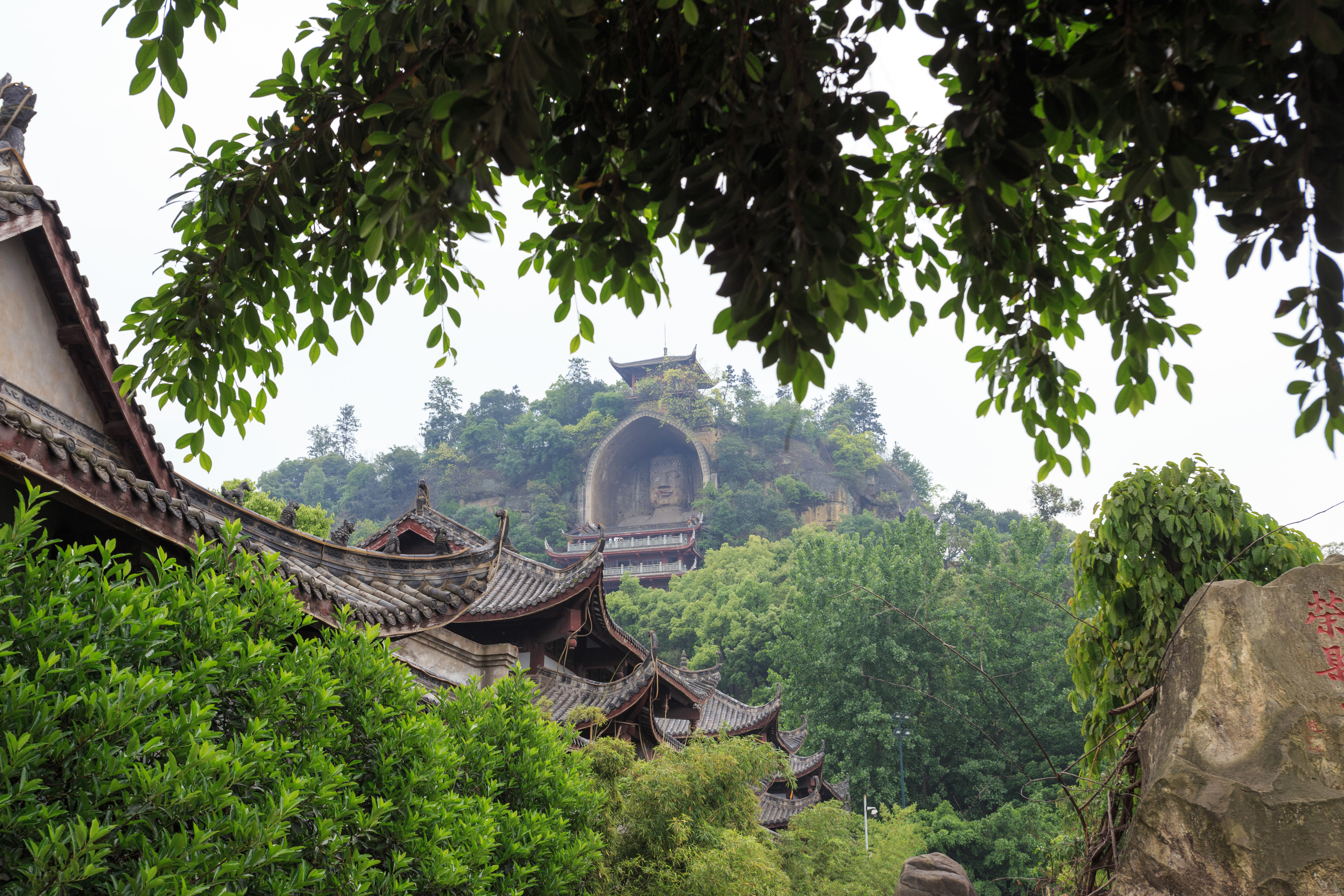
The Buddha in 2014

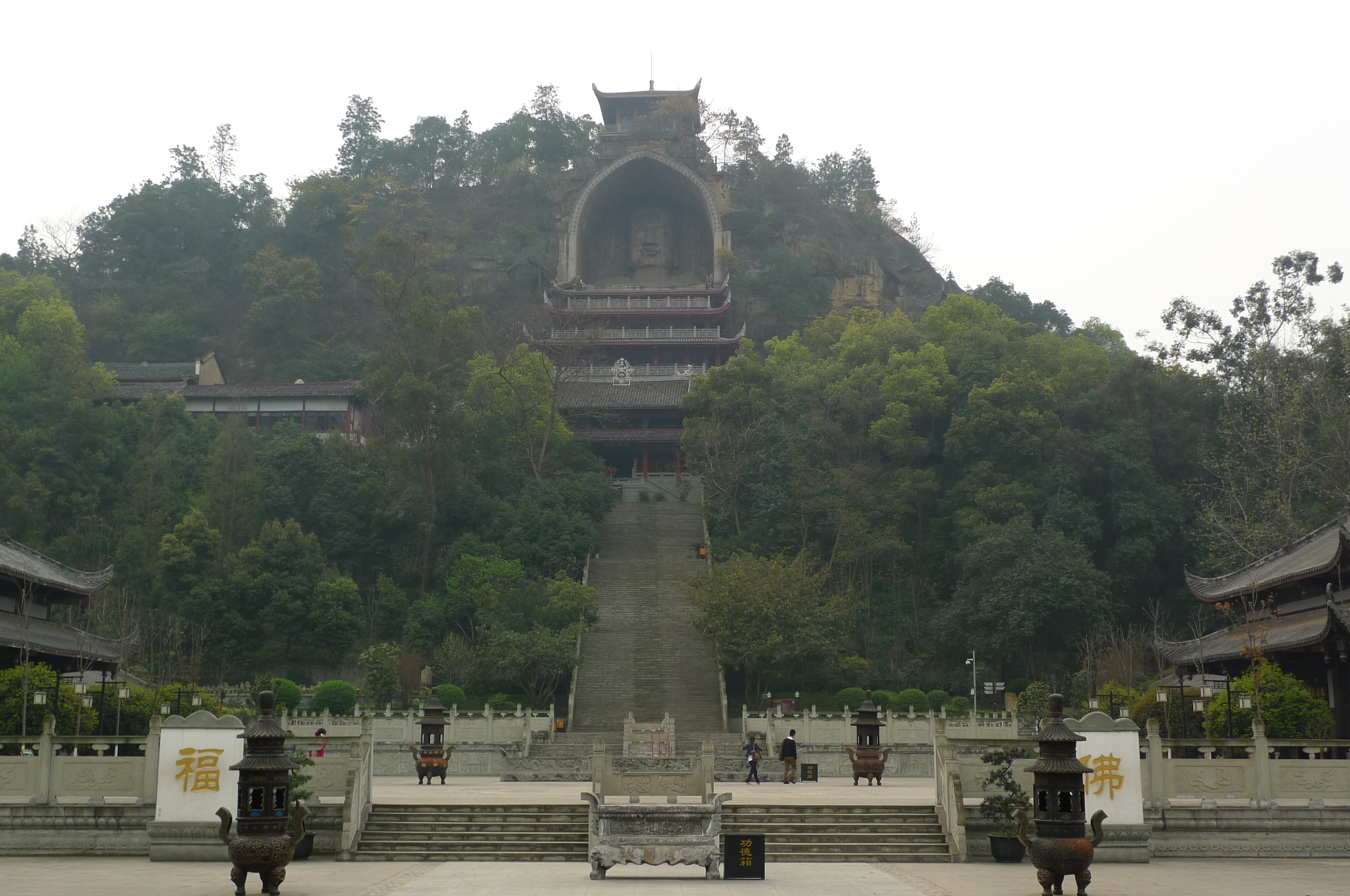
The Buddha in 2012

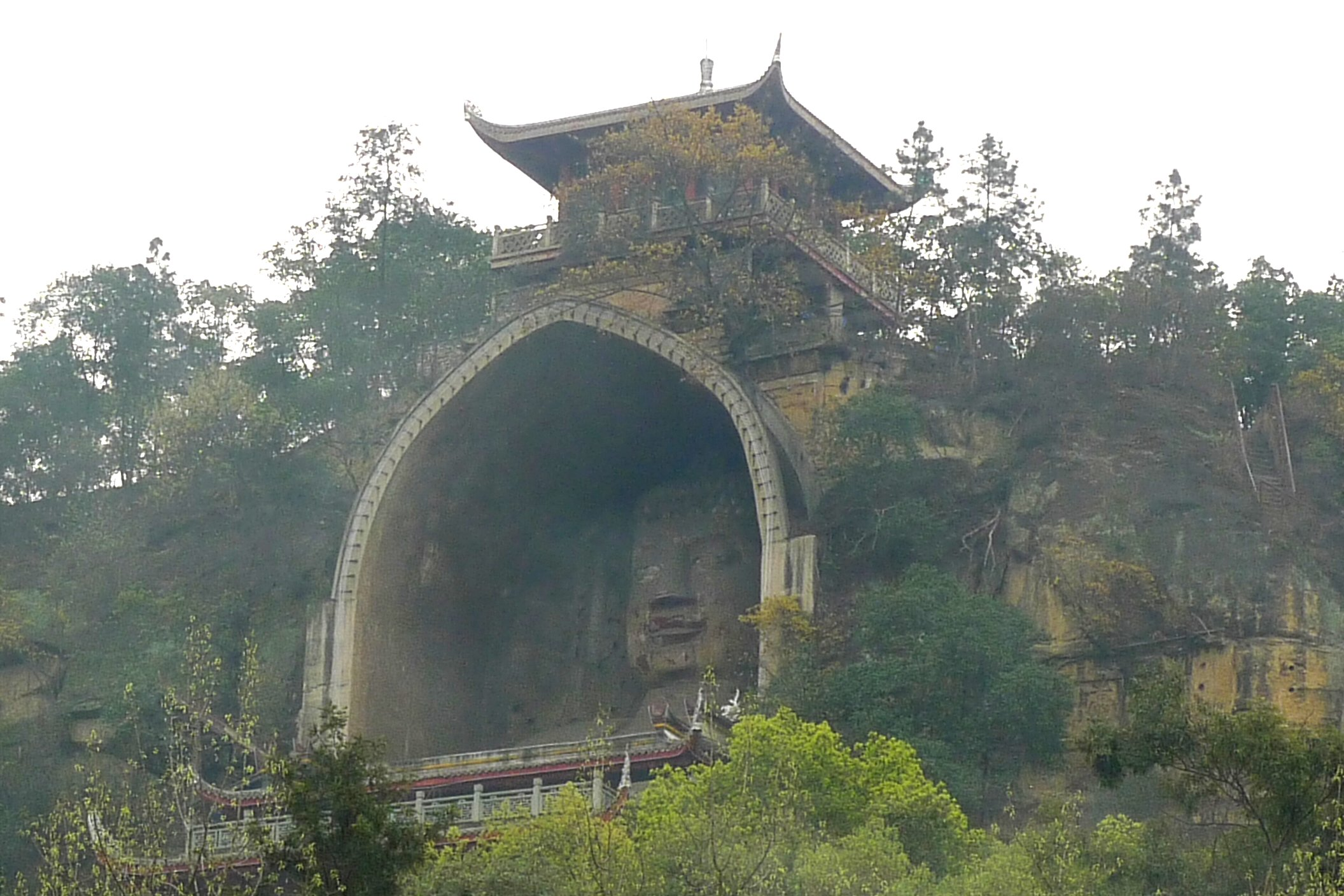
The Buddha in 2012

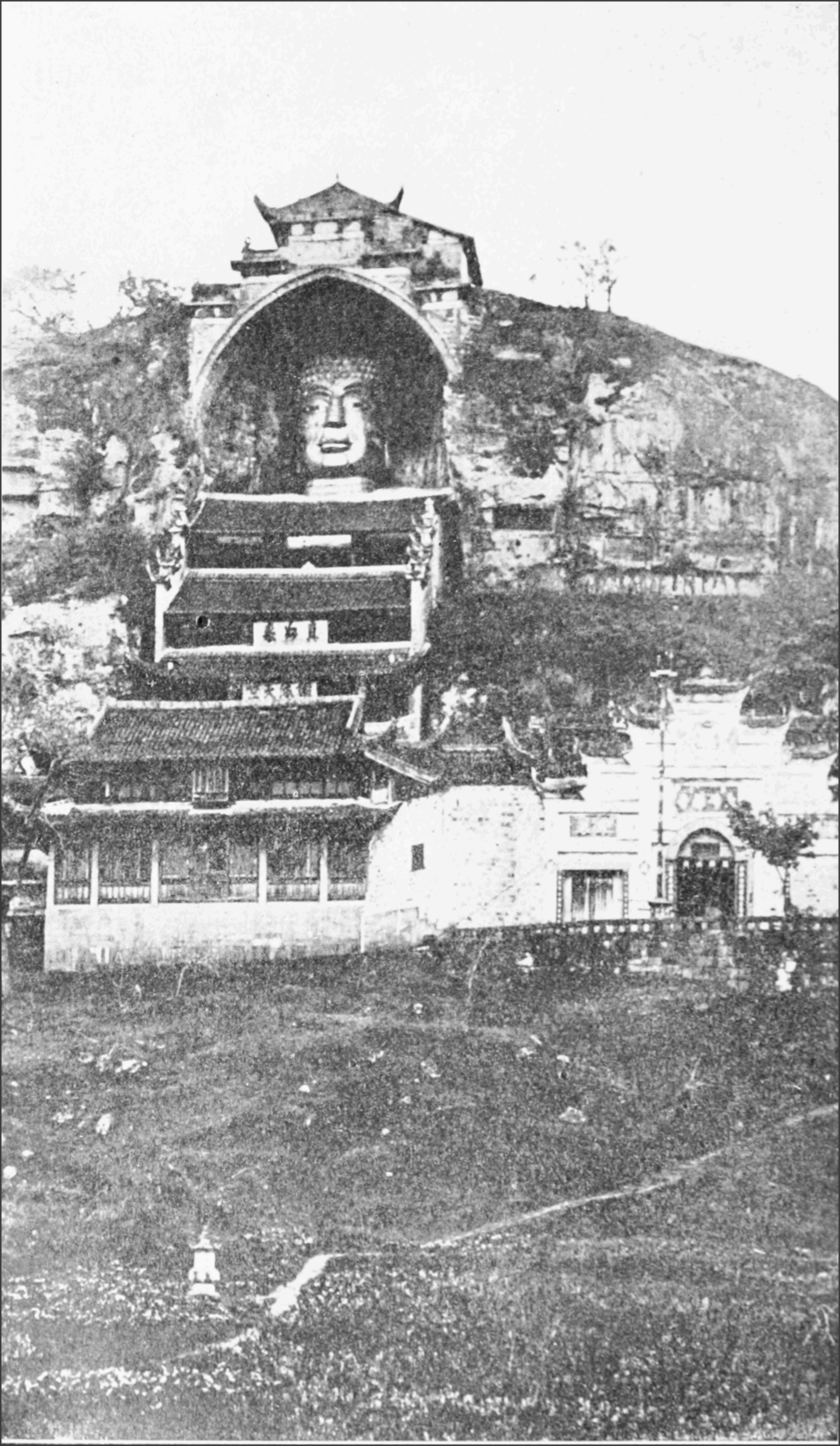
The Buddha in 1910

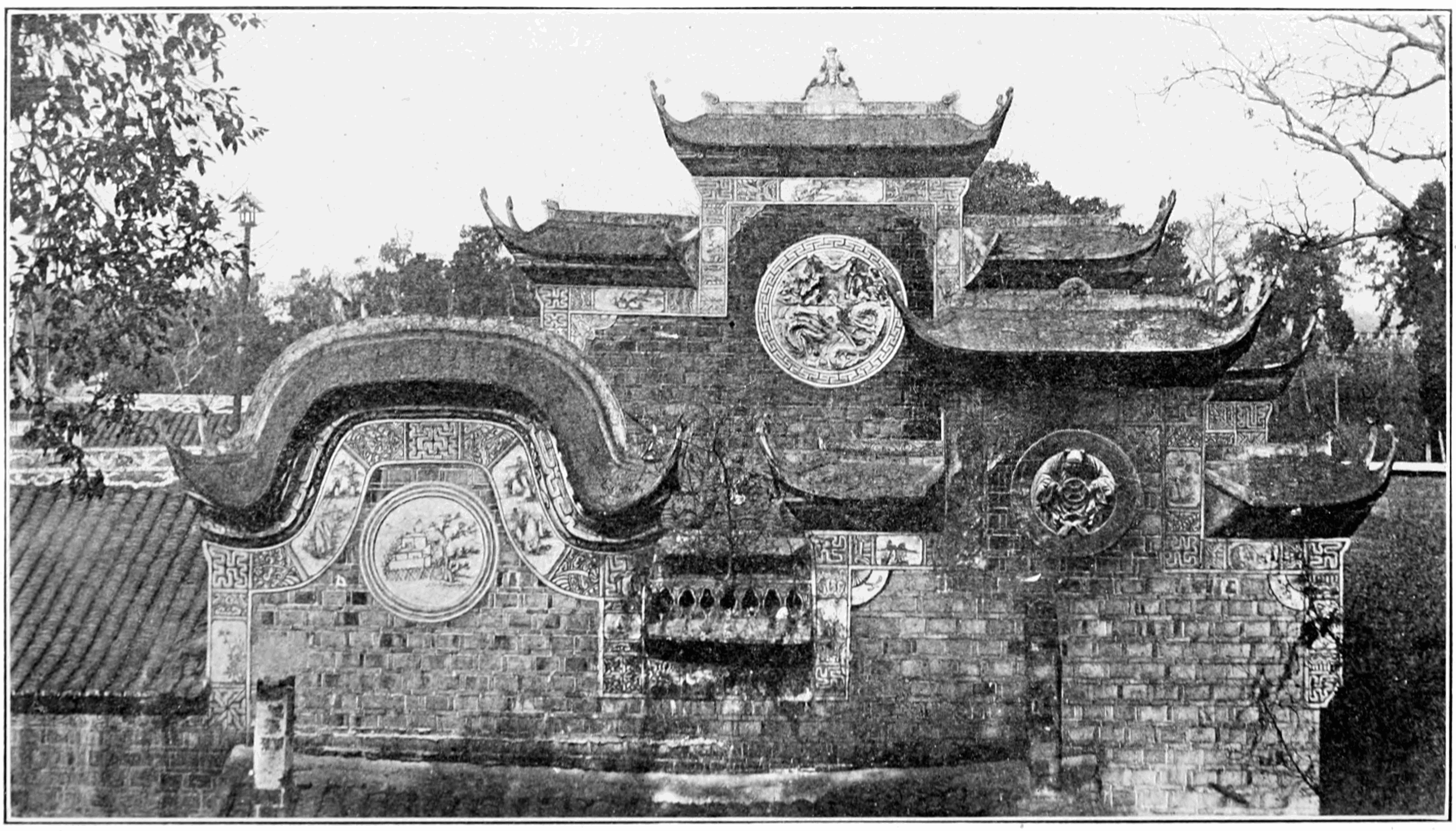
A Temple in Yong-hien, the city below the Great Buddha in 1910. Notice the two chimneys in the foreground.

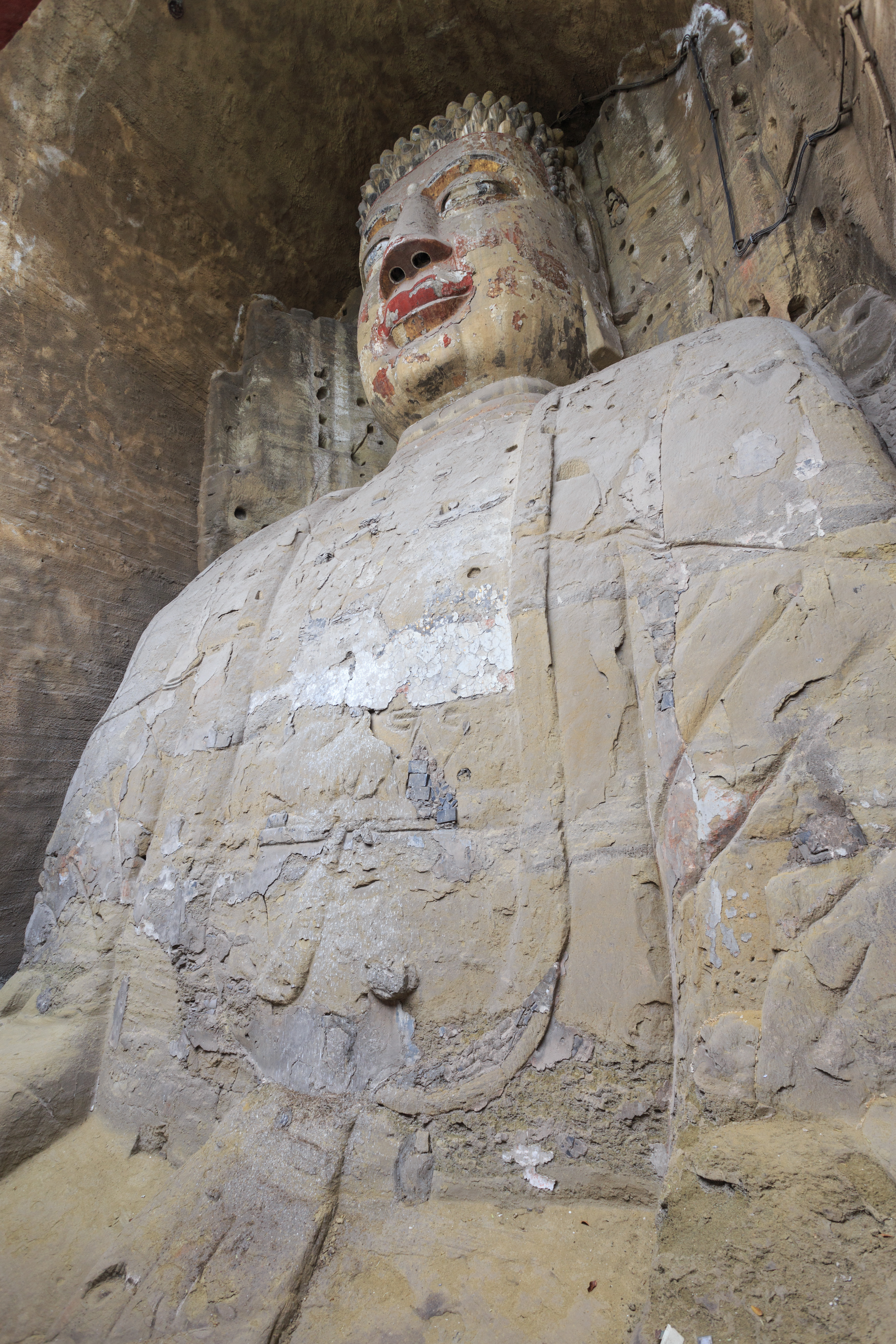
The Buddha in 2014

== See also ==
- Buddhist art
- Chinese Buddhism
- Renshou Giant Buddha
- List of tallest statues
- List of colossal sculpture in situ
