= El poder brutal =

Colossal sculpture located in Ecuador

Coordinates: 0°23′54″S 78°48′34″W

El poder brutal ("Brutal Power"), also known as La cara del diablo ("The Face of the Devil") or El diablo de Tandapi ("The devil of Tandapi"), is a colossal sculpture located in Mejía Canton, Pichincha Province, Ecuador. It is an example of rock-cut architecture cut into a mountain on Ecuador Highway 20, about 5 kilometers from the town of Tandapi. It is famous for its size and because it is located on the most traveled route between Quito and Guayaquil.

The figure is located 30 meters above the ground. It is 20 meters high and protrudes from the side of a hill around which the road curves. The massive face has a pair of horns on its forehead; a pointed nose; and a mouth which is half-open to reveal small fangs. On the pedestal below the face, in capital letters, is carved the phrase "EL PODER BRUTAL."

== History ==
El poder brutal was sculpted in the 1970’s by César Octaviano Cristóbal Buenaño Núñez, a tractor driver employed by the Ecuadorean Ministry of Public Works. Buenaño was born in Ambato and lived in Santo Domingo de los Colorados. He died of leukemia in 2001. Although he had only a primary-school education and lacked formal artistic training, he was an autodidact and managed to gather several million sucres in order to sculpt "El poder brutal" over the course of more than a year. Before he commenced on the sculpture, only his family and close friends were aware of his artistic tendencies.

The Ministry of Public Works tasked Buenaño with the demolition of a rocky hill along a curve of the Alóag–Santo Domingo road, at approximately the 50-km marker. This rock was blocking the view of drivers and causing accidents along the road. Buenaño began his work with a Payloader tractor. In this work he uncovered a gigantic solid rock, which he decided to sculpt.

First, he sketched the sculpture. In addition to this design work, the sculptor made his own tools, such as chisels, combos, hammers, and a system of pulleys to navigate the surface of the rock while he carved it. Bueñano worked the mountain with his tractor between 6 AM and 3 PM every day; from 3 PM to 9 PM he worked on the sculpture. He angled his tractor work with great care so that the colossal sculpture would not be visible from the road until it was finished. Finally, the Ministry demanded that Buenaño finish the demolition; the final dynamite blast revealed the sculpture to view.

Bueñano commented during the construction to his friends that "by sculpting a figure that represented the Devil, the Devil would leave the drivers alone." Referring to a small Catholic shrine 10 km away, he also said, "If the Virgin and the saints have their sculptures, why cannot the Devil have his own?"

== Symbolism ==
Some local legends attribute Buenaño's sculpture to Satanic inspiration. In fact, the sculptor was very religious.

According to his son Luis, Octaviano Buenaño had the motivation to leave a message of wisdom to humanity through sculpture. El poder brutal does not merely represent the Devil by his physical traits; its greater meaning is the brutal power of our interior, the free will of humankind. Physically it represents the rational man and the unconscious man, the sculpture is based on physical traces of man (eyes and nose) and animal (ears and fangs).

== Location ==
El poder brutal is located on the boundary between the coastal "Costa" region of Ecuador and the mountainous "Sierra" region; thus at dusk it is often foggy, and precipitation is frequent and violent. Until the 1990s, the road past the statue was the only road between the Costa and the Sierra; and to this day it remains the most traveled road in the country.

== See also ==
- List of colossal sculptures in situ
