= Akrai =

Ancient Greek colony in Sicily

- Ἄκραι (Ancient Greek)
- Akrae
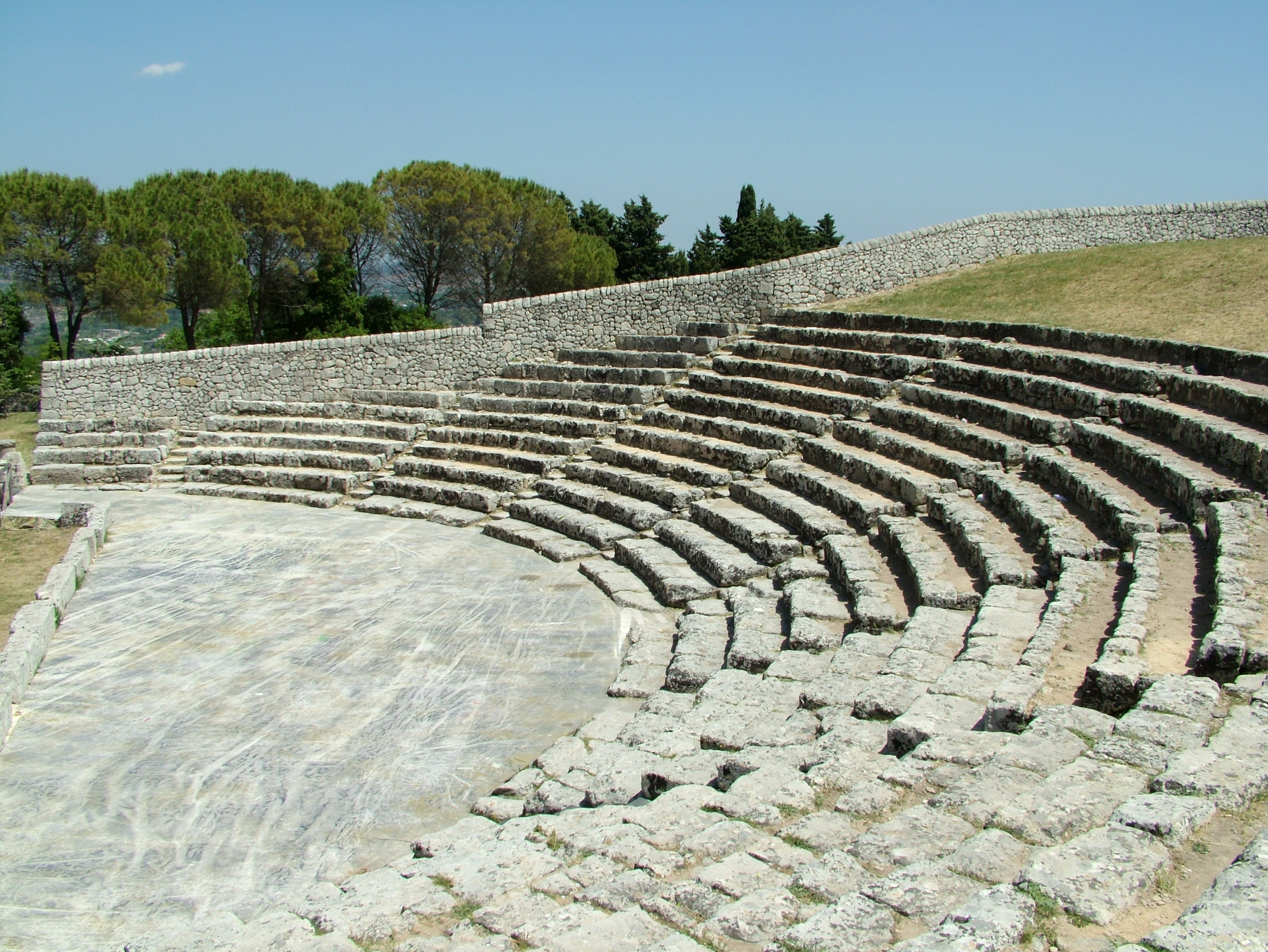
- The Greek theatre

- Location within Italy
- 37°3′28.6″N 14°53′42.21″E
- Type: Settlement
- Periods: Archaic Greek to Byzantine period
- Cultures: Ancient Greece
- Location: Palazzolo Acreide, Italy

History
- Built: 663 BC
- Abandoned: Approximately 827 AD

Akrai (Ancient Greek: Ἄκραι; Latin: Acrenses) was a Greek colony of Magna Graecia founded in Sicily by the Syracusans in 663 BC. It was located near the modern Palazzolo Acreide.

== Location ==
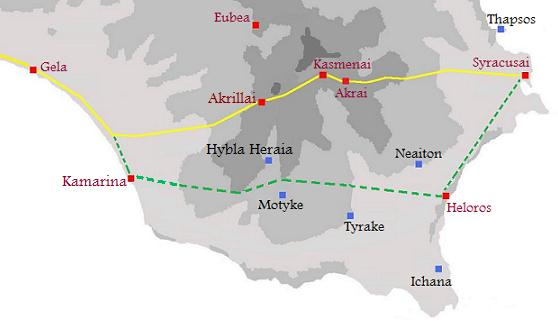
South-east Sicily and the Greek cities in red and the Native settlements in blue. The Via Selinuntina in yellow and the Via Elorina in green.

It was founded on a spectacular and strategic site, on the Acremonte plateau of the Hyblaean Mountains, difficult to attack and with a clear view of the surrounding area, which explains its establishment as a guard post at Syracuse's borders. The top of the hill at 770m is on its south–eastern edge, on which later was placed the acropolis.

== History ==
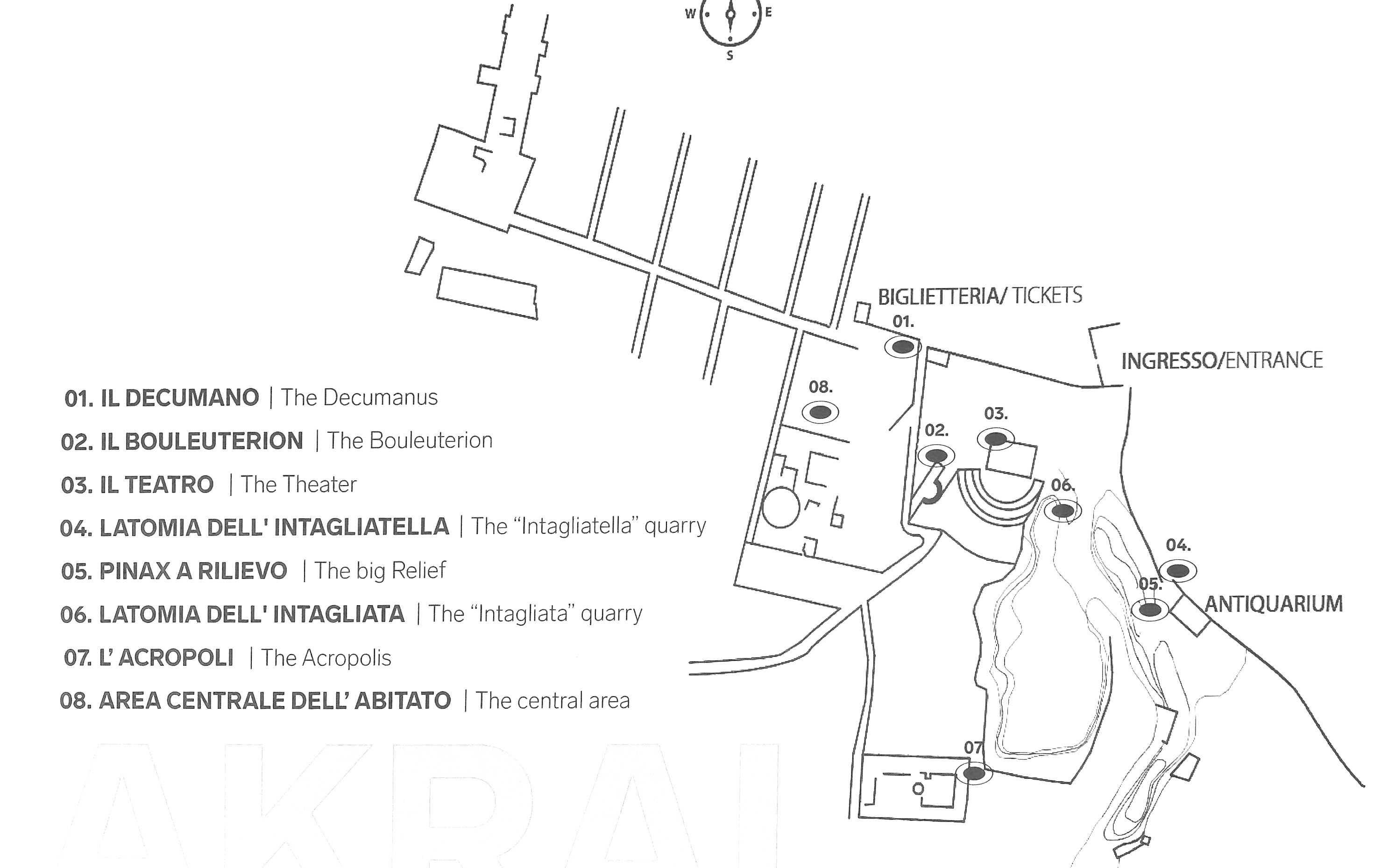
Map of Akrai

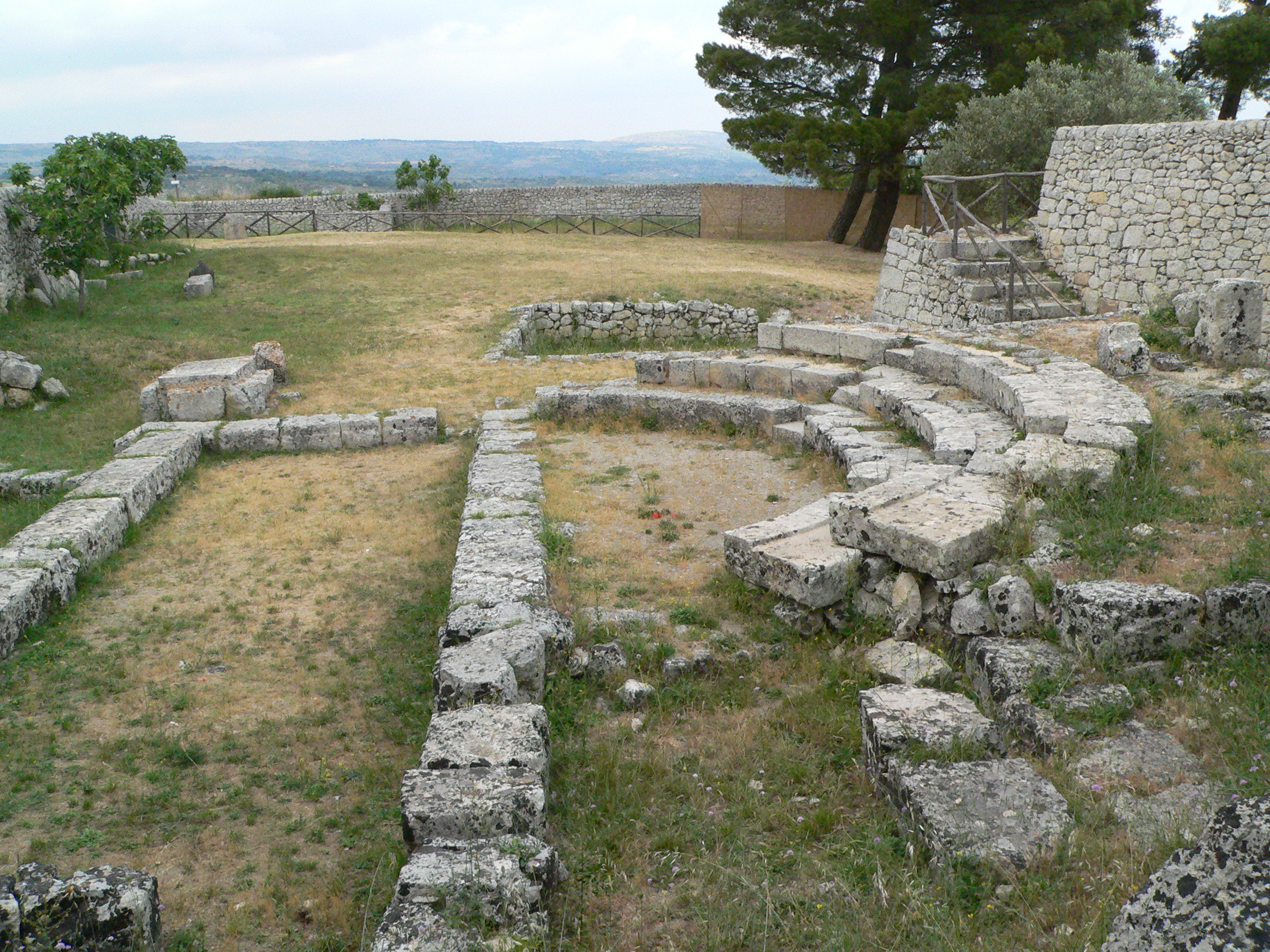
Bouleuterion

Akrai was among the first colonies of Syracuse founded by Corinthian colonists arriving in Sicilian territory in 663 BC. It was on the road to the great city of Gela, along with the Necropolis of Pantalica, Kasmene (military outpost on Monte Lauro), Akrillai and Kamarina (the most distant of the colonies, founded 598 BC). Akrai and Kasmene were founded by the Syracusans: Akrai, seventy years after Syracuse, Kasmenae about twenty years later (c.640 BC). The original colonisation of Kamarina is attributed to the Syracusans, around a hundred and thirty years after the foundation of Syracuse; the founders were called Daskon and Menekolos. Loyal to Syracuse, it nevertheless had its own political life with administrative and military autonomy. Notably, its army intercepted the invasion force of Nicias in the Val di Noto or Anapo in 421 BC, contributing to his defeat.

In the second half of the 6th century BC a temple of Aphrodite was founded indicating Akrai's beginnings of an urban centre.

In 357 BC, Dion of Syracuse, when marching upon Syracuse, halted at Akrai to watch the effect of his proceedings.

Until the 3rd century BC Akrai was a small settlement dominated by Syracuse. The city's development began probably in the mid–3rd century BC after the treaty concluded by the Romans with Hieron II, king of Syracuse (270 - 215 BC), by which Akrai was included in the dominions of that monarch. Buildings erected then included the theatre with the adjacent bouleuterion, architecturally combined with top of theatre auditorium.

During the Second Punic War it followed the fortunes of Syracuse, and afforded a place of refuge to Hippocrates of Syracuse, after his defeat by Marcus Claudius Marcellus at Acrillae, 214 BC. In 211 BC, after the fall of Syracuse, it became part of the Roman province, being known in Latin as Acre. This is the last mention of it in Classical history, and its name is not once noticed by Cicero. It was probably in his time a mere dependency of Syracuse, though it is found in Pliny's list of the "stipendiariae civitates," so that it must then have possessed a separate municipal existence, and is noted by the geographer Ptolemy. The city continued to be under Roman rule into the Byzantine period.

== The Site ==
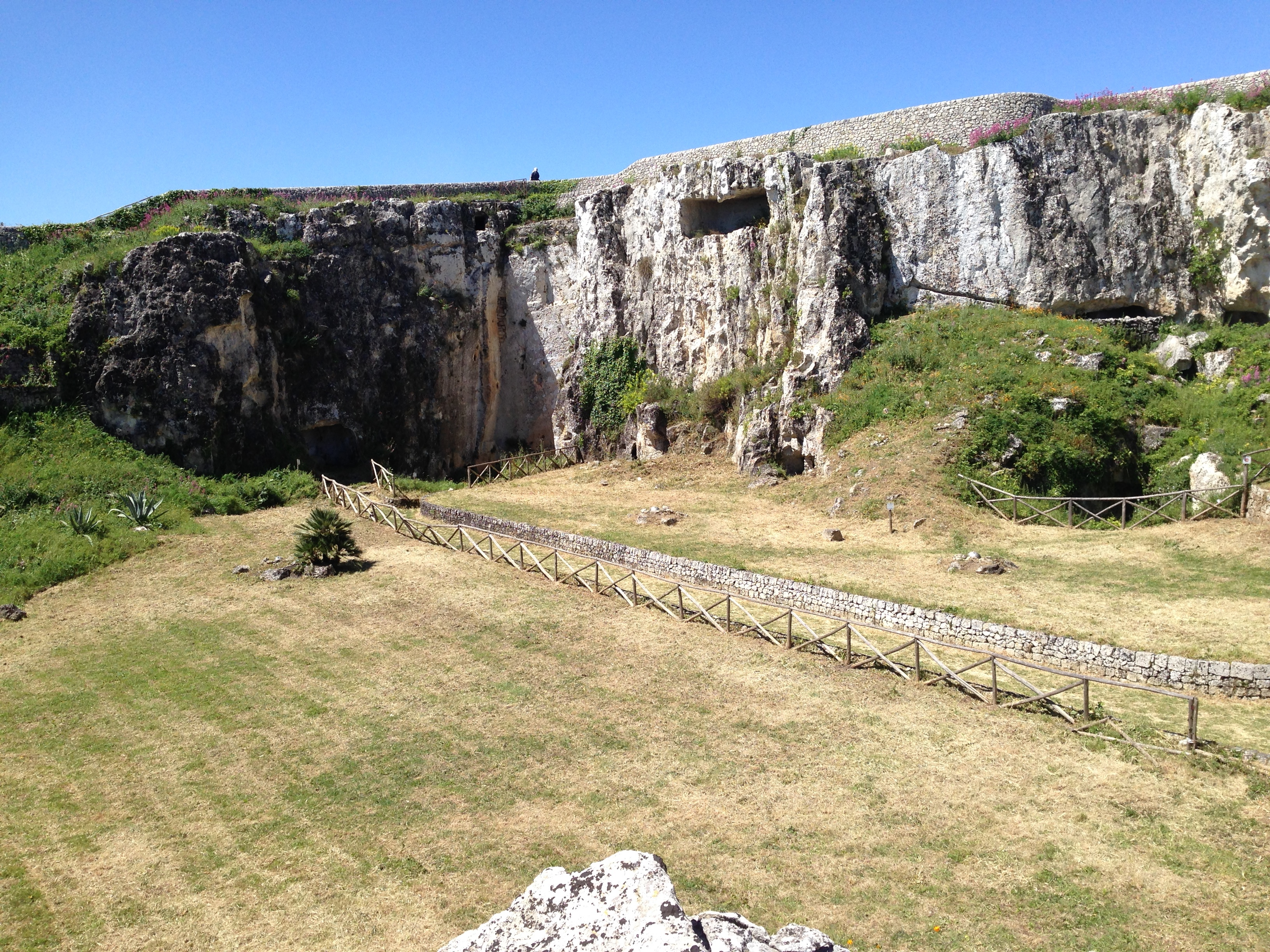
Latomie, ancient quarry used to incarcerate slaves, prisoners of war or delinquents

Excavations have revealed a theatre which is relatively small but very well reconstructed. On the flat area above Intagliata are the foundation stones of the Aphrodision, the temple of Aphrodite, erected in the mid-6th century BC. At the western end of the site is the Bouleuterion, where the city council met. East of the hill are the Feral Temples, dedicated to the cult of the dead.

=== Latomies ===
The Latomies were used both as stone quarries and ancient prisons. There are two latomie in Akrai known as Intagliata and Intagliatella. They were probably excavated as early as the 5th century BC. From the 3rd c. BC they were used for elaborate tomb monuments, and in late antiquity as catacombs and dwellings for the poor.

Syracuse had many latomies of various sizes, and they were clearly used throughout its territory. Following the Athenian expedition to Sicily and the battle between Athens and Syracuse, the latomies were where the defeated Athenian soldiers were imprisoned. Cold in winter and hot in summer, being imprisoned in the latomie was equivalent to a death sentence: they were left to die of hunger and starvation, with no possibility of escape.

Cicero speaks of the latomies:

All of you have heard of, and most of you know directly, the Latomie of Syracuse. A grandiose, magnificent work of kings and tyrants, dug entirely into the rock by many workers, up to an extraordinary depth. Nothing exists and cannot be imagined so closed from all sides and secure against any attempt to escape: if a public place of incarceration is requested, the prisoners are ordered to be brought to these Latomie also from the other cities of Sicily.

== Excavations ==
One of the first scholars to identify the site of the lost city was a Sicilian monk Tommaso Fazello (1498–1570). Subsequently others showed interest in the site, especially baron Gabriele Judica, who undertook the first archaeological excavations at the site in the early 19th century and described his findings in the book Le antichità di Acre (The Antiquities of Akrai), published in 1819. Unearthed monuments were described also by German scholar Julius Schubring. In the 20th century Akrai had been investigated by various scholars including farther-founder of Sicilian archaeology Paolo Orsi (at the beginning of the 20th century), Luigi Bernabò Brea (in the 50s), Giuseppe Voza (in the 70s) and Maria Musumeci with Lorenzo Guzzardi (in the 90s).

Most of the researches that had been undertaken in the 20th century brought into light public architecture. Currently, the image of life in Akrai is being fulfilled by research on the residential part of the city. Greek and Roman houses have been discovered recently by Polish mission from University of Warsaw.

=== Polish mission in Akrai ===
The residential part of the city was recognised during the first season of non-invasive researches in 2009. Between 2010–2017 regular archaeological excavations were carried out. Archaeologists discovered the remains of Greco-Roman houses and numerous artifacts.

== See also ==
- I Santoni
- List of ancient Greek cities

== Literature ==
1. Judica, Gabriele (1819). Le antichità di Acre scoperte, descritte ed illustrate (in Italian). Messina – via G. Pappalardo.
2. Bernabo Brea L., Akrai, Società di Storia Patria per la Sicilia Orientale, Biblioteca III, Monografie Archeologiche della Sicilia, I, Catania 1956;
3. Bernabo Brea L., Il tempio di Afrodite di Akrai, Cahiers du Centre Jean Berard 10, Naples 1986;
4. Campagna L., L'architettura di età ellenistica in Sicilia: per una rilettura del quadro generale, (in:) Sicilia ellenistica, consuetudo italica. Alle origini dell'architettura ellenistica d'Occidente, Osanna-Torelli (ed.), Roma 2006, p. 15-34;
5. Campagna L., Pinzone A., Nuove prospettive di ricerca sulla Sicilia del III sec. a.C. Archeologia, numismatica, storia (Atti Incontro di Studio Messina 2002), Pelorias 11, Messina 2004, p. 151-189;
6. Chowaniec R., Palazzolo Acreide, ancient Acrae, Sicily, Italy in 2009 and 2010, "Światowit", fasc. A. Mediterranean and Non-European Archaeology VIII (XLIX), 2009-2011, p. 169-171;
7. Chowaniec R., Ancient Akrai in the light of new researches. Non-invasive researches in Palazzolo Acreide, south-eastern Sicily, (in:) SOMA 2012 Identity and Connectivity: proceedings of the 16th Symposium on Mediterranean Archaeology, Florence, Italy, 1–3 March 2012, Bombardieri L., D'Agostino A., Guarducci G., Orsi V., Valentini S. (eds.), Oxford 2013, BAR S2581, p. 965-971;
8. Chowaniec R., The recovery in the town? Greek colony in a new Roman reality. Case study, (in:) Centre and Periphery in the Ancient World. Proceeding XVIIIth International Congress of Classical Archaeology, Alvarez J.M., Nogales T., Rodà I. (eds.), vol II, Merida 2014, p. 1007-1011;
9. Chowaniec R., Palazzolo Acreide, Sicily, Italy. Excavations in 2013, "Światowit" fasc. A. Mediterranean and Non-European Archaeology XI (LII), fasc. A. 2013, Warszawa 2014, p. 157-161;
10. Chowaniec R., Palazzolo Acreide, Sicily, Italy. Excavations in 2014, "Światowit" fasc. A. Mediterranean and Non-European Archaeology X (LIII), fasc. A. 2014;
11. Chowaniec R., Corinthian Roman relief bowls from Acrae, prov. Syracuse, south-eastern Sicily, "Światowit" fasc. A. Mediterranean and Non-European Archaeology XII (LIII), 2014, Warszawa 2015, p. 81-98;
12. Chowaniec R. ed., Unveiling the past of an ancient town. Akrai/Acrea in south-eastern Sicily, Warsaw 2015;
13. Chowaniec R., Greek and Roman impact on the environment. Case study: Akrai/Acrae in south-eastern Sicily, (in:) Cracow Landscape Monographs 2. Landscape as impulsion for culture: research, perception & protection. Landscape in the Past & Forgotten Landscape, P. Kołodziejczyk, and B. Kwiatkowska-Kopka (eds.), Cracow 2016, pp. 175–186;
14. Chowaniec R., The Sicilian world after the Punic Wars: the Greek colony in a new reality, (in:) Comparative Perspectives on Past Colonisation, Maritime Interaction and Cultural Integration, H. Glørstad, L. Melheim, Z. Glørstad (eds.), Sheffield 2016, p. 41-54;
15. Chowaniec R., The Coming of Rome. Cultural Landscape of South-Eastern Sicily, Warsaw 2017;
16. Chowaniec R. in collab J. Młynarczyk, T. Więcek, et al., Akrai/Acrae - the Greek Colony and Roman Town. Preliminary Report on the Excavations of the University of Warsaw Archaeological Expedition in 2015, „Archeologia" LXVI 2015, p. 105-130;
17. Chowaniec R., Gręzak A., Dietary preferences of the inhabitants of ancient Akrai/Acrae (south-eastern Sicily) during Roman times and the Byzantine period, (in:) Géoarchéologie des îles de Méditerranée. Geoarchaeology of the Mediterranean Islands, M. Ghilardi (ed.), Paris 2016, p. 287-298;
18. Chowaniec R., Guzzardi L., Palazzolo Acreide, Sicily, Italy. Excavations in 2011, "Światowit" fasc. A. Mediterranean and Non-European Archaeology IX (L), fasc. A. 2011, Warszawa 2012, p. 169-172;
19. Chowaniec R., Guzzardi L., Palazzolo Acreide, Sicily, Italy. Excavations in 2012, "Światowit" fasc. A. Mediterranean and Non-European Archaeology X (LI), fasc. A. 2011, Warszawa 2013, p. 111-115;
20. Chowaniec R., Matera M., New Terracotta Figurine of Demeter/Ceres from the south-eastern Sicily, "Archaeology and Science" 8, 2012, Belgrade 2013, p. 7-18;
21. Chowaniec R., in coll. Misiewicz K., Małkowski W., Acrae antica alla luce di indagini non invasive, "Journal of Ancient Topography (Rivista di Topografia Antica)" XIX, 2009 (2010), p. 121-138;
22. Chowaniec R., Misiewicz K., Non-invasive researches in Palazzolo Acreide (ancient Akrai), Sicily, "Archeologia" 59, 2008 (2010), p. 173-186, pl. XXV-XXVII;
23. Chowaniec R., Rekowska M., Rediscovering the Past. Ancient Akrai in Sicily, (in:) Et in Arcadia Ego. Studia Memoriae Professoris Thomae Mikocki dicata, Dobrowolski W., Płóciennik T. (eds.), Warsaw 2013, p. 261-271;
24. Chowaniec R., Więcek T., Guzzardi L., Akrai greca e Acrae romana. I nuovi rinvenimenti monetali degli scavi polacco-italiani 2011-2012, "Annali Istituto Italiano di Numismatica" 59, 2013 (2014), p. 237-269, tav. XIV-XV;
25. Cracco Ruggini L., La Sicilia fra Roma e Bisanzio, Storia della Sicilia III, Napoli 1980, p. 1-96;
26. Danner P., Akrai, (in:) Lexicon of Greek and Roman Cities 3, p. 426-430;
27. Fischer-Hansen T., The Earliest Town-Planning of the Western Greek Colonies, with special regard to Sicily, (in:) Introduction to an Inventory of Poleis, Symposium August, 23-26 1995, Acts of the Copenhagen Polis Centre 3, Hansen M. H. (ed.), Copenhagen 3, p. 317-407;
28. La Sicilia antica I, 3 Citta greche e indigene di Sicilia. Documenti e storia, Gabba E., Vallet G. (eds.), Napoli 1980;
29. La Sicilia antica. La Sicilia greca dal VI secolo alle guerre puniche, II, 1, Gabba E., Vallet G. (eds.), Napoli 1979;
30. Manni E., Geografia fisica e politica della Sicilia antica, Roma 1981;
31. Mitens K., Teatri greci e teatri ispirati all'architettura greca in Sicilia e nell'Italia meridionale, c. 350-50 a.C.: un catalogo, Roma 1988;
32. Orsi P., Palazzolo Acreide. Resti siculi in contrada Sparano, Notizie degli Scavi di Antichità without no, 1891, p. 355-357;
33. Orsi P., Epigrafe cristiana di Palazzolo Acreide (Acrae). Cotributi alla storia dell'altopiano acrense nell'antichità, "Rivista di Archeologia Cristiana" VIII, 1931, p. 295-296;
34. Pelagatti P., Akrai (Siracusa). Ricerche nel territorio, Atti della Accademia Nazionale dei Lincei CCCLXVII, "Notizie degli Scavi di Antichità" 24, Rome 1970, p. 436-499;
35. Pugliese Carratelli, Palazzolo Acreide. Epigrafi cristiane nella collezione Iudica, Atti della Accademia Nazionale dei Lincei CCCL, "Notizie degli Scavi di Antichità" 78, Rome 1953, p. 345-352;
36. Scirpo P.D., Bibliografia generale su Akrai. Addenda e Corrigenda, "Studi Acrensi", IV, pp. 150–172;
37. Schubring I., Akrai – Palazzolo. Ein topographisch-archaeologische Skizze, Jahrbuch für klassische Philologie, suppl. IV, 1867, p. 661-672;
38. Uggeri G., La viabilità della Sicilia in età romana, "Journal of Ancient Topography (Rivista di Topografia Antica", suppl. II, 2004;
39. Voza G., Akrai, in: Archeologia nella Sicilia sud-orientale, P. Pelagatti, G. Voza (eds)., Napoli 1973, p. 127-128;
40. Voza G., Nel segno dell'antico. Archeologia nel territorio di Siracusa, Palermo 1999;
41. Więcek T., Chowaniec R., Guzzardi L., Greek Akrai and Roman Acrae. New numismatic evidence. Polish-Italian archaeological excavations 2011-2012, "Archeologia" 62-63, 2011-12 (2014), p. 19-30;
42. Wilson R.J.A., Sicily under the Roman Empire. The archaeology of Roman province, 36 BC – AD 535, Warminster 1990.
