= 2019 Zigong earthquake =

2019 earthquake in Zigong City, China

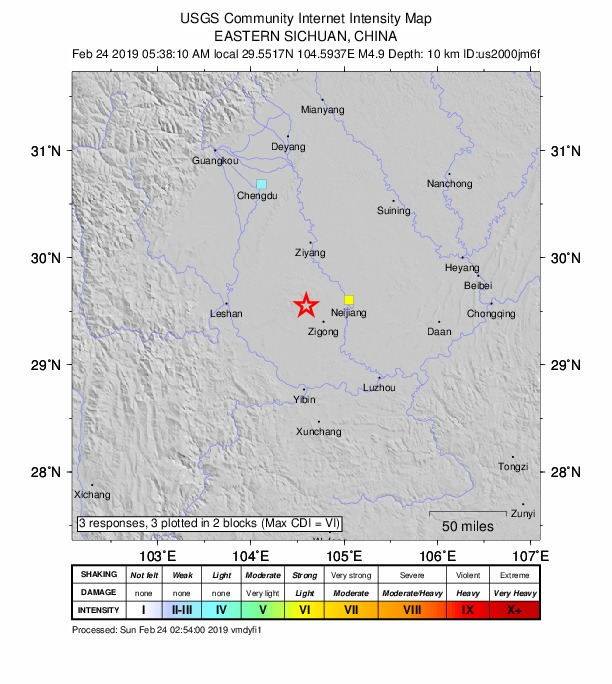
- Intensity map produced by the U.S. Geological Survey based on felt reports collected from the online Internet Feeling Survey.

- Location within Sichuan
- UTC time: 2019-02-25 05:15:59
- ISC event
- USGS-ANSS: ComCat
- Local date: 25 February 2019
- Local time: 13:15:59
- Magnitude: M_{s} 4.9 (CENC) mb 4.9 (USGS)
- Depth: 5 km (3.1 mi)
- Epicenter: China, Sichuan Province, Zigong City, Rong County; 29.48°N 104.49°E
- Total damage: 2 dead 12 injured
- Max. intensity: CSIS VI

The 2019 Zigong earthquake (also known as the Rongxian earthquake) occurred in Zigong, Sichuan Province, China, at about 13:15 on February 25, 2019. The epicentre was located in Rongxian County (29.48 degrees north latitude, 104.49 degrees east longitude), with a magnitude of M_{s} 4.9, a focal depth of about 5 km and a maximum intensity of VI. The earthquake killed two people and injured 12 others (3 of them seriously).

== Seismic background ==
Rong County belongs to the moderate seismic activity area in Sichuan. According to the China Earthquake Administration, there are nine smaller-scale ruptures within 100 km of the epicentre. Since the Sichuan earthquake network began observing earthquakes in 1970, five earthquakes of magnitude 4.0 or greater within 50 km of the epicentre have occurred. The largest earthquake of magnitude was a 4.8 magnitude earthquake that occurred on March 29, 1985. Since the Sichuan region was in a relatively active period of seismic activity at the time of this earthquake's occurrence, Rong County has also experienced continued active small earthquakes in recent years.

Du Fang, director of the Sichuan Earthquake Forecasting Research Center, said Earthquakes in Sichuan province have the characteristics of being strong in the west and weak in the east. Judging from historical records and actual structures, there is no tectonic basis for a strong earthquake of magnitude 6 or greater in Rong County.

=== Foreshocks ===
On February 24, 2019, at 05:38—32 hours before the main shock——an earthquake with a magnitude of M_{s} 4.7 occurred in Rongxian, Zigong City, Sichuan Province, at a depth of about 5 km. According to the investigation of Zigong City Earthquake and Disaster Prevention and Mitigation Bureau at that time, the earthquake was strongly felt in Rong County. There were isolated cases of cracking of houses in Gaoshan town, but no casualties were caused. 27 hours later, about 5 hours before the main shock, another earthquake with a magnitude of M_{s} 4.3 occurred in the area, at a depth of 5 km also.

== Earthquake ==
According to the China Seismological Network, the epicentre of the earthquake was located in Rong County, Zigong City, Sichuan Province, China (29.48°N, 104.49°E), with a magnitude of M_{s} 4.9, a depth of about 5 km, and a maximum intensity of VI degrees. The U.S. Geological Survey and the European Mediterranean Seismological Center (EMEC) determined the same numerical magnitude as that of China, both at mb 4.9, while both measured a source depth of about 10 km. The lower magnitudes measured by the GEOFON standard station network of the German Research Centre for Geosciences, for MB 4.8 level. In addition, based on seismic reports collected by the online Internet seismic survey, the USGS, the maximum intensity of this earthquake was presumed to be VI on February 24, 2019. And after 2 days, the agency revised the intensity presumed by this method to IV.

== Earthquake Damage ==
The epicentre of the earthquake was only 8 km from the county seat of Rongxian, 32 km of downtown Zigong and 136 km of downtown Chengdu. In addition to the strong tremor felt in the epicentre area, residents living in Yibin City also reported significant tremors. At the time of the earthquake, two residents of Takayama town were killed and 12 others were injured when they were hit by the balcony railing of a collapsed house while walking in the street. Of these, 3 were seriously injured and the other 9 were slightly injured. After investigation, a total of 9 houses collapsed and another 10,911 houses were damaged in this earthquake, which also caused cracks in the roofs of 5 small reservoirs, including Shuidagou Reservoir in Gao Shan Town. It is estimated that this earthquake caused a total direct economic loss of 13.99 million RMB.

== Response ==
At around 14:00 on the same day, a 20-member field team led by Lei Jiancheng, deputy director of the Sichuan Earthquake Bureau, went to the Rongxian disaster area to investigate . On the same day, Huang Ming, Secretary of the Party Group of the Ministry of Emergency Management of the People's Republic of China, and Zheng Guoguang, Director of the China Earthquake Administration, gave instructions on emergency work through the emergency command system. At 0:30 a.m., the next morning, a team of experts from the Ministry of Emergency Management, led by Yu Shuming, deputy director of the monitoring and forecasting division of the China Earthquake Administration, arrived at the disaster area in Rong County, and a working meeting was held at the on-site command of the Sichuan Provincial Earthquake Bureau.

During the investigation before the earthquake, Gaoshan Town, Rongxian County, the epicentre of the earthquake, found 7 potential disasters. After the 24-day foreshock, the Sichuan Provincial Department of Natural Resources said that no significant changes were found in any of the seven previously identified Geotechnical hazard sites in Gao Shan town.

Although the magnitude of this earthquake was not large, there were casualties. According to He Yulin, a senior engineer at the Sichuan Earthquake Bureau's Engineering Seismology Research Institute, casualties occurred because some old buildings in the area did not meet the current seismic protection standards after completion and the structure of some buildings would be more vulnerable after three consecutive earthquakes in just two days. According to the Earthquake Parameter Zoning Map of China (Fifth Edition), the epicentre area, including Rong County is located in the VI degree fortification zone, and the maximum intensity of this earthquake is also VI degrees.

== Related controversies ==
Rong County, together with Yibin Changning County and Neijiang Weiyuan County, formed the "Changning-Rongxian-Weiyuan National Shale Gas Industry Demonstration Zone" in 2016, and in August of the same year, Zigong reached a strategic partnership with Sinopec Southwest Oil and Gas Branch for shale gas exploration, development and utilization. After the earthquake, some Zigong residents believed that the local shale gas extraction project caused the earthquake, and thousands of local Zigong residents, thus launched a protest march and surrounded the local government, with some aggressive protesters clashing with local officials, forcing a division of CNPC to suspend operations.

To help residents eliminate their fear of earthquakes, the Sichuan Earthquake Bureau on-site task force entered the affected counties the day after the earthquake to carry out propaganda activities on earthquake prevention and scientific knowledge. Du Fang, director of the Sichuan Earthquake Prediction Research Center, said, "The overall level of seismic activity in the area of Rongxian County, Zigong, where three consecutive earthquakes of magnitude 4 or higher occurred, is low. According to current research, the earthquakes that occurred were all tectonic earthquakes triggered by natural causes. No local tectonic base and gestation conditions exist for destructive earthquakes of magnitude 6 or higher. The main reason for the high interest in earthquakes in this region is related to the high population density in the area. For buildings with adequate fortification standards, earthquakes of magnitude 4 or so generally do not cause major damage."
