= Rong County, Sichuan =

Rong County 荣县
- County
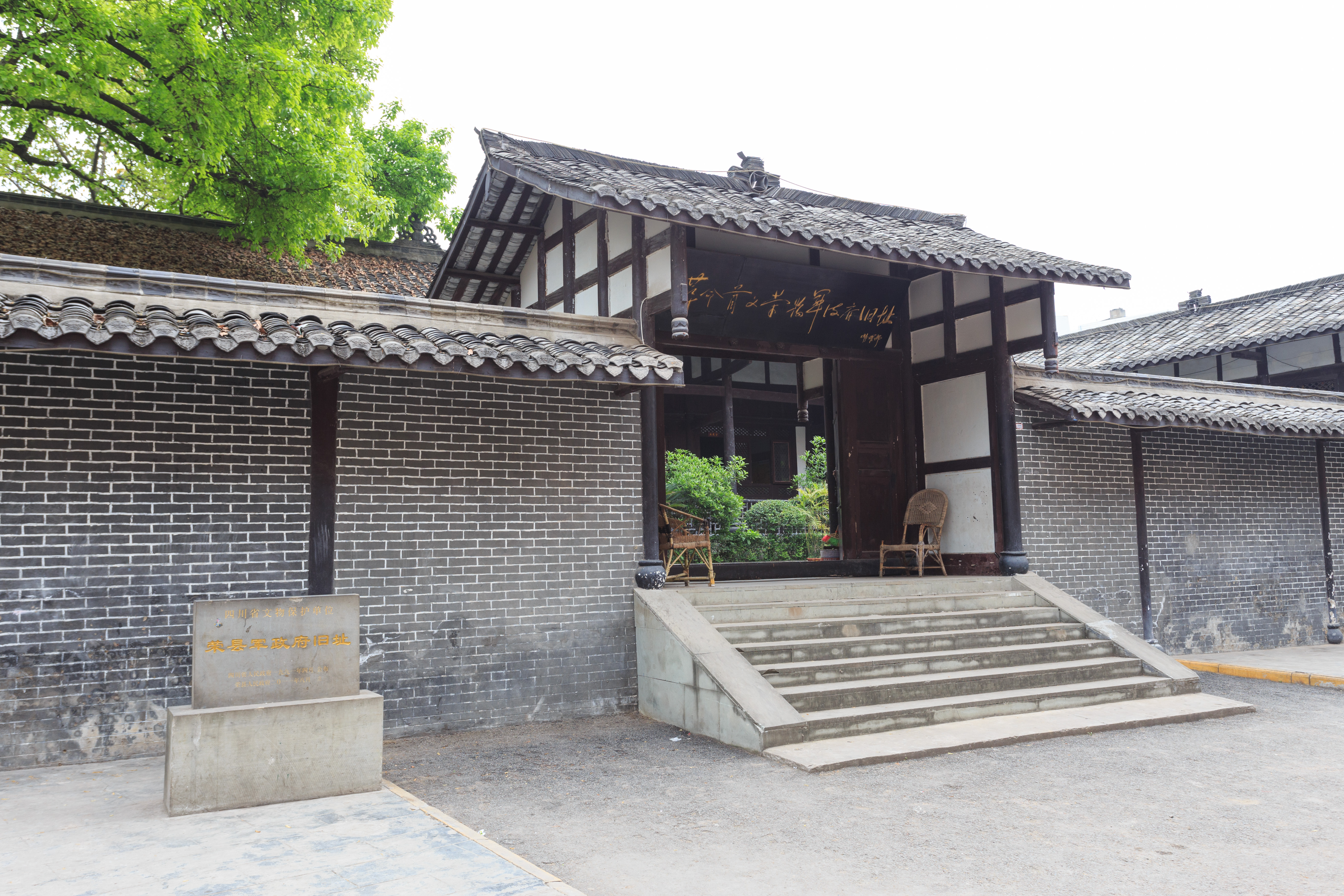

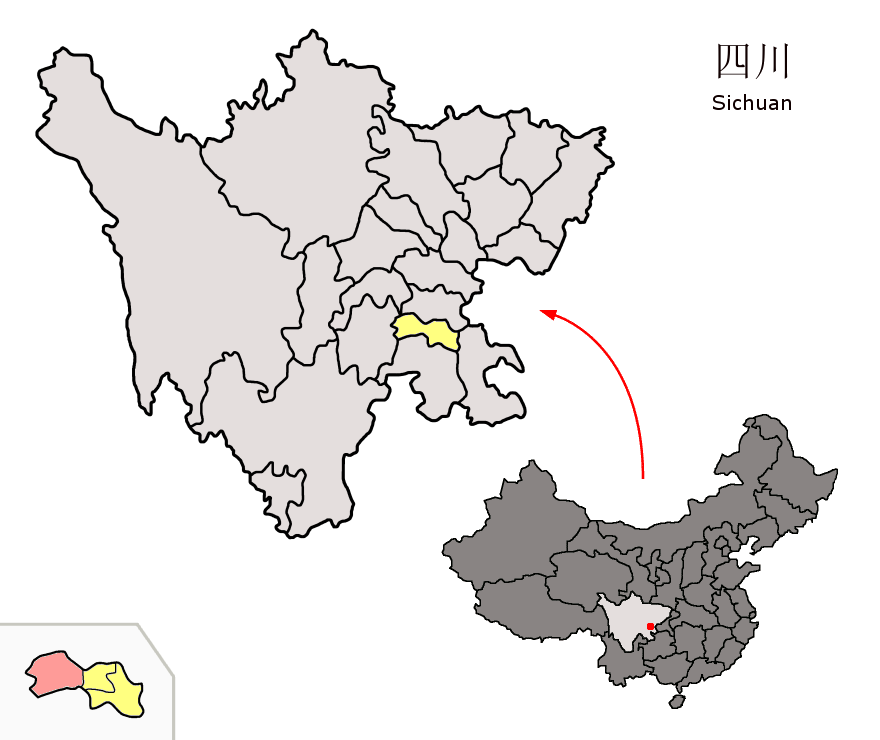
- Location of Rong County (red) within Zigong City (yellow) and Sichuan
- Coordinates: 29°26′43″N 104°25′03″E
- Country: China
- Province: Sichuan
- Prefecture-level city: Zigong
- County seat: Xuyang Town

Area
  - Total: 1,598.97 km^{2} (617.37 sq mi)

Population (2018)
  - Total: 540,000
  - Density: 340/km^{2} (870/sq mi)
- Time zone: UTC+8 (China Standard)

Rongxian
- Traditional Chinese: 榮縣
- Simplified Chinese: 荣县
- Postal: Junghsien
Transcriptions
Standard Mandarin
- Hanyu Pinyin: Róngxìan
- Wade–Giles: Jung^{2}-hsien^{4}

Rong County or Rongxian is a county of Sichuan Province, China. It is under the administration of Zigong city.

== Geography ==
The county has a total area of 1,609 km^{2} (621 sq mi). The average elevation above sea level of county is 230 m.

== Administrative divisions ==
Rong County administers 2 subdistricts and 19 towns:

subdistricts

- Wutong 梧桐街道
- Qingyang 青阳街道

towns

- Xuyang 旭阳镇
- Shuangshi 双石镇
- Dingxin 鼎新镇
- Lede 乐德镇
- Guwen 古文镇
- Hekou 河口镇
- Xinqiao 新桥镇
- Zhengzi 正紫镇
- Dujia 度佳镇
- Dongjia 东佳镇
- Changshan 长山镇
- Baohua 保华镇
- Liujia 留佳镇
- Laimou 来牟镇
- Shuanggu 双古镇
- Guanshan 观山镇
- Gaoshan 高山镇
- Dongxing 东兴镇
- Tiechang 铁厂镇

== Population ==
As of 2008, the county had a population of 700,000.

== Climate ==
Climate data for Rongxian, elevation 384 m (1,260 ft), (1991–2020 normals, extremes 1981–present)
Month	Jan	Feb	Mar	Apr	May	Jun	Jul	Aug	Sep	Oct	Nov	Dec	Year
Record high °C (°F)	19.7 (67.5)	23.6 (74.5)	31.9 (89.4)	34.6 (94.3)	37.3 (99.1)	37.7 (99.9)	41.2 (106.2)	39.7 (103.5)	37.9 (100.2)	31.0 (87.8)	25.7 (78.3)	19.3 (66.7)	41.2 (106.2)
Mean daily maximum °C (°F)	10.2 (50.4)	13.4 (56.1)	18.3 (64.9)	23.9 (75.0)	27.4 (81.3)	29.0 (84.2)	31.4 (88.5)	31.3 (88.3)	26.7 (80.1)	21.4 (70.5)	17.1 (62.8)	11.6 (52.9)	21.8 (71.2)
Daily mean °C (°F)	7.3 (45.1)	9.8 (49.6)	14.0 (57.2)	19.0 (66.2)	22.5 (72.5)	24.6 (76.3)	26.9 (80.4)	26.6 (79.9)	22.8 (73.0)	18.2 (64.8)	13.9 (57.0)	8.8 (47.8)	17.9 (64.1)
Mean daily minimum °C (°F)	5.2 (41.4)	7.4 (45.3)	10.9 (51.6)	15.3 (59.5)	18.8 (65.8)	21.4 (70.5)	23.6 (74.5)	23.2 (73.8)	20.2 (68.4)	16.1 (61.0)	11.7 (53.1)	6.8 (44.2)	15.1 (59.1)
Record low °C (°F)	−2.2 (28.0)	−0.7 (30.7)	0.8 (33.4)	6.7 (44.1)	10.0 (50.0)	15.1 (59.2)	18.1 (64.6)	16.4 (61.5)	13.9 (57.0)	5.6 (42.1)	2.9 (37.2)	−1.7 (28.9)	−2.2 (28.0)
Average precipitation mm (inches)	10.1 (0.40)	13.0 (0.51)	28.0 (1.10)	60.4 (2.38)	84.5 (3.33)	150.5 (5.93)	191.1 (7.52)	216.1 (8.51)	108.7 (4.28)	49.2 (1.94)	19.7 (0.78)	8.6 (0.34)	939.9 (37.02)
Average precipitation days (≥ 0.1 mm)	8.9	8.0	10.2	12.2	14.3	15.8	14.3	13.8	15.5	15.2	8.7	7.9	144.8
Average snowy days	0.5	0.2	0	0	0	0	0	0	0	0	0	0.2	0.9
Average relative humidity (%)	82	78	74	72	72	80	81	80	83	85	82	83	79
Mean monthly sunshine hours	54.3	64.8	109.7	142.4	146.2	122.6	168.0	176.1	100.0	65.3	68.1	50.0	1,267.5
Percentage possible sunshine	17	20	29	37	35	29	40	44	27	19	22	16	28
Source: China Meteorological Administration all-time January highall-time July high

== History ==
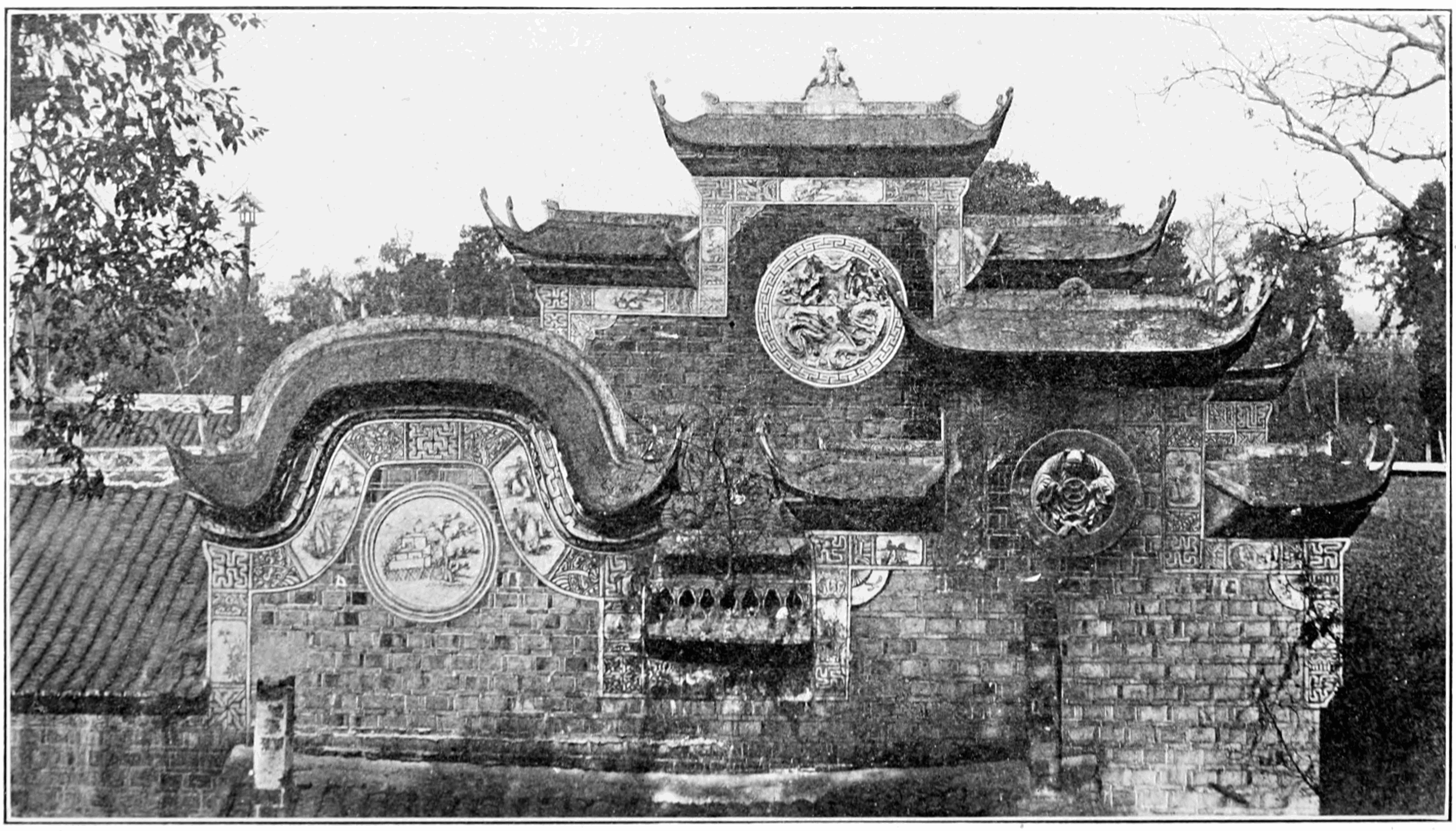
A Temple in Yong-hien, the city below the Great Buddha in 1910

== See also ==
- Rongxian Giant Buddha
- 2019 Zigong Earthquake
