= Mengshan Giant Buddha =

Buddha statue in Taiyuan, Shanxi, China

Mengshan Giant Buddha 蒙山大佛
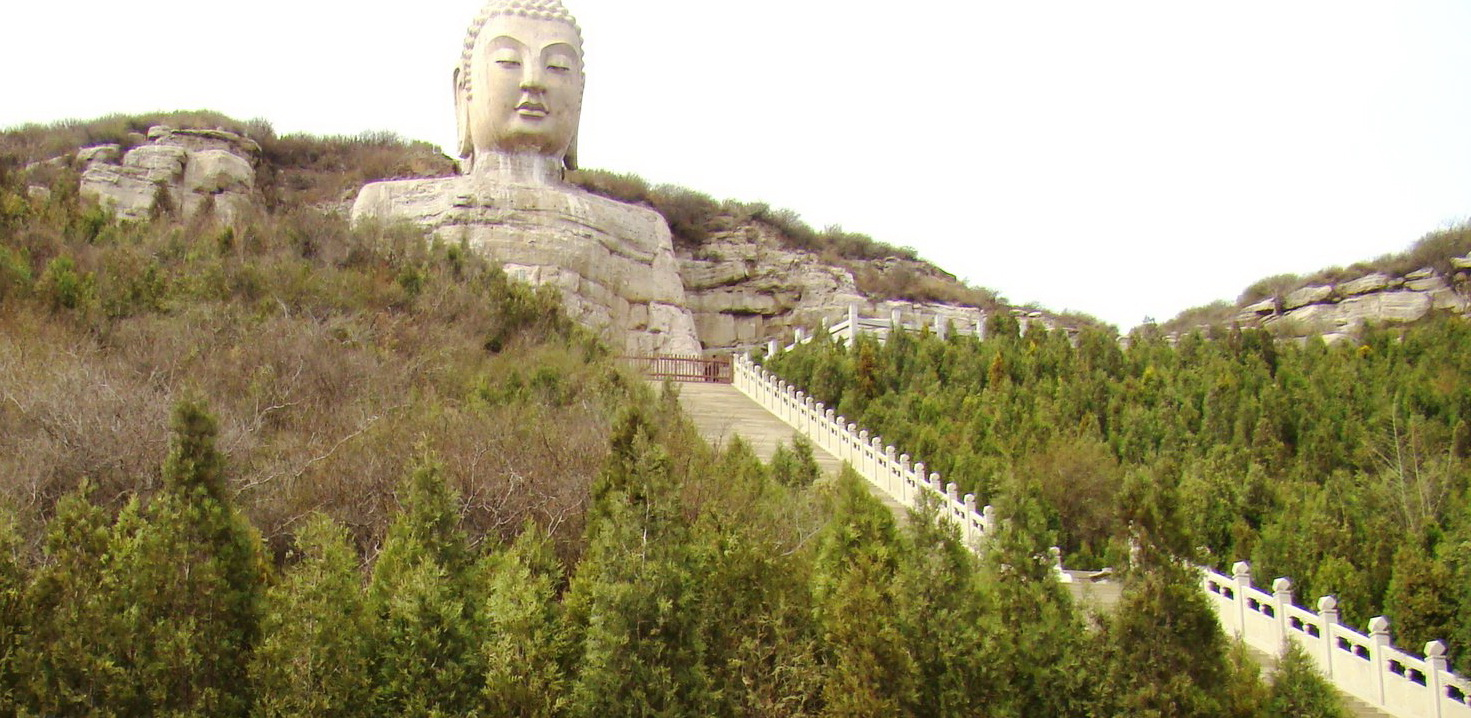
- Dimensions: 63 m (207 ft)
- Location: Jinyuan District, Taiyuan, Shanxi; 37°46′48″N 112°26′48″E

The Mengshan Giant Buddha (Chinese: 蒙山大佛; pinyin: Méngshān Dàfó) is a stone statue located in the city of Taiyuan, Shanxi and was built during the Northern Qi dynasty. Initially discovered in a 1980 census, the statue was found to have its head missing. From 2006 to 2008, people constructed a 12-meter tall head for the statue. The site opened to the public in October 2008.
