= Renshou Giant Buddha =

Buddha sculpture in Sichuan, China

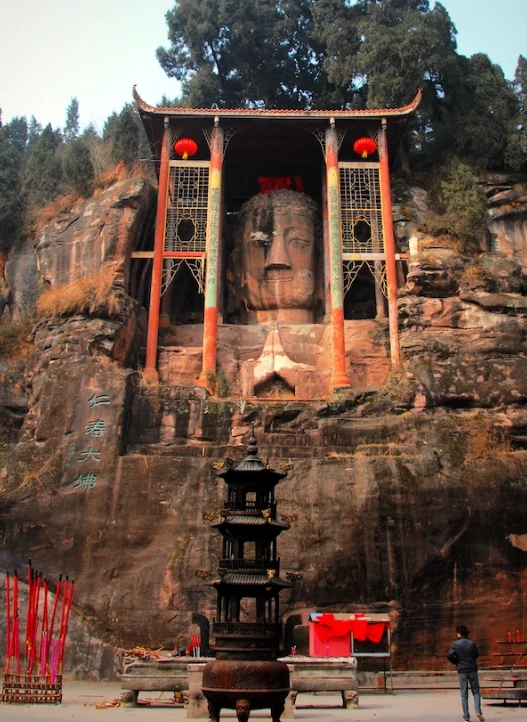
Front facing image of the Buddha

Renshou Giant Buddha (traditional Chinese: 仁壽大佛; simplified Chinese: 仁寿大佛; pinyin: Rénshòu Dàfó), also known as Niujiaozhai Giant Buddha (牛角寨大佛), is a large stone Buddha located within Renshou County, Sichuan. It is 60 kilometers south of Chengdu. The Buddha was carved in 707 during the Tang dynasty. It was constructed six years earlier in the nearby famous Leshan Giant Buddha. Located around the statue are over 101 shrines belonging to Buddhism, Confucianism, and Taoism.

== See also ==
- Rongxian Giant Buddha
