= Jean-Pierre Houël =

French Neoclassical painter and engraver (1735–1813)

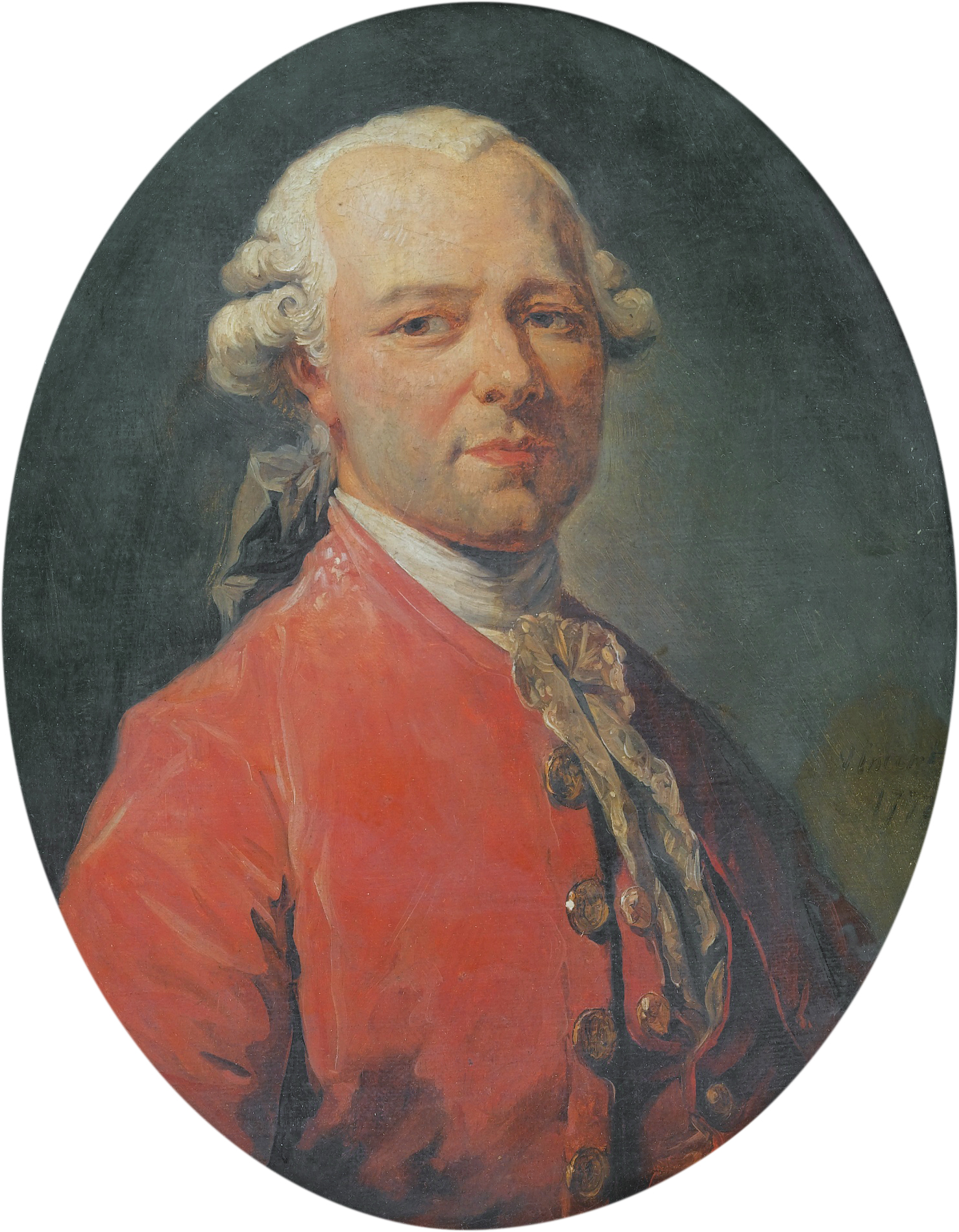
- Portrait of Houël by François-André Vincent
- Born: 28 June 1735; Rouen, Kingdom of France
- Died: 14 November 1813 (aged 78); France
- Occupation: Neoclassical painter

Jean-Pierre-Louis-Laurent Houël (28 June 1735 – 14 November 1813) was a French painter, engraver and draftsman. During his long life, Houël witnessed the reign of Louis XV, the French Revolution, and the period of Napoleon's First Empire.

== Biography ==
He was born at Rouen into a family of prosperous artisans, who sent him to the city's drawing academy when he was fifteen.

Here he was exposed to the art of early Dutch and Flemish painters, which was to have a defining impact on his chosen specialty of landscape painting. In 1758 Houël published a book of landscape engravings, and in 1768 he painted six views of the Duc de Choiseul's country estate, the Château de Chanteloup. The following year his influential patrons secured a place for him at the French Academy in Rome. Here, captivated with Italian customs, landscapes, and ancient sites, he traveled throughout southern Italy, making gouache drawings, which he presented at the Paris Salons of the early 1770s, exhibits that drew the attention of a wide public.

He spent the years 1776 to 1779 traveling in Sicily, Lipari, and Malta, after which, based on his journey, he published a series of four volumes of lavishly illustrated travel books (1782–1787). Houël's main intention was to illustrate local topography, but his delicate applications of watercolor also magnificently captured the effects of light and atmosphere. To help finance these projects, he sold his preliminary drawings in Paris in 1780. Louis XVI purchased 46, and Catherine II of Russia, more than 500, of which 260 are preserved at the Hermitage Museum in St. Petersburg.

In his later years, Houël published two illustrated treatises on elephants. Drawings of other animals suggest he was preparing to publish further zoological works; however, his death at the age of seventy-eight cut short his plans.

Prise de la Bastille (1789)

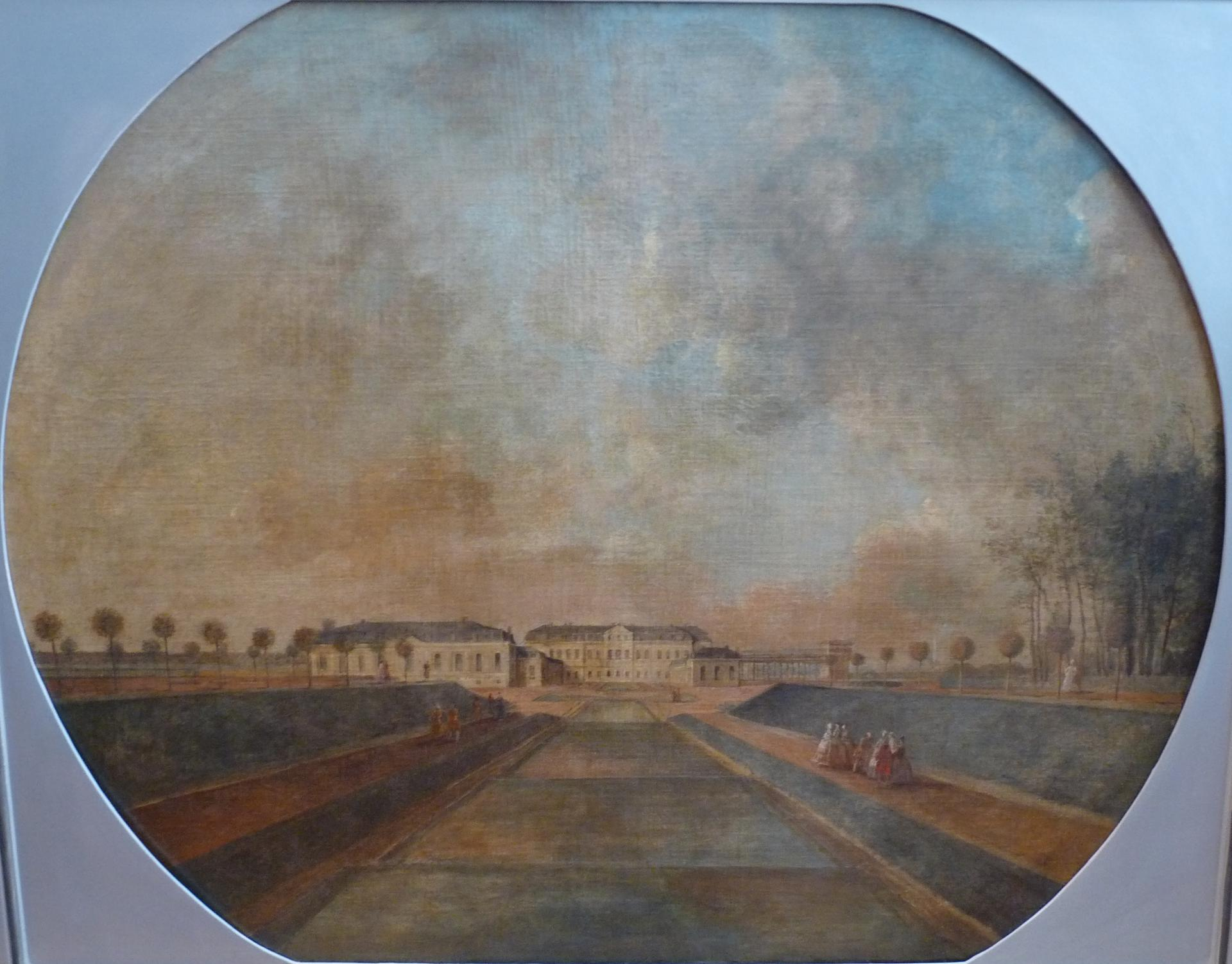
View of the Château de Chanteloup from the south

== Sources ==
- Conisbee, Philip (1996). "Hoüel, Jean-Pierre-Louis-Laurent", vol. 14, p. 799, in The Dictionary of Art, edited by Jane Turner, reprinted with minor corrections in 1998. New York: Grove. ISBN 9781884446009. Also at Oxford Art Online (subscription required).
