= Adelphius =

Adelphius or Adelfius may refer to:

- Adelphius of Onuphis (4th century), Egyptian bishop
- Clodius Celsinus Adelphius (fl. 333–351), Roman politician
- Adelfius, a bishop from Britain noted as attending the 314 Council of Arles
- Adelfius I (bishop of Limoges) (b. c. 390), grandfather of St Ruricius
- Adelphius of Poitiers (fl. 533), bishop
- Adelfius II (bishop of Limoges) (fl. 4th century)
- Adelfius III (bishop of Limoges) (fl. late 7th century)

== See also ==
- Adelphus, bishop of Metz
- Adelfer
- Adelfia
- Adelfo
- Adelpha
- Adelphi (disambiguation)
- Adelphia (disambiguation)
