= Adelphi =

Adelphi (from Ancient Greek: ἀδελφός, adelphós, 'brother') may refer to:

== Arts and entertainment ==
- Adelphi (band), an American rock band
- The Adelphi, an English literary journal 1923–1955
- Adelphi Papers, a monograph series of the International Institute for Strategic Studies
- Adelphi Records, a record label
- Adelphoe, or Adelphi – The Brothers, a play by Terence

== Business, organisations and buildings ==
=== Hotels ===
- Adelphi Hotel, Melbourne, Australia
- Adelphi Hotel, Sheffield, England
- Adelphi Hotel, York, England
- Britannia Adelphi Hotel, Liverpool, England

=== Universities ===
- Adelphi University, in Garden City, New York, U.S.
- Adelphi campus, of the University of Salford, England
- Adelphi commons, at Arizona State University, U.S.

=== Other businesses and organisations ===
- Adelphia Communications Corporation. a former cable and internet operator
- Adelphi Edizioni, an Italian publishing house
- Adelphi Films, a British film production company founded in 1939
- Adelphi (Exeter College, Oxford), a wine club in Oxford
- Adelphi Whisky, a whisky bottler and former distillery in Scotland

=== Other buildings ===
- Adelphi Building, in Victoria, British Columbia, Canada
- Adelphi Buildings, in London, England
- Adelphi Cinema, in Dublin, Ireland
- Adelphi Theatre, in London, England
- Adelphi Theatre (New York City), U.S.
- Adelphi Theatre (Dublin), rebuilt in 1844 as Queen's Theatre, Dublin, in Ireland

== Places ==
- Adelphi, Iowa, an unincorporated community in Iowa, U.S.
- Adelphi, Maryland, U.S.
- Adelphi, Ohio, U.S.
- Adelphi, Texas, U.S.
- Adelphi, U.S. Virgin Islands
- Adelphi, London, a district of the City of Westminster in London, England

== Other uses ==
- USNS Adelphi, a U.S. Navy ship
- Adelphi Canal, former canal in Derbyshire, England

== See also ==
- Adelfia
- Adelphia (disambiguation)
- Adelphi Charter of the Royal Society for the encouragement of Arts, Manufactures & Commerce in London, England
- Delphi (disambiguation)
- Philadelphia
