= Adelphia =

- Adelphia (album), a 2009 album by A Skylit Drive
- Adelphia (moth), a genus of moths
- Adelphia Coliseum or Nissan Stadium
- Adelphia College, a college in Seattle, Washington
- Adelphia Communications Corporation, a defunct cable television company
- Adelphia, New Jersey
- Adelphia (plant), a genus of woody-vined flowering plants
- Adelphia Plantation, a historic house in Edgecombe County, North Carolina
- Adelphia (roman noble)
- Adelphia School, a Howell Township Public School
- "Adelphia", a 2019 song by the Cat Empire from their album Stolen Diamonds
- Sarcophagus of Adelphia: 4th century paleo-Christian sarcophagus found near Siracusa, Sicily

== See also ==
- Adelfia
- Adelphi (disambiguation)
- Philadelphia
