= Elasmopalpus angustellus =

Scientific classification
- Kingdom: Animalia
- Phylum: Arthropoda
- Class: Insecta
- Order: Lepidoptera
- Family: Pyralidae
- Subfamily: Phycitinae
- Genus: Elasmopalpus
- Species: E. angustellus

Binomial name
- Elasmopalpus angustellus Blanchard, 1852

Species of snout moths

Elasmopalpus angustellus is a species of snout moths in the diverse subfamily Phycitinae. It was described by Émile Blanchard in 1852.

Elasmopalpus lignosellus has been considered a synonym of E. lignosellus. Clarke (1965), however, re-investigated the two species and found E. angustellus to be a separate species that is confined to Chile and the Juan Fernández Islands, with material from Brazil, Argentina, Mexico and North America correctly assigned to E. lignosellus.
