= Ufa (moth) =

Scientific classification
- Kingdom: Animalia
- Phylum: Arthropoda
- Class: Insecta
- Order: Lepidoptera
- Family: Pyralidae
- Subfamily: Phycitinae
- Genus: Ufa; Walker, 1863

Genus of moths

Ufa is a moth genus in the subfamily Phycitinae of the family Pyralidae. The genus is distributed in the Americas. While sharing certain morphological characters in the female genitalia with Adelphia, Ufa appears closest related to Elasmopalpus.

The genus currently comprises three species: the type species, Ufa venezuelalis, described by Francis Walker in 1863, is now considered a junior synonym of the older name Ufa rubedinella (Zeller, 1848). The genus furthermore comprises Ufa lithosella (Ragonot, 1887) and Ufa senta Heinrich, 1956.

The caterpillars of U. rubedinella feed on the leaves of lima beans and black-eyed peas in the Fabaceae plant family.
