= Non-Catholic Cemetery, Syracuse =

Cemetery in Syracuse, Sicily, Italy

Cimitero Acattolico di Siracusa Non-Catholic Cemetery of Syracuse
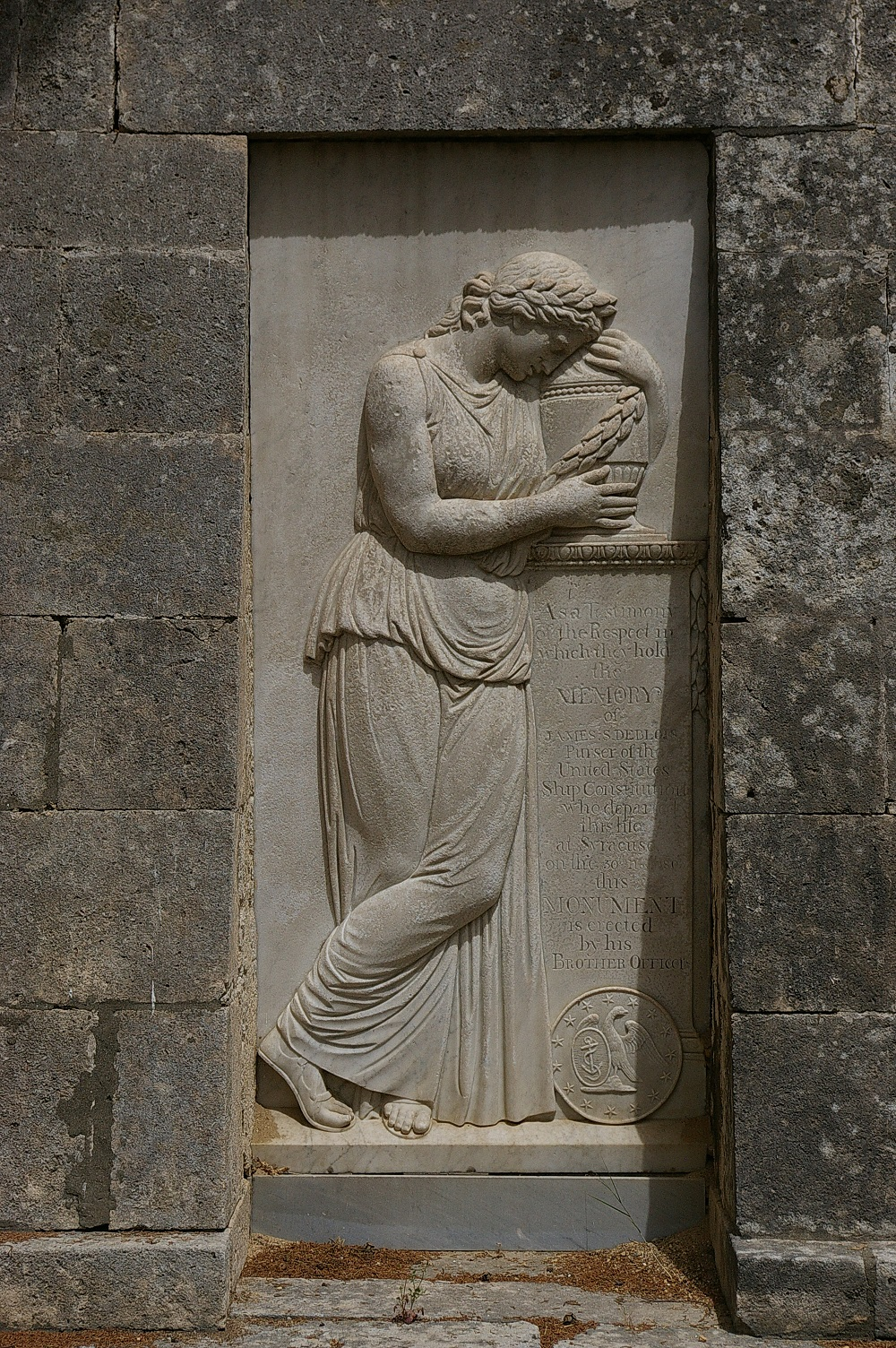
- Tomb of James Deblois
- Interactive map of Cimitero Acattolico di Siracusa; Non-Catholic Cemetery of Syracuse

Details
- Established: 1806
- Location: Syracuse
- Country: Italy
- Type: Public
- Style: 19th century European

The non-Catholic cemetery is situated in Syracuse, in the garden of Villa Landolina, now part of the Museo archeologico regionale Paolo Orsi. It was forbidden to bury in holy land non-Catholic people – including Protestants and Jews – as well as people having committed suicide.

The cemetery is very small and contains twelve tombs built in the 19th century for some foreigners who died in Syracuse, they usually were travelers or military men.

The German poet August von Platen and some American navy men who took part in the First Barbary War (1801-1805) are buried there. The Americans are Joseph Maxwell, Seth Cartee (Carter), William Tyler, James Deblois and George S. Hackey
