= Elasmopalpus =

Scientific classification
- Domain: Eukaryota
- Kingdom: Animalia
- Phylum: Arthropoda
- Class: Insecta
- Order: Lepidoptera
- Family: Pyralidae
- Subfamily: Phycitinae
- Genus: Elasmopalpus; C. É. Blanchard, 1852

Genus of moths

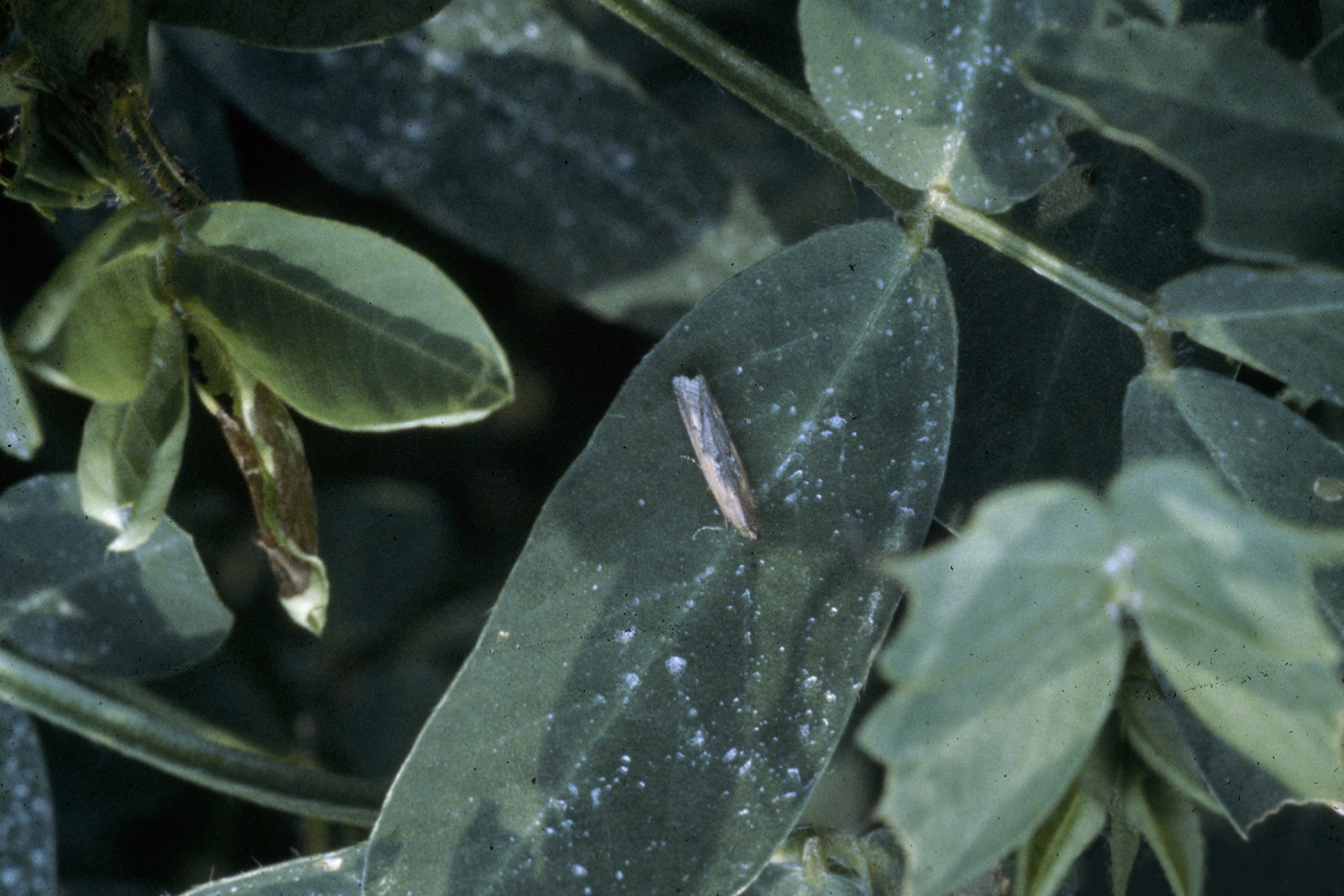

Elasmopalpus is a snout moth genus in the subfamily Phycitinae described by Émile Blanchard in 1852. The genus is restricted to the Americas and currently comprises three species: the type species E. angustellus, described by Blanchard together with the genus, E. corrientellus Ragonot, 1888, and E. lignosellus (Zeller, 1848), a pest species of Poaceae and Fabaceae crops that is widespread throughout the Americas. Elasmopalpus is considered to be closely related to the genus Ufa.
