= Museo archeologico regionale Paolo Orsi =

Archaeological museum in Syracuse, Sicily

Coordinates: 37.0764°N 15.2864°E

Regional Archeological Museum Paolo Orsi
- Museo archeologico regionale Paolo Orsi
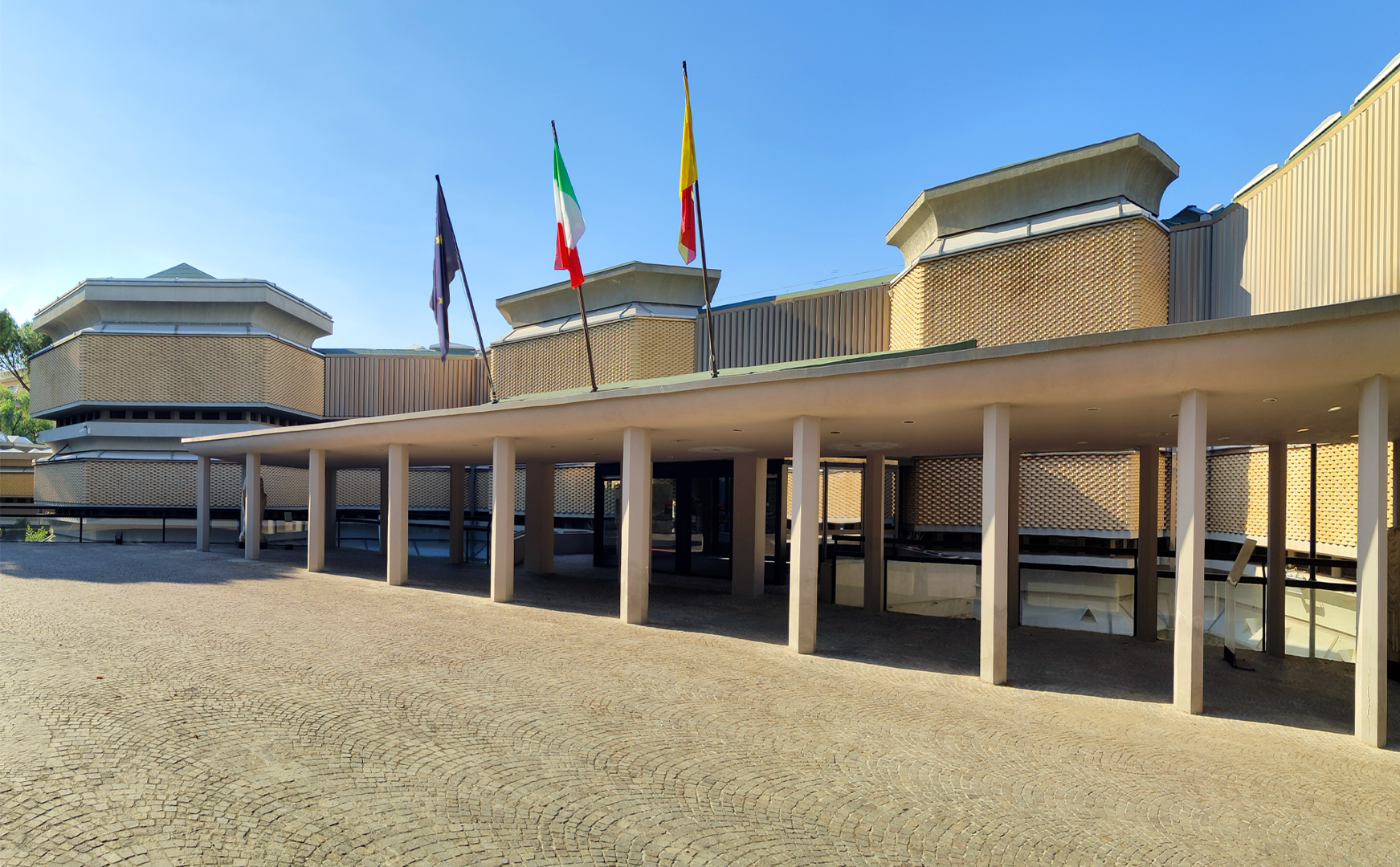
- Museum entrance, 2026
- Location: Syracuse, Italy
- Type: archaeology
- Website: Official website

The Museo Archeologico Regionale Paolo Orsi of Syracuse, Sicily is one of the principal archaeological museums of Europe.

== History ==
In 1780 the Bishop Alagona inaugurated the Museo del Seminario which became the Museo Civico near the archbishop's house in 1808. Subsequently, a royal decree of 17 June 1878 sanctioned the creation of the Museo Archeologico Nazionale di Siracusa, which was only inaugurated in 1886, in its historic location on the cathedral square.

From 1895 to 1934 Paolo Orsi directed the museum, but the increasing number of finds made a new space necessary at the current location in the garden of the villa Landolina. The new museum space, designed by the architect Franco Minissi was inaugurated in January 1988, with two floors of 9,000^{2}. Initially only one floor and a basement of 3,000 m^{2} containing an auditorium were open to the public.

In 2006, a new exhibition area on the upper floor was inaugurated, dedicated to the classical period, but more space still remained unused. In 2014 a final expansion allowed the display of the Sarcophagus of Adelphia and other finds from the catacombs of Syracuse.

A free partnership with Google Business Photos and Google Street View Indoor has mapped the entire museum and dozen of its archaeological finds into a Google web platform. Launched online in 2016, it provided the first 360° interactive tour for a cultural institution of the southern Italy.

== Museum ==
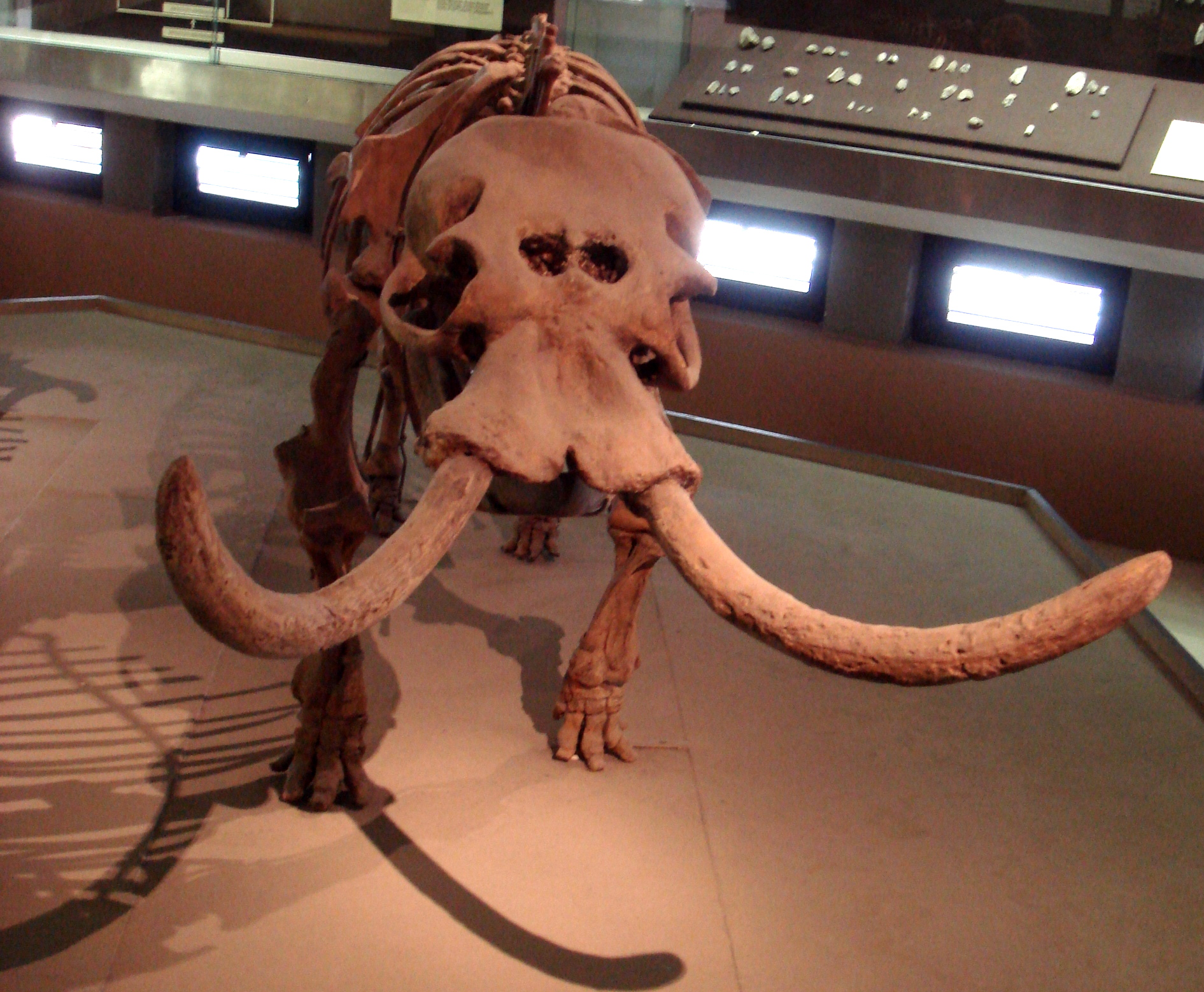
Dwarf elephant in the museum

The museum contains artefacts from the prehistoric, Greek and Roman periods found in archaeological excavations in the city and other sites in Sicily.

The space is divided into four sectors (A – D) and a central space (Area 1) which is dedicated to the history of the museum and briefly overviews the material displayed in the individual sectors.

=== Sector A ===
Sector A is dedicated to the prehistoric (Upper Palaeolithic-Iron Age) with a display of rocks and fossils which testify to the various animals found in Sicily in the Quaternary. It is preceded by a section which displays the geological characteristics of the Mediterranean Sea and the Iblean zone.

=== Sector B ===
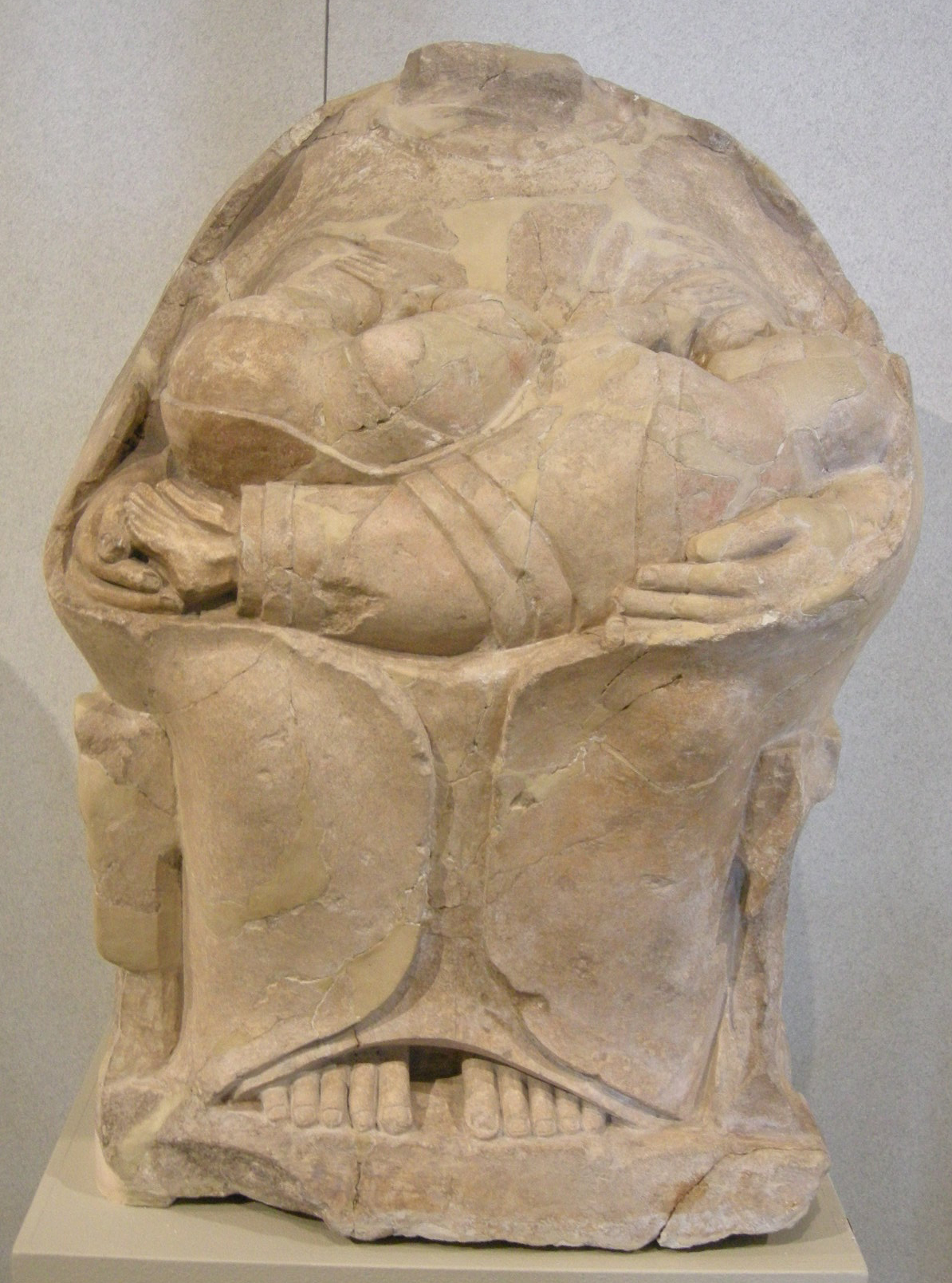
Kourotrophos

In sector B, dedicated to the Greek colonies in Sicily from the Ionic and Doric period, it is possible to see the locations of the Greek colonies in Sicily and their respective mother cities. Also on display:

- a headless marble statue of a Kouros, found at Leontini from the fifth century BC.
- a limestone kourotrophos, a headless female statue, holding two twins, which was found at Megara Hyblaea.
- votive statues of Demeter and Kore and a gorgon from the Doric colony at Megara Hyblaea
- a head of Augustus found at Centuripe.

=== Sector C ===
In sector C there are finds from the colonies of Syracuse: Akrai (664 BC), Kasmenai (644 BC), Camarina (598 BC), Eloro, as well as finds from other centres of eastern Sicily, Gela and Agrigento.

=== Sector D ===
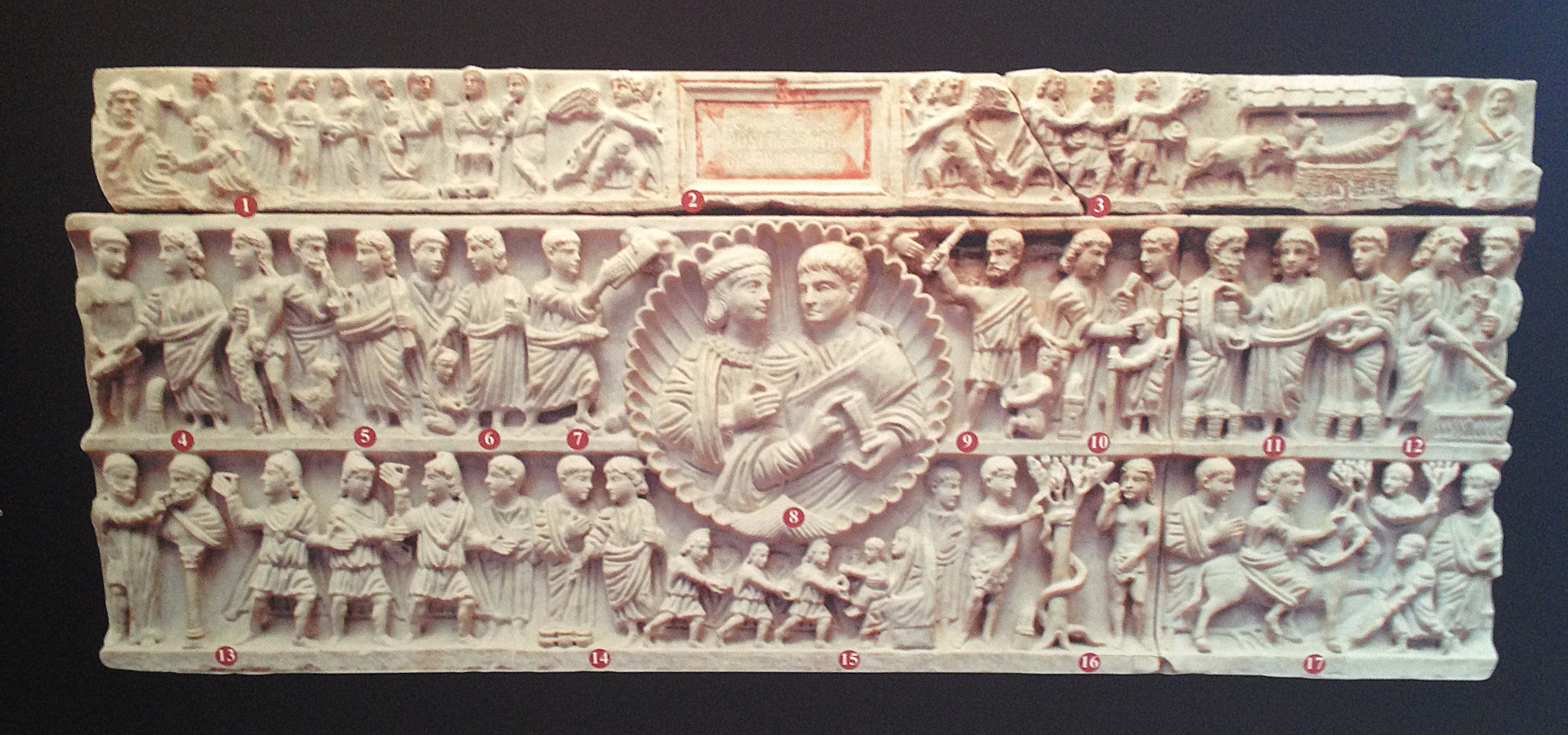
Sarcophagus of Adelphia with labels assigning scenes as 1. Life of Mary; 2. Inscription recalling Adelphia; 3. Adoration of the Magi (?); 4. Work imposed on Adam and Eve; 5. Denial of Peter; 6. Jesus healing the bleeding woman; 7. Moses receives tablets; 8. Image of Adelphia and her spouse Valerius; 9. Abraham and Isaac; 10. Christ heals the blind; 11. Miracle of loaves and fish; 12. Raising of the son of the widow of Nain; 13. Three hebrews refuse pagan worship (?); 14. Marriage at Cana; 15. Adoration of the Magi; 16. Adam and Eve commit original sin; 17. Jesus enters Jerusalem

Sector D, located on the upper floor and inaugurated in 2006, contains finds from the Hellenistic and Roman periods. It contains two of the most celebrated pieces in the museum, the Paleo-Christian Sarcophagus of Adelphia and the Venus Anadiomene, also called Venus Landolina after the location of its discovery, found in Syracuse in 1804 and described by Bernabò Brea as "for the excellence of its sculpting, an exquisite treatment of the naked form, of incredibly liveliness and softness". Moreover, a selection of coins from the numismatic cabinet of the piazza Duomo is on display.

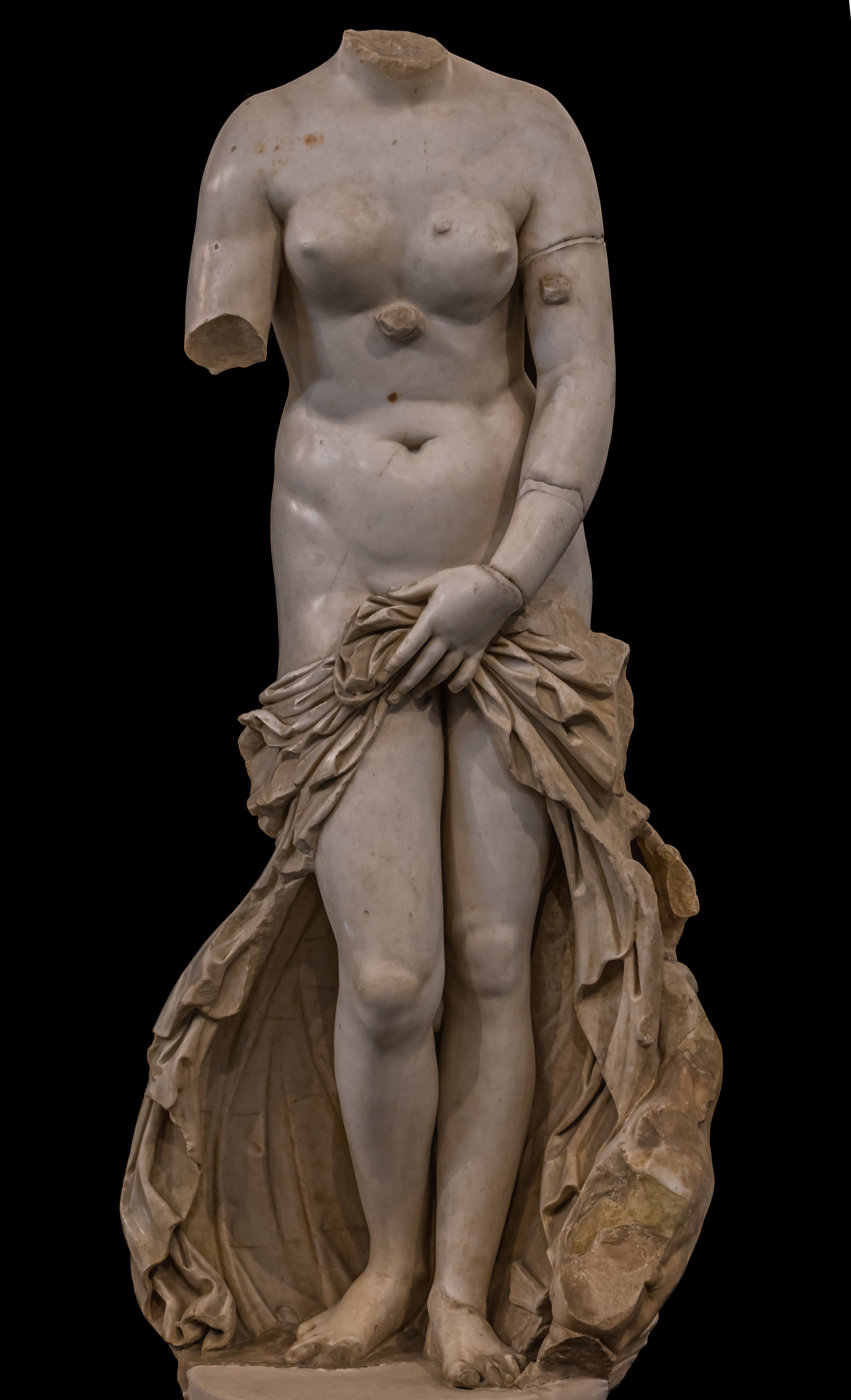
Front of Venus Landolina

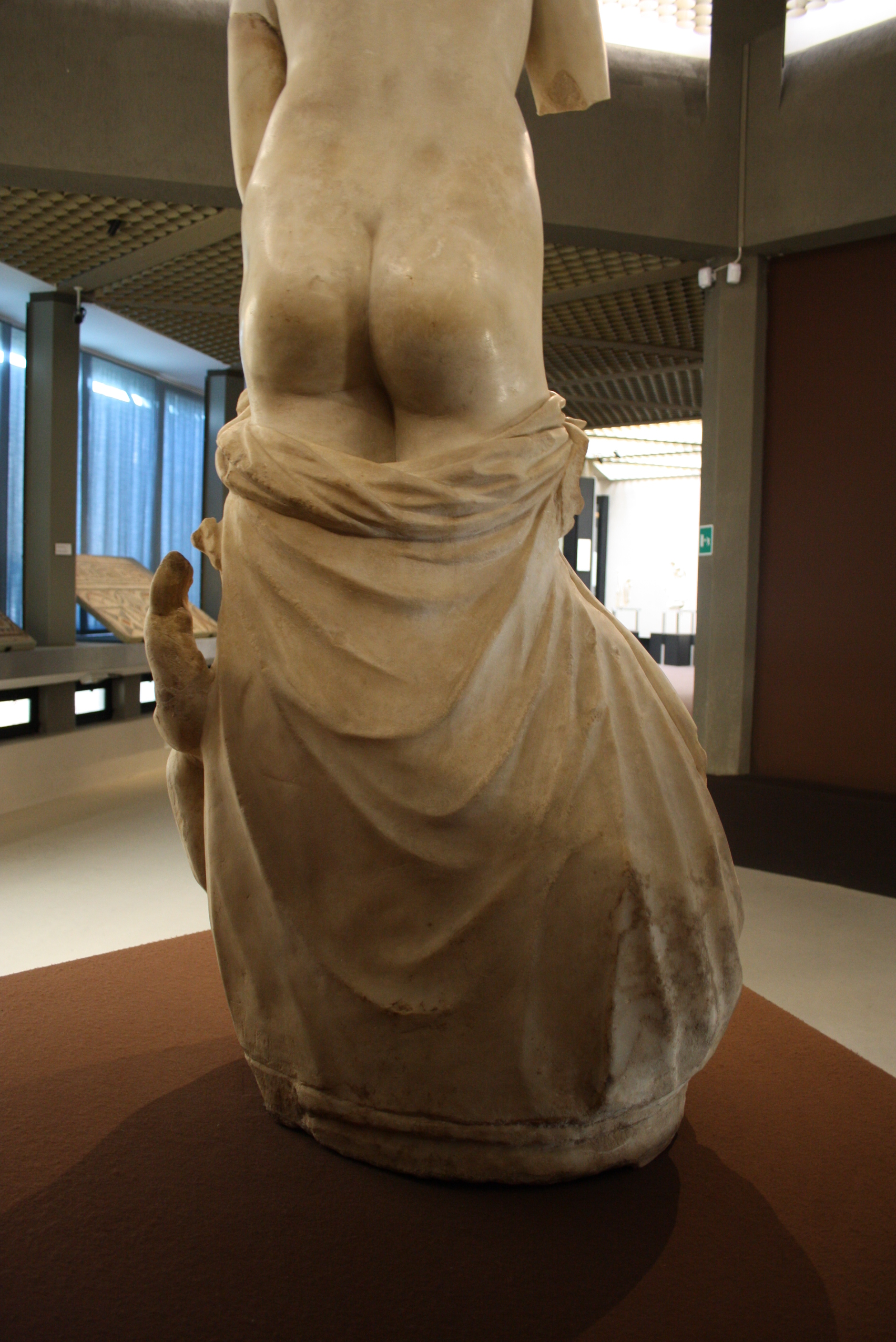
Rear of Venus Landolina

== Villa Landolina ==
Located next to the ancient Villa Landolina, outside the Museum, it is possible to visit the park opposite with finds from the Greek and Roman periods, as well as a non-Catholic cemetery with the tomb of the poet August von Platen.
