= Delphi (disambiguation) =

Delphi is an archaeological site in Greece.

Delphi may also refer to:

== Geography ==
=== In Greece ===
- Delphi (modern town), a town near the eponymous archaeological site
- Delphi, a mountain in Skopelos, Greece
- Delphic oracle or Pythia, located in Delphi

=== In the United States ===
- Delphi, Indiana, small city
- Delphi, Ohio, an unincorporated community
- Delphi, Washington, an unincorporated community

=== Elsewhere ===
- Delphi, County Mayo, settlement in County Mayo, Ireland

== Science ==
- DELPHI experiment (DEtector with Lepton, Photon and Hadron Identification), one of the four detectors of the Large Electron-Positron Collider at CERN
- Delphi method, a forecasting technique which relies on the input of many experts gathered anonymously

== Entertainment ==
- Delphi (Morlocks), a Marvel Comics character appearing in the Uncanny X-Men series
- Delphi (Pantheon), a Marvel Comics character appearing in the Incredible Hulk series

== Brands and enterprises ==
- Delphi Automotive, former name of the automotive systems corporation Aptiv
- Delphi Bank, a subsidiary of Bendigo and Adelaide Bank; previously the Bank of Cyprus Australia Limited
- Delphi Technologies, an automotive systems corporation spun off from Delphi Automotive, purchased by BorgWarner in 2020

== Computing ==
- Delphi (software), an Object Pascal dialect and integrated development environment owned by Embarcadero Technologies
- DelPhi, macromolecular electrostatics modeling software package
- Delphi online service a former internet service provider

== Crime ==
- Murders of Abigail Williams and Liberty German, known as the "Delphi murders" (2017)

== Education ==
- Delphian School, a school in Oregon using L. Ron Hubbard's (Scientology) teaching methods

== People ==
- Delphi Lawrence, English actress

== See also ==
- Adelphi (disambiguation)
- Delfi (disambiguation)
- Delhi
