= Seattle Preparatory School =

Location
- 2400 11th Avenue East; Seattle, (King County), Washington 98102; United States of America; 47.641387°N 122.317531°W

Information
- Type: Private
- Motto: Virtus in Arduis (Virtue in Hard Work)
- Religious affiliations: Roman Catholic; Jesuit
- Patron saint: St. Stanislaus Kostka
- Established: 1891; 135 years ago
- CEEB code: 481160
- President: Robert T. Jordan (since 2023)
- Principal: Dale Cote (Interim since 2025)
- Faculty: 135
- Grades: 9–12
- Gender: Coeducational
- Enrollment: 785-800 (2025-2026)
- Average class size: 22
- Student to teacher ratio: 11:1
- Campus type: Urban
- Colors: Blue, Grey, and white
- Slogan: Ad Majorem Dei Gloriam (For the greater glory of God)
- Fight song: "Hail to Thee Our Fighting Panthers"
- Athletics conference: Metro AAA League
- Mascot: Panther
- Nickname: Seattle Prep
- Team name: Panthers
- Rivals: Bishop Blanchet, Holy Names Academy, O'Dea High School
- Accreditation: Northwest Accreditation Commission
- Publication: Panther Tracks magazine
- Newspaper: The Seattle Prep Panther
- Tuition: $28,600 USD
- Website: seaprep.org
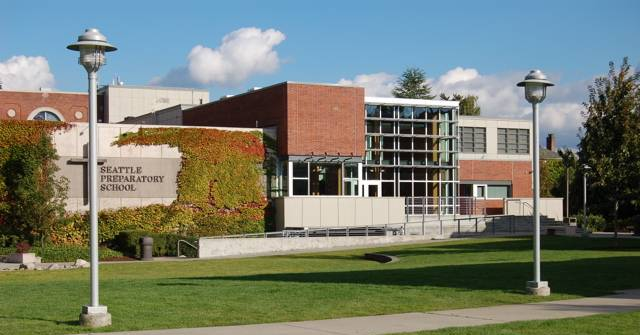
- McDonnell Hall with PACCAR Commons

Seattle Preparatory School, popularly known as Seattle Prep, is a private, Jesuit high school located on Capitol Hill in Seattle, Washington, United States.

After it was founded in 1891, Seattle Prep merged with Immaculate Conception Parish School, a local Jesuit Boys' School in First Hill which would later become Seattle University, in 1898 and became a part of Seattle College. From 1919 to 1931, Seattle College's only campus was at the current site of Seattle Prep. In 1931, Seattle University and Seattle Prep split off from each other and Seattle University moved back to its original First Hill location.

== Mission ==
As a Jesuit school, Seattle Prep's mission is focused on building men and women for and with others. At graduation, students are meant to embody the five grad at grads (graduate at graduation): open to growth, intellectually competent, spiritually alive, loving, and committed to justice. Students are formed into transformational leaders under Jesuit values and ideals.

== Curriculum ==
Students generally pursue a traditional four-year course of study at Seattle Prep and then pursue other arrangements (entrance into a four-year college, or a two-year college).

=== Arts ===
After a first year of Music, Drama, Visual Art, and Media Literacy, students can pick their art courses for the following three years. Some courses offered are: Choir, Filmmaking, Acting, Music Ensemble, Drawing, Printmaking, Photography, Ceramics and AP Studio Art.

=== Math ===
After taking an algebra placement test, freshmen are placed in various classes depending on their scores: Intermediate Algebra, Geometry, Honors Geometry, Algebra 2/Trigonometry, and Honors Algebra 2/Trigonometry.

Depending on the student's performance in the first semester, they are recommended classes for their sophomore year, which include: Geometry, Honors Geometry, Algebra 2, Algebra 2/Trigonometry, Honors Algebra 2/Trigonometry, Precalculus and Honors Precalculus.

This process continues for the rest of the curriculum. Juniors can take: Algebra 2, Algebra 2/Trigonometry, Honors Algebra 2/Trigonometry, Introduction to Precalculus, Precalculus, Honors Precalculus, Calculus, AP Calculus AB, and AP Calculus BC.

Seniors may take Introduction to Precalculus, Precalculus, Honors Precalculus, Calculus, AP Calculus AB, AP Calculus BC, Multivariable Calculus and AP Statistics.

=== Science ===
Freshmen are placed in Biology or Honors Biology depending on their scores on the HSPT (High School Placement Test) and the school's math placement test. Sophomores are put in either Honors Chemistry, Accelerated Chemistry, or Chemistry. Depending on the classes they took previously, juniors may take Physics, AP Physics 1, AP Physics C (must be taken in conjunction with or after taking a Calculus class), AP Environmental Science, AP Biology, and AP Chemistry. Seniors can take Anatomy & Physiology, AP Environmental Science, AP Biology, AP Chemistry, physics, AP Physics 1, or AP Physics C (must be taken in conjunction with or after taking a Calculus class).

=== Extracurricular activities ===
Extracurricular activities include Film Club, Chess Team, Mock Trial, Dance Team (known as Pulse), Yearbook, Newspaper, ASB, and Drama Club. Prep also has various social justice clubs, including Global Justice Coalition, Environmental Alliance, Feminist Interest Group (FIG), One Voice, Asian Pacific Islanders Club (APIC), Black Student Union (BSU) and Latino Club.

Criteria for admissions include grades, extracurricular activities, an entrance exam, reference letters, and essays.

== Facts and figures ==
Facts and figures (as of 2008 unless otherwise noted):

- Enrollment: 787 (2025-2026)
- Faculty: 135 (2025)
- Faculty with advanced degrees: 90%
- Student/teacher ratio: 11:1
- Average class Size: 22
- Percentage of college-bound graduates: 100%
- Tuition: $28,600 + $650 application fee
- Library volumes: 20,000+
- Tuition assistance: $3.3M USD

== Magis Christian Service ==
Seattle Prep has a four-year requirement of various community service. The four-year Magis Christian Service Program at Seattle Prep exposes students to many different forms of service including service to family (freshman), to school (sophomore), to the poor and marginalized (junior), and to leadership for justice (senior).

== Physical structure ==
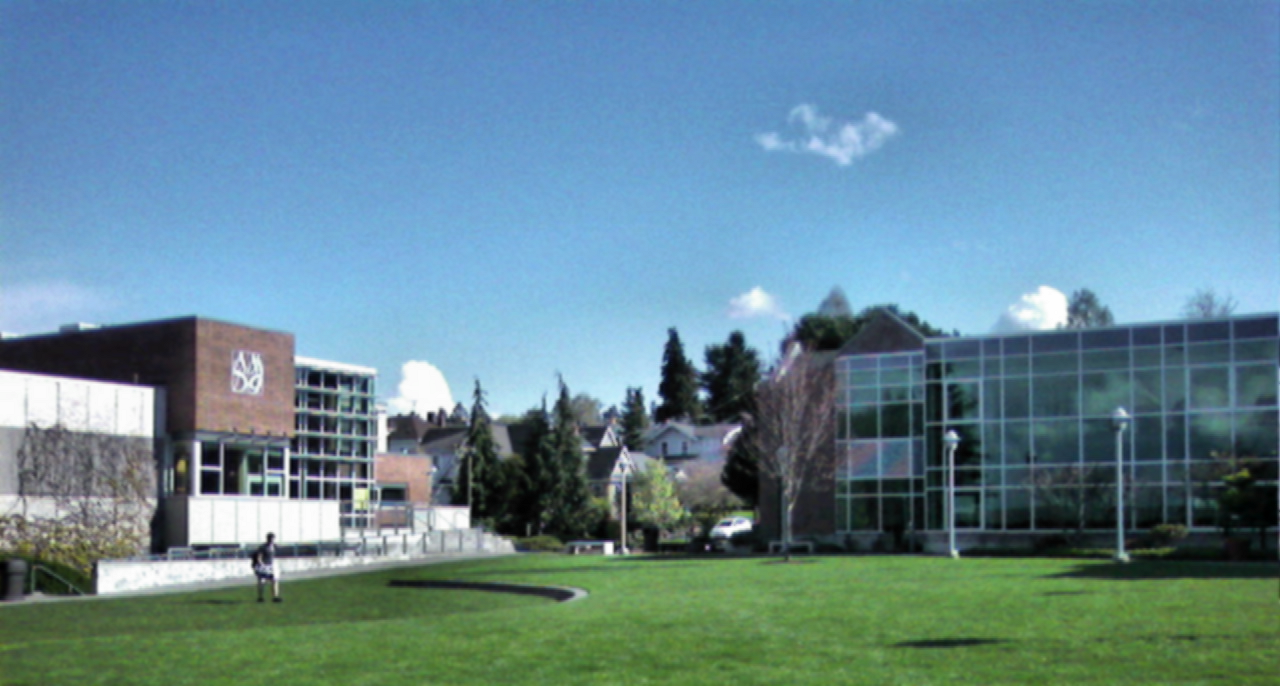
McHugh Gymnasium & St. Ignatius Hall

In the 1950s, McDonnell Hall was added to the existing Adelphia Hall (the name of which refers to Adelphia College, previously on the site). In 1967, Peyton Hall was added across the parking lot from McDonnell and Adelphia Halls. The McHugh Gymnasium was built in front of Adelphia Hall and opened in 1983, a result of the school's first major fundraising campaign. Funds from this campaign were used to remodel the third floor of Adelphia Hall for improved science facilities. During this time the library, which then became known as Loyola Library, was moved to Peyton Hall.

There were several major additions to Seattle Prep in the late 1990s. A new underground parking garage was built to replace the old parking lot, which was replaced by a grass quad. In addition, St. Ignatius Hall was erected across from Peyton and McDonnell Halls.

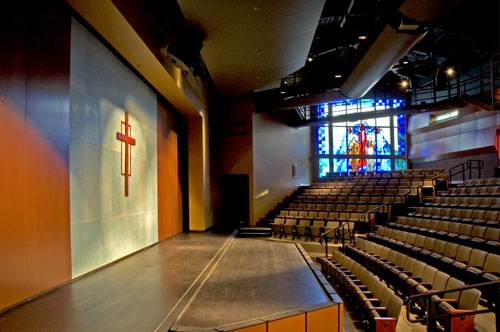
Thomas Healy SJ Theater

In 2007, the PACCAR Commons (Donated by the Pigott family) were completed, including new office space with reception desks and also a sick room. Also construction was completed on the Thomas Healy, S.J., Theater and Classrooms. This was the first major renovation since the addition of St. Ignatius Hall. The theater, which also accommodates school Masses, features an orchestra pit with hydraulics moving it up and down for various uses, including the transportation of heavy equipment. The workout rooms and locker rooms were also altered in this remodel. The space below the theater is used for arts classes, a sacristy (to be used for liturgies and masses), and weight/workout rooms. In 2008, sections of pathway around the campus plaza were redone and electronic doors were installed on several major entrances.

== Athletics and activities ==
Seattle Prep has won numerous league and state titles in many different men's sports. As of 2010, by size Prep is a high-end 1A class school, but plays up in 3A classification.

The boys' soccer team are back-to-back state champions (2011 and 2012), and have four other appearances in the state championship game. The team qualified for State 14 years in a row, winning it all in 2002. Prep's volleyball team won three straight state titles from 2001 to 2003, and returned to the champions circle in 2010.

The boys' basketball team won state titles in 2000 and 2006 and narrowly missed another title in 2012, losing in the state championship game. The team has qualified for State in six of the last seven seasons.

The boys' cross country team won the state title in 1966 (led by future 4th-place finisher in the Montreal Olympics marathon Don Kardong), 1972, and 2000. Prep's boys' cross country teams finished as one of the top five 3A teams every year but one from 1996 to 2013. During that span, Prep never placed lower than second in the Metro League. In 2006, Prep won its first women's Metro League team title.

The boys' lacrosse team won the Washington High School Boys Lacrosse Association, Division II state championship in 2002, and has made it to the championship game in multiple years.

The Mock Trial program boasts one national championship and 14 state titles over the past 18 years (winning State in 2003, 2004, 2007, 2008, 2009, 2010, 2011, 2012, 2013, 2014, 2015, 2016, 2017, and 2021). Prep placed in the top 10 at the National High School Mock Trial Championship eight times during that span. Its 3rd-place finish in 2009 was the best in program history, until the program won the national title in 2014.

The Prep Chess Team has played in the Washington High School State Team Championship in each of the past 17 years. Its highest finishes were 2nd (2002), 3rd (2009), 5th (2005 and 2010), and 6th (1999). In 1999, they also won the Metro Championship.

== Notable alumni ==
- Bob Bellinger, American football player
- Stuart Fairchild, MLB player
- Bryce Fisher, former NFL defensive lineman (1999–2008)
- Bea Franklin, soccer player
- Tom Gorman, former professional tennis player
- Spencer Hawes, former professional NBA basketball player
- Sam Hiatt, NWSL professional soccer player
- Don Kardong, Olympic marathon runner
- Amanda Knox, convicted of murdering a fellow student in Italy, conviction later overturned
- Joe Lombardi, NFL offensive coordinator, Denver Broncos
- Mike McGavick, former CEO of Safeco and former Republican candidate for the United States Senate
- John McKay, former US Attorney for the Western District Of Washington
- Greg Nickels, former mayor of Seattle (2002–2010)
- Braeden Smith, basketball player for the Gonzaga Bulldogs
- John Spellman, former governor of Washington (1981–1985)
- Martell Webster, former professional NBA basketball player
