= Delfi =

Delfi may refer to

- Delfi (web portal), internet portal in Estonia, Latvia, and Lithuania
- Delfi (chess), chess engine
- Delfi bookstores, a chain of bookstores in Serbia
- Delfi Limited, a Singaporean confectionery company

== People ==
=== Fictional Characters ===
- Delfina "Delfi" Alzamendi, from the Disney Channel telenovela series, Soy Luna

== See also ==
- Delphi (disambiguation)
- Delfi-C3, a CubeSat satellite constructed by students at the Delft University of Technology
- Delfi-n3Xt, a Dutch nanosatellite which is operated by Delft University of Technology
- Delfi AS v. Estonia, a 2015 European Court of Human Rights case
