= Elasmopalpus corrientellus =

Scientific classification
- Domain: Eukaryota
- Kingdom: Animalia
- Phylum: Arthropoda
- Class: Insecta
- Order: Lepidoptera
- Family: Pyralidae
- Subfamily: Phycitinae
- Genus: Elasmopalpus
- Species: E. corrientellus

Binomial name
- Elasmopalpus corrientellus Ragonot, 1888

Species of moth

Elasmopalpus corrientellus is a species of snout moths in the diverse subfamily Phycitinae. It was described by Émile Louis Ragonot in 1888 from a female specimen collected in the eponymous city of Corrientes in Northern Argentina. The species is considered misplaced in Elasmopalpus, but it is currently not clear to which genus it should be transferred.
