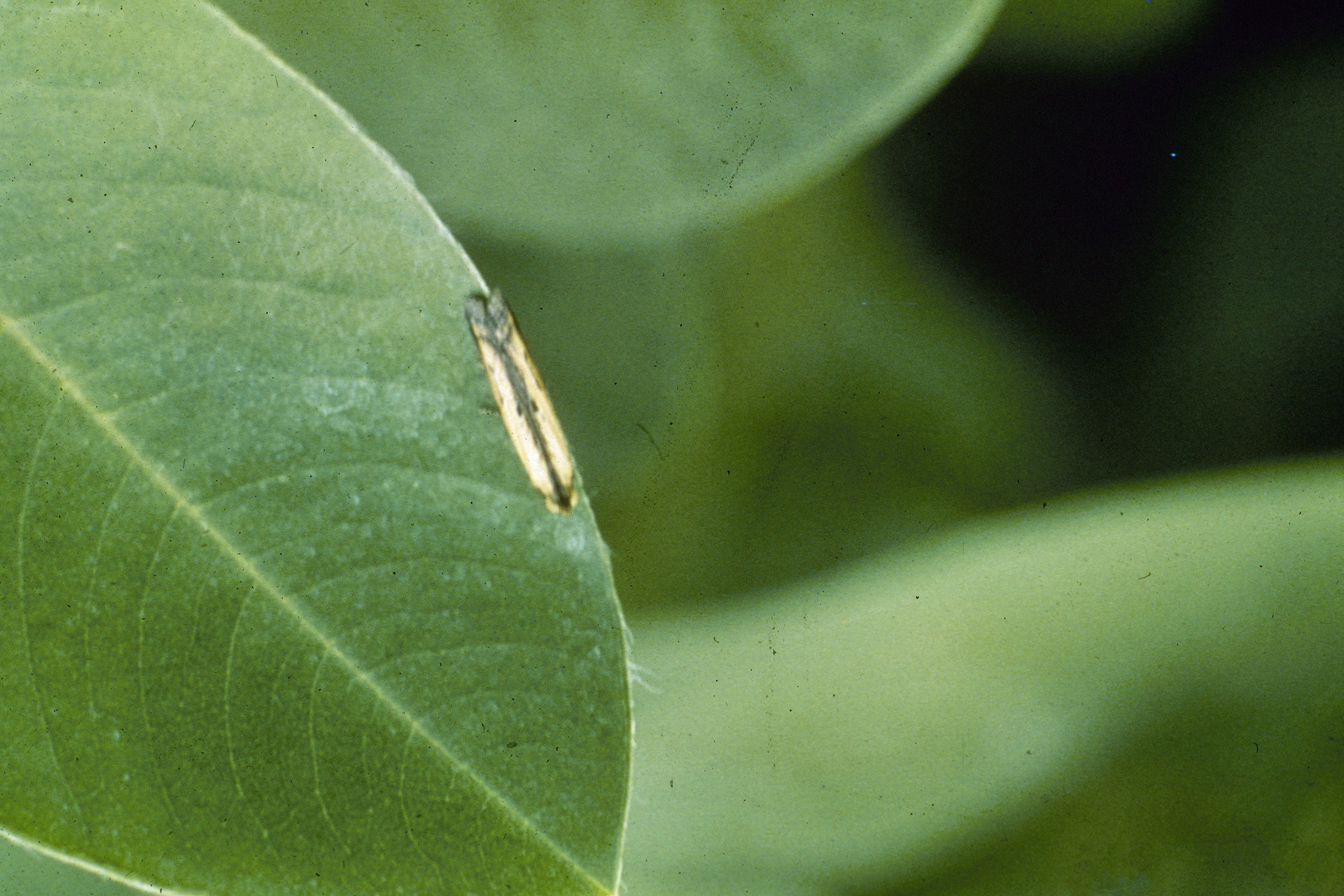
- Adult male
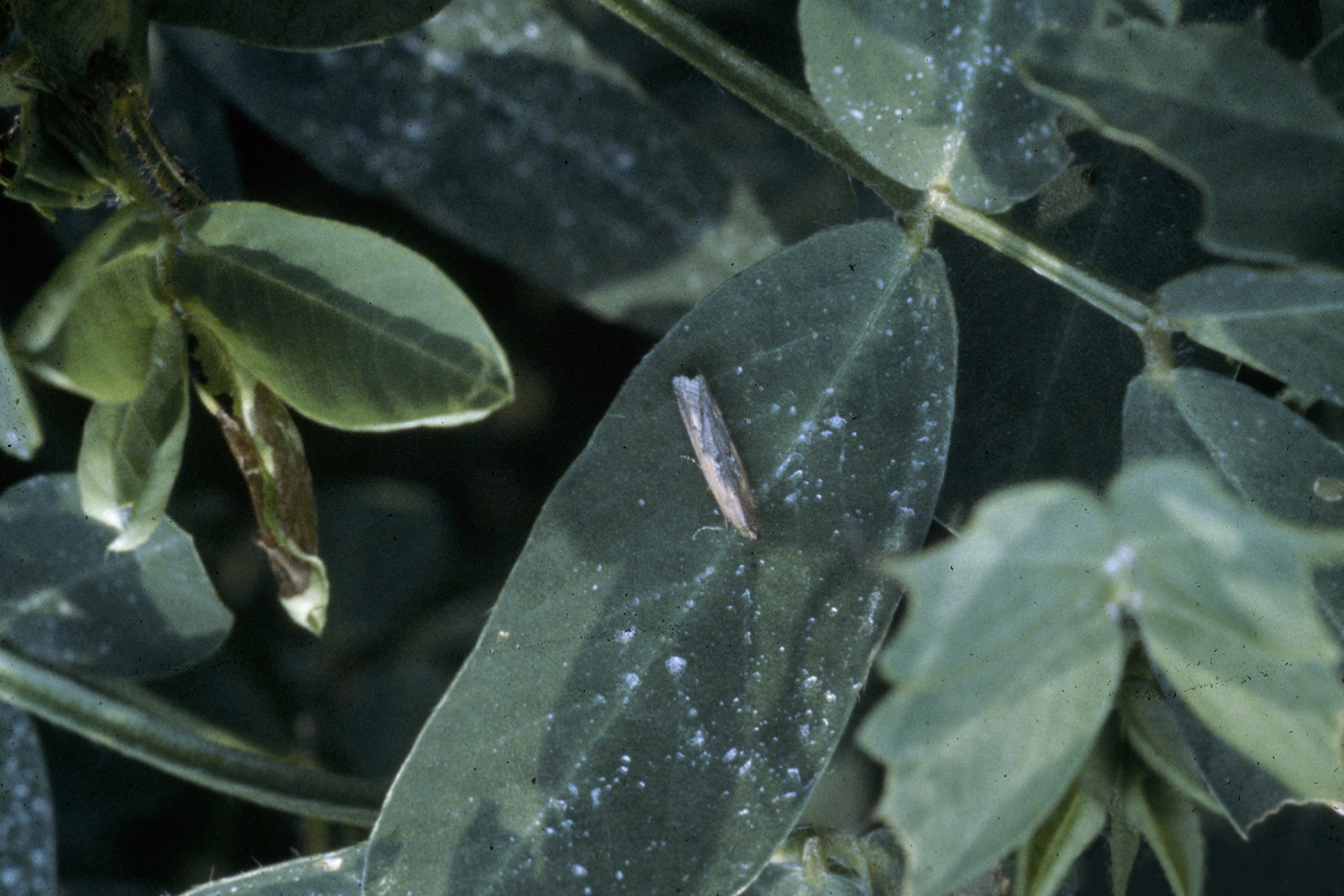
- Adult female

Scientific classification
- Kingdom: Animalia
- Phylum: Arthropoda
- Clade: Pancrustacea
- Class: Insecta
- Order: Lepidoptera
- Family: Pyralidae
- Subfamily: Phycitinae
- Genus: Elasmopalpus
- Species: E. lignosellus

Binomial name
- Elasmopalpus lignosellus (Zeller, 1848)

Synonyms
- Elasmopalpus lignosella; Pempelia lignosella Zeller, 1848; Pempelia tartarella Zeller, 1872; Pempelia tartarellus; Dasypyga carbonella Hulst, 1888; Dasypyga carbonellus; Pempelia incautella Zeller, 1872; Elasmopalpus incautellus; Pempelia lignosellus var. major Zeller, 1874; Elasmopalpus anthracellus Ragonot, 1888; Elasmopalpus puer Dyar, 1919

= Elasmopalpus lignosellus =

Species of insect

Elasmopalpus lignosellus, the lesser cornstalk borer, was described by Philipp Christoph Zeller in 1848. It is found from the southern United States to Mexico, Central America and South America (Colombia, Venezuela, Brazil, Peru, Argentina and Chile). It is also found on the Bahamas.

The wingspan is 17–25 mm. Adults are generally brownish with narrow and elongate forewings with oblique distal margins. The forewings are yellow ocher to light brown in males and dark brown in females. The hindwings are whitish with gray to brown anterior and distal margins.

The larvae feed on a wide range of plants but prefer grasses. Recorded host plants include a number of economically important plants such as Phaseolus vulgaris, Beta vulgaris, Brassica oleracea var. capitata, Cucumis melo, Cyperus esculentus, Zea mays, Vigna unguiculata, Phaseolus lunatus, Avena sativa, Pisum sativum, Arachis hypogaea, Capsicum annuum, Oryza sativa, Secale cereale, Sorghum bicolor, Glycine max, Sorghum sudanense, Saccharum officinarum, Ipomoea batatas, Lycopersicon esculentum, Brassica rapa and Triticum aestivum.

They tunnel into the crown of their host plant, severely weakening large plants and often killing young seedlings. They spin silken tubes near the soil surface for protection. On peanuts, they will feed on any portion of the plant that contacts the soil. The species overwinters as a larva or pupa in the soil.

== Gallery ==
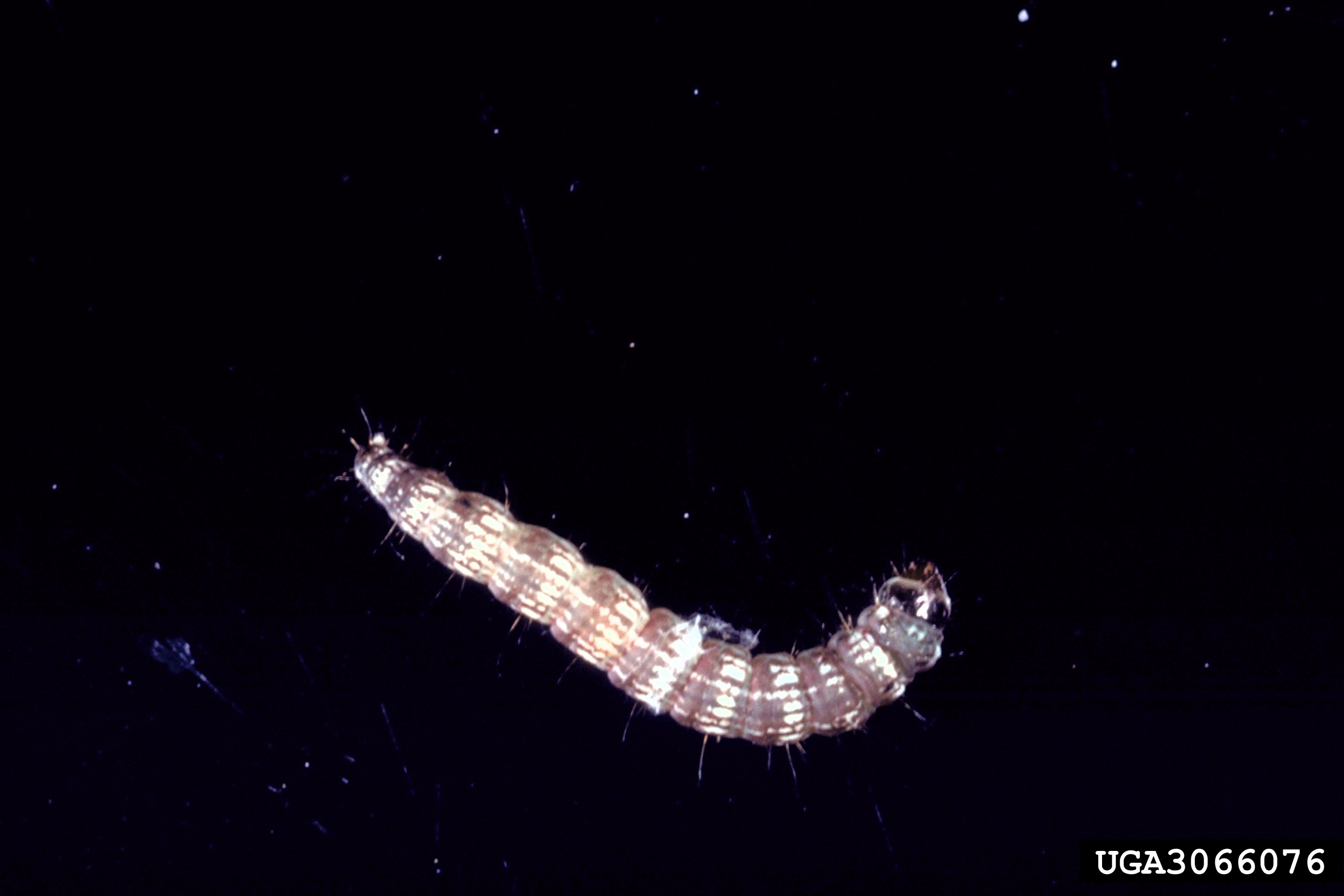
Larva

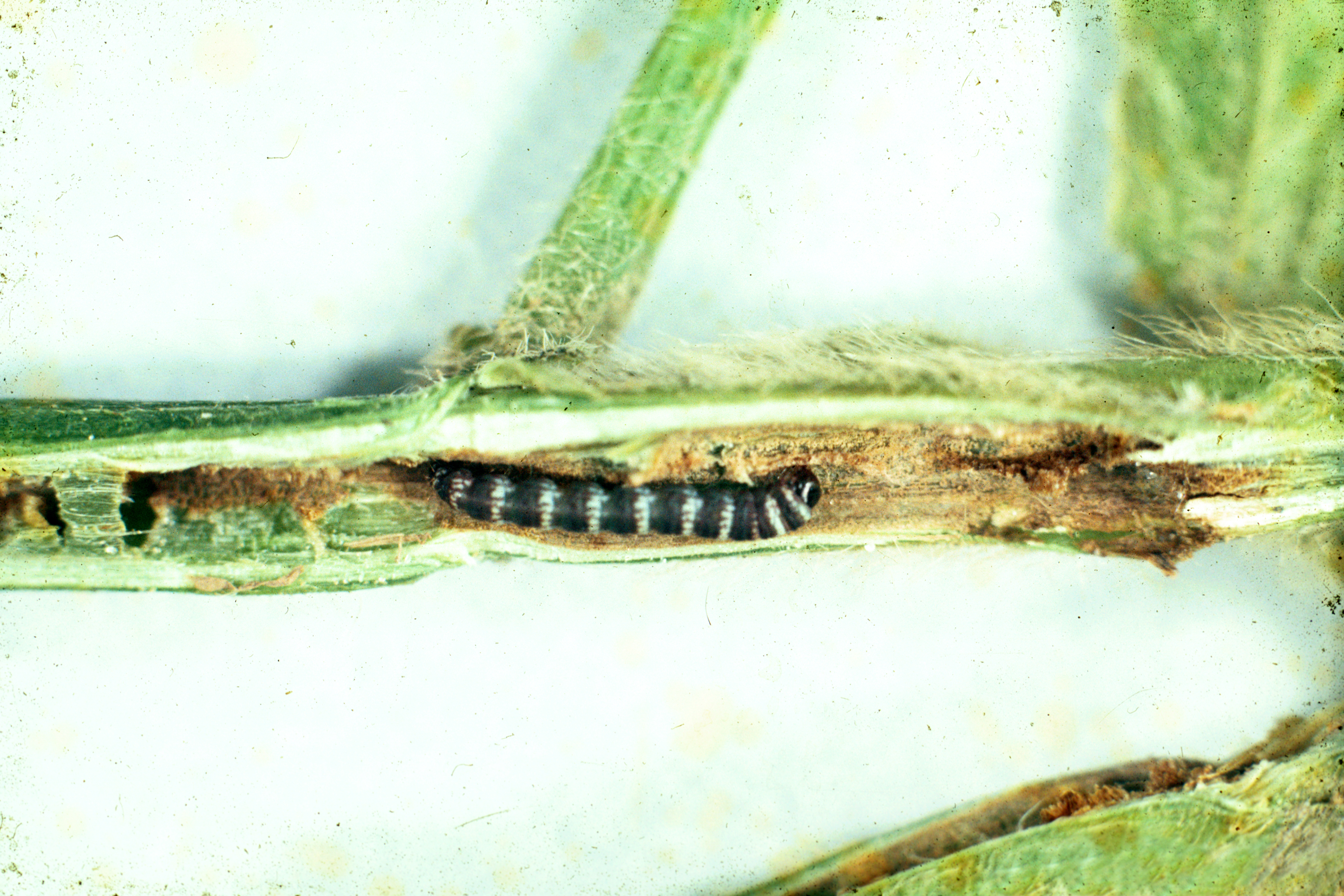
Larva

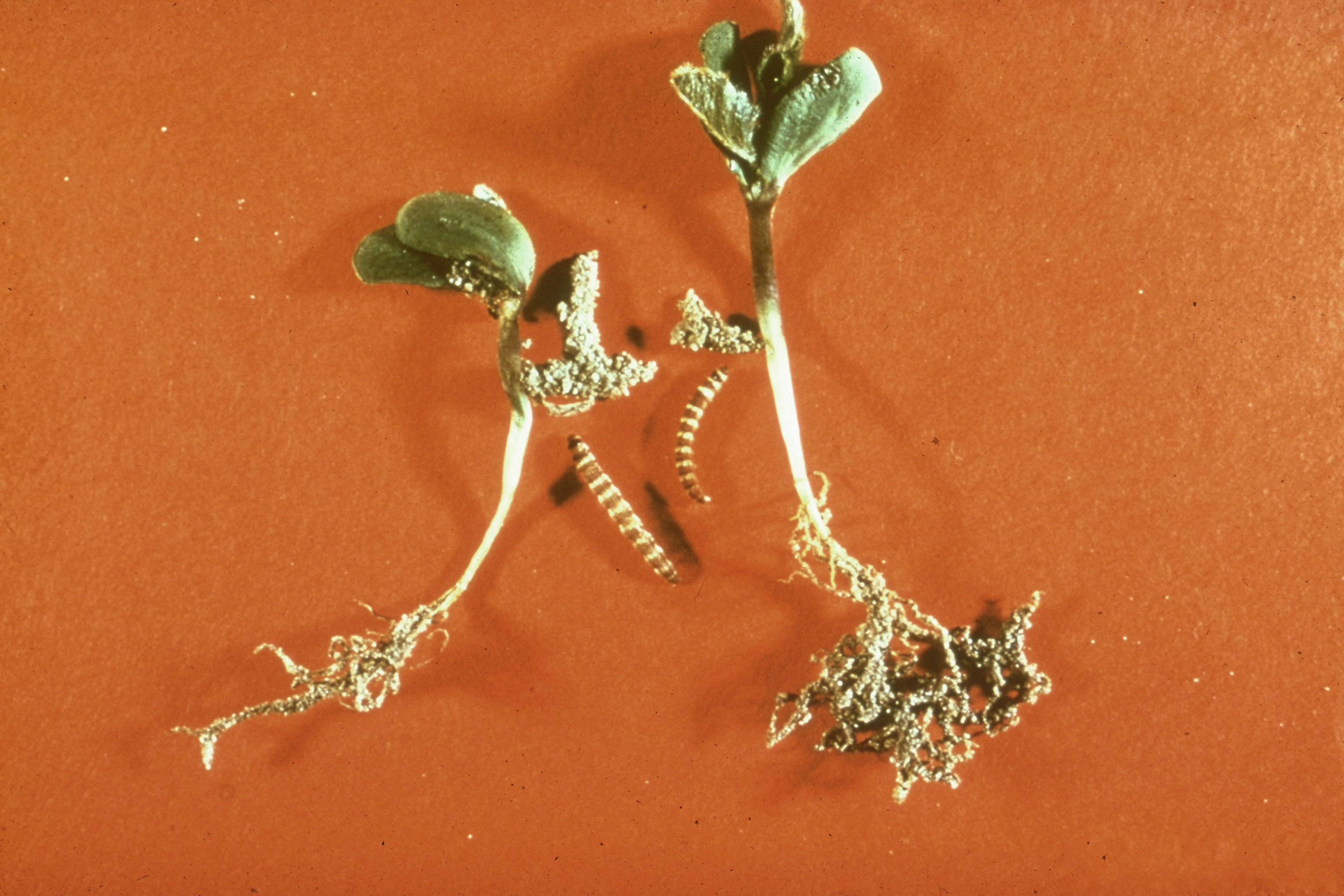
Damage

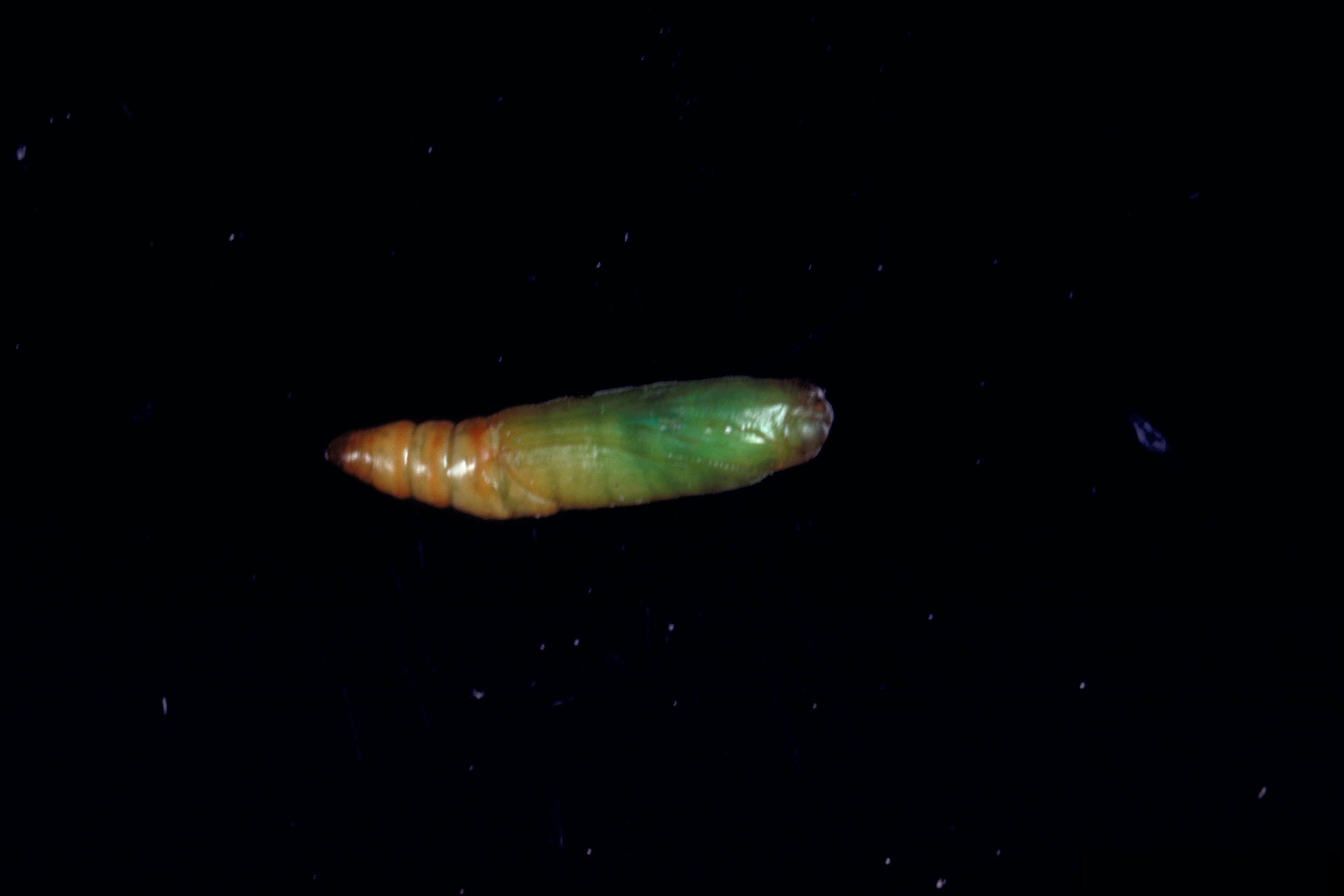
Pupa
