= Sarcophagus of Adelphia =

Christian sarcophagus c. 340 AD

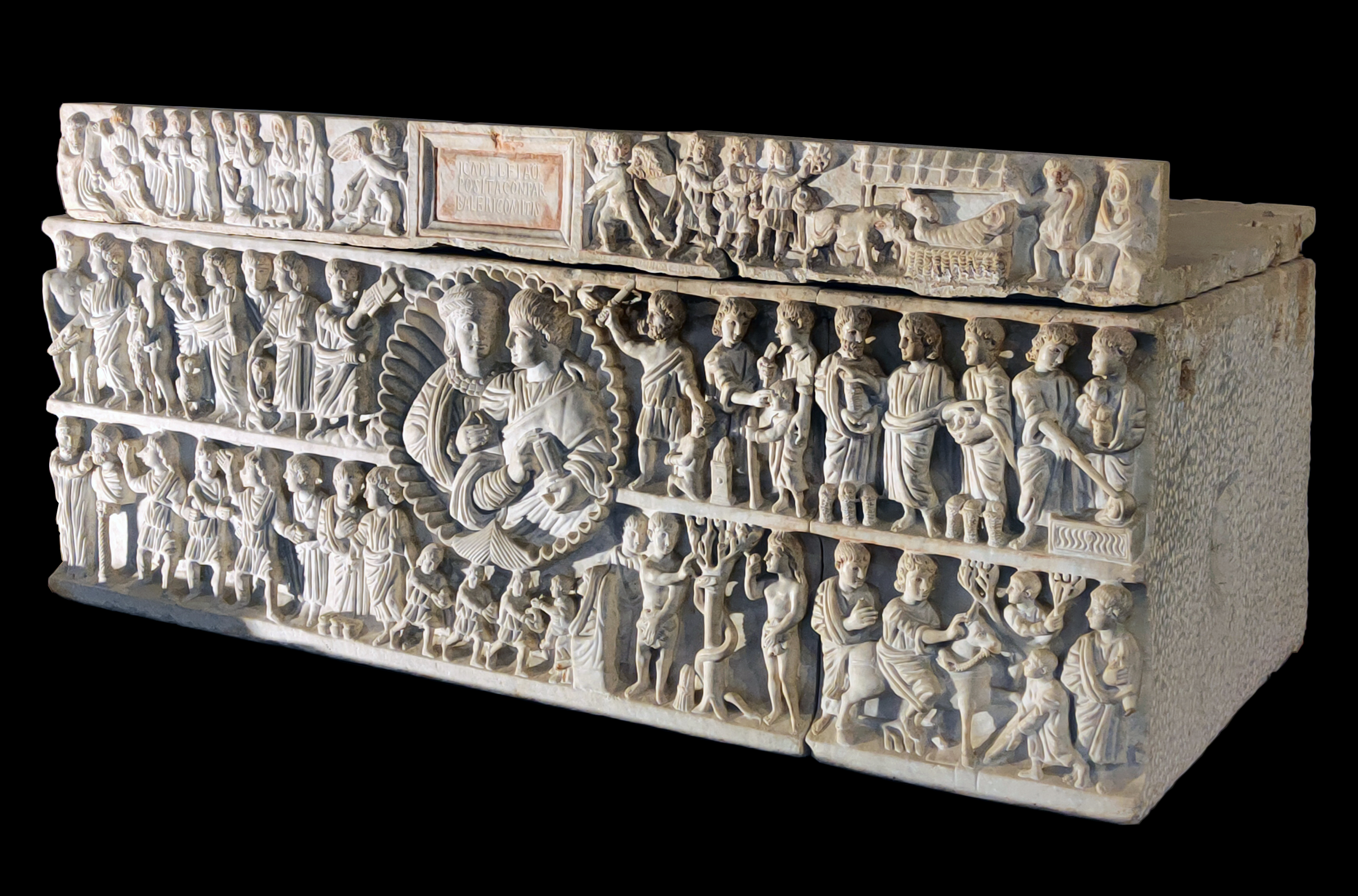
Sarcophagus of Adelphia

The Sarcophagus of Adelphia is an early Christian, circa 340 AD sarcophagus now in the Museo Archeologico Regionale Paolo Orsi in Syracuse, region of Sicily, Italy. The sarcophagus was found in the Rotunda of Adelphia inside the Catacombs of San Giovanni, in Siracusa. The iconography displayed has similarities to the layout of the Dogmatic and Junius Bassus sarcophagi, although the quality of to depictions is simplified.

== Description ==
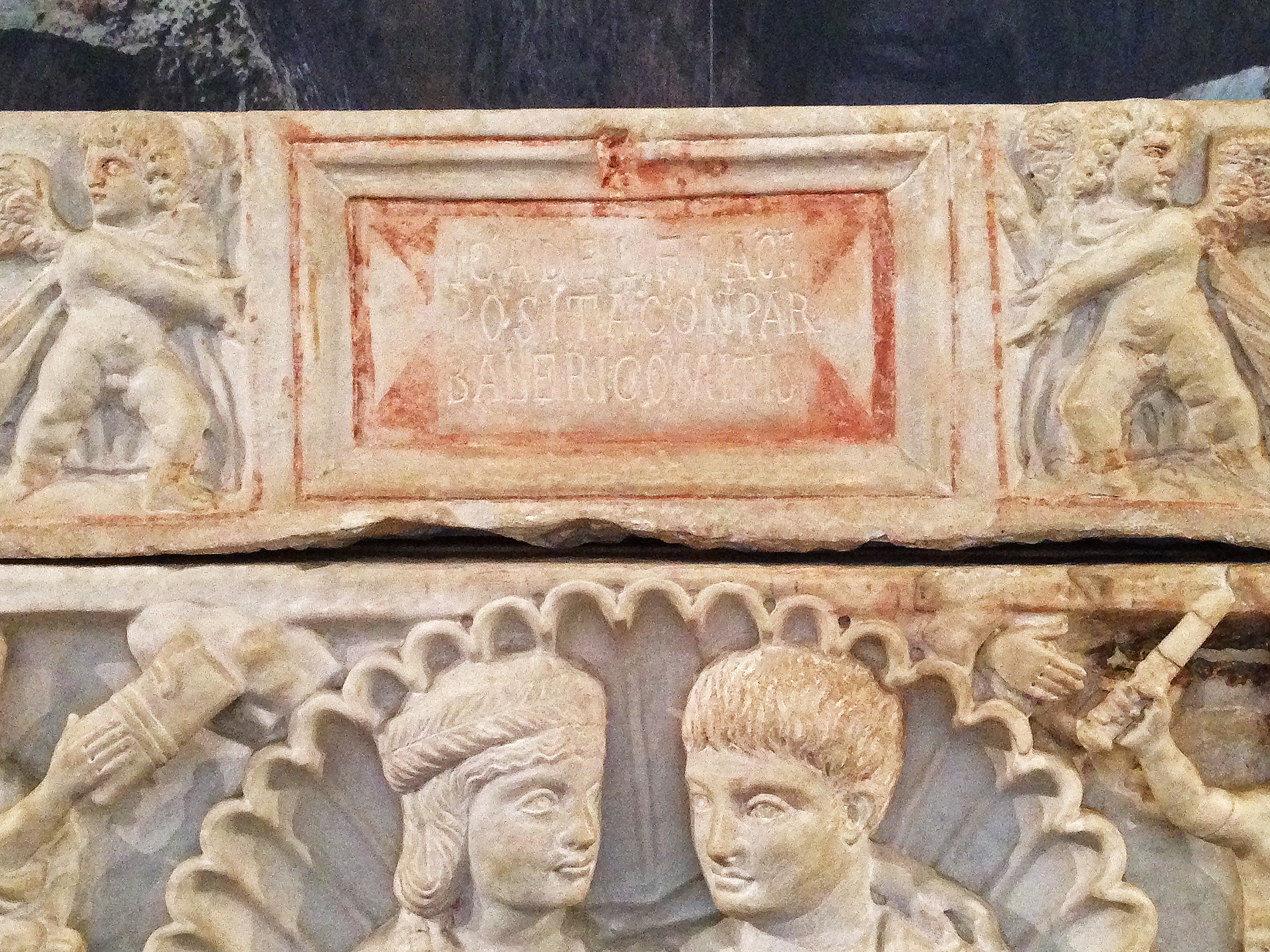
Detail of inscription

The name of the sarcophagus derives from the hypothesis that it was used for the burial of the Roman noblewoman Adelfia. The central medallion would represent a portrait of the couple, mentioned in the center of the lid by an epigraph arranged on three lines in a tabula ansata on a red background:

 (H)IC ADELFIA C(LARISSIMA) F(EMINA)

 POSITA CONPAR

 BALERI COMITIS

Here lies Adelphia, famous woman, wife of Count Valerius.

The front side of the marble sarcophagus is split into two registers, typical of the style of the time, with both Old Testament and New Testament subjects and a central shell-shaped clipeus containing the portraits of the dead couple, embracing. The lid of the sarcophagus forms a third register. Of note, the depictions of Moses and Jesus, and perhaps God in Eden, are unbearded, as opposed to the bearded Abraham. The scenes are depicted in a high bas relief. The scenes do not follow a timeline, and can be poorly distinct from one another.

In the upper lid are likely four episodes, two likely regarding the life of Mary on the left, and two depicting events surrounding the Nativity, including the three Magi following the star of Bethlehem. It also contains a plaque identifying Adelphia and her spouse Valerius. The second register has eight episodes, four on each side of the central shell with the married couple. On the left, from left to right, are scenes depicting:

- Work imposed on Adam and Eve
- Denial of Peter with the cockerel
- Jesus healing the bleeding woman
- Moses receives tablets

On the right are scenes depicting

- Abraham and Isaac
- Christ heals the blind
- Miracle of Multiplication of the loaves
- Raising of the son of the widow of Nain

In the third (lowest) register, are scenes depicting:

- Shadrach, Meshach, and Abednego refuse pagan worship
- Miracle at the Marriage at Cana
- Adoration of the Magi
- Adam, Eve, and the Serpent in the Tree of the Knowledge of Good and Evil
- Jesus enters Jerusalem

== Adelphia and Valerius ==
According to the inscription, Adelphia was the wife of a Count Valerius. According to recent studies, Valerius was the friend of St. Augustine cited in the Introduction of the De nuptiis et concupiscentia (“About marriage and lust”).
