= Adelphi Building =

Historic building in British Columbia, Canada

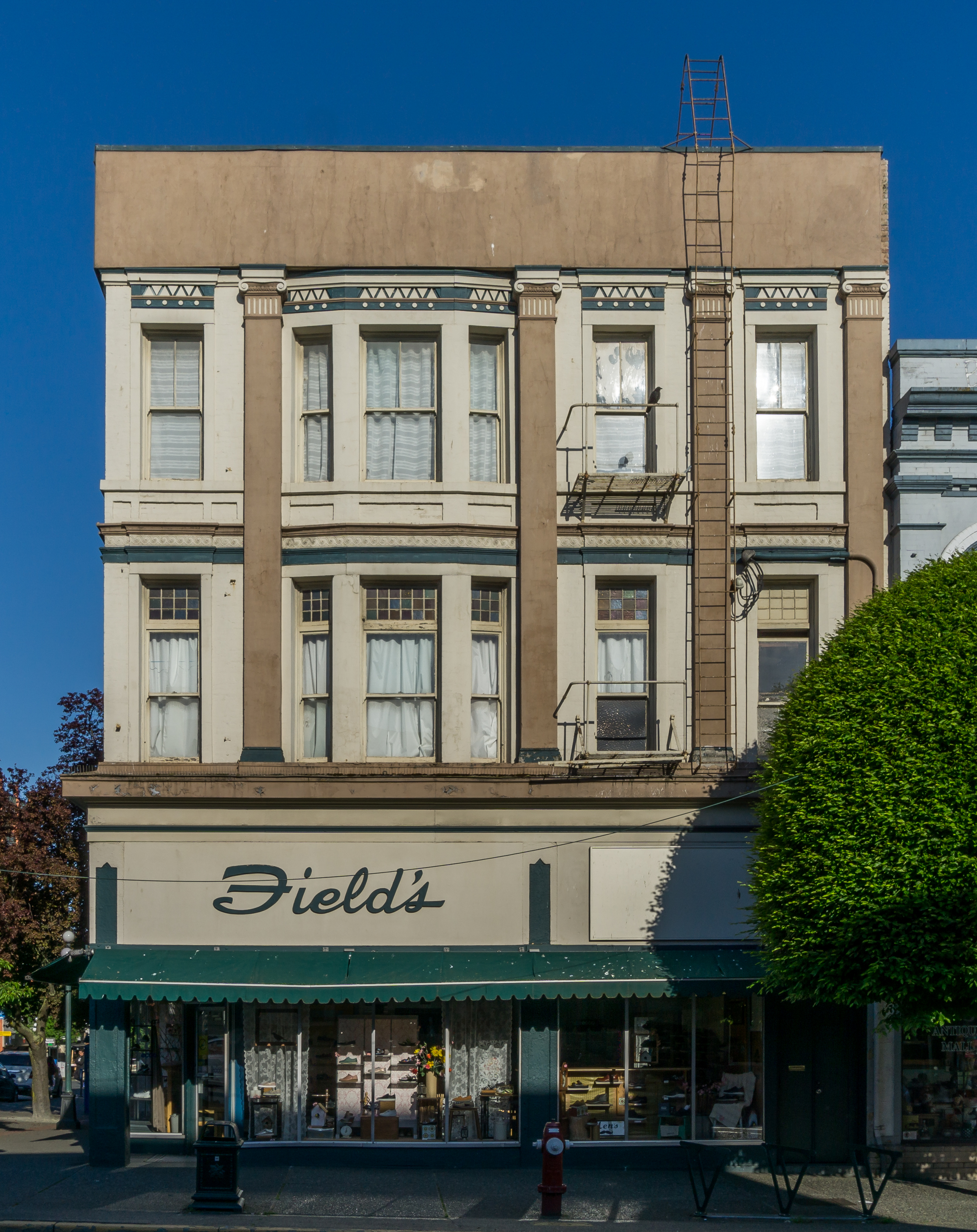
- The building's exterior in 2018
- Interactive map of the Adelphi Building area

General information
- Location: 1300-1304 Government Street, Victoria, British Columbia, Canada
- Coordinates: 48.4268°N 123.3676°W
- Current tenants: Field's Shoes
- Completed: 1891

The Adelphi Building is an historic building in Victoria, British Columbia, Canada. It is located on the northwest corner of Government and Yates Streets.

== See also ==
- List of historic places in Victoria, British Columbia
