= Pseudadelphia =

Scientific classification
- Domain: Eukaryota
- Kingdom: Animalia
- Phylum: Arthropoda
- Class: Insecta
- Order: Lepidoptera
- Family: Pyralidae
- Subfamily: Phycitinae
- Genus: Pseudadelphia; Neunzig, 2003

Genus of moths

Pseudadelphia is a genus of snout moths in the subfamily Phycitinae.

== Species ==
- Pseudadelphia ochripunctella (Dyar, 1908)
