= Adelphi, Iowa =

- unincorporated community
- Location within Iowa
- Coordinates: 41°32′00″N 93°25′35″W
- Country: United States
- State: Iowa
- Elevation: 866 ft (264 m)
- Time zone: UTC-6 (Central (CST))
  - Summer (DST): UTC-5 (CDT)
- GNIS feature ID: 464439

Adelphi is an unincorporated community in Polk County, in the U.S. state of Iowa.

== History ==
Adelphi was platted on April 6, 1857, in Camp Township. No railroad line was built to the community, inhibiting its growth, and leaving it as what one 1876 Polk County historian called a village. Adelphi's post office was established in 1856.

The community's population was 12 in 1900, and 65 in 1920.

In 1935, Adelphi's post office closed. Mail was to be routed through Runnells. The Altoona Herald observed, "Adelphi's loss is Runnells' gain".

Adelphi's population was 40 in 1940.
