= USNS Adelphi =

History

United States
- Name: SS Adelphi Victory
- Builder: Permanente Metals Yard No. 2, Richmond, California
- Laid down: 22 April 1945
- Launched: 2 June 1945
- In service: 27 June 1945
- Out of service: 1984
- Identification: IMO number: 5002613
- Fate: 1993 scrapped in China

General characteristics
- Type: Type VC2-S-AP2 Victory ship
- Displacement: 4,512 long tons (4,584 t) light; 15,589 long tons (15,839 t) full load
- Length: 455 ft (139 m)
- Beam: 62 ft (19 m)
- Draft: 29 ft (8.8 m)
- Propulsion: Cross-compound steam turbine; 8,500 shp (6,338 kW); Single screw
- Speed: 15.5 knots (28.7 km/h; 17.8 mph)

USNS Adelphi (T-AG-181) was one of 12 ships scheduled to be acquired by the United States Navy in February 1966 and converted into Forward Depot Ships for service with the Military Sea Transport Service. The SS Adelphi Victory (MCV-760) was chosen for this conversion and assigned the name Adelphi, but the program was cancelled and the ships were not acquired by the Navy. She was built under the Emergency Shipbuilding program for World War II.

For post World War II work she was operated by Marine Transport Line of San Francisco. After her post war duties in 1947 she was laid up in the National Defense Reserve Fleet, in the James River. In 1966 she was removed from the Reserve Fleet and reactivated for the Vietnam War. The ship operated under commercial charter carrying supplies to Vietnam under her original name, SS Adelphi Victory. In 1973 the SS Adelphi Victory was laid up in Suisun Bay, California, as part of the National Defense Reserve Fleet. In 1993 she was scrapped in China.
