= Adelphia College =

College in Seattle, Washington, U.S.

Coordinates: 47.641387°N 122.317531°W

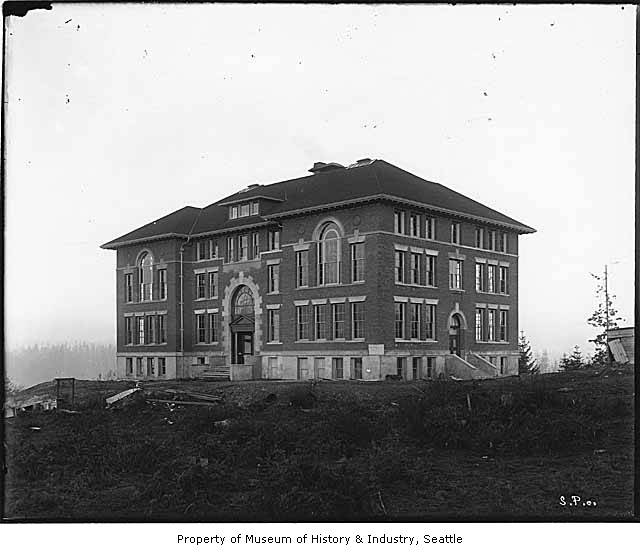
Adelphia College was built in 1905 in the Interlaken area of north Capitol Hill. It was administered by the Swedish Baptist Church. In 1919 the campus was acquired by Seattle College (which later became Seattle University), and in 1930 this site became Seattle Preparatory School.

Adelphia College was a Swedish-American college in Seattle, Washington, run by the Swedish Baptist Church. The institution opened in 1905, but went bankrupt in 1918 or 1919.

In 1919, the main building and campus were sold to the Jesuit Seattle College (the later Seattle University); the campus has since 1930 been used by a related Jesuit institution, the Seattle Preparatory School.

The remaining archives of the college are kept in the Swenson Center at Augustana College (Illinois).

Adelphia Bible College In 2011 the school reopened at Lake Retreat Camp and Conference Center in Ravensdale Washington as Adelphia Bible College (also known as Adelphia Bible School). Lake Retreat Camp is part of Converge Northwest Swedish Baptist Church. The Bible school provides intentional, focused time exploring a student's strengths, identifying gifts and abilities, developing vital life skills, and equipping for faith and mission. Adelphia graduates may pursue further education at a university, some will enter the workforce, and many will devote their time in volunteer or vocational ministry.
