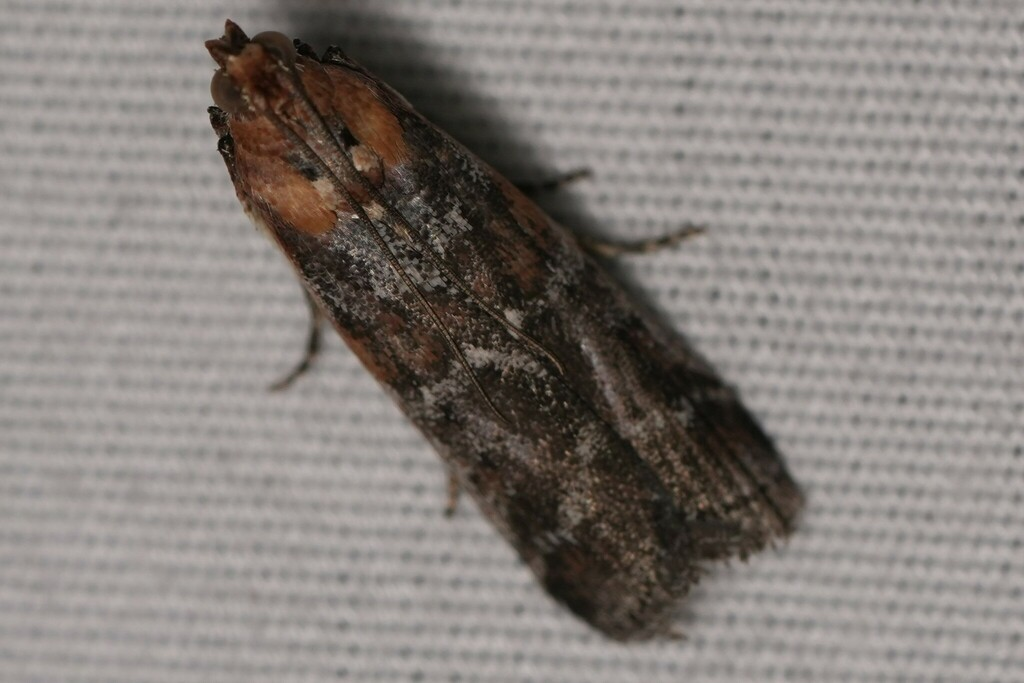

Scientific classification
- Kingdom: Animalia
- Phylum: Arthropoda
- Clade: Pancrustacea
- Class: Insecta
- Order: Lepidoptera
- Family: Pyralidae
- Subfamily: Phycitinae
- Genus: Adelphia; Heinrich, 1956

Synonyms
- Pempelia petrella Zeller, 1846; Adelphia rubiginella (Walker, 1863); Adelphia rufinalis (Walker, 1863); Adelphia hapsella (Hulst, 1887)

= Adelphia (moth) =

Genus of moths

Adelphia is a monotypic snout moth genus in the subfamily Phycitinae. It was described by Carl Heinrich in 1956. Its only species is Adelphia petrella, which was originally described as Pempelia petrella by Philipp Christoph Zeller in 1846. It is found in North America, from New Jersey to Florida and westward to Iowa and Texas.

Another species, Adelphia ochripunctella, was formerly included in this genus, but is now placed in the genus Pseudadelphia.
