= Antonio Branciforte, 1st Prince of Scordia =

Italian noble (died 1658)

Antonio Branciforte, 1st Prince of Scordia (c. 1597 – 9 April 1658) was an Italian aristocrat.

== Early life ==
Antonio Branciforte was born in Palermo, Italy in c. 1597. He was the son of Ercole Branciforte, 1st Duke of San Giovanni (c. 1550–1616), and, his second wife, Agata Lanza (b. 1568). Among his siblings were younger brothers Ottavio Branciforte, who was Bishop of Cefalù and Bishop of Catania, and Luigi Branciforte, who was Bishop of Melfi e Rapolla. From his mother's previous marriage to Giuseppe Branciforte, 5th Count of Raccuja, his elder half-brother was Niccolò Branciforte, who was created 1st Prince of Leonforte in 1622. From his father's previous marriage to Isabella Tagliavia d'Aragona (a daughter of Carlo d'Aragona Tagliavia, 1st Prince of Castelvetrano, 2nd Duke of Terranova), another elder half-brother was Girolamo Branciforte, 2nd Duke of San Giovanni.

His paternal grandparents were Girolamo Branciforte, 6th Count of Cammarata, and Ippolita Settimo. (Note: After his grandfather's death, his grandmother married Giuseppe Francesco Landriani and had Vittoria Landriani (wife of Tommaso di Carpegna, Count of Carpegna).) His maternal grandparents were Ottavio Lanza, 1st Prince of Trabia, 2nd Count of Mussomeli, and Giovanna Orteca Gioeni, Baroness of Valcorrente and Pietratagliata.

== Career ==
On 21 May 1625 in Spain, the King of Sicily Philip IV, granted Branciforte, his heirs and successors, the title of Count of Sant'Antonio, on the territory of Sant'Antonio, located in Val di Mazara. He was also created the 1st Marquess of Martini in 1645.

Branciforte is credited with the modern resettlement of Scordia. (Note: Today, Scordia is a comune (municipality) in the Metropolitan City of Catania in the Italian region Sicily, located about 160 kilometres (99 mi) southeast of Palermo and about 30 kilometres (19 mi) southwest of Catania.) He obtained the licentia populandi from Philip IV, in 1628 and was created 1st Prince of Scordia. He was able to promote the rebirth of the village, laying the foundations for future demographic and urban growth. The Branciforte family governed Scordia until the abolition of feudalism (Sicilian Constitution of 1812). Following the suppression of the Kingdom of Sicily and its incorporation into the Kingdom of the Two Sicilies in 1816, and the subsequent administrative reform of 1819, Scordia, until then a hamlet of Militello, obtained municipal autonomy.

At the urging of his brother, Bishop Ottavio Branciforte, he established the Church of Sant'Antonio al Convento (Chiesa di Sant'Antonio al Convento) in Scordia. Ottavio's half-bust is placed in the tympanum of the church's entrance. Antonio and his wife, Giuseppina, and some of their descendants are buried in this church.

During the session of 16 June 1633, Branciforte was elected Deputy of the Kingdom.

== Personal life ==
In 1625, he married Giuseppa Campulo Blaschis (c. 1590–1657), which brought him the fief and Barony of Scordia Sottana. Giuseppina was a daughter of Francesco Campulo, Baron of Martini, and Eleonora de Blaschis Russo. Together, they were the parents of:

- Agata Branciforte (b. c. 1632), who married Muzio Spadafora, 2nd Prince of Venetico, a son of Giuseppe Antonio Spadafora, 1st Marquess of San Martino and Guiomara Ruffo Santapau; Muzio was the brother, and heir, of Francesco Spadafora, 1st Prince of Venetico.
- Ercole Branciforte, 2nd Prince of Scordia (c. 1641–1688), (Note: Upon the death of his mother, he succeeded as Baron of Limbrici. Following his marriage, Ercole was invested as Lord of the fiefdom of Graniti (also called Mangiavacchi), on 20 May 1671.) who married Giovanna Morra, Marchioness of Motta Camastra, a daughter of Visconte Morra, 3rd Prince of Buccheri, and Lavinia Marziani; Giovanna's dowry was Motta Camastra Castle.
- Francesco Branciforte, 2nd Count of Sant'Antonio (d. 1663), who succeeded his father as the Count of Sant'Antonio. He died without issue; his heir was his brother Girolamo.
- Girolamo Branciforte, 3rd Count of Sant'Antonio; he married Eleonora Borgia, a daughter of a Castellan of Messina.

The Princess died on 13 June 1657. The Prince died in Messina on 9 April 1658.

=== Descendants ===
Through his daughter Agata, he was a grandfather of Giuseppe Domenico Spadafora, 3rd Prince of Venetico (d. 1670).

Through his son Ercole, he was a grandfather of Isabella Branciforte (wife of Giuseppe Valguarnera, 2nd Prince of Niscemi); Blasco Branciforte; Margherita Branciforte (wife of Luigi II Naselli, 3rd Prince of Aragona); and Giuseppe Branciforte, 3rd Prince of Scordia (c. 1670–1720) (who married his brother-in-law's sister, Anna Maria Naselli).

Through his youngest son Girolamo, he was a grandfather of Domenico Branciforte, 4th Count of Sant'Antonio (b. c. 1650), who married Maria Tommasa Guerrera; and Giuseppa Branciforte (b. 1655), who married Domenico Giuseppe Spadafora, 4th Prince of Venetico. (Note: Domenico Giuseppe Spadafora, 4th Prince of Venetico (1650–1703), was the son of Gutierre Spadafora, Baron of Sant'Pietro, the third son of Giuseppe Antonio Spadafora, 1st Marquess of San Martino.)
