= Cardinal Carafa =

Cardinal Carafa may refer to:

- Filippo Carafa della Serra (cardinal from 1378)
- Gianvincenzo Carafa (cardinal from 1527)
- Carlo Carafa (cardinal from 1555)
- Diomede Carafa (cardinal from 1555)
- Alfonso Carafa (cardinal from 1557)
- Antonio Carafa (cardinal from 1568)
- Decio Carafa (cardinal from 1611)
- Pier Luigi Carafa (cardinal from 1645)
- Carlo Carafa della Spina (cardinal from 1664)
- Fortunato Ilario Carafa della Spina (cardinal from 1686)
- Pier Luigi Carafa (cardinal from 1728)
- Francesco Carafa della Spina di Traetto (cardinal from 1773)
- Marino Carafa di Belvedere (cardinal from 1801)
- Domenico Carafa della Spina di Traetto (cardinal from 1844)
