= Pier Luigi Carafa (1581–1655) =

17th-century Catholic cardinal

His Eminence Pier Luigi Carafa
- Cardinal-Priest of Santi Silvestro e Martino ai Monti; Bishop of Tricarico
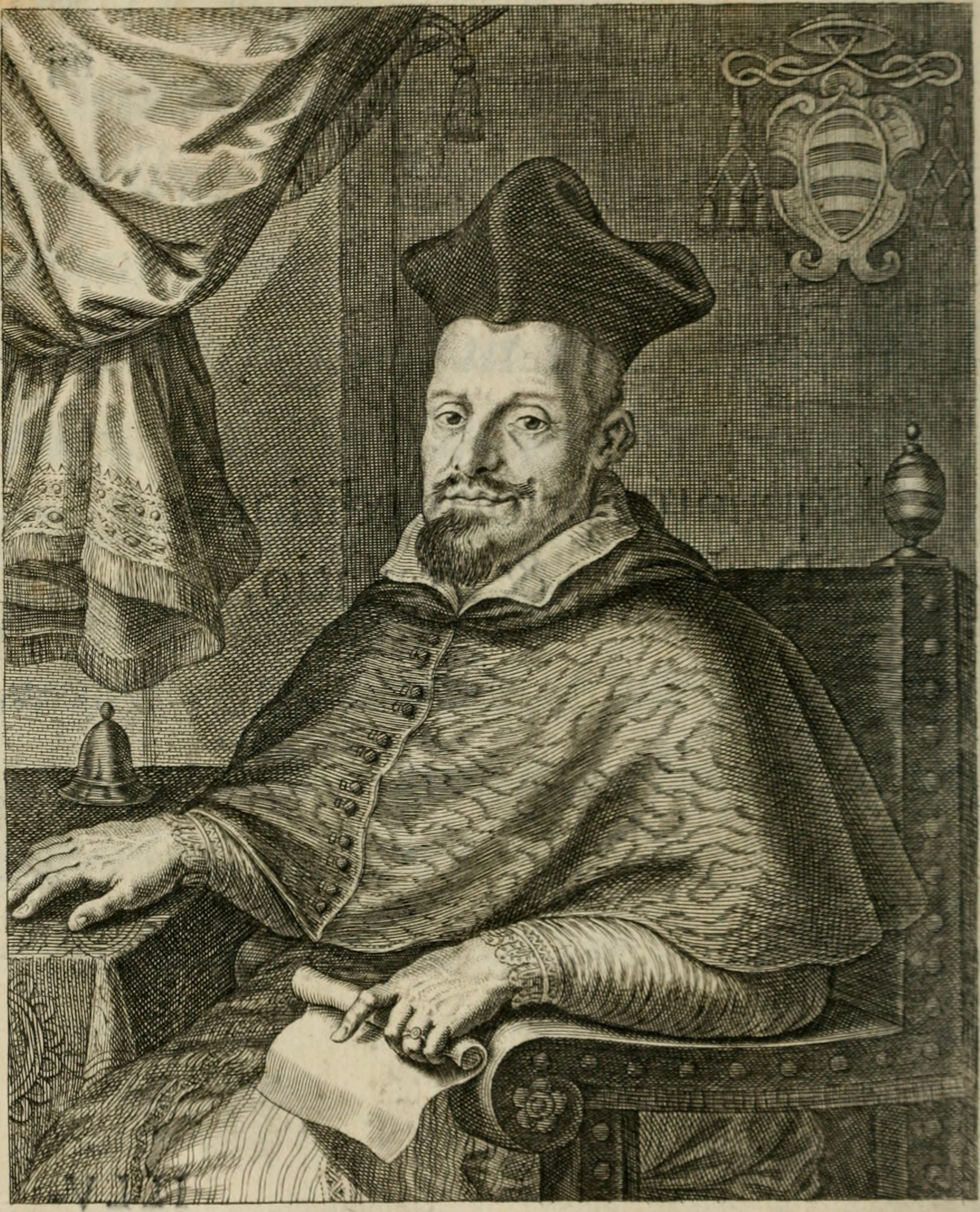
- Pier Luigi Carafa
- Church: Catholic Church

Orders
- Consecration: by Cosimo de Torres
- Rank: Cardinal-Priest

Pier Luigi Carafa (Senior) (18 July 1581, Naples, Italy – 15 February 1655, Rome, during the conclave) was a cardinal of the Catholic Church, and a member of the Roman Curia.

== Biography ==
He was bishop of Tricarico and Apostolic Nuncio to Cologne. On 2 June 1624, he was consecrated bishop by Cosimo de Torres, Cardinal-Priest of San Pancrazio, with Giovanni Antonio Angrisani, Archbishop of Sorrento, and Alessandro Suardi, Bishop of Lucera, serving as co-consecrators.

He was made cardinal in March 1645 by Pope Innocent X. He died during the 1655 papal conclave.

Other cardinals in the same family were Filippo Carafa della Serra (created 1378), Oliviero Carafa (created 1467), Carlo Carafa (1555), Diomede Carafa (1555), Alfonso Carafa (1557), Antonio Carafa (1568), Decio Carafa (1611), Carlo Carafa della Spina (1664), Fortunato Ilario Carafa della Spina (1686), Pierluigi Carafa (1728), Francesco Carafa della Spina di Traetto (1773), Marino Carafa di Belvedere (1801), and Domenico Carafa della Spina di Traetto (1844).

== Episcopal succession ==
While bishop, he was the principal consecrator of:

- Thomas de Grace, Auxiliary Bishop of Liège (1629);
- Andrés Aguado de Valdés, Bishop of Ariano (1642);
- Pomponio Spreti, Bishop of Cervia (1646);
- Pier Luigi Carafa (bishop), Bishop of Tricarico (1646);
- Donato Pascasio, Bishop of Trevico (1646);
- Louis de Fortia-Montréal, Bishop of Cavaillon (1646);
- Martino Megali, Bishop of Bova (1646);
- Giacomo Carafa, Archbishop of Rossano (1646);
- Francesco Antonio Depace, Bishop of Aquino (1646);
- Federico Sforza, Bishop of Rimini (1646);
- Raphael Levacovich, Archbishop of Achrida (1647);
- Simeone de Summis, Bishop of Sapë (1647);
- Tommaso Imperato, Bishop of Vico Equense (1647);
- Giovanni Ambrogio Bicuti, Bishop of Acqui (1647);
- Alessandro Masi, Bishop of Valva e Sulmona (1647);
- Gregorio Carafa (archbishop), Bishop of Cassano all'Jonio (1648);
- Tommaso d'Aquino, Bishop of Mottola (1648);
- Luigi Branciforte, Bishop of Melfi e Rapolla (1648);
- Paolo Teutonico, Archbishop of Manfredonia (1649);
- Gian Giacomo Cristoforo, Bishop of Lacedonia (1649);
- Giuseppe Sanfelice, Archbishop of Cosenza (1650);

and the principal co-consecrator of:

- Miguel Juan Balaguer Camarasa, Bishop of Malta (1635);
- Domenico Ravenna, Bishop of Nicastro (1635); and
- Luigi Pappacoda, Bishop of Capaccio (1635).

== External links and additional sources ==
- Cheney, David M. "Diocese of Tricarico". Catholic-Hierarchy.org. (for Chronology of Bishops) ^{[self-published]}
- Chow, Gabriel. "Diocese of Tricarico (Italy)". GCatholic.org. (for Chronology of Bishops) ^{[self-published]}
