= Spatafora =

Spatafora is a surname of Italian origin. Notable people with this surname include:

- Antonino Spatafora (died 1613), Italian painter and cartographer
- Marcello Spatafora (born 1941), Italian diplomat
- Matt Spatafora (born 1981), Canadian baseball coach

== See also ==
- Spadafora (surname)
