= Ercole Branciforte, 1st Duke of San Giovanni =

Ercole Branciforte, 1st Duke of San Giovanni (c. 1550 – 1616), also 7th Count of Cammarata, was an Italian aristocrat and diplomat who served as ambassador to Emperor Rudolf.

== Early life ==
Branciforte was born in c. 1550 in Palermo into the noble Branciforte family. He was eldest son of Girolamo Branciforte, 6th Count of Cammarata (c. 1527–1568) and Ippolita Settimo (b. c. 1528). After his father's death, his mother married Giuseppe Francesco Landriani and had Vittoria Landriani (wife of Tommaso di Carpegna, Count of Carpegna), Ercole's younger half-sister.

His paternal grandparents were Blasco Branciforte, Baron of Tavi, and Margherita Abbatellis, Countess of Cammarata. His maternal aunt, Belladama Branciforte, married Carlo Barrese, 1st Marquess of Militello. Through his half-sister Vittoria, he was uncle to Bishop Pietro Carpegna and Cardinal Ulderico Carpegna. His maternal grandparents were Michele Settimo, Marquess of Giarratana, and Belladama Barrese.

== Career ==
From his father, he inherited the fiefdoms of Vultano, Buonanotte Pietranigra, La Bruca, Giuffrè, lo Chiuppo, lo Gulfo, Chirubò and il Daini, formerly belonging to Motta S. Agata, and today aggregated to the County of Cammarata. In October 1572, he sold the fiefdom of Pasquale to Andrea Ortulano.

In 1587, the Duchy of San Giovanni was established by King Philip II of Spain and Branciforte was made the first Duke. In 1603, he was Governor of Bianchi di Palermo and was Deputy of the Kingdom in 1615.

Branciforte served as ambassador to Emperor Rudolf and was a Knight of the Order of Saint James of the Sword.

== Personal life ==
In 1580 Branciforte was married to Isabella Tagliavia d’Aragona (c. 1550–c. 1580), a daughter of Carlo d'Aragona Tagliavia, 1st Prince of Castelvetrano, 2nd Duke of Terranova, and Margherita Ventimiglia e Moncada (daughter of Simone Ventimiglia, 5th Marquess of Geraci). Together, they were the parents of:

- Girolamo Branciforte, 2nd Duke of San Giovanni (1582–1622), who married Caterina Gioeni, a daughter of Tomaso II Gioeni, 1st Prince of Castiglione. (Note: Caterina's niece, Isabella Gioeni Cardona, Princess of Castiglione (the daughter of Lorenzo III Gioeni, Prince of Castiglione), married Marcantonio Colonna, 7th Prince of Paliano).)

In c. 1597, Branciforte remarried to Agata (née Lanza) Branciforte (b. 1568). The widow of Giuseppe Branciforte Moncanda, 5th Count of Raccuja, (Note: From her marriage to Giuseppe Branciforte Moncanda, 5th Count of Raccuja (1560–1596), Agata Lanza was the mother of Giovanna Flavia Branciforte (b. c. 1592), who married Giovanni Branciforte, a son of Fabrizio Branciforte, 3rd Prince of Butera, and, after his death in 1622, Francesco Ventimiglia d'Aragona, 10th Marquess of Geraci (a son of Giuseppe Ventimiglia, 9th Marquess of Geraci); and Niccolò Branciforte, 1st Prince of Leonforte (1593–1661). His son was Pietro Branciforte, Marquess of Martini (1615–1661), who married Margherita Colonna Romano, daughter of Giuseppe Colonna Romano, 12th Baron of Fiumedinisi, 14th Baron of Cesarò, and Maria Antichi, Baroness of Giancascio and Realturco.) Agata was the daughter of Ottavio Lanza, 1st Prince of Trabia, 2nd Count of Mussomeli, and Giovanna Orteca Gioeni, Baroness of Valcorrente and Pietratagliata. Together, they were the parents of:

- Antonio Branciforte, 1st Prince of Scordia (c. 1596–1658), who married Giuseppina Campulo, a daughter of Francesco Campulo, Marquess of Martini, and Eleonora de Blaschis.
- Ottavio Branciforte (1599–1646), who became Bishop of Cefalù and Catania.
- Luigi Branciforte (c. 1600–1665), who became Bishop of Melfi e Rapolla; he was appointed by his brother to the dignity Doctor in utroque iure (Civil and Canon Law).

Branciforte died in 1616 and was buried at the Church of Saint Zita in Palermo.

=== Descendants ===
Through his son Girolamo, he was a grandfather of Francesco Branciforte, 3rd Duke of San Giovanni (c. 1600–1652), who married Antonia Gaetani and Antonia Notarbartolo, 2nd Princess of Villanova.
