= Goluboy Dunay =

River in Voronezh Oblast, Russia

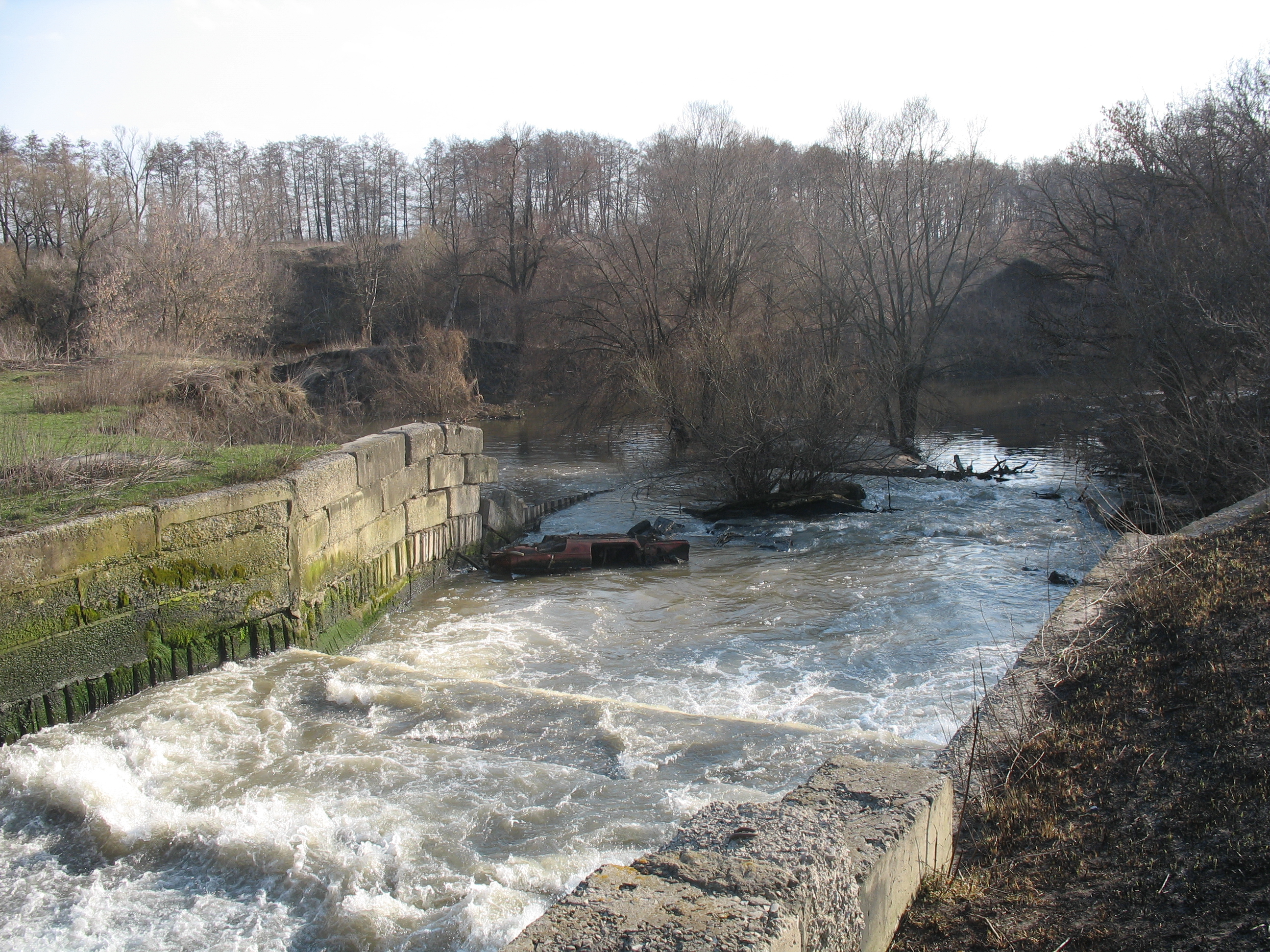

Goluboy Dunay River (Russian: Голубой Дунай - Sky blue Danube) is a river in Voronezh Oblast of Russia. It is a left tributary of the Don River. The Goluboy Dunay is 12 kilometres (7 mi) long. It flows over the north-western part of Voronezh. Most of the river's waters are from melting snow.
