= Gutierrez Michele Spadafora =

Italian Fascist politician (1903–1987)

Gutierrez Michele Spadafora 10th Prince of Spadafora

Member of the Chamber of Fasces and Corporations of the Kingdom of Italy
- In office 1941 – 5 August 1943

Undersecretary of Agriculture and Forests of the Italian Social Republic
- In office 13 February 1943 – 25 July 1943

Personal details
- Born: 7 September 1903 Palermo, Italy
- Died: 12 February 1987 (aged 83) Venetico, Italy
- Party: National Fascist Party
- Spouse: Giovanna D'Amelio (m. 1934; died 1979)

Gutierrez Michele Spadafora, 10th Prince of Spadafora (7 September 1903 – 12 February 1987), also 12th Duke of Spadafora, was an Italian aristocrat and politician.

== Early life ==
Spadafora was born in Palermo, Italy on 7 September 1903. He was the son of Michele Spadafora, 9th Prince of Spadafora (1874–1926) and Maria Ignazia Fatta (1879–1973).

His paternal grandparents were Gutierrez Michele Spadafora, 8th Prince of Spadafora, and Rosina Turrisi di Napoli (daughter of Giuseppe and Maria Felicia di Napoli, Duchess of Bissana). His maternal grandparents were Orazio Vincenzo Gandolfo Fatta, Baron of Fratta, and Sestina Sesta Pojero.

He graduated from university with a degree in Chemistry.

== Career ==
In 1937 Spadafora was appointed a member of the Board of Directors of the Bank of Sicily.

He served as a National Councillor of the Chamber of Fasces and Corporations (the lower house of the legislature of the Kingdom of Italy) from 1941 until 5 August 1943. He was Undersecretary to the Ministry of Agriculture and Forestry from 13 February to 25 July 1943.

Spadafora joined the Italian Social Republic. After the end of the War, he was arrested and detained in Regina Coeli he was released by intervention of King Umberto II on 5 June 1946.

He was on the board of directors of the World Trade Center, a company based in Rome which, today, is believed to have been a cover for the CIA which was, in turn, a subsidiary of Permindex.

== Personal life ==
In 1934 he married Giovanna D'Amelio (1911–1979), a daughter of Mariano D'Amelio, the President of the Court of Cassation. Together, they were the parents of:

- Donna Maria Grazia Micaela Stefania Rosalia Spadafora (1935–2020)
- Don Michele Maria Corrado Ruggero Stefano Spadafora, 11th Prince of Spadafora (1937–2015)

Spadafroa died in Venetico on 12 February 1987.
