= Carpegna (disambiguation) =

Carpegna may refer to:

- Carpegna, an Italian noble family started by Guido I Carpegna in the XIII century
- Carpegna (surname), an Italian surname

== Places ==
- Carpegna, a comune (municipality) in the Province of Pesaro e Urbino, Italy
- Monte Carpegna, a mountain at the border of the Province of Rimini with the Province of Pesaro and Urbino, region of Marche, Italy

== Buildings ==
- Palazzo Carpegna, former seat of the Academy of St Luke, located in Rome, Italy
- San Pio V a Villa Carpegna, a Titular Church in the Roman Catholic Church, located in Rome, Italy
