= Saint Gerontius =

Saint Gerontius may refer to:

- Gerontius of Cervia (died 501), Italian bishop who is venerated as a saint
- Geraint, character from Welsh folklore and Arthurian legend, a king of Dumnonia and a valiant warrior
