= Paolo Teutonico =

17th-century Roman Catholic bishop

Most Reverend Paolo Teutonico
- Archbishop of Manfredonia
- Church: Catholic Church
- Archdiocese: Archdiocese of Manfredonia
- In office: 1649–1651
- Predecessor: Antonio Marullo
- Successor: Giovanni Alfonso Puccinelli

Orders
- Consecration: 18 Apr 1649 by Pier Luigi Carafa (seniore)

Personal details
- Born: 1587 Nola, Italy
- Died: Nov 1651 (age 64)

Paolo Teutonico (1587–1651) was a Roman Catholic prelate who served as Archbishop of Manfredonia (1649–1651).

== Biography ==
Paolo Teutonico was born in 1587 in Nola, Italy. On 12 Apr 1649, he was appointed during the papacy of Pope Urban VIII as Archbishop of Manfredonia. On 18 Apr 1649, he was consecrated bishop by Pier Luigi Carafa (seniore), Cardinal-Priest of Santi Silvestro e Martino ai Monti, with Ranuccio Scotti Douglas, Bishop of Borgo San Donnino, and Enea di Cesare Spennazzi, Bishop of Ferentino, serving as co-consecrators. He served as Archbishop of Manfredonia until his death in Nov 1651.

== External links and additional sources ==
- Cheney, David M. "Archdiocese of Manfredonia-Vieste-San Giovanni Rotondo". Catholic-Hierarchy.org. (for Chronology of Bishops) ^{[self-published]}
- Chow, Gabriel. "Archdiocese of Manfredonia-Vieste-San Giovanni Rotondo (Italy)". GCatholic.org. (for Chronology of Bishops) ^{[self-published]}

Catholic Church titles
Preceded by Antonio Marullo	Archbishop of Manfredonia; 1649–1651	Succeeded by Giovanni Alfonso Puccinelli
