= Carpegna (surname) =

Carpegna is an Italian surname. Notable people with this name include the following:

- Daniel Varela Suanzes-Carpegna (born 1951), Spanish politician and former Member of the EU Parliament
- Gasparo di Carpegna (1661–1733), great-grandnephew of Michelangelo Buonarroti, Florentine official at the court of Cosimo III
- Gaspare Carpegna (1625–1714), Italian Roman Catholic Cardinal
- Mario Gabrielli di Carpegna (1856–1924), Italian nobleman, politician and soldier
- Massimo Carpegna (born 1955), Italian conductor
- Pietro Carpegna, or Petrus de Carpinea (1592–1630), Italian Roman Catholic Bishop of Gubbio
- Ulderico Carpegna (1595–1679), Italian jurist and Cardinal of the Roman Catholic Church

== See also ==
- Carpegna (disambiguation)
