= Luigi Branciforte =

1xth-century Roman Catholic bishop

Most Reverend Luigi Branciforte
- Bishop of Melfi e Rapolla
- Church: Catholic Church
- Diocese: Diocese of Melfi e Rapolla
- In office: 1648–1665
- Predecessor: Gerolamo Pellegrini
- Successor: Giulio Caracciolo

Personal details
- Born: Palermo, Italy
- Died: 1665
- Parents: Ercole Branciforte, 1st Duke of San Giovanni

Luigi Branciforte (died 1665) was a Roman Catholic prelate who served as Bishop of Melfi e Rapolla (1648–1665).

== Early life ==
Luigi Branciforte was born in Palermo, Italy. He was the son of Ercole Branciforte, 1st Duke of San Giovanni and, his second wife, Agata Lanza. Among his siblings were brothers Antonio Branciforte, 1st Prince of Scordia, and Ottavio Branciforte, who was Bishop of Cefalù and Catania. From his mother's previous marriage, his elder half-brother was Niccolò Branciforte, 1st Prince of Leonforte.

== Career ==
On 28 Sep 1648, he was appointed during the papacy of Pope Innocent X as Bishop of Melfi e Rapolla. On 18 Oct 1648, he was consecrated bishop by Pier Luigi Carafa (seniore), Cardinal-Priest of Santi Silvestro e Martino ai Monti. He served as Bishop of Melfi e Rapolla until his death in 1665.

== External links and additional sources ==
- Cheney, David M. "Diocese of Melfi-Rapolla-Venosa". Catholic-Hierarchy.org. (for Chronology of Bishops) ^{[self-published]}
- Chow, Gabriel. "Diocese of Melfi-Rapolla-Venosa (Italy)". GCatholic.org. (for Chronology of Bishops) ^{[self-published]}

Catholic Church titles
Preceded by Gerolamo Pellegrini	Bishop of Melfi e Rapolla; 1648–1665	Succeeded by Giulio Caracciolo
