= Vincenzo La Barbera =

Italian painter and architect (1577–1642)

Vincenzo La Barbera (c. 1577 – 1642) was an Italian Mannerist architect and painter.

== Biography ==
The son of Pietro and Domenica de Michele, his family were of Ligurian descent. The artist was born in Termini Imerese, to which his grandfather Bartolomeo Barbieri had moved in the first half of the 16th century before marrying a woman from that city named Lucrezia. That city was then Sicily's richest 'Caricatore' (grain-storing city).

La Barbera studied under Antonino Spatafora, a painter and architect from Palermo who had a studio in Termini Imerese between the end of the 16th century and the first decade of the 17th century. There he produced important architectural designs such as the expansion of the Maggior Chiesa and the Palazzo Civico. In 1597 La Barbera married Spatafora's daughter Elisabetta. In 1609 La Barbera designed the Sala del Magistrato in the modernised Palazzo Civico, painting that room's wall frescoes of episodes from the history of Termini Imerese and the nearby ancient Greek colony of Himera (648 BC – 409 BC). This fresco cycle is perhaps Sicily's only such example of celebrating events from a city's history. That same year La Barbera designed the expansion of the Maggior Chiesa in neighbouring Caccamo.

His earliest surviving paintings date to 1600. He stayed in the Albergheria district of Palermo from 1607 to 1608, then the city's main artistic district. His second period in Termini Imerese from 1609 to 1621 included his appointment as city architect on Spatafora's death in 1613. It also saw La Barbera design several buildings in the city, such as the church in S. Croce al Monte della Compagnia dei Bianchi and the church and monastery of S. Marco Evangelista delle Clarisse. At the same time his flourishing studio produced large numbers of paintings and pupils, with commissions coming in from Madonie to monti Sicani.

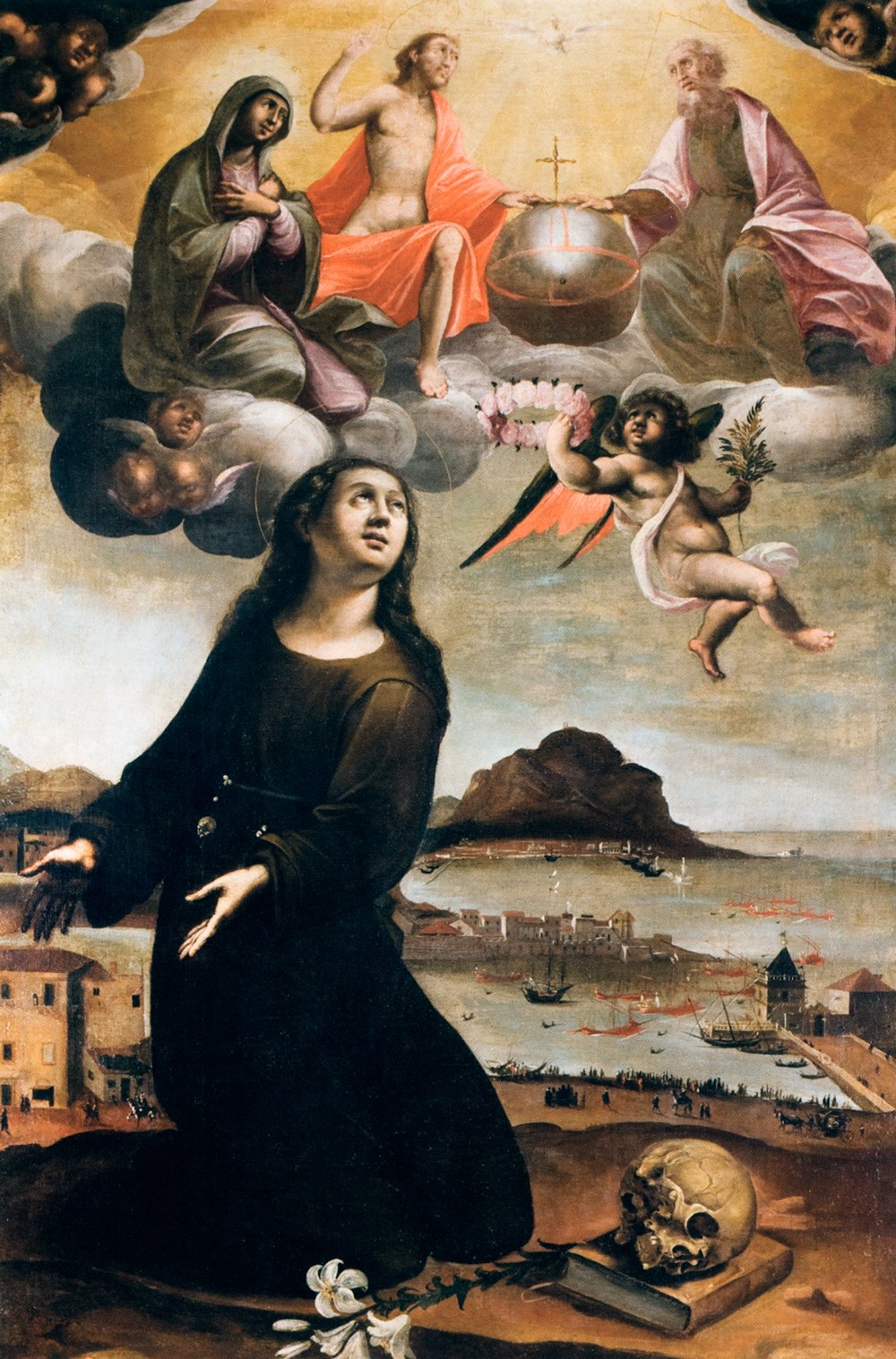
Vincenzo La Barbera, Saint Rosalia Interceding for Palermo, 1624–1625, Palermo, Museo diocesano

In 1622 he moved back to Palermo for the ceremonies surrounding the canonisation of the Jesuit saints Francis Xavier and Ignatius of Loyola. Varied Jesuit commissions and moving among the Genoese community thanks to his Ligurian ancestry both opened up several further religious and noble commissions to La Barbera. From the outset he was aided by the city architect Mariano Smiriglio and in 1626 he designed Palermo's Carmelo church. He became strongly devoted to Saint Rosalia upon the rediscovery of her relics and was the first artist to codify her iconography.

One pupil of La Barbera in Palermo was the painter and architect Mariano Quaranta who became architect to the Palermo Senate in 1647 on Pietro Novelli's death. From Termini Imerese like his master, Quaranta also married La Barbera's daughter Agata. Another of La Barbera's pupils was his son Francesco Maria, who produced several works for Palermo's Jesuit church and became a priest.

In 1637–1638 La Barbera became one of the artists commissioned to paint the frescoes in the 'Sala Montalto' in Palermo's Palazzo Reale. His death certificate has been traced, dating his death to March 1642.

== Selected paintings ==
- 1600, Martyrdom of Saint Apollonia, San Francesco d'Assisi church, Ciminna
- 1616, Holy Family with Saint Jerome, Saint Laurence and Saint Rosalia, San Girolamo church in the Capuchin monastery, Termini Imerese.
- 1628, Crucifixion with the Holy Souls in Purgatory, San'Agata Vergine e Martire Basilica, Montemaggiore Belsito.
- 1629, Christ Gives the Keys to Saint Peter, duomo di Santa Maria Maddalena, Ciminna
- Undated (17th century), Dormition of the Virgin, duomo di Santa Maria Maddalena, Cimmina

== Bibliography (in Italian) ==
- A. CONTINO & S. MANTIA, Un felice connubio artistico: La Barbera- Spatafora, in “Le Madonie” LXXVII, 3, 1º marzo 1997, p. 3.
- A. CONTINO & S. MANTIA, Vincenzo La Barbera architetto e pittore termitano. Presentazione di Maria Concetta Di Natale, Termini Imerese, ed. GASM, 150 p., 14 figg., appendice documentaria, albero genealogico.
- A. CONTINO & S. MANTIA, Architetti e pittori a Termini imerese tra il XVI ed il XVII secolo, Termini Imerese, ed. GASM, 190 p., 9 figg., Appendice I (regest of the documents relating to Vincenzo La Barbera), appendice II (regest of the documents relating to Silvestre Di Blasi), appendice III (genealogical tables) appendice IV ('un anno di ricerche, marzo 1999– marzo 2000').
