= Spadafora family =

Sicilian aristocratic family

Spadafora Italian: Casa di Spadafora
- Italian noble family
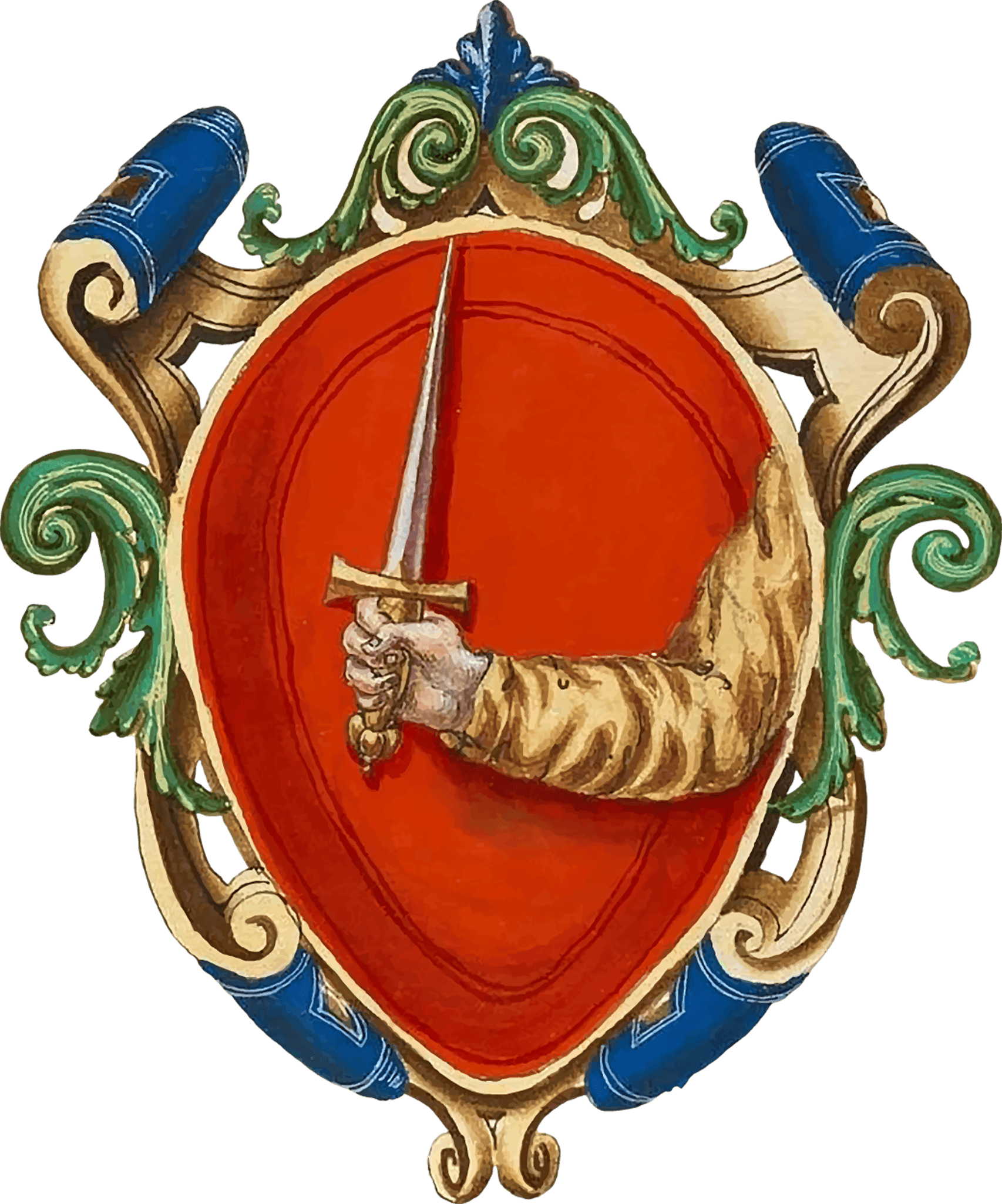
- Coat of arms of the Spadafora family
- Country: Italy Former countries: Kingdom of Sicily; Two Sicilies; Kingdom of Italy
- Founded: 13th century
- Titles: Prince of Maletto; Prince of Venetico; Prince of San Pietro; Prince of Mazzarà; Prince of Policastrello; Duke of San Pietro; Marquess of Policastrello; Marquess of Carletto; Marquess of San Martino; Count of Andria

Spadafora is the name of an influential Sicilian aristocratic family of Italian nobles, clergy. Over the centuries it has accumulated five Principalities, a Duchy, two Marquisates, a County and twenty-five Baronies. Some of the members of the family have held leading positions in the Kingdom of Sicily and in some European states.

== History ==
In 1230, Giovanni Spatafora was secretary to Frederick II, Emperor and King of Sicily. By the 13th century, members of the family began to spread along the Tyrrhenian coast of Sicily, between Palermo and Messina and in part of the Ionian coast. Pietro Damiano, Senator of Randazzo, Baron of Jaci from 1282 and of Troina in 1304 (a fiefdom that in 1306 would change with that of Roccella), in June 1291, leader of the King of Aragon, was taken prisoner during the Siege of Agosta. In Messina we find traces of Matteo, Senator of the city in 1358. Then Corrado who fell in battle at Jaci in 1357. And again, another Corrado, Strategote of Messina in 1395.

From Corrado Spatafora or Spadafora Castellano of Messina, who marries Marianna Maniaci, descendant of Prince Giorgio Maniace, Prince and Catepan of the Emperor of Byzantium, the two main branches branch off: that of the Princes of Maletto and Venetico, Marquesses of San Martino, Barons of Mazzarrà, della Cavalleria, Pirago, Persinaci. The other branch were the Princes of San Pietro, Dukes of San Pietro, Marquesses of Policastrello and Carletto, Counts of Andria, Barons of the Carriaggi of San Pietro, Lords of Mortellito, Treponti, Pedalacia, Terra del Bordonaro, Fiume Cerramo, Magnavacca, Torre Spagnola.

Another branch is the Barons, then Princes of Mazzarà, created in 1673 for Don Pietro Spadafora.

== Notable members ==
- Domenico Spadafora (1450–1521), Italian Roman Catholic priest. (Note: Domenico Spadafora was born in Randazzo in 1450 to Michele Spadafora and Marianna Maniace Ventimiglia, he soon gave up the comforts that came from his family. He wanted to serve the Lord so he entered the Dominican Order and began at the Convent of Santa Zita in Palermo, founded by Pietro Geremia. Spadaforo received beatification from Pope Benedict XV in 1921 after the pontiff confirmed the late priest's 'cultus' (or popular and widespread devotion) as being enduring.)
- Gutierrez Michele Spadafora (1903–1987), 12th Duke of Spadafora, was an Italian politician.

=== Princes of Maletto (1619) ===
- Michele Spadafora, 1st Prince of Maletto (1570–1619)
- Francesco Spadafora, 2nd Prince of Maletto
- Michele Spadafora, 3rd Prince of Maletto (1622–1677)

=== Princes of Venetico (1629) ===
- 1629–1654: Francesco Spadafora, 1st Prince of Venetico (c. 1620–1654), a son of Giuseppe Antonio Spadafora, 1st Marquess of San Martino.
- 1654–1661: Muzio Spadafora, 2nd Prince of Venetico (d. 1661), brother of the preceding. (Note: Muzio Spadafora, 2nd Prince of Venetico, married Agata Branciforte, a daughter of Antonio Branciforte, 1st Prince of Scordia and Giuseppa Campulo Blaschis.)
- 1661–1670: Giuseppe Domenico Spadafora, 3rd Prince of Venetico (d. 1670), son of the preceding.
- 1670–1703: Domenico Giuseppe Spadafora, 4th Prince of Venetico (1650–1703); cousin of the preceding. (Note: Domenico Giuseppe Spadafora, 4th Prince of Venetico (1650–1703), was the son of Gutierre Spadafora, Baron of Sant'Pietro (the third son of Giuseppe Antonio Spadafora, 1st Marquess of San Martino); he married Giuseppa Branciforte (b. 1655), a granddaughter of Antonio Branciforte, 1st Prince of Scordia through his youngest son, Girolamo Branciforte, 3rd Count of Sant'Antonio.)
- 1703–1723: Muzio Spadafora, 5th Prince of Venetico (1676–1723)
- 1723–1754: Domenico Spadafora, 6th Prince of Venetico (1702–1754)
- 1754–1804: Federico Spadafora, 7th Prince of Venetico (1734–1804), also Prince of Maletto
- 1754–1851: Domenico Spadafora, 8th Prince of Venetico (1779–1851), also Prince of Maletto
- Salvatore Federico Monroy, 10th Prince of Venetico (b. 1873) (Note: Salvatore Federico Monroy, 10th Prince of Venetico was the son of Alonso Alberto Monroy, 14th Prince of Maletto (1845–1923) and grandson of Francesca Ascencio Lucchese-Palli, 13th Princess of Maletto.)

=== Princes of Mazzarà (1673) ===
- Pietro Spadafora, 1st Prince of Mazzarà

=== Princes of Policastrello (1710) ===
- 1710–1703: Muzio Spadafora, 1st Prince of Policastrello (b. 1660)
- 1710–1748: Gutierre Spadafora, 2nd Prince of Policastrello (1690–1748)
- 1748–1779: Muzio Corrado Onofrio Spadafora, 3rd Prince of Policastrello (1732–1779)
- 1779–: Gaetano Spadafora, 4th Prince of Policastrello
