= Sky blue =

Color

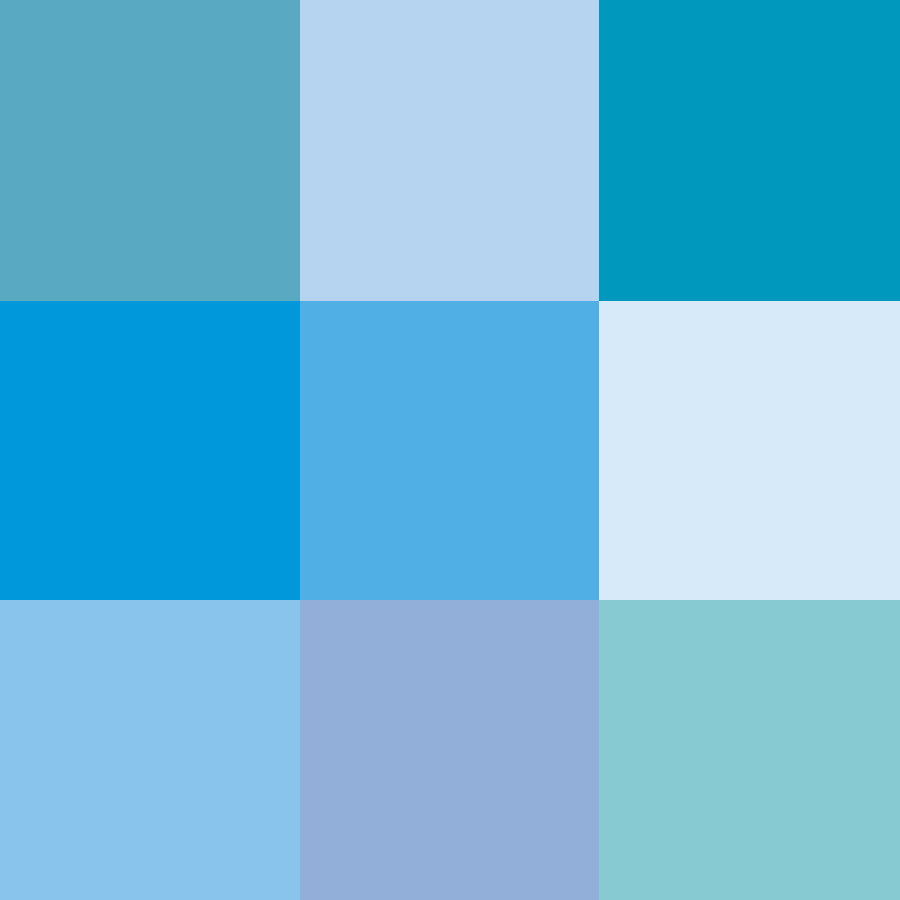

Common connotations
- boys, daylight, water, air, paleness

Colour coordinates
- Hex triplet: #87CEEB
- sRGB^{B} (r, g, b): (135, 206, 235)
- HSV (h, s, v): (197°, 43%, 92%)
- CIELCh_{uv} (L, C, h): (79, 46, 223°)
- Source: X11 colour names
- ISCC–NBS descriptor: Very light greenish blue
- B: Normalized to [0–255] (byte)

Sky blue refers to a collection of shades comparable to that of a clear daytime sky. Typically it is a shade of cyan or light teal, though some iterations are closer to light azure or light blue. The term (as "sky blew") is attested from 1681. A 1585 translation of Nicolas de Nicolay's 1576 Les navigations, peregrinations et voyages faicts en la Turquie includes "the tulbant [turban] of the merchant must be skie coloured".

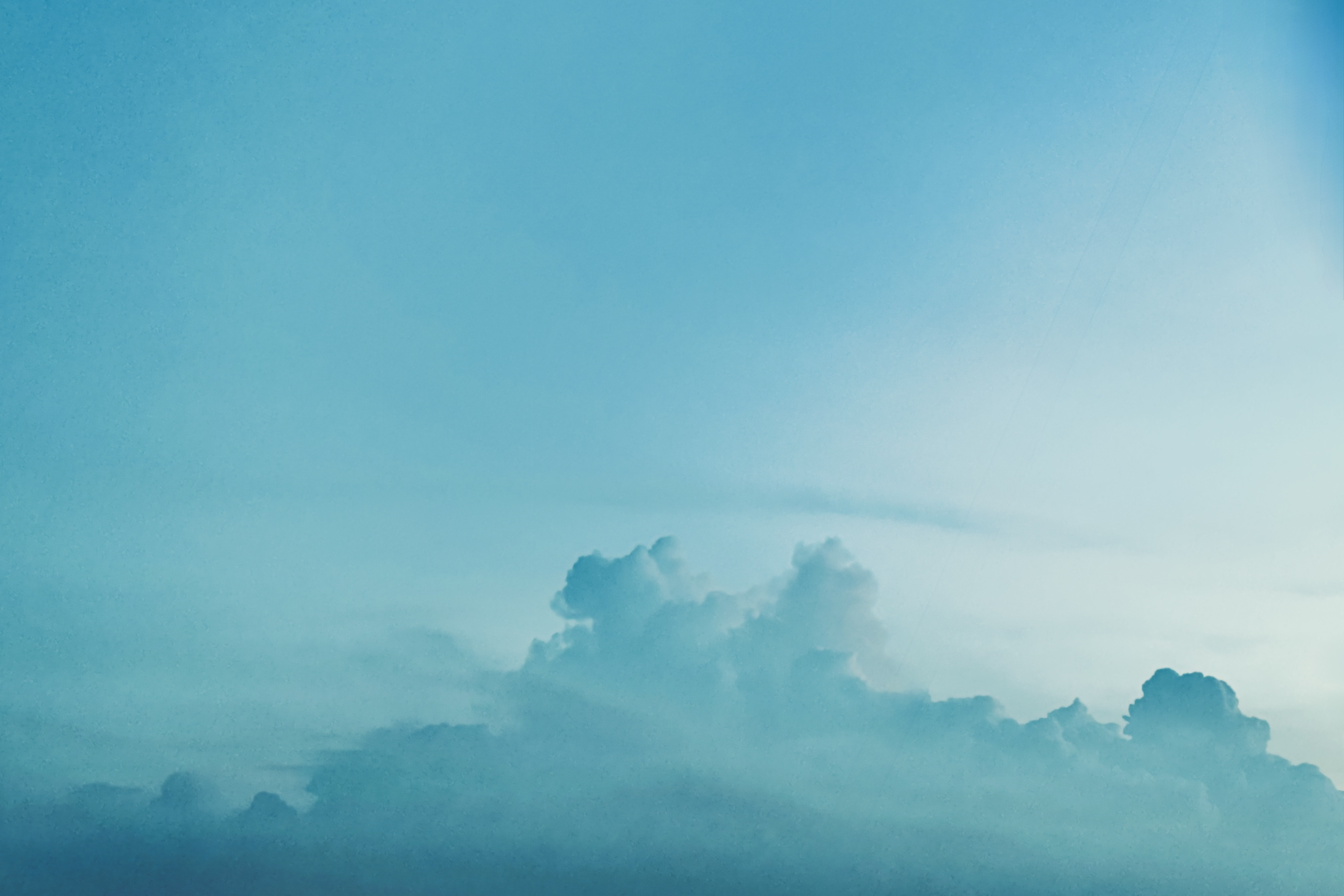
Cumulus clouds showing vertical development against a clear sky.

Displayed at right is the web colour sky blue.

== Variations ==
=== Celeste ===
Celeste

Colour coordinates
- Hex triplet: #B2FFFF
- sRGB^{B} (r, g, b): (178, 255, 255)
- HSV (h, s, v): (180°, 30%, 100%)
- CIELCh_{uv} (L, C, h): (95, 38, 192°)
- Source: S.Fantetti e C.Petracchi (2001). Il dizionario dei colori: nomi e valori in quadricromia. Zanichelli. ISBN 8808079953.
- ISCC–NBS descriptor: Very light bluish green
- B: Normalized to [0–255] (byte)

Celeste (Spanish: [θeˈleste, se-], Italian: [tʃeˈlɛste], English: /sɪˈlɛst/) is the colloquial name for the pale turquoise blue colour. The same word, meaning "of the sky", is used in Spanish, Portuguese and Italian for the colour. Etymologically, it is derived by Latin term caelestis, that means del cielo in Italian. There are two "conventional" colours denominated celeste, according to the colour models. One is the pure Celeste, (HEX#B2FFFF; RGB 178,255,255) which may be referred as the "true" celeste as it is traditionally or officially understood; in English, it may also be referred to as Italian sky blue (blu cielo italiano) and Bianchi Green, referring to Bianchi, the famous Italian company for bikes, the first in the history of vehicles, whose colour is characteristic. The Japanese equivalent is known as sora iro or mizuiro, referring to the colour of the sky or its reflection on the sea. The other one is also another conventional celeste (HEX #99cbff and RGB 153,203,255) containing 100% of blue, associated to a more generic colour of the sky and remembering a type of light zenithal blue and the next sky blue gradations.

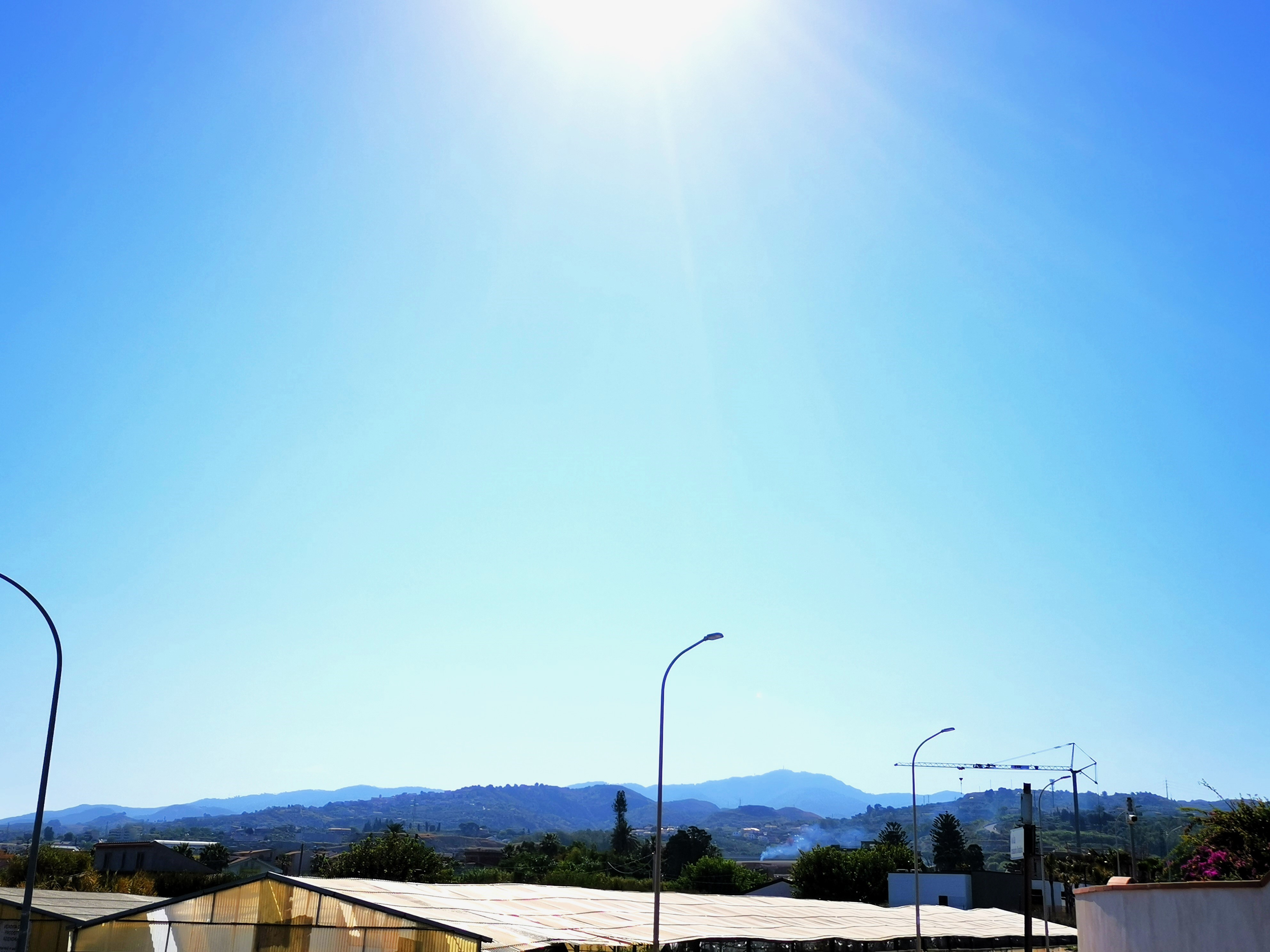
Pure Celeste between Spadafora and Torregrotta, Sicily in September; the colour of the ideal sky is shown with a perfect or near-perfect weather, especially close to the horizon, where the cyan is more evident.

Celeste, that is, the pure Celeste strictly speaking (HEX #B2FFFF; RGB 178,255,255) from here on (and which can be thought as the "true" or "conventional" celeste), is a gradation of the cyan and a cold colour. It is the colour of the sky with optimal visibility, when it is clear, perfectly or near-perfectly cloudless and sunny with an optimal quantity of humidity, absence or optimal quantity of atmospheric dust, aerosol/particulates with a good or at least moderate AIQ (Air Quality Index), absence of mist, haze, resulting in a good diffusion of light blue without saturation, which causes the prevalence of the white or of the warm colours of sunrise and sunset; in these excellent conditions, it is possible to see Celeste and its variations perpendicularly to the Sun, toward the horizon, where the sunlight is maximum as the sky is directly illuminated, and these shades merge with the golden light of solar rays and the white of the horizon, both in the morning and afternoon, or even across the entire region between the star and the horizon, when the star is high, relatively next to solar or true noon. In particular, in the warm seasons, with the inclination of a hemisphere with respect to the Sun, there are simultaneously the optimisation of sunlight, daylight hours, and so the pure celeste might be visible in the entire region between the horizon and Sun both in the morning and afternoon; generally, the higher the Sun is during the day and the year, the less visible celeste and variations will be. In particular, they are most visible in the morning across the Sun and the horizon in the early hours with the rising of the star, sometimes even until noon, until they are reduced to a few stripes on the horizon, where the cyan is more intense. In the afternoon, it is the opposite and the pure celeste and similar gradations could be widely visible between the Sun and horizon when the star is high, but starting to go down, that is especially in the early afternoon hours. Instead, in the cold season, with a low Sun and sunlight, the pure celeste may be visible only at the horizon, where the cyan is more intense for the maximum light, but is more difficult to see because of the major weather instability. Since sunlight is strongest at the horizon, that is where the pure celeste is more evident, producing the tonalities of the cyan, very close to the white.

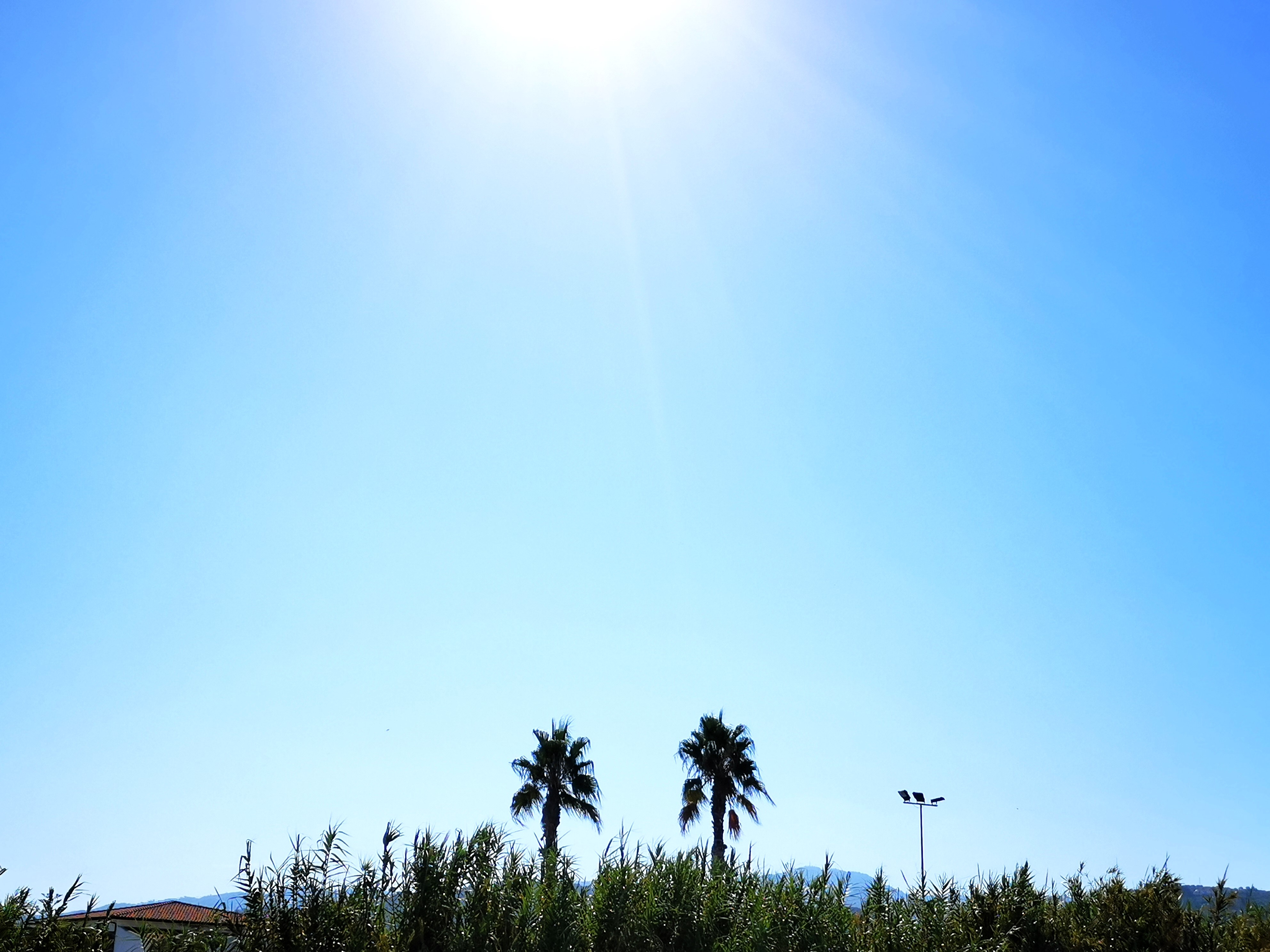
Pure Celeste between Spadafora and Torregrotta, Sicily, with perfectly clear, serene and sunny weather in September. The pure celeste is more evident close to the horizon, where the cyan is more intense.

Alternatively, other variants, like Celeste polvere, Pallido and Velato, are visible towards the horizon when the Sun is near to the zenith, always with conditions for good visibility. In the afternoon, always with good conditions, these three types of celeste, together with softer and less bright shades of celeste, are visible at a straight angle from north to south, until around sunset.

In reality, it can be difficult to observe the pure celeste, being the colour of a clear day with optimal meteorological conditions; other shades of blue are often visible in the sky, as Light Sky Blue and similar gradations, among which is the other conventional celeste, similar to the light blue sky colours rather than the pure celeste. One scientific explanation needs to be made: the Sun emits light across the entire electromagnetic spectrum and so celeste, which is very close to the white with a RGB of 178,255,255, is very luminous, and so visible in the direction of the Sun because it is there the maximum quantity of solar light is present, especially towards the horizon, even if human eyes can only perceive the visible light. Here celeste and variations are more visible in the warm seasons because of the inclination of a hemisphere with respect to the Sun, in spring and especially summer, with the optimisation of solar light, hours of daylight and meteorological factors.

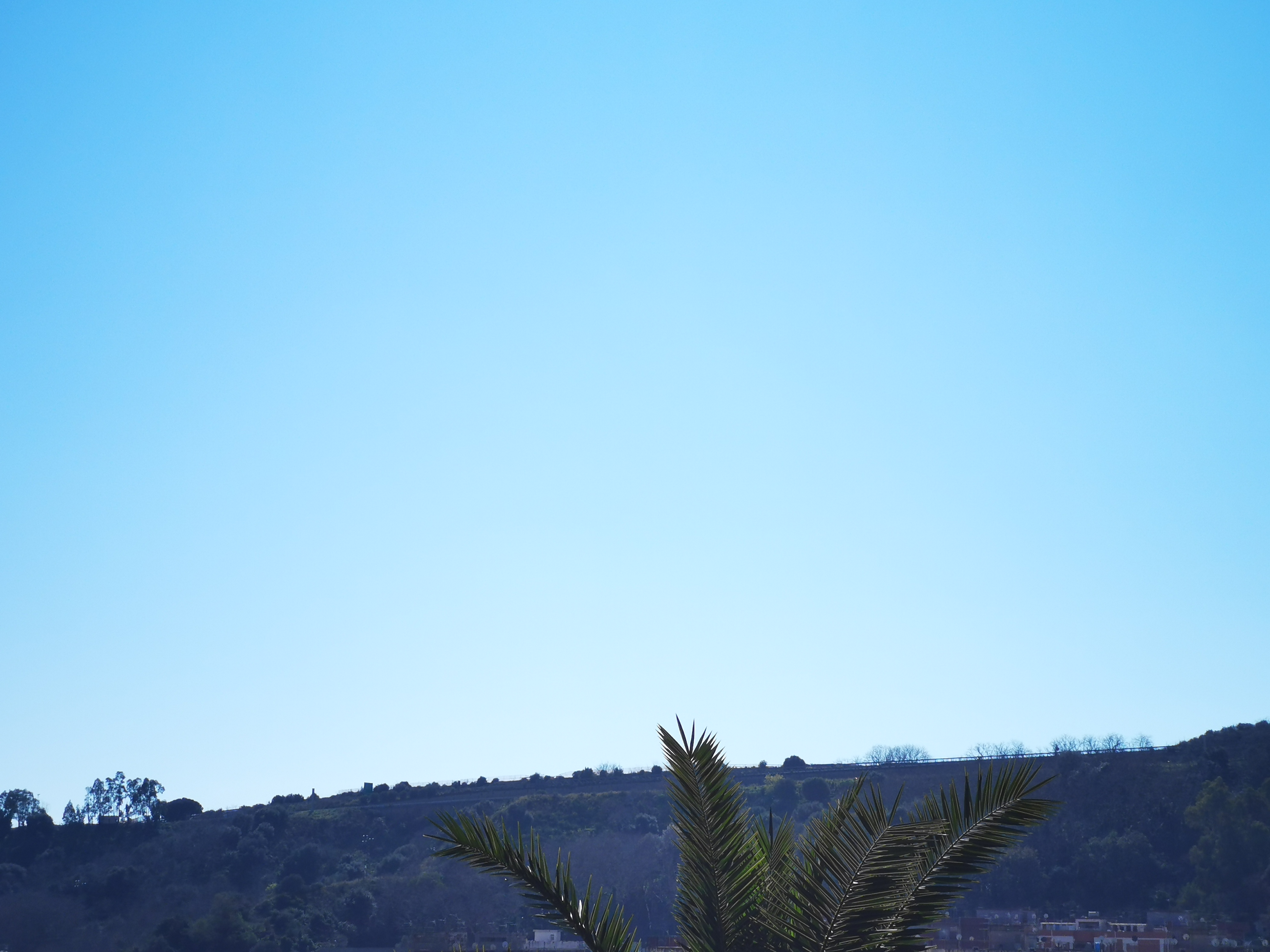
Pure celeste at the horizon of Messina, Sicily, in February; in this part of the year, with a relatively low Sun, the pure celeste is shown only at the horizon and around noon.

Being the gradation of near-perfectly sunny and clear sky, the colour of an ideal sky, it is difficult to see pure celeste, especially during the coldest or most unstable seasons; instead, generically the sky shows the colour of the other conventional celeste with 100% of blue, recalling a light zenithal blue and the next other types of sky blue; this is not surprising due to the best diffusion of the blue because of the Raylegh scattering.

Bleu celeste ("sky blue") is a rarely occurring tincture in heraldry (not being one of the seven main colours or metals or the three "staynard colours"). This tincture is sometimes also called ciel or simply celeste. It is depicted in a lighter shade than the range of shades of the more traditional tincture azure, which is the standard blue used in heraldry.

==== Gradations ====
The Italian Wikipedia cites Il dizionario dei colori: nomi e valori in quadricromia by S.Fantetti and C.Petracchi and describes multiple variants of celeste as shown below, plus details as defined in the infobox above.

| colour | name | C | M | Y | K | R | G | B | HEX |
|---|---|---|---|---|---|---|---|---|---|
| | celeste (sky blue, heavenly blue, Italian sky blue, bianchi green) | 030 | 000 | 000 | 000 | 178 | 255 | 255 | B2FFFF |
| | celeste polvere powdery | 010 | 000 | 000 | 000 | 230 | 255 | 255 | E6FFFF |
| | celeste pallido (pale) | 016 | 000 | 003 | 000 | 204 | 255 | 255 | CCFFFF |
| | celeste velato Veiler overcast | 020 | 010 | 010 | 000 | 204 | 230 | 230 | CCE6E6 |
| | celeste opaco opaque | 050 | 020 | 020 | 000 | 128 | 204 | 204 | 80CCCC |

=== Light sky blue ===
Light sky blue

Colour coordinates
- Hex triplet: #87CEFA
- sRGB^{B} (r, g, b): (135, 206, 250)
- HSV (h, s, v): (203°, 46%, 98%)
- CIELCh_{uv} (L, C, h): (80, 55, 233°)
- Source: X11 color names
- ISCC–NBS descriptor: Brilliant greenish blue
- B: Normalized to [0–255] (byte)

Displayed at right is the web colour light sky blue. It is close in shade to baby blue.

=== Medium sky blue ===
Medium sky blue

Colour coordinates
- Hex triplet: #80DAEB
- sRGB^{B} (r, g, b): (128, 218, 235)
- HSV (h, s, v): (190°, 46%, 92%)
- CIELCh_{uv} (L, C, h): (82, 46, 210°)
- Source: Crayola
- ISCC–NBS descriptor: Very light greenish blue
- B: Normalized to [0–255] (byte)

Displayed at right is the colour medium sky blue. This is the colour that is called sky blue in Crayola crayons. This colour was formulated by Crayola in 1958.

"Sky blue" appears in the 32, 48, 64, 96 and 120 packs of crayons.

=== Vivid sky blue ===
Vivid sky blue

Colour coordinates
- Hex triplet: #00CCFF
- sRGB^{B} (r, g, b): (0, 204, 255)
- HSV (h, s, v): (192°, 100%, 100%)
- CIELCh_{uv} (L, C, h): (76, 78, 226°)
- Source: Crayola C.P.
- ISCC–NBS descriptor: Brilliant greenish blue
- B: Normalized to [0–255] (byte)

Displayed at right is the colour vivid sky blue.

=== Deep sky blue ===
Deep sky blue

Colour coordinates
- Hex triplet: #00BFFF
- sRGB^{B} (r, g, b): (0, 191, 255)
- HSV (h, s, v): (195°, 100%, 100%)
- CIELCh_{uv} (L, C, h): (73, 83, 234°)
- Source: X11
- ISCC–NBS descriptor: Brilliant greenish blue
- B: Normalized to [0–255] (byte)

Deep sky blue is an azure-cyan colour associated with deep shade of sky blue.

Deep sky blue is a web colour.

This is the colour on the colour wheel (RGB/HSV colour wheel) halfway between azure and cyan.

The colour name deep sky blue came into use with the formulisation of the X11 colour names over 1985–1989.

The normalised colour coordinates for deep sky blue are identical to Capri, which first came into use as a colour name in English in 1920.

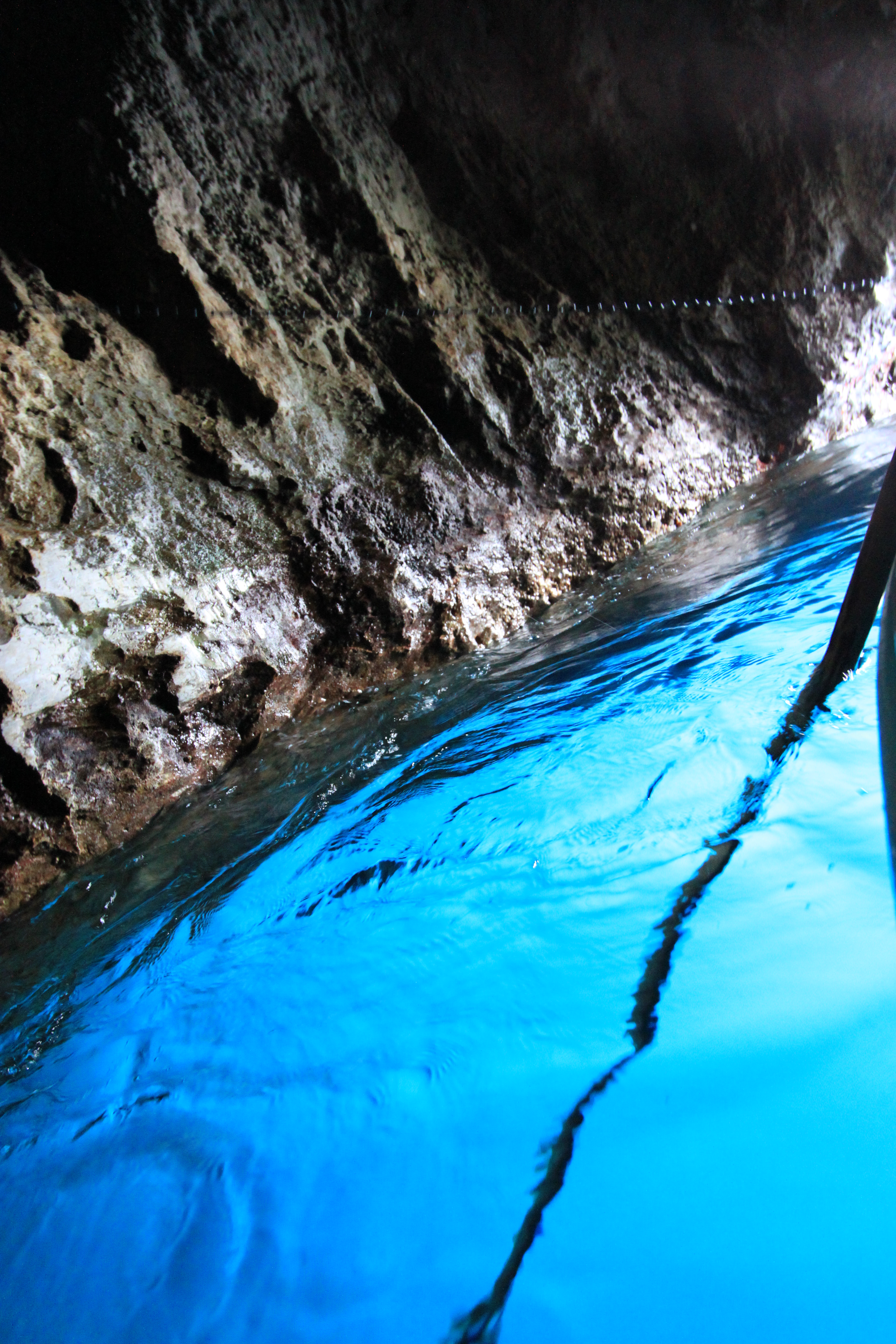
Deep sky blue waters of the Blue Grotto in Capri, namesake of the original (and ongoing) name for this colour

=== French sky blue ===
French sky blue

Colour coordinates
- Hex triplet: #77B5FE
- sRGB^{B} (r, g, b): (119, 181, 254)
- HSV (h, s, v): (212°, 53%, 100%)
- CIELCh_{uv} (L, C, h): (72, 74, 247°)
- Source: Pourpre.com
- ISCC–NBS descriptor: Brilliant blue
- B: Normalized to [0–255] (byte)

At right is displayed the colour French sky blue, which is the tone of sky blue that is called sky blue (bleu ciel) in the Pourpre.com colour list, a colour list widely popular in France.

=== Spanish sky blue ===
Spanish sky blue

Colour coordinates
- Hex triplet: #00AAE4
- sRGB^{B} (r, g, b): (0, 170, 228)
- HSV (h, s, v): (195°, 100%, 89%)
- CIELCh_{uv} (L, C, h): (65, 75, 234°)
- Source: Gallego and Sanz
- ISCC–NBS descriptor: Brilliant greenish blue
- B: Normalized to [0–255] (byte)

Spanish sky blue is the colour that is called celeste (the Spanish word for "sky blue") in the Guía de coloraciones (Guide to colourations) by Rosa Gallego and Juan Carlos Sanz, a colour dictionary published in 2005 that is widely popular in the Hispanophone realm.

=== Dark sky blue ===
Dark sky blue

Colour coordinates
- Hex triplet: #8CBED6
- sRGB^{B} (r, g, b): (140, 190, 214)
- HSV (h, s, v): (199°, 35%, 84%)
- CIELCh_{uv} (L, C, h): (74, 36, 225°)
- ISCC–NBS descriptor: Light greenish blue
- B: Normalized to [0–255] (byte)

Displayed at right is the colour dark sky blue.

This is the colour called sky blue in Pantone.

The source of this colour is the "Pantone Textile Paper eXtended (TPX)" colour list, colour #14-4318 TPX—Sky Blue.

== In culture ==
=== Sports ===
- Argentina: Following the colours of the flag of Argentina, in which sky blue (celeste in Spanish) is the predominant colour, many Argentine sport teams feature the colour, including Racing Club de Avellaneda, Belgrano de Córdoba, Racing de Córdoba, Club Atlético Temperley, Atlético de Rafaela, Villa San Carlos, Gimnasia y Esgrima de Jujuy, Gimnasia y Tiro de Salta, and Gimnasia y Esgrima de Concepción del Uruguay. In addition, the Argentina national football team is known as the albicelestes due to the white-and-sky blue striping on their jerseys. This colour scheme is featured in other prominent national squads in popular sports such as rugby, field hockey, polo or volleyball.
- Australia: Sky blue is the main colour of the Australian rugby league team, New South Wales Blues, as it is the official colour of the state they represent.
- India: Sky Blue is the main colour of Indian national teams of various sports including Cricket, Football and Field Hockey.
- Formula One: The Benetton and its successor Renault team won the four drivers' and the constructors' World Championships of the squad with sky blue race cars, driven by Michael Schumacher at Benetton in 1994 and 1995 and Fernando Alonso at Renault in 2005 and 2006.
- Italy: Celeste is the main colour of the football teams Lazio of Rome and Napoli of Naples.
- Sweden: Football club Malmö FF, the club with the most Swedish championships, adopted sky blue shirts in 1920, which have been used for more than a century.
- United Kingdom: Two professional football clubs in England traditionally wear sky blue shirts. Manchester City adopted sky blue as the main colour of their home jersey in 1894 and have used that ever since then. Coventry City also have had sky blue as the primary colour since the 1960s and it is also the club nickname.
- Uruguay: The Uruguay national football team has worn a sky blue jersey since 1910, after Uruguayan club team River Plate F.C. wore sky blue while defeating contemporary Argentine powerhouse Alumni Athletic Club. The national team is nicknamed La Celeste. As in Argentina, a number of Uruguayan club teams use sky blue in their uniforms, such as C.A. Cerro, Montevideo City Torque, Club Oriental de Football, and Rocha F.C.

=== Colour associations ===
In English-speaking countries, the colour is associated with hope, aspiration and creativity; as reflected by idioms such as 'sky-blue thinking' and 'the sky's the limit'.

== See also ==
- Air Force blue
- Azure
- Bleu celeste (in heraldry)
- Haint blue
- List of colours
- Marian blue
- Shades of blue
- RAL 5015 Sky blue
