= Conca (river) =

Coordinates: 43.9723°N 12.7205°E

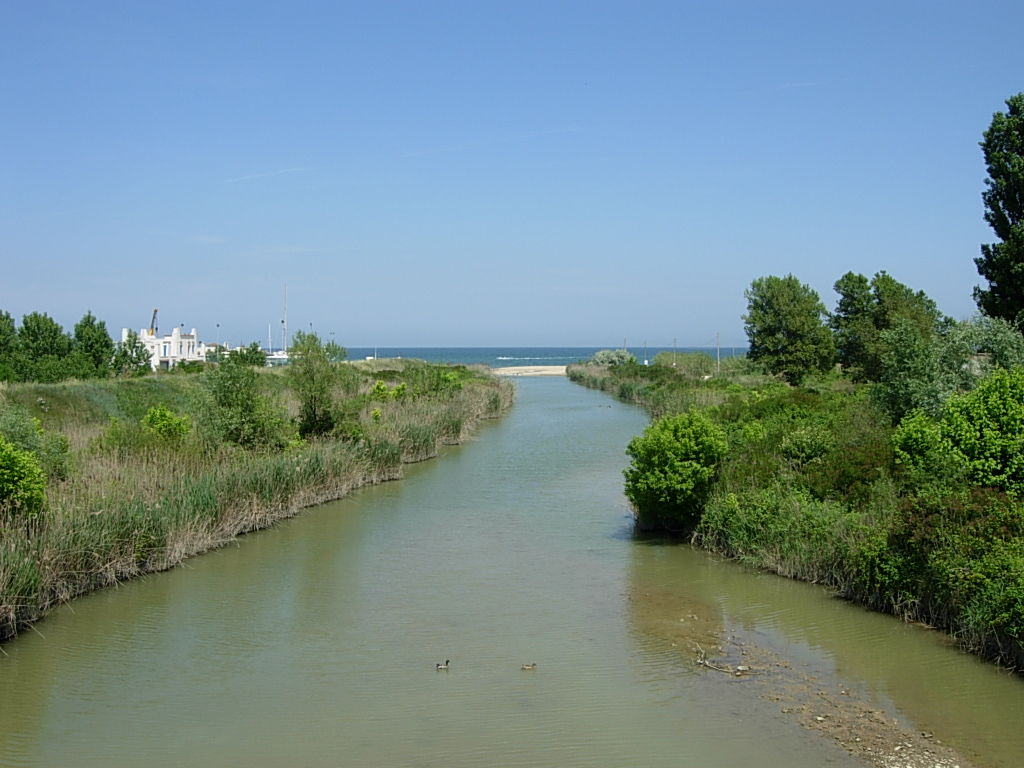
- The river at Misano Adriatico

Location
- Country: Italy

Physical characteristics
- Source
  - location: Monte Carpegna in Montefeltro
  - elevation: 1,200 m (3,900 ft)
- Mouth: Adriatic Sea
  - location: near Misano Adriatico
- Length: 47 km (29 mi)
- Discharge
  - average: 1.5 m^{3}/s (53 cu ft/s)

The Conca is a river in the Marche and Emilia-Romagna regions of Italy. Its source is Monte Carpegna, which is in the Montefeltro part of the province of Pesaro e Urbino. The river flows northeast near Macerata Feltria and Mercatino Conca before crossing into the province of Rimini. The river then flows past Morciano di Romagna before entering the Adriatic Sea southeast of Misano Adriatico and northwest of Cattolica.

== History ==
Historically, the valley formed by the Conca has formed a buffer region between the regions of Romagna and the Marche.

Known as the Crustumium rapax, the river formed the boundary between the Augustan subdivisions of Regio VIII Aemilia and Regio VI Umbria. In later centuries, the valley was frequently contested by the Byzantines, Goths, and Lombards, then by the Papal States and various empires controlling Romagna, and more recently in territorial changes between the Province of Rimini and the Province of Pesaro and Urbino.

During World War II, the British and their allies defeated the Germans in a battle near the Conca. The Conca was part of the German defenses known as the Gothic Line. This battle took place in 1944 and was known as Operation Olive.
