= Orazio Annibale della Molara =

17th-century Roman Catholic bishop

Most Reverend Orazio Annibale della Molara
- Bishop of Manfredonia
- Church: Catholic Church
- Archdiocese: Diocese of Manfredonia
- In office: 1630–1643
- Predecessor: André Caracciolo
- Successor: Antonio Marullo

Orders
- Consecration: 19 Mar 1630 by Luigi Caetani

Personal details
- Born: 10 Oct 1585 Rome, Italy
- Died: 7 May 1643 (age 57)

Orazio Annibale della Molara or Horatio Annibaldi della Molara (1585–1643) was a Roman Catholic prelate who served as Bishop of Manfredonia (1630–1643).

== Biography ==
Orazio Annibale della Molara was born on 10 Oct 1585 in Rome, Italy and ordained a deacon on 22 Feb 1611. On 18 Feb 1630, he was appointed during the papacy of Pope Urban VIII as Bishop of Manfredonia. On 19 Mar 1630, he was consecrated bishop by Luigi Caetani, Cardinal-Priest of Santa Pudenziana. He served as Bishop of Manfredonia until his death on 7 May 1643.

== External links and additional sources ==
- Cheney, David M. "Archdiocese of Manfredonia-Vieste-San Giovanni Rotondo". Catholic-Hierarchy.org. (for Chronology of Bishops) ^{[self-published]}
- Chow, Gabriel. "Archdiocese of Manfredonia-Vieste-San Giovanni Rotondo (Italy)". GCatholic.org. (for Chronology of Bishops) ^{[self-published]}

Catholic Church titles
Preceded by André Caracciolo	Bishop of Manfredonia; 1630–1643	Succeeded by Antonio Marullo
