= Pomponio Spreti =

17th-century Roman Catholic bishop

Most Reverend Pomponio Spreti
- Bishop of Cervia
- Church: Catholic Church
- Diocese: Diocese of Cervia
- In office: 1646–1652
- Predecessor: Francesco Maria Merlini
- Successor: Francesco Gheri

Orders
- Consecration: 14 Jan 1646 by Pier Luigi Carafa (seniore)

Personal details
- Born: 1595 Ravenna, Italy
- Died: 15 Nov 1652 (age 57)

Pomponio Spreti (1595–1652) was a Roman Catholic prelate who served as Bishop of Cervia (1646–1652).

== Biography ==
Pomponio Spreti was born in Ravenna, Italy in 1595. On 8 Jan 1646, he was appointed during the papacy of Pope Innocent X as Bishop of Cervia. On 14 Jan 1646, he was consecrated bishop by Pier Luigi Carafa (seniore), Cardinal-Priest of Santi Silvestro e Martino ai Monti, with Ranuccio Scotti Douglas, Bishop of Borgo San Donnino, and Ascanio Cassiani, Bishop of Andria, serving as co-consecrators. He served as Bishop of Cervia until his death on 15 Nov 1652.

While bishop, he was the principal co-consecrator of Giovanni Stefano Donghi, Bishop of Ajaccio.

== External links and additional sources ==
- Cheney, David M. "Diocese of Cervia". Catholic-Hierarchy.org. (for Chronology of Bishops) ^{[self-published]}
- Chow, Gabriel. "Diocese of Cervia (Italy)". GCatholic.org. (for Chronology of Bishops) ^{[self-published]}

Catholic Church titles
| Preceded by Francesco Maria Merlini | Bishop of Cervia; 1646–1652 | Succeeded by Francesco Gheri |
