= Antonio Marullo =

17th-century Roman Catholic bishop

Most Reverend Paolo Teutonico
- Archbishop of Manfredonia
- Church: Catholic Church
- Archdiocese: Archdiocese of Manfredonia
- In office: 1643–1648
- Predecessor: Orazio Annibale della Molara
- Successor: Paolo Teutonico

Orders
- Consecration: 20 Sep 1643 by Ulderico Carpegna

Personal details
- Born: Palermo, Italy
- Died: 18 December 1648

Antonio Marullo (... - December 18, 1648) was a Roman Catholic prelate who served as Archbishop of Manfredonia (1643–1648).

== Biography ==
Antonio Marullo was born in Palermo, Italy. On 31 Aug 1643, he was appointed during the papacy of Pope Urban VIII as Archbishop of Manfredonia. On 20 Sep 1643, he was consecrated bishop by Ulderico Carpegna, Cardinal-Priest of Sant'Anastasia, with Diego Sersale, Archbishop of Bari-Canosa, and Giovan Battista Foppa, Archbishop of Benevento, serving as co-consecrators. He served as Archbishop of Manfredonia until his death on 18 Dec 1648.

== External links and additional sources ==
- Cheney, David M. "Archdiocese of Manfredonia-Vieste-San Giovanni Rotondo". Catholic-Hierarchy.org. (for Chronology of Bishops) ^{[self-published]}
- Chow, Gabriel. "Archdiocese of Manfredonia-Vieste-San Giovanni Rotondo (Italy)". GCatholic.org. (for Chronology of Bishops) ^{[self-published]}

Catholic Church titles
Preceded by Orazio Annibale della Molara	Archbishop of Manfredonia; 1643–1648	Succeeded by Paolo Teutonico
