= Ottavio Branciforte =

17th-century Roman Catholic bishop

Most Reverend Ottavio Branciforte
- Bishop of Catania
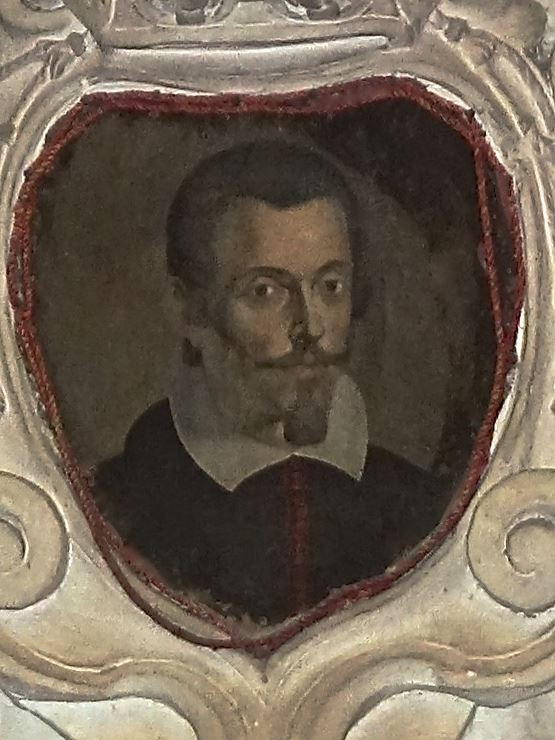
- Portrait of Branciforte by Giacinto Platania
- Church: Catholic Church
- Diocese: Diocese of Catania
- In office: 1638–1646
- Predecessor: Innocenzo Massimo
- Successor: Marco Antonio Gussio
- Previous post: Bishop of Cefalù

Personal details
- Born: 29 November 1599 Palermo, Italy
- Died: 14 June 1646 (aged 46) Acireale, Italy

Ottavio Branciforte (29 November 1599 – 14 June 1646) was a Roman Catholic prelate who served as Bishop of Cefalù and Bishop of Catania.

== Early life ==
Ottavio Branciforte was born in Palermo, Italy in 1599. He was the son of Ercole Branciforte, 1st Duke of San Giovanni and, his second wife, Agata Lanza. Among his siblings were brothers Antonio Branciforte, 1st Prince of Scordia, and Luigi Branciforte, who was Bishop of Melfi e Rapolla. From his mother's previous marriage, his elder half-brother was Niccolò Branciforte, 1st Prince of Leonforte.

== Career ==
On 10 January 1633, he was appointed during the papacy of Pope Urban VIII as Bishop of Cefalù and consecrated bishop by Cardinal Giovanni Battista Pamphilj, Cardinal-Priest of Sant'Eusebio on 16 January 1633. On 2 March 1638, he was appointed Bishop of Catania, serving until his death on 14 June 1646.

== External links and additional sources ==
- Cheney, David M. "Diocese of Cefalù". Catholic-Hierarchy.org. (for Chronology of Bishops) ^{[self-published]}
- Cheney, David M. "Diocese of Catania". Catholic-Hierarchy.org. (for Chronology of Bishops) ^{[self-published]}

Catholic Church titles
| Preceded by Manuel Esteban Muniera | Bishop of Cefalù; 1633–1638 | Succeeded by Pietro Corsetto |
| Preceded by Innocenzo Massimo | Bishop of Catania; 1638–1646 | Succeeded by Marco Antonio Gussio |
