= Ulderico Carpegna =

Italian jurist and Cardinal (1595–1679)

His Eminence Ulderico Carpegna
- Cardinal-Bishop of Porto e Santa Rufina
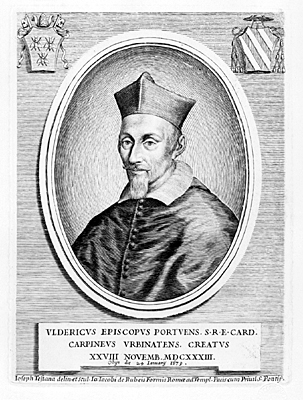
- Church: Roman Catholic Church
- Appointed: 28 January 1675
- Term ended: 24 January 1679
- Predecessor: Francesco Maria Brancaccio
- Successor: Cesare Facchinetti

Orders
- Consecration: 7 October 1630 by Luigi Caetani
- Created cardinal: 28 November 1633 by Urban VIII
- Rank: Cardinal-Bishop

Personal details
- Born: 24 June 1595 Scavolino, Italy
- Died: 24 January 1679 (age 83) Rome, Papal States
- Denomination: Roman Catholic

Ordination history of Ulderico Carpegna
History
Diaconal ordination
- Ordained by: Unknown
Priestly ordination
- Ordained by: Unknown
Episcopal consecration
- Principal consecrator: Luigi Caetani
- Co-consecrators: Antonio Ricciulli and Benedetto Landi
Cardinalate
- Elevated by: Pope Urban VIII
Episcopal succession
Bishops consecrated by Ulderico Carpegna as principal consecrator
- Orazio Monaldi: 15 May 1639
- Antonio Marullo: 20 September 1643
- Pietro Marioni: 3 May 1644
- Antonio Pavonelli, O.F.M. Conv.: 24 May 1648
- Francesco Maria Falcucci: 8 January 1651
- Paluzzo Paluzzi Altieri degli Albertoni: 2 May 1666
- Peter Creagh: 26 May 1676

Ulderico Carpegna (24 June 1595 – 24 January 1679) was an Italian jurist and Cardinal.

== Early life ==
Born at Scavolino, he was from a family of the Roman nobility, connected with the Montefeltro family. He was the son of Tommaso di Carpegna, Count of Carpegna (1560–1610), and Vittoria Landriani (1571–1641). Among his siblings was Bishop Pietro Carpegna (1592–1630). His mother was a half-sister to Ercole Branciforte, 1st Duke of San Giovanni.

== Career ==
He succeeded his elder brother Pietro to become Bishop of Gubbio in 1630, and Cardinal in 1633. He was Bishop of Todi from 1638, resigning by 1643. He was Camerlengo for a year from 1648. Consecrated by Luigi Caetani, he became Bishop of Albano in 1666, Bishop of Frascati in 1671, and Bishop of Porto and Santa Rufina in 1675. He died in Rome. Through his episcopal consecration of Paluzzo Paluzzi Altieri degli Albertoni, he is part of the episcopal lineage of Pope Francis. He is also connected to the lineage of Pope Benedict XVI.

Carpegna was a patron of Francesco Borromini and commissioned the Baroque architect important works of transformation and expansion of his palace at Fontana di Trevi. As a token of gratitude, Borromini named the prelate executor of his will and bequeathed him money and objects of considerable value "for", as he wrote, "the infinite debt I have toward him".

The Fondo Carpegna of the Vatican Secret Archives contains material relating to Ulderico Carpegna and Gaspare Carpegna.

== Episcopal succession ==
Episcopal succession of Ulderico Carpegna

While bishop, he was the principal consecrator of:

- Orazio Monaldi, Bishop of Gubbio (1639);
- Antonio Marullo, Archbishop of Manfredonia (1643);
- Pietro Marioni, Bishop of Telese o Cerreto Sannita (1644);
- Antonio Pavonelli, Bishop of Venosa (1648);
- Francesco Maria Falcucci, Bishop of Calvi Risorta (1651);
- Paluzzo Paluzzi Altieri Degli Albertoni, Bishop of Corneto e Montefiascone (1666); and
- Peter Creagh, Bishop of Cork and Cloyne (1676).

and the principal co-consecrator of:

- Arcasio Ricci, Bishop of Gravina di Puglia (1630).
