= Thomas de Grace =

Most Reverend Thomas de Grace
- Titular Bishop of Dionysias; Auxiliary Bishop of Liège
- Church: Catholic Church
- Diocese: Diocese of Liège
- In office: 1628–1636
- Predecessor: Stephen Strecheus
- Successor: Henri Sylvius

Orders
- Ordination: 22 Sep 1607
- Consecration: 1629 by Pier Luigi Carafa

Personal details
- Born: 1584 Grace, France
- Died: 4 Aug 1636 (age 52) Liège, Belgium

Thomas de Grace (1584–1636) was a Roman Catholic prelate who served as Titular Bishop of Dionysias (1628–1636) and Auxiliary Bishop of Liège (1628–1636).

== Biography ==
Thomas de Grace was born in Grace, France in 1584 and ordained a priest in the Diocese of Liège on 22 Sep 1607. On 11 Dec 1628, he was appointed during the papacy of Pope Urban VIII as Titular Bishop of Dionysias and Auxiliary Bishop of Liège. in 1629, he was consecrated bishop by Pier Luigi Carafa, Bishop of Tricarico. He served as Auxiliary Bishop of Liège until his death on 4 Aug 1636.

Catholic Church titles
Preceded by Stephen Strecheus	Titular Bishop of Dionysias; 1628–1636	Succeeded by Henri Sylvius
Preceded by	Auxiliary Bishop of Liège; 1628–1636	Succeeded by
