= Diocese of Cervia =

Roman Catholic diocese in Italy

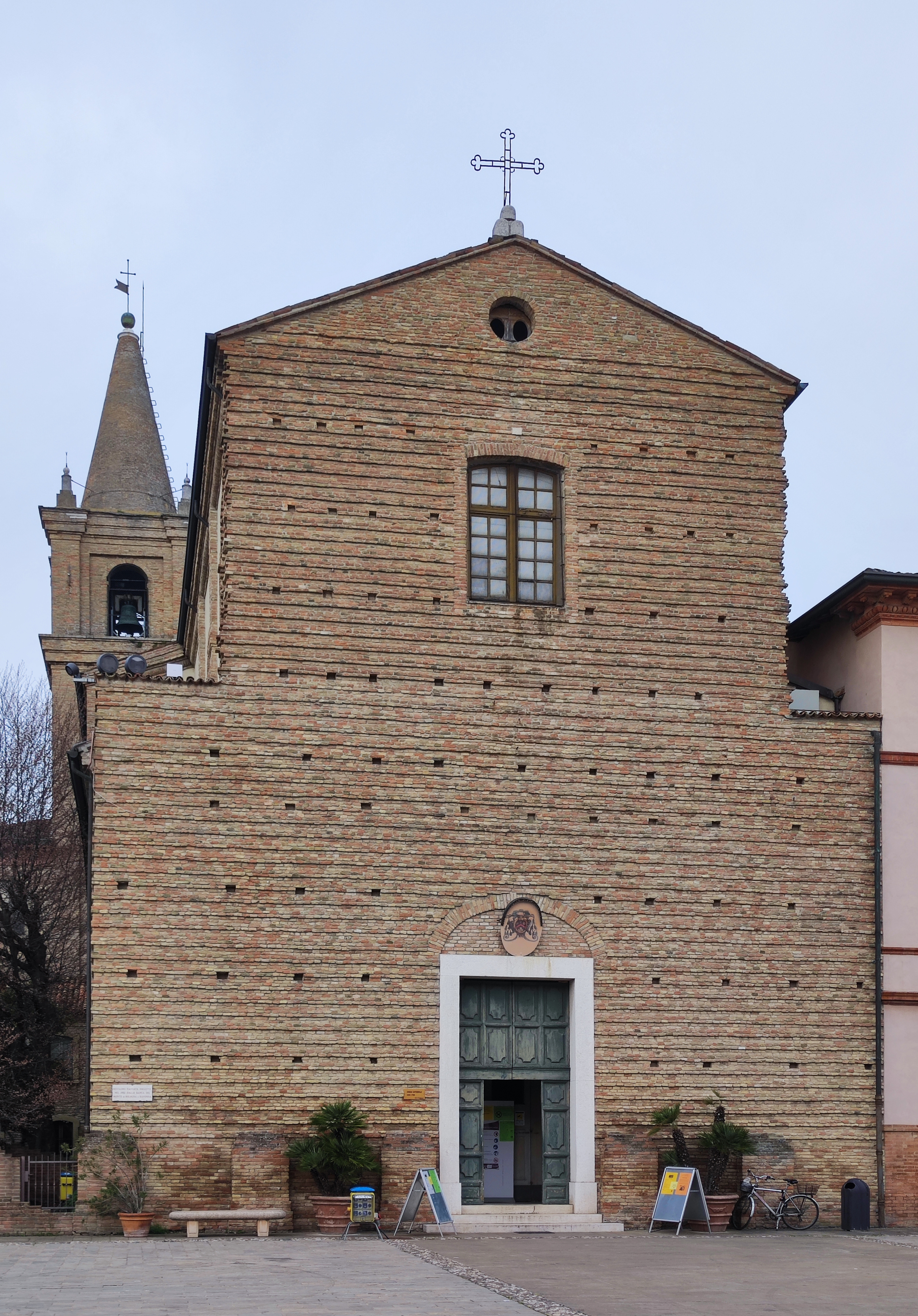
Cathedral of S. Maria di Cervia now a Co-cathedral

The diocese of Cervia was a Roman Catholic diocese in Emilia-Romagna. The diocese was a suffragan of the Archdiocese of Ravenna. In 1947, it merged with the archdiocese of Ravenna to form the Archdiocese of Ravenna-Cervia.

== History ==
Cervia is a city in the province of Ravenna, Italy, on the ancient Via Flaminia 26.0 km (16.2 mi) south-southeast of Ravenna, in a marshy district near the Adriatic Sea. The town and the diocese were originally called Ficocle (or FIcoclia). In the middle of the 4th century the name was changed to Cervia, though the bishops regularly continued to use the old name. The diocese was a suffragan of Ravenna, according to a document of Pope Gregory I (590–604) now regarded as spurious. It was actually directly subject to the papacy. Pope Agapitus II, in October 948, made Cervia a suffragan of Ravenna. That suffragan status was confirmed by Pope Calixtus II on 7 January 1121, in the bull "Etsi Universae".

The first known Bishop of Cervia was Gerontius. According to his legend, he was returning with Viticanus, Bishop of Cagli, from the Roman council held in 501 to treat accusations made against Pope Symmachus, when he was assaulted and killed by bandits. The legend says "heretics", perhaps Goths, or more probably Heruli, of the army of Odoacer. His remains are preserved at Cagli. He is venerated as a martyr, and is commemorated in the liturgical calendar on May 9.

In 708, the city of Cagli was destroyed by a fire. It was slowly rebuilt.

According to Bonizo of Sutri, a bishop of Cervia participated in the enthronement of the Antipope Clement III (Wibert, Archbishop of Ravenna) in the Lateran Basilica in Rome on 28 June 1083: "a Mutinensie episcopo et a Bononiensi episcopo et a Cerviensis." The manuscript reading, however, is Cueniensi. No other author names a bishop of Cervia. Gebhard of Salzburg names only two bishops; likewise, Bernoldus of Konstanz.

During the episcopate of Bishop Rusticus (1219), in 1224 Cervia was placed under an interdict for its maltreatment of a certain Gerardus, an envoy of the Archbishop of Ravenna. They also abused a procurator of bishop Egidio of Forlimpopoli, who had been sent to announce the interdict.

Other bishops worth mention were: Bishop Joannes (c. 858–881), who was sent on a diplomatic mission by Pope Nicholas I to the court of King Lothair II of Lotharingia; the Venetian Pietro Barbo (1440), later Pope Paul II; Alfonso Visconti (1591–1601), who had been nuncio to the emperor (1589–1591) and to Transylvania (1595–1596); and Bonifacio Bevilacqua (1601–1627), named a Cardinal by Pope Clement VIII on 3 March 1599, and a friend of Pope Gregory XV (Ludovisi), who made him Duke of Fornano.

In 1484, the town of Cervia was destroyed by an earthquake. The Major Council of Ravenna discussed rebuilding the town.

Bishop Ottavio Santacroce (1576–1581) held a diocesan synod in 1577.

On 16 June 1641, Cervia was heavily damaged by a major earthquake. In expiation, the bishop and magistrates instituted an annual procession from the city to Santa Maria del Pino, bearing the remains of the martyr S. Rogatus.

In 1766, the city of Cervia, which was subject to the civil jurisdiction of the papacy in the legation of the Romandiola, contained around 800 persons.

The cathedral of Cervia was dedicated to the taking up of the body (Assumption) of the Virgin Mary into heaven. It was administered and staffed by a corporation called the Chapter, consisting of two dignities (the Archdeacon and the Provost) and eight canons.

In the 19th century, the diocese was composed of only 12 parishes, the entire city of Cervia composing one of those parishes.

On 22 February 1947, the diocese of Cervia was suppressed, and its territory incorporated into the archdiocese of Ravenna.

== Bishops ==
Erected: 6th Century
Metropolitan: Archdiocese of Ravenna

=== to 1300 ===
- Gerontius of Cervia, († 501)
- Severus (attested 591-599)
- Bonus (attested 649)

...

- Adrianus (attested 853)
- Joannes (attested 858–881)

...

- Stephanus (attested 967–969)

...

- Leo (attested 997–1035)

...

- Joannes (attested 1040–1053)

...

- Bonus (attested 1057–1061)
- Lucidus (attested 1066)
- Ildeprandus (attested 1073–1080)

...

- Ugo (attested 1106)
- Joannes (attested 1109)

...

- Petrus (attested 1126–1153)

...

- Manfredus (attested 1163)
- Albertus (attested 1166–1173)
- Ugo (attested 1174–1175)

...

- Thebaldus (attested 1187-1193)

...

- Albertus (attested 1198–1200)
- Simeon (attested 1204–1217)
- Rusticus (attested 1219, 1223)
- Joannes (attested 1229–1253)
- Ubaldus (1257–1259)

Sede vacante (1264–1266)

- Thomas (1266–1270)
- Theodoricus Borgognoni, O.P. (1270–1298)
- Antonienus, O.Min. (1299– )

=== 1300 to 1600 ===
- Matthaeus (attested 1307–1311)
- Guido Gennari (1317– )
- Franciscus (attested 1320)
- Gerardus (Geraldus) (1324-1329)
- Superantius Lambertuzzi (1329–1342)
- Guadagno da Majolo, O.F.M. (1342 – 1364)
- Joannes (1364–1369)
- Bernardo Guascone, O.F.M. (29 Mar 1370 – 1374)
- Astorgius de Brason (1374– )
- Joannes de Vivensi (attested 1381–1382)
- Guilelmus Alidosi
- Joannes
- Menendus, O.Min. (c. 1388) Administrator
- Pinus Ordelaffi (1394–1402) Roman Obedience
- Paulus (1402–1413)
- Maynard de Contrariis (2 Apr 1414 – 1431 Resigned)
- Cristoforo di San Marcello (2 May 1431 – 21 Nov 1435 Appointed, Bishop of Rimini)
- Antonio Correr (cardinal), C.R.S.A. (Nov 1435 – 1440 Resigned)
- Pietro Barbo (1 Jul 1440 – 19 Jun 1451 Resigned)
- Isidore of Kiev (10 Jun 1451 – 15 Mar 1455 Resigned)
- Francesco Portio (15 Mar 1455 – 1474 Died)
- Achille Marescotti (9 Jan 1475 – 20 Nov 1485 Died)
- Tommaso Catanei, O.P. (12 Dec 1485 – 1513 Resigned)
- Pietro de Flisco (1513 – 1525)
- Paolo Emilio Cesi (1525 – 23 Mar 1528 Resigned) Administrator
- Octavio de Cesi (23 Mar 1528 – 1534)
- Giovanni Andrea Cesi (13 Nov 1534 – 11 Mar 1545 Appointed, Bishop of Todi)
- Federico Cesi (11 Mar 1545 – 23 Mar 1545 Resigned)
- Scipione Santacroce (23 Mar 1545 – 1576 Resigned)
- Ottavio Santacroce (18 Jul 1576 – 1581)
- Lorenzo Campeggi (8 Jan 1582 – 6 Nov 1585)
- Decio Azzolini (seniore) (15 Nov 1585 – 7 Oct 1587)
- Annibal Pauli (12 Oct 1587 – 1590 Died)
- Alfonso Visconti, C.O. (1591 – 1601)

=== 1600 to 1947 ===
- Bonifazio Bevilacqua Aldobrandini (10 Sep 1601 – 7 Apr 1627)
- Giovanni Francesco Guidi di Bagno (1627 – 1635)
- Francesco Maria Merlini (17 Sep 1635 – Nov 1644)
- Pomponio Spreti (8 Jan 1646 – 15 Nov 1652)
- Francesco Gheri (31 May 1655 – 1662).
- Anselmo Dandini (26 Jun 1662 – Dec 1664)
- Gerolamo Santolini (15 Jun 1665 – Mar 1667)
- Gianfrancesco Riccamonti, O.S.B. (4 Apr 1668 – 17 Apr 1707)
- Camillo Spreti (15 Apr 1709 – Jan 1727)
- Gaspare Pizzolanti, O. Carm. (25 Jun 1727 – 31 Dec 1765)
- Giambattista Donati (2 Jun 1766 – 1792)

Sede vacante (1792–1795)

- Bonaventura Gazzola, O.F.M. Ref. (1795 – 1820)
- Giuseppe Crispino Mazzotti (1820 – 1825)
- Ignazio Giovanni Cadolini (3 Jul 1826 – 1831)
- Mariano Baldassare Medici, O.P. (17 Dec 1832 – 1 Oct 1833 Died)
- Innocenzo Castracane degli Antelminelli (1834 – 1838)
- Gaetano Balletti (12 Feb 1838 – 11 May 1842 Died)
- Gioacchino Tamburini (Tamberini) (22 Jul 1842 – 13 Oct 1859 Died)
- Giovanni Monetti (23 Mar 1860 – 15 Feb 1877 Died)
- Federico Foschi (20 Mar 1877 – 7 Oct 1908 Died)
- Pasquale Morganti, O.Ss.C.A. (7 Jan 1909 – 18 Dec 1921 Died)
- Antonio Lega (18 Dec 1921 Succeeded – 16 Nov 1946 Died)

== Bibliography ==
=== Reference works for bishops ===
- Gams, Pius Bonifatius (1873). Series episcoporum Ecclesiae catholicae: quotquot innotuerunt a beato Petro apostolo (in Latin). Ratisbon: Typis et Sumptibus Georgii Josephi Manz. pp. 739-741.
- Eubel, Conradus, ed. (1913). Hierarchia catholica (in Latin). Vol. 1 (Tomus I) (second ed.). Münster: Libreria Regensbergiana. (in Latin)
- Eubel, Conradus, ed. (1914). Hierarchia catholica (in Latin). Vol. 2 (Tomus II) (second ed.). Münster: Libreria Regensbergiana.
- Eubel, Conradus; Gulik, Guilelmus, eds. (1923). Hierarchia catholica (in Latin). Vol. 3 (Tomus III) (second ed.). Münster: Libreria Regensbergiana.
- Gauchat, Patritius (Patrice) (1935). Hierarchia catholica. Vol. 4 (Tomus IV) (1592–1667). Münster: Libraria Regensbergiana.
- Ritzler, Remigius; Sefrin, Pirminus (1952). Hierarchia catholica medii et recentis aevi. Vol. 5 (Tomus V) (1667–1730). Patavii: Messagero di S. Antonio.
- Ritzler, Remigius; Sefrin, Pirminus (1958). Hierarchia catholica medii et recentis aevi. Vol. 6 (Tomus VI) (1730–1799). Patavii: Messagero di S. Antonio.
- Ritzler, Remigius; Sefrin, Pirminus (1968). Hierarchia Catholica medii et recentioris aevi (in Latin). Vol. VII (1800–1846). Monasterii: Libreria Regensburgiana.
- Remigius Ritzler; Pirminus Sefrin (1978). Hierarchia catholica Medii et recentioris aevi (in Latin). Vol. VIII (1846–1903). Il Messaggero di S. Antonio.
- Pięta, Zenon (2002). Hierarchia catholica medii et recentioris aevi (in Latin). Vol. IX (1903–1922). Padua: Messagero di San Antonio. ISBN 978-88-250-1000-8.

=== Studies ===
- Cappelletti, Giuseppe (1844). Le chiese d'Italia dalla loro origine sino ai nostri giorni. Volume 2. Venice: G. Antonelli, 1844.
- Kehr, Paul Fridolin (1906). Italia Pontificia Vol. V: Aemilia, sive Provincia Ravennas. (in Latin). Berlin: Weidmann. Pp. 113-115.
- Schwartz, Gerhard (1907). Die Besetzung der Bistümer Reichsitaliens unter den sächsischen und salischen Kaisern: mit den Listen der Bischöfe, 951-1122. Leipzig: B.G. Teubner. pp. 166-167. (in German)
- Ughelli, Ferdinando; Coleti, Niccolo (1717). Italia sacra sive de Episcopis Italiae (in Latin). Vol. 2 (Tomus secundus) (secunda ed.). Venice: Sebastian Coleti. pp. 467–481.
- Zattoni, Girolamo (1903). La cronotassi dei vescovi di Cervia. (in Italian). Ravenna, 1903.
