= Spadafora =

Spadafora Spathofòra (Greek)
- Comune
- Comune di Spadafora
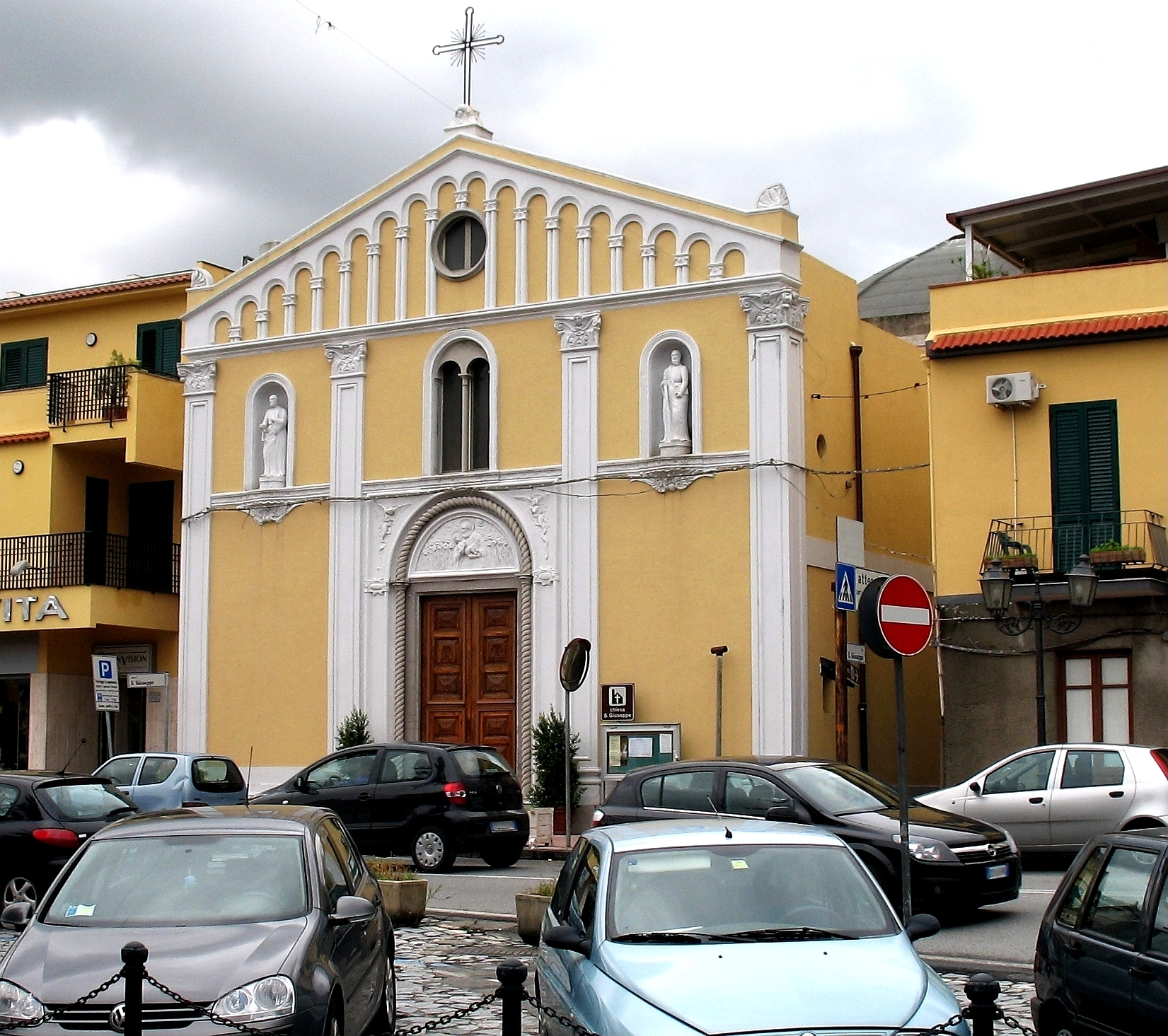
- St. Joseph Church

- Coat of arms

- Location within Italy Location within Sicily
- Coordinates: 38°13′25″N 15°22′44″E
- Country: Italy
- Region: Sicily
- Metropolitan city: Messina (ME)
- Frazioni: Grangiara, San Martino, Arcipretato, Verdesca

Government
  - Mayor: Giuseppe Pappalardo

Area
  - Total: 10.3 km^{2} (4.0 sq mi)
- Elevation: 6 m (20 ft)

Population (31 December 2014)
  - Total: 5,081
  - Density: 493/km^{2} (1,280/sq mi)
- Demonym: Spadaforesi
- Time zone: UTC+1 (CET)
  - Summer (DST): UTC+2 (CEST)
- Postal code: 98048
- Dialing code: 090
- Patron saint: Saint Joseph
- Saint day: 19 March
- Website: Official website

Spadafora (Sicilian: Spatafora) is a comune (municipality) in the Metropolitan City of Messina in the Italian region Sicily, located about 180 km (110 mi) east of Palermo and about 15 km (9 mi) northwest of Messina.

Spadafora borders the following municipalities: Roccavaldina, Rometta, Venetico.

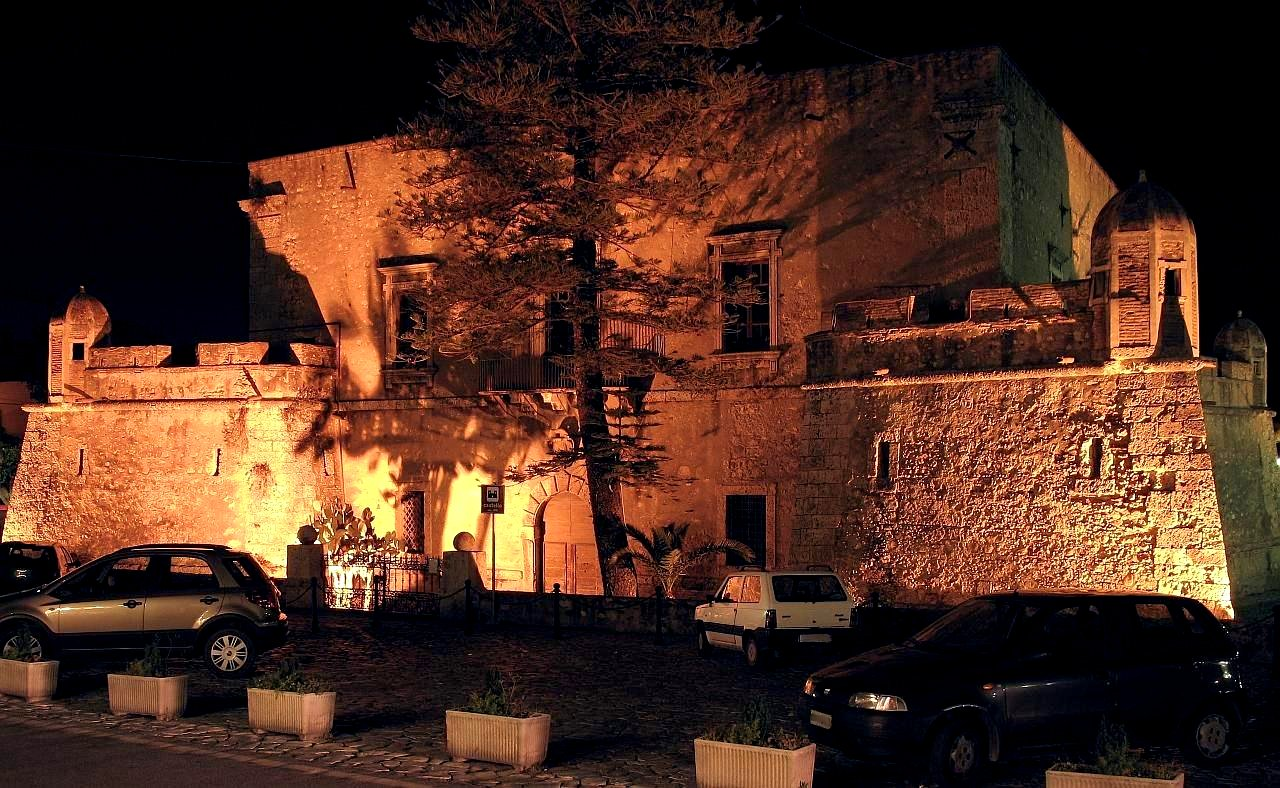
The castle
