= Monte Carpegna =

Mountain in Italy

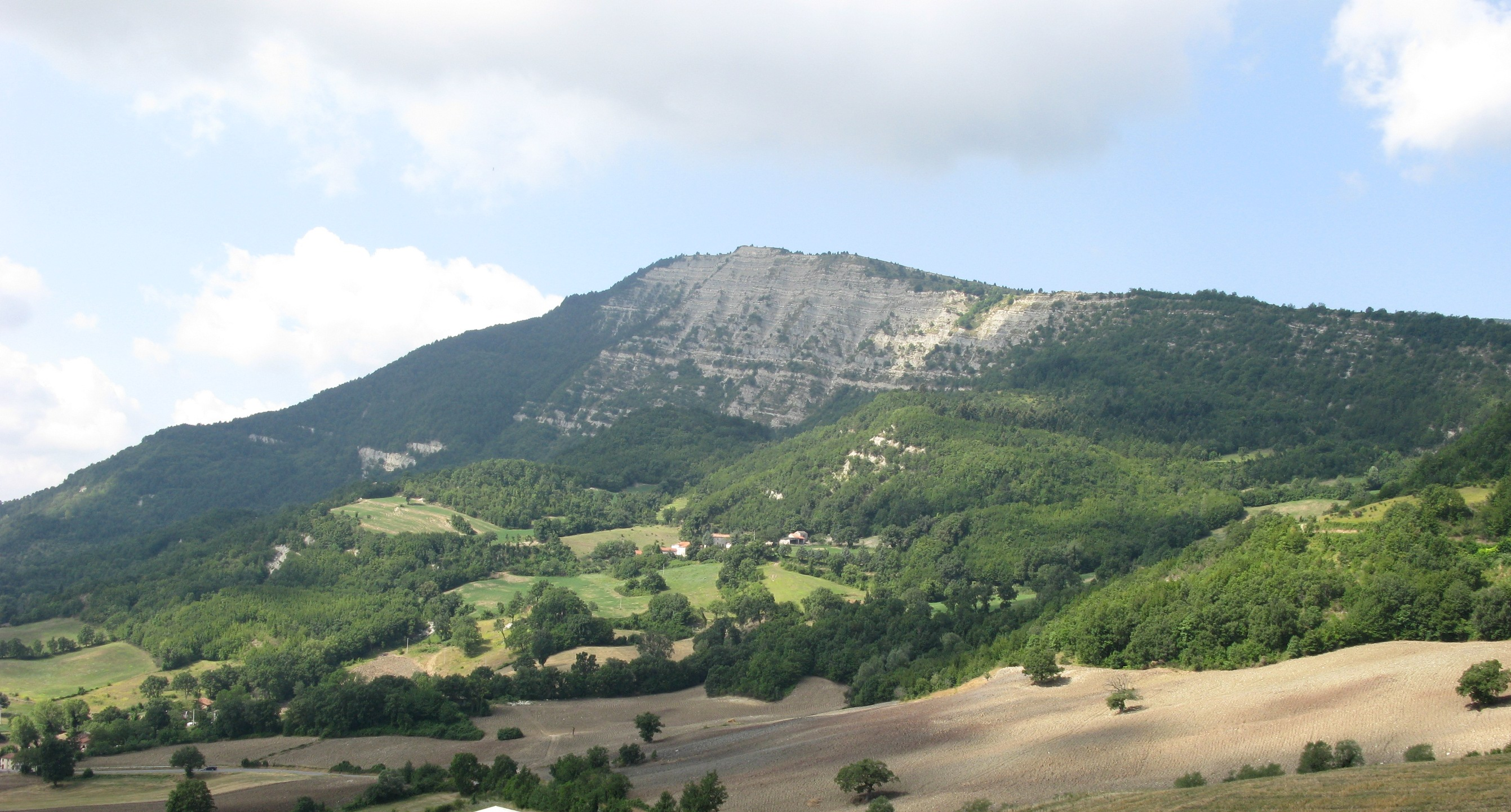

Highest point
- Elevation: 1,415 m (4,642 ft)
- Prominence: 435 m (1,427 ft)
- Isolation: 20.13 km (12.51 mi)
- Coordinates: 43°48′04″N 12°19′13″E

Geography
- Location within Italy
- Location: Marche, Italy
- Parent range: Apennines

Monte Carpegna is a mountain of Marche, Italy. It is the source of the Conca river.
