= Francesco Carafa della Spina di Traetto =

Italian cardinal

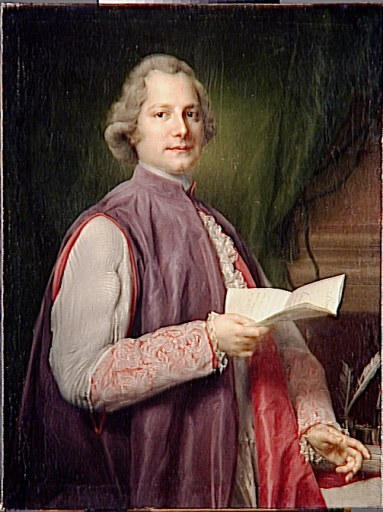
Francesco Carafa gella Spina di Traetto

Francesco Carafa della Spina di Traetto (29 April 1722, Naples - 20 September 1818, Rome) was an Italian cardinal.

== Family ==
He belonged to the family of pope Paul IV and of pope Paul V via his mother. He was the great-great uncle of cardinal Domenico Carafa della Spina di Traetto (1844). The other cardinals in the family were Filippo Carafa della Serra (1378), Oliviero Carafa (1467), Gianvincenzo Carafa (1527), Carlo Carafa (1555), Diomede Carafa (1555); Alfonso Carafa (1557), Antonio Carafa (1568), Decio Carafa (1611), Pier Luigi Carafa (1645), Carlo Carafa della Spina (1664), Fortunato Ilario Carafa della Spina (1686), Marino Carafa di Belvedere (1801) and Domenico Carafa della Spina di Traetto (1844).

== Life ==
He was made titular archbishop of Patras in 1760, before being sent to the Republic of Venice as Apostolic Nuncio. He became secretary to the Congregation of Bishops in 1766.

He was made a cardinal by pope Clement XIV in the consistory of 19 April 1773. He took part in the papal conclave of 1774 which elected pope Pius VI and that of 1799-1800 which elected pope Pius VII. He was then made prefect of the Congregation of Bishops and sent as legate to Ferrara. He was imprisoned by the French and finally banished to Naples.

He was a member of the Congregzione deputata per gli acquisti fatti nel tempo della rivoluzione. During the French occupation of Rome between 1809 and 1814, he took refuge in the convent of Saint Philip of Neri Montalbaddo in Marches.
