= Spadafora (surname) =

Spadafora is a surname. Notable people with the surname include:

- David Spadafora, American historian
- Domenico Spadafora (1450–1521), Italian Roman Catholic priest
- Hugo Spadafora (1940–1985), Italian-Panamanian physician and guerrilla fighter
- Paul Spadafora (born 1975), American boxer
- Ronald Spadafora (1954–2018), American firefighter

== See also ==
- Spadafora family
