= Pietro Carpegna =

Most Reverend Pietro Carpegna
- Bishop of Gubbio
- Church: Catholic Church
- Diocese: Diocese of Gubbio
- In office: 1628–1630
- Predecessor: Alessandro Del Monte
- Successor: Ulderico Carpegna

Orders
- Consecration: 6 January 1629 by Antonio Marcello Barberini

Personal details
- Born: 1592 Scaolini, Italy
- Died: 19 June 1630 (age 38) Gubbio, Italy

Pietro Carpegna or Petrus de Carpinea (1592 – 19 June 1630) was a Roman Catholic prelate who served as Bishop of Gubbio (1628–1630).

== Early life ==
Pietro Carpegna was born in Scaolini, Italy in 1592. He was the son of Tommaso di Carpegna, Count of Carpegna (1560–1610), and Vittoria Landriani (1571–1641). Among his siblings was Cardinal Ulderico Carpegna. His mother was a half-sister to Ercole Branciforte, 1st Duke of San Giovanni.

== Career ==
On 11 December 1628, he was appointed during the papacy of Pope Urban VIII as Bishop of Gubbio. On 6 January 1629, he was consecrated bishop by Antonio Marcello Barberini, Cardinal-Priest of Sant'Onofrio, serving as co-consecrators. He served as Bishop of Gubbio until his death on 19 June 1630.

== Personal life ==
Carpegna died in Gubbio, Italy on 19 June 1630.

Catholic Church titles
Preceded by Alessandro Del Monte	Bishop of Gubbio; 1628–1630	Succeeded by Ulderico Carpegna
