= Antonino Spatafora =

Italian painter and architect

Antonino (born Antonio) Spatafora (died 22 June 1613) was an Italian painter, architect, sculptor and cartographer. Born in Palermo, Sicily in the mid 16th century, he is notable as one of the foremost artists of Sicilian Mannerism, with pupils including Vincenzo La Barbera. Several documents refer to him as a sculptor, though none of his sculptures survive. He died in Termini Imerese, Sicily.

== Bibliography (in Italian) ==
- Ignazio De Michele, Cenni sopra un affresco attribuito a Giuseppe Spatafora e sopra alcune pitture di Vincenzo La Barbera, Termini Imerese 1877.
- Claudia Guastella, Ricerche su Giuseppe Alvino detto il Sozzo e la pittura a Palermo alla fine del Cinquecento, in AA.VV., Contributi alla storia della cultura figurativa nella Sicilia occidentale tra la fine del XVI e gli inizi del XVII secolo, atti della giornata di studio su Pietro D'Asaro, Racalmuto Auditorium di S. Chiara 15 febbraio 1985, Palermo.
- Rosario Termotto Collesano La Basilica di S. Pietro, 1992, Collesano.
- Antonio Contino and Salvatore Mantia, Un felice connubio artistico: La Barbera-Spatafora in "Le Madonie" anno LXXVI n. 3, 1º marzo 1997, p. 3.
- Antonio Contino & Salvatore Mantia, - Vincenzo La Barbera Architetto e Pittore Termitano, Termini Imerese, ed. GASM, 1998, 150 p., 14 figg., appendici.
- Antonio Contino & Salvatore Mantia, Architetti e pittori a Termini Imerese tra il XVI ed il XVII secolo, ed GASM, Termini Imerese, 2001, 190 p., 9 figg., appendici.
