= Gerontius of Cervia =

Italian bishop and saint

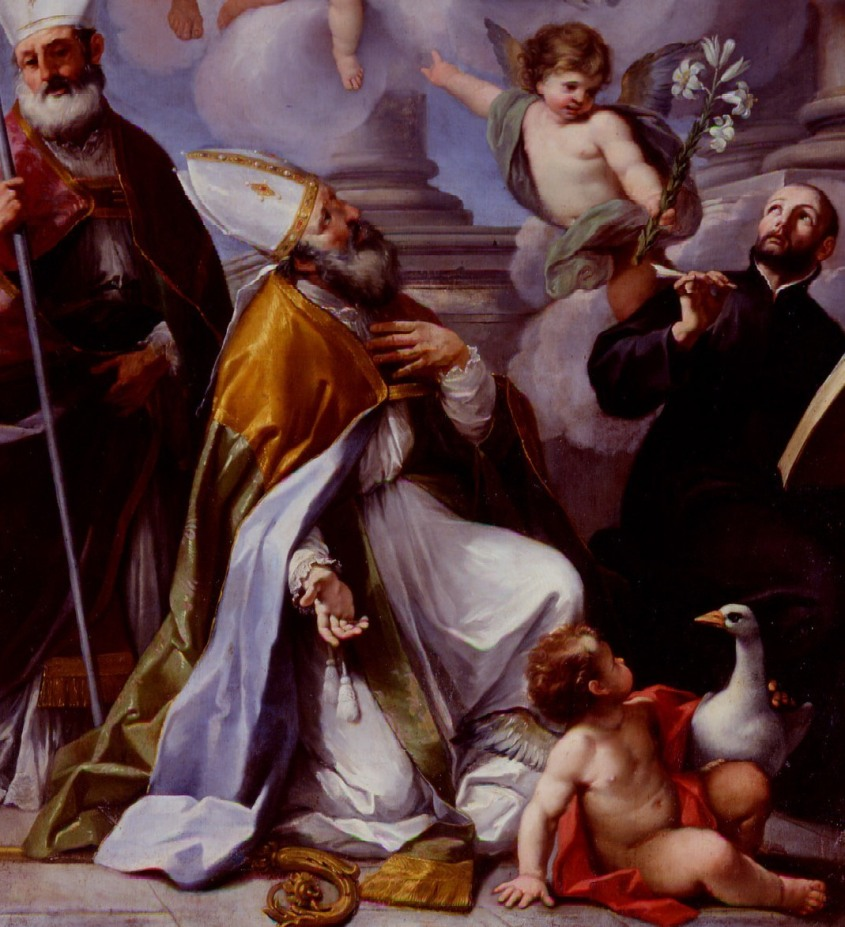

Gerontius of Cervia (Gerontius of Ficocle) (died 501 AD) was an Italian bishop of Cervia who is venerated as a saint.

== Life ==
The first known Bishop of Cervia is Gerontius. He was returning with Viticanus, Bishop of Cagli, from the Roman council held in 501 to treat accusations made against Pope Symmachus, when he was assaulted and killed by bandits on the Via Flaminia at Cagli, near Ancona. (The legend says "heretics", perhaps Goths, or more probably Heruli, of the army of Odoacer.) His remains are venerated at Cagli.

He was venerated as a martyr. His feast day is May 9. His emblem in art is a goose.

== Sources ==
- Cappelletti, Giuseppe (1844). Le chiese d'Italia dalla loro origine sino ai nostri giorni. Volume 2. Venice: G. Antonelli, 1844.
- Lanzoni, Francesco (1927). Le diocesi d'Italia dalle origini al principio del secolo VII (an. 604). Faenza: F. Lega. (in Italian)
