= Carlo d'Aragona Tagliavia =

Sicilian-Spanish nobleman and viceroy

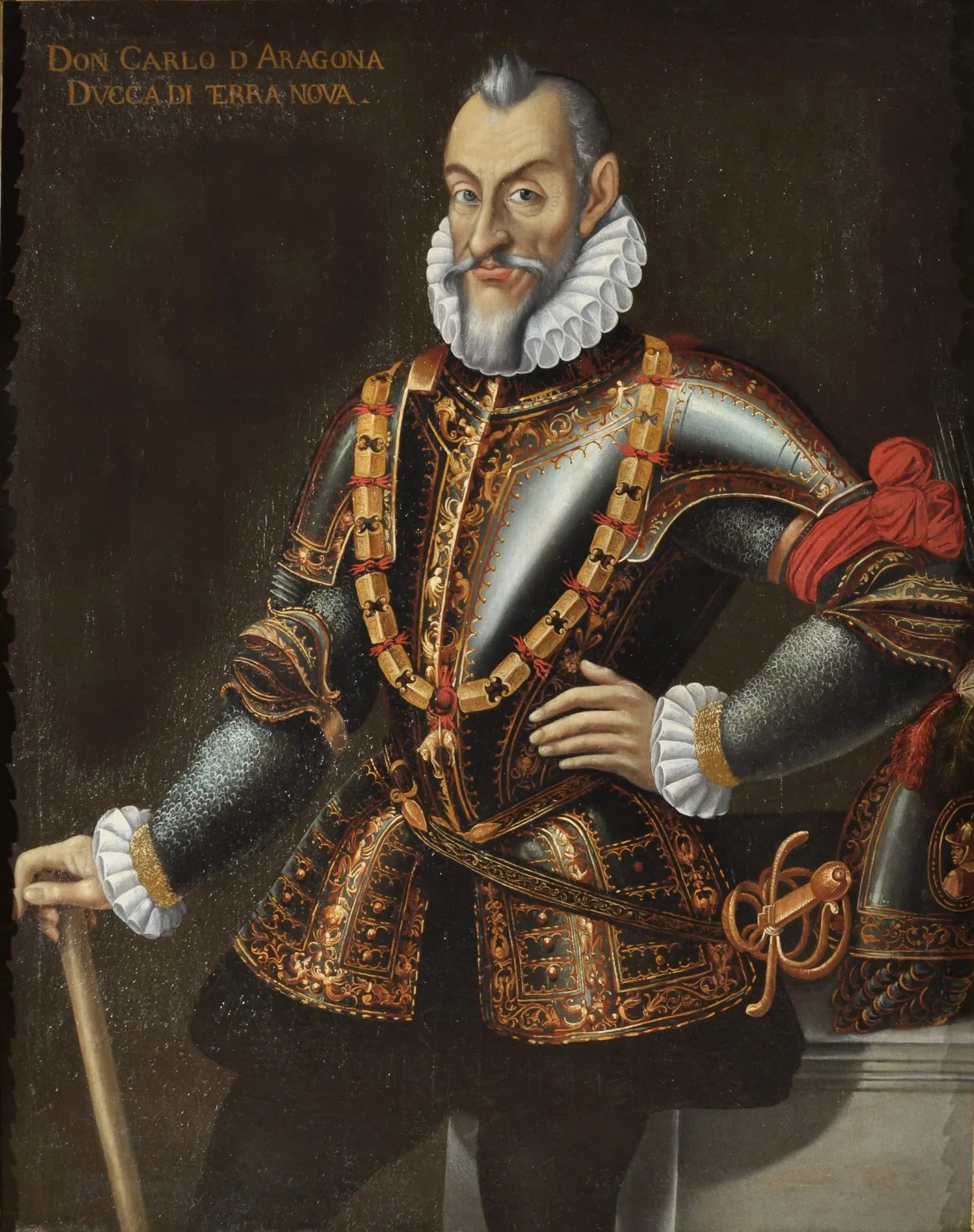

Carlo d'Aragona Tagliavia, 1st Prince of Castelvetrano (1530 – 25 September 1599) was a Sicilian-Spanish nobleman and viceroy.

== Early life ==
Carlo was born in Castelvetrano, Sicily, in 1530. He was the son of a Sicilian peer, Giovanni Tagliavia, Count of Castelvetrano, and a Spanish mother, Beatriz de Aragón y Cruillas, only daughter of Carlos de Aragon, Marquess of Avola. His uncle was Cardinal Pietro Tagliavia d'Aragonia. His family descended from an illegitimate son of King Peter III of Aragon.

== Career ==
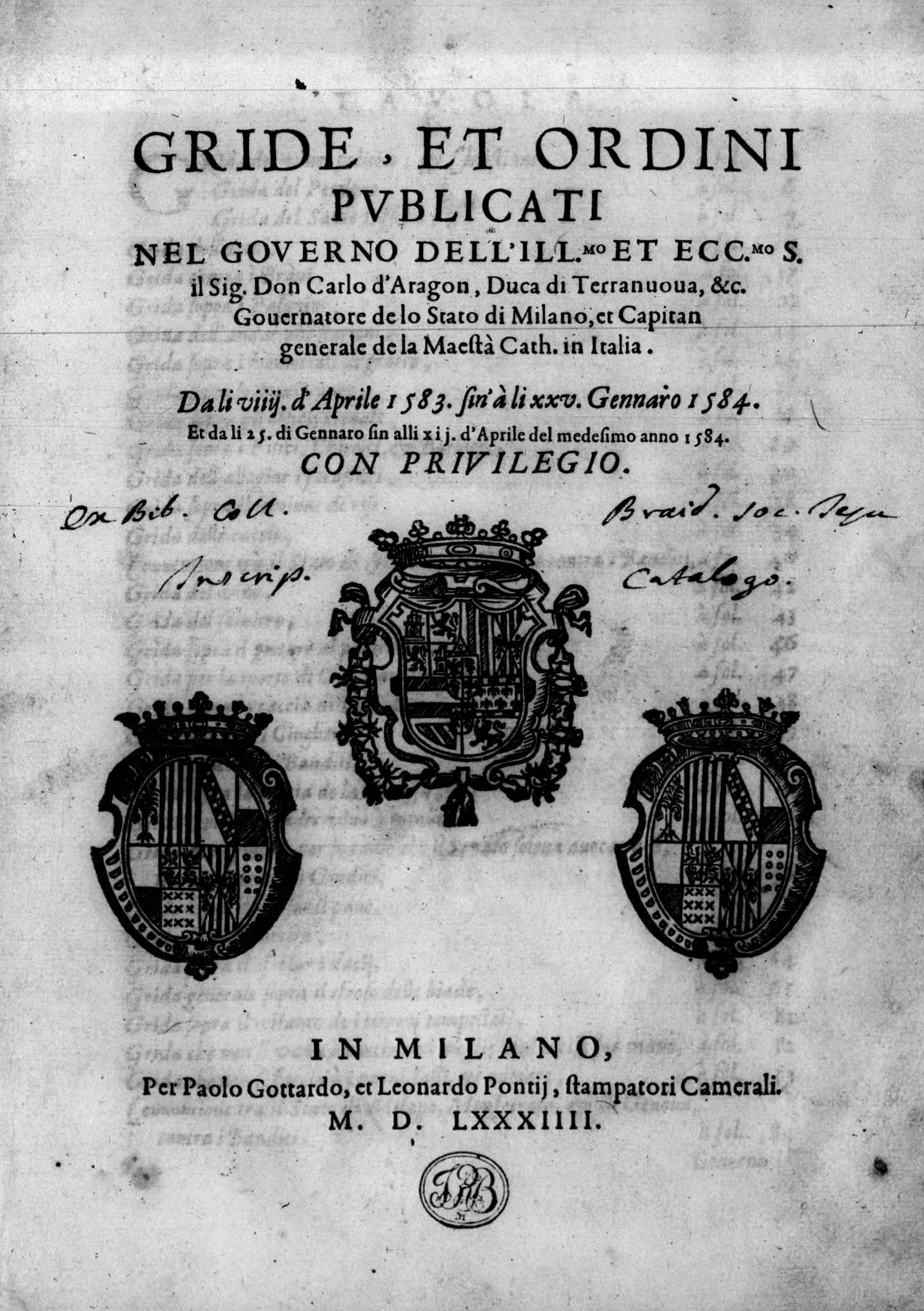
Gride, et ordini pubblicati nel Governo dell'illustrissimo et eccellentissimo signor Don Carlo d'Aragon, a collection of decrees by Carlo d'Aragona Tagliavia published in Milan in 1584

He became Duke of Terranova (Duca di Terranova) (in the Italian, not Spanish line) on 17 August 1561. On 24 April 1564, the County of Castelvetrano was raised to the Principality of Castelvetrano and Carlo became its 1st reigning prince.

Tagliavia twice served as the Viceroy of Sicily; from 1556 to 1568 and, again, from 1571 to 1577. He later served as Viceroy of Catalonia from 1581 to 1582 and as the governor of the Duchy of Milan from 1583 to 1592.

He was a Knight of the Order of Aviz and was made Knight in the Order of the Golden Fleece in 1585.

== Personal life ==
He married Margherita Ventimiglia, the daughter of Simone Ventimiglia, 5th Marquess of Geraci, and Elisabetta Moncada. Together, they were the parents of:

- Giovanni Tagliavia d'Aragona, Marquess of Avola (c. 1549–1599); he married Maria de Marini, Baroness of Gibillini.
- Simeone Tagliavia d'Aragona (1550–1604), who became a Cardinal.
- Isabella Tagliavia d’Aragona (c. 1555–1580), who married Ercole Branciforte, 1st Duke of San Giovanni.
- Giulia Tagliavia d'Aragona (d. 1621), who married Fabrizio Carafa, 1st Prince of Roccella.
- Anna Tagliavia d'Aragona (d. 1581), who married Giovanni Ventimiglia, 8th Marquess of Geraci, 1st Prince of Castelbuono.
- Ottavio d'Aragona (1565–1623), a naval commander who served under Viceroy of Naples and Sicily Pedro Téllez-Girón, Duke of Osuna for the Hispanic Monarchy.

Carlo died in Madrid on 25 September 1599. He was succeeded as 2nd Duke of Terranova and 2nd Prince of Castelvetrano, by his grandson Carlos Tagliavia d'Aragona (1585–1605).

Political offices
Preceded by García Álvarez de Toledo	Viceroy of Sicily; 1566–1568	Succeeded by Francesco Ferdinando d'Ávalos
Preceded by Giuseppe Francesco Landriano	Viceroy of Sicily; 1571–1577	Succeeded by Marcantonio Colonna
Preceded by Francisco de Moncada y Cardona	Viceroy of Catalonia; 1581–1582	Succeeded by Juan de Zúñiga y Avellaneda
Preceded by Sancho de Guevara y Padilla	Governor of the Duchy of Milan; 1583–1592	Succeeded by Juan Fernández de Velasco, 5th Duke of Frías
