= Filippo Carafa della Serra =

Cardinal Filippo Carafa della Serra
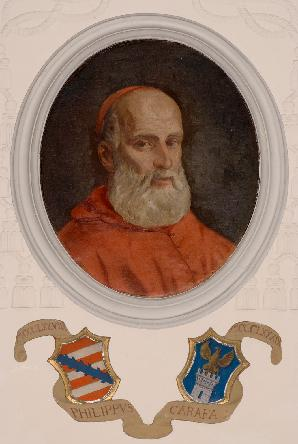
- Representation of the cardinal.

Personal life
- Born: c. 1340 Naples
- Died: 22 May 1389 (aged 48–49) Bologna
- Cause of death: Plague
- Resting place: Bologna Cathedral
- Home town: Naples
- Education: University of Bologna

Religious life
- Religion: Catholic Church
- Lineage: Carafa family
- Ordination: 18 September 1378

Senior posting
- Post: Ss. Silvestro e Martino ai Monti

Filippo Carafa della Serra (died 22 May 1389) was an Italian Cardinal of the Roman Catholic Church.

He was made a Cardinal on 18 September 1378 by Pope Urban VI. He was then archdeacon of Bologna.

Filippo Carafa della Serra was a member of a family which worked for the Catholic Church in many roles over centuries. Other cardinals in the same family are Oliviero Carafa (created 1467), Carlo Carafa (1555); Diomede Carafa (1555), Alfonso Carafa (1557), Antonio Carafa (1568), Decio Carafa (1611), Pier Luigi Carafa (1645), Carlo Carafa della Spina (1664), Fortunato Ilario Carafa della Spina (1686), Pierluigi Carafa (1728), Francesco Carafa di Trajetto (1773), Marino Carafa di Belvedere (1801), and Domenico Carafa della Spina di Traetto (1844).
