= Duke of Terranova (Italian) =

Title in Italian nobility

The Duke of Terranova (Duca di Terranova) was a title in the Italian nobility created in 1561.

== History ==
Carlo d'Aragona Tagliavia became the Duke of Terranova (in the Italian, not Spanish line) on 17 August 1561. On 24 April 1564, the County of Castelvetrano was raised to the Principality of Castelvetrano and Carlo became its 1st reigning prince while the dukedom became a subsidiary title to the prince.

== List of dukes ==
- 1561–1599: Carlo d'Aragona Tagliavia (1530–1599)

Elevated to the Prince of Castelvetrano in 1564; passed into the Pignatelli family in 1692

== See also ==
- House of Pignatelli
- List of dukes in the nobility of Italy
