= Venetico =

- Comune
- Comune di Venetico
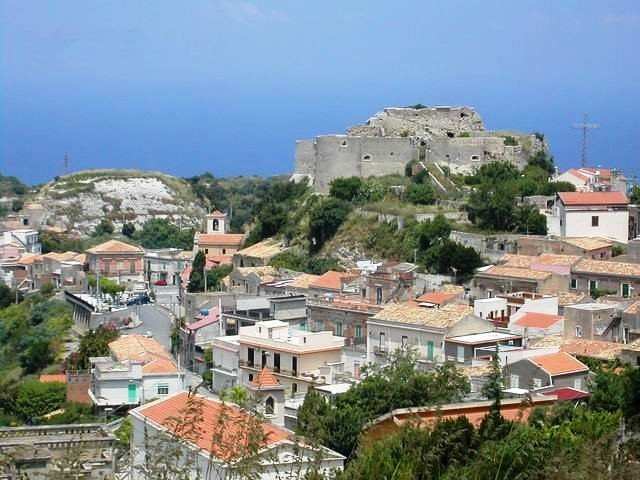

- Location within Italy Location within Sicily
- Coordinates: 38°12′N 15°23′E
- Country: Italy
- Region: Sicily
- Metropolitan city: Messina (ME)
- Frazioni: Venetico Superiore

Government
  - Mayor: Francesco Rizzo

Area
  - Total: 4.4 km^{2} (1.7 sq mi)
- Elevation: 6 m (20 ft)

Population (30 November 2012)
  - Total: 3,908
  - Density: 890/km^{2} (2,300/sq mi)
- Demonym: Venetichesi
- Time zone: UTC+1 (CET)
  - Summer (DST): UTC+2 (CEST)
- Postal code: 98040
- Dialing code: 090
- Website: Official website

Venetico (Sicilian: Venèticu) is a comune (municipality) in the Metropolitan City of Messina in the Italian region Sicily, located about 180 kilometres (110 mi) east of Palermo and about 15 kilometres (9 mi) west of Messina.

Venetico borders the following municipalities: Roccavaldina, Spadafora, Valdina.
