= Niccolò Branciforte, 1st Prince of Leonforte =

Niccolò Placido Branciforte
- 1st Prince of Leonforte; 1st Duke of Santa Lucia; 5th Count of Raccuja
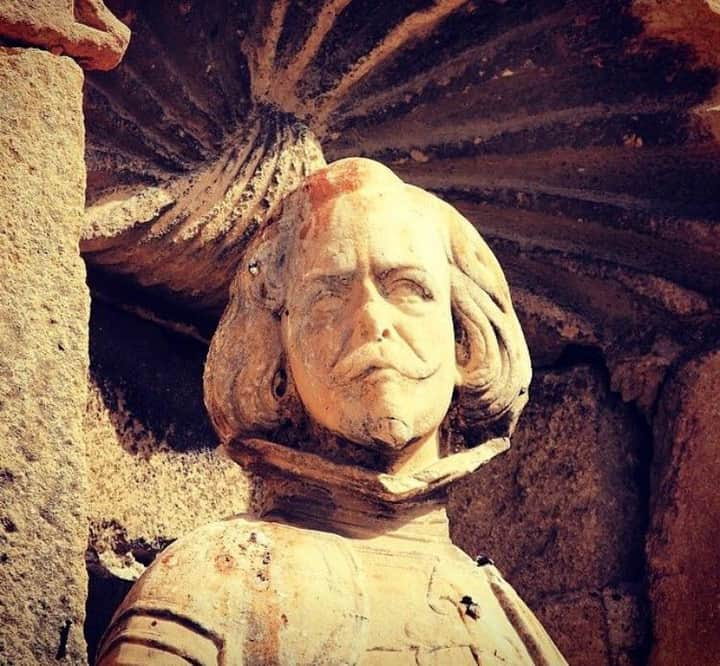
- Half-length portrait of Branciforte in a niche in the center of the Princely Stables in Leonforte

1st Prince of Leonforte
- Reign: 1622–1661
- Predecessor: Inaugural holder
- Successor: Giuseppe Branciforte

5th Count of Raccuja
- Reign: 1596–1661
- Predecessor: Giuseppe Branciforte Moncanda
- Successor: Giuseppe Branciforte
- Born: c. 1593
- Died: 16 September 1661 (aged 67–68); Leonforte, Kingdom of Sicily
- Spouse: Caterina Branciforte Barresi (m. 1611; died 1634) Francesca D'Urso (died 1661)
- Issue: Giuseppe Branciforte; Agata Branciforte; Maria Branciforte; Francesco Branciforte
- House: Branciforte
- Father: Giuseppe Branciforte Moncanda
- Mother: Agata Lanza Gioeni

Don Niccolò Placido Branciforte, 1st Prince of Leonforte (c. 1593 – 16 September 1661), was an Italian nobleman and politician of the 16th and 17th centuries.

== Early life ==
He was born around 1593 into the noble Branciforte family. He was the son of Giuseppe Branciforte Moncanda, 5th Count of Raccuja (1560–1596), and his second wife, the noblewoman Agata Lanza Gioeni (b. 1568). From his parents' marriage, he had a sister, Giovanna Flavia Branciforte. (Note: His sister, Giovanna Flavia Branciforte, married Giovanni Branciforte, Lord of Santa Maria di Niscemi (a son of Fabrizio Branciforte, 3rd Prince of Butera). After his death in 1622, she married Francesco Ventimiglia d'Aragona, 10th Marquess of Geraci (a son of Giuseppe Ventimiglia, 9th Marquess of Geraci).) From his father's first marriage to Beatrice Barrese (a daughter of Carlo Barrese, 1st Marquess of Militello), he had an elder half-sister, Melchiora Branciforte. After his father's death, in 1599 his mother married Ercole Branciforte, 1st Duke of San Giovanni, who belonged to a collateral branch of his family. From that marriage, he had several younger half-siblings, including Antonio Branciforte, 1st Prince of Scordia, Bishop Ottavio Branciforte, and Bishop Luigi Branciforte.

His paternal grandparents were Niccolò Branciforte, 1st Count of Raccuja, and Giovanna Lanza (sister of Laura Lanza, both daughters of Cesare Lanza, 1st Count of Mussomeli). His maternal grandparents were Ottavio Lanza, 1st Prince of Trabia, 2nd Count of Mussomeli, and Giovanna Orteca Gioeni, Baroness of Valcorrente and Pietratagliata.

His father died in 1596 and he succeeded him in the title of Count of Raccuja, and was entrusted to the guardianship of his mother together with his aunt, Beatrice Branciforte, and her husband Federico Spadafora, Baron of Venetico. After his mother married the Duke of San Giovanni in 1599, young Niccolò grew up in his stepfather's villa in San Michele, near Cammarata, the seat of an important aristocratic court.

== Career ==
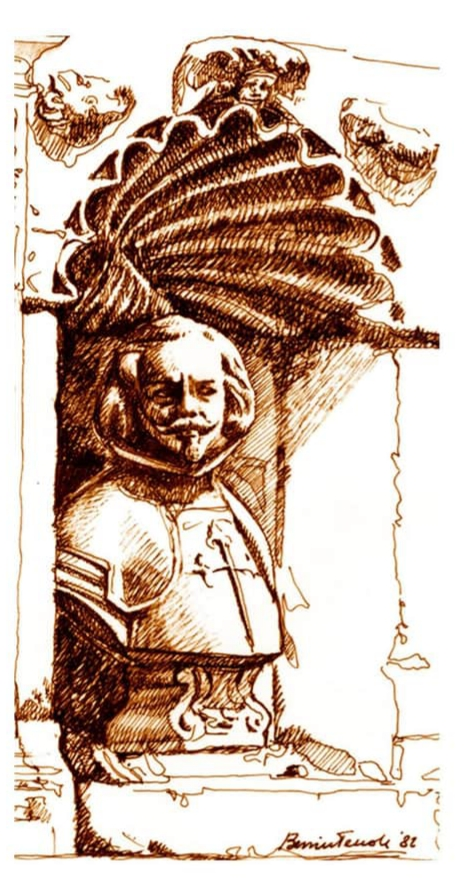
Drawing of the half-length of Prince Nicolò Placido Branciforte

In 1613, Branciforte had his first political office as Praetor of Palermo, which he also held from 1624 to 1625. Heir to the Barony of Tavi, in the Val di Noto, with a privilege given by King Philip III of Spain on 1 February 1613, enforced on 21 April 1614, he was granted permission to populate the fiefdom to found the hamlet of Leonforte. On the new fiefdom, with a privilege given by King Philip IV of Spain on 23 July 1622, enforced on 10 October of the same year, he was granted the title of 1st Prince of Leonforte.

Branciforte was Governor of the noble Company of Peace of Palermo (Compagnia della Pace di Palermo) in the years 1615 and 1621, deputy of the Kingdom of Sicily in 1621, Vicar General in Val di Noto in 1627 and 1654, for the defense of the Sicilian coasts against the Turks, and in 1630 he bought the city of Carlentini from the Royal Court for 31,062 scudi, of which he assumed the lordship. From 1642 to 1645, the Prince of Leonforte held the office of Stratigoto of Messina. Giovanni Andrea Massa, Count of San Giovanni la Punta, gave the hamlet of Santa Lucia, near Catania, to Branciforte on which, with a privilege given on 4 July 1651 by King Philip IV of Spain, executed on 6 November of the same year, he was invested with the title of 1st Duke of Santa Lucia.

== Personal life ==
On 25 November 1611, he married his cousin, the noblewoman Caterina Branciforte Barresi (1591–1634), a daughter of Fabrizio Branciforte, 3rd Prince of Butera. Before her death in 1634, they were the parents of seven children:

- Giuseppe Branciforte, 2nd Prince of Leonforte (1614–1698), who married his cousin Caterina Branciforte, a daughter of Giovanni Branciforte, Lord of Santa Maria di Niscemi, and Giovanna Flavia Branciforte. (Note: Giovanni Branciforte, Lord of Santa Maria di Niscemi (1572–1622), was a son of Fabrizio Branciforte, 3rd Prince of Butera, and younger brother of Francesco Branciforte, 4th Prince of Butera.)
- Agata Branciforte (1613–c. 1662), who married her cousin, Giuseppe Branciforte, 1st Prince of Niscemi, a son of Giovanni Branciforte, Lord of Santa Maria di Niscemi, and Giovanna Flavia Branciforte, in 1628.
- Maria Branciforte (c. 1620–1660), who married Giovanni del Carretto, 4th Count of Racalmuto, a son of Girolamo del Carretto, 3rd Count of Racalmuto and Princess Beatrice Ventimiglia (a daughter of the 1st Prince of Castelbuono). Giovanni was executed in February 1650.
- Francesco Branciforte, 2nd Duke of Santa Lucia (c. 1625–1684), who married Anna Gaetano. After her death he married his niece, Caterina del Carretto Branciforte, a daughter of Giovanni del Carretto, 4th Count of Racalmuto, and his sister, Maria Branciforte.
- Caterina Branciforte, a nun in the monastery of the Chiesa di San Francesco delle Stimmate in Palermo with the name of Sister Placida Caterina.
- Placida Branciforte, a nun in the monastery of the Chiesa di San Francesco delle Stimmate in Palermo with the name of Sister Agata Rosalia.
- Margherita Branciforte, a nun in the monastery of the Chiesa di San Francesco delle Stimmate in Palermo with the name of Sister Caterina Giuseppa.

After the death of his first wife, he married Donna Francesca D'Urso. Together, they were the parents of a daughter:

- Caterina Anna Branciforte (b. 1637), who later married Don Antonio Raccuja, a nobleman from Partinico, creating a collateral branch of the family.

In 1651 his father transferred the Duchy of Santa Lucia and the Barony of Cassibile to his second son, Francesco. Branciforte died on 16 September 1661 in Leonforte. He was succeeded as the Prince of Leonforte by his eldest son, Giuseppe. He was also invested with the Principality of Pietraperzia, left vacant upon the death of his cousin Margherita d'Austria Branciforte (daughter of Francesco Branciforte, 4th Prince of Butera and Joanna of Austria).

=== Descendants ===
Through his son Francesco, he was a grandfather of Niccolò Branciforte, 6th Prince of Butera (1651–1723), who succeeded to his uncle's Principality of Leonforte, the Principality of Pietraperzia, and the County of Raccuja, in 1698.
