= Branciforte family =

Sicilian aristocratic family

Branciforte Italian: Casa di Branciforte
- Italian noble family
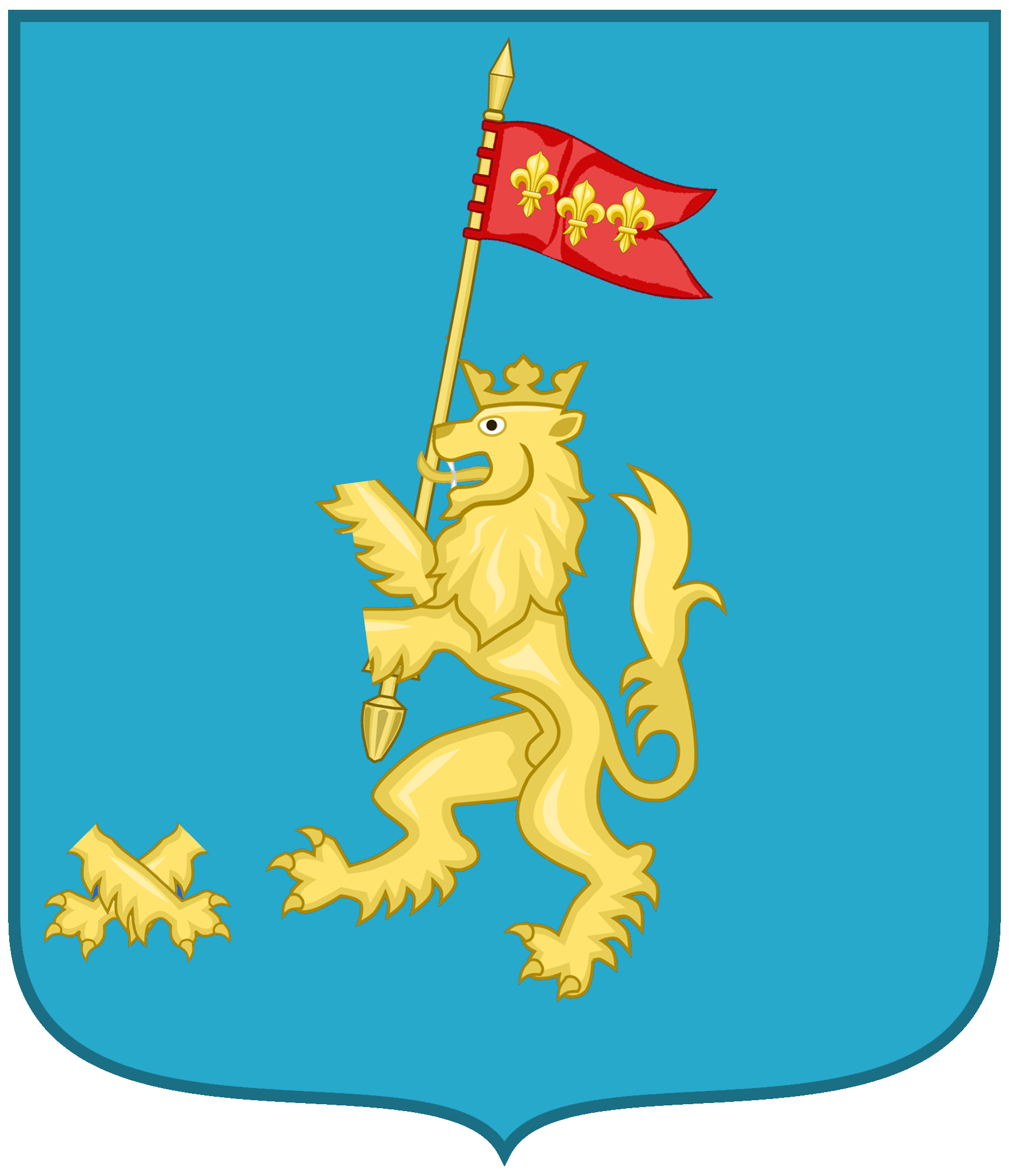
- Country: Italy Former countries: Kingdom of Sicily; Two Sicilies; Kingdom of Italy
- Founded: 9th century
- Founder: Obizzo Branciforte
- Final head: Stefania Branciforte, 12th Princess of Butera
- Titles: Prince of Butera; Prince of Leonforte; Prince of Pietraperzia; Prince of Scordia; Duke of Saint Lucia; Marquess of Barrafranca; Marquess of Militello; Count of Mazarin; Count of Raccuja; Baron of Grassuliato; Baron of Belmonte; Baron of the Biviere of Lentini

The Branciforte family (sometimes Branciforti) is an old and influential Sicilian aristocratic family of Italian nobles, clergy, and men of arts, from the 9th century. Tradition has it the family began with Obizzo Branciforte, a knight who fought under Charlemagne.

== History ==
The first to settle permanently from Piacenza on Sicilian soil was Guglielmo Branciforti under King Frederick I, but already at that time the family was considered important in Sicily. He was in fact preceded by some years by Aloisia Branciforte, who married Orlando I Grifeo Maniace, 5th Baron of Partanna and Strategote of Messina in 1275. Guglielmo died during a duel in Catania in 1347; he left the Piacenza possessions to his brothers Bosso and Gaspare, while the lands in Sicily went to his nephews Raffaello and Ottaviano, sons of a third brother, Stefano, who was in charge of collecting duties and controlling the traffic of goods in the Port of Licata, as well as rational master of the Kingdom.

Giovanni, son of Raffaele, a man of arms, under Frederick III the Simple "reduced to royal obedience", the city of Piazza and thus received it as a gift from the same sovereign, also obtaining the title of Baron. From King Martin I he also received the fortress and the fiefdom of Grassuliato, in addition to the fiefdoms of Condrò and Gatto.

In the 17th century, Niccolò Branciforte, 1st Prince of Leonforte (1593–1661) married his relative Caterina Branciforti (1600–1634), daughter of Fabrizio Branciforte, 3rd Prince of Butera, with whom he had seven children: Giuseppe, Agata, Maria, Francesco, Caterina, Placida and Margherita. The latter were destined for religious life and entered the monastery of the Chiesa di San Francesco delle Stimmate in Palermo with the names of Sister Placida Caterina, Sister Agata Rosalia, Sister Caterina Giuseppa. The prince then married, as a second wife, Donna Francesca D'Urso with whom he had Caterina Anna in 1637 in Leonforte, who was then married to Don Antonio Raccuja, a nobleman from Partinico, generating a collateral branch of the family.

Starting from Fabrizio Branciforte, 3rd Prince of Butera, many members of the family have held important positions in the Kingdom of Sicily. Among them are Giuseppe Branciforti, the vicar general of the Kingdom for the grain supply in 1671, Supreme Prefect of the Sicilian Cavalry, decorated with the Order of the Golden Fleece and the Supreme Order of the Most Holy Annunciation, the highest honor of the House of Savoy.

In 1805, Stefania Branciforte, 12th Princess of Butera (1788–1843), daughter of Niccolò Placido Branciforte (1761–1806) and Caterina Branciforte (1768–1789), sole heir of the Branciforte estate and titles, married Giuseppe Lanza, 8th Prince of Trabia (1780–1855), an archaeologist and Director of Fine Arts in Sicily, bringing as a dowry all the titles and fiefs of the Branciforte family. Their descendants took the surname Lanza-Branciforte.

== Notable members ==
=== Princes of Butera (1563) ===
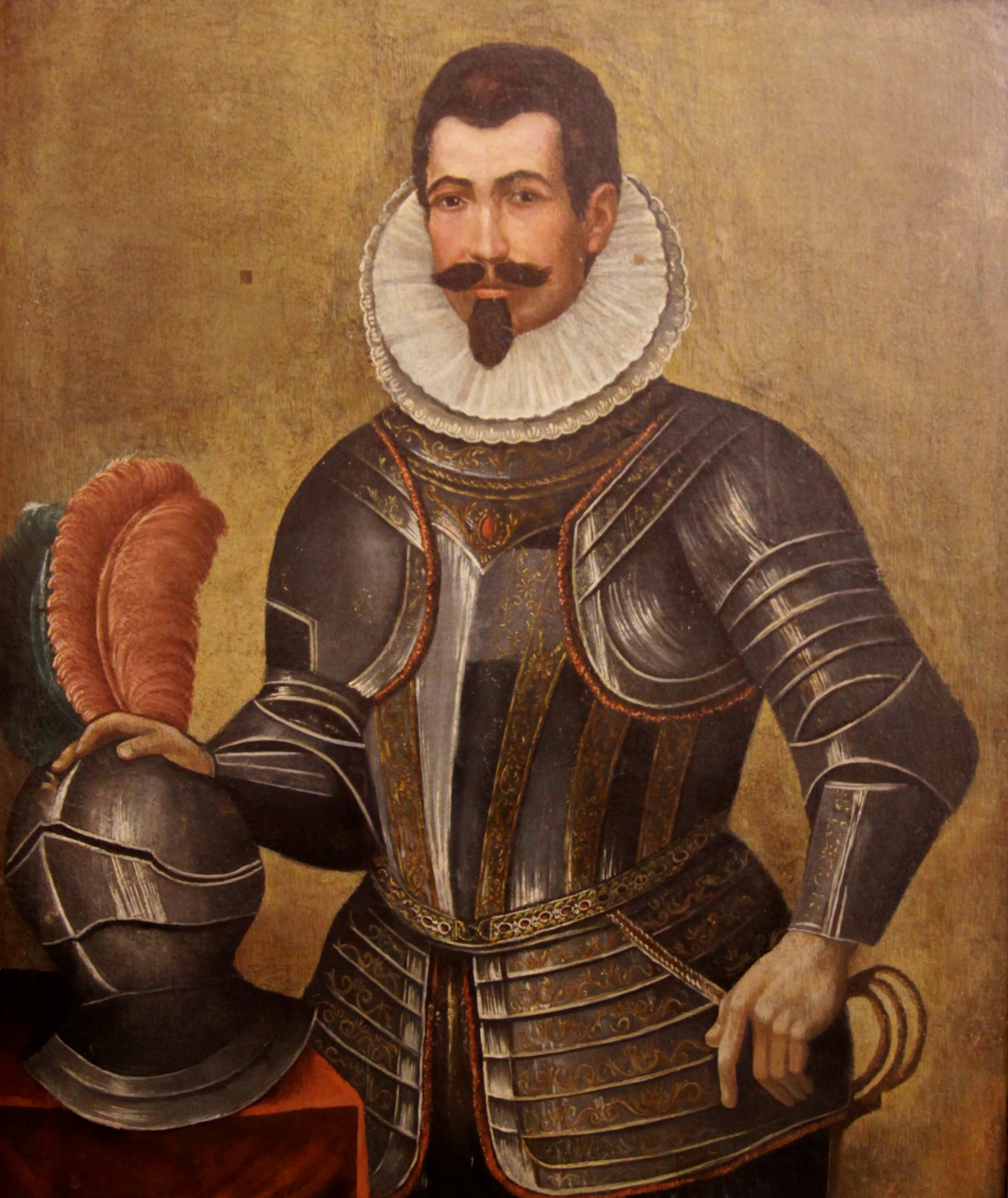
Francesco Branciforte, 4th Prince of Butera

- 1563–1564: Ambrogio Santapau Branciforte, 1st Prince (1518–1564) (Note: Ambrogio Santapau was the eldest son of Ponzio Santapau, 4th Marquess of Licodia, and Isabella Branciforte (daughter of Niccolò Branciforte, 1st Count of Mazzarino, and Belladama d'Alagona e Gaetani, Baroness of Tavi e di Baulì).)
- 1564–1590: Francesco Santapau Branciforte, 2nd Prince (1538–1590), brother of the preceding.
- 1590–1620: Fabrizio Branciforte, 3rd Prince (1551–1624), grand-nephew of the preceding and son of the 4th Count of Mazzarino; also Prince of Pietraperzia and Marquess of Militello.
- 1620–1622: Francesco Branciforte, 4th Prince (1575–1622), son of the preceding; married Joanna of Austria. (Note: Joanna of Austria (1573–1630) was the illegitimate daughter of John of Austria, the illegitimate son of Charles V, Holy Roman Emperor.)
- 1622–1659: Margarita Branciforte, 5th Princess (1605–1659), daughter of the preceding.
- 1659–1723: Niccolò Branciforte, 6th Prince (1670–1723), great-grandson of the 3rd Prince; son of Francesco Branciforte, 2nd Duke of Santa Lucia. (Note: Niccolò Branciforte, 6th Prince of Butera (1670–1723), was the great-grandson of Fabrizio Branciforte, 3rd Prince of Butera, through the 3rd Prince's daughter, Caterina Branciforte, Countess of Raccuja (1594–1634). Caterina married Niccolò Branciforte, 1st Prince of Leonforte (1593–1661) and was the mother of the 6th Prince's father, Francesco Branciforte, 2nd Duke of Santa Lucia (1640–1684).)
- 1723–1763: Caterina Branciforte, 7th Princess (1691–1763), daughter of the preceding; married Ercole Branciforte, Duke of Branciforte.
- 1763–1764: Ercole Branciforte, 8th Prince (1697–1764), husband of preceding, son of Girolamo Branciforte, Duke of San Nicolò (1660–1716). (Note: Ercole Branciforte, 8th Prince of Butera (1697–1764) was the son of Girolamo Branciforte, Duke of San Niccolò and Marquess of Martini (1660–1716). Girolamo was the son of Pietro Branciforte, Marquess of Martini (1615–1661), a brother of Antonio Branciforte, 1st Prince of Scordia and half-brother of Niccolò Branciforte, 1st Prince of Leonforte.)
- 1764–1799: Salvatore Branciforte, 9th Prince (1730–1799), son of preceding; married his maternal aunt, Maria Rosalia Branciforte (1717–1749).
- 1799–1814: Ercole Branciforte, 10th Prince (1750–1814), son of preceding.
- 1814–1831: Maria Caterina Branciforte, 11th Princess (1768–1831), daughter of preceding; married Niccolò Branciforte, 6th Prince of Scordia.
- 1831–1843: Stefania Branciforte, 7th Princess of Butera (1788–1843), daughter of the preceding; married Giuseppe Lanza, 8th Prince of Trabia.

End of the Branciforte family and beginning of the Lanza-Branciforte

=== Princes of Leonforte (1622) ===
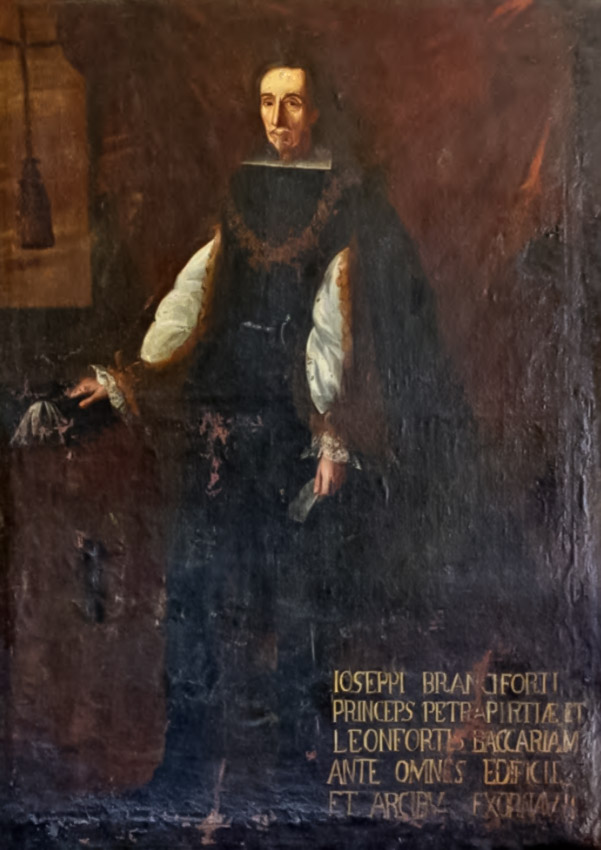
Portrait of the 2nd Prince of Leonforte, unknown artist

- 1622–1661: Niccolò Branciforte, 1st Prince (1593–1661), son of Giuseppe Branciforte, 5th Count of Raccuja.
- 1661–1698: Giuseppe Branciforte, 2nd Prince
- 1698–1728: Niccolò Branciforti, 3rd Prince
- 1728–1780: Ercole Branciforte Naselli, 4th Prince
- 1780–1806: Giuseppe Branciforte, 5th Prince
- 1806–1807: Niccolò Placido Branciforte, 6th Prince
- 1807–1808: Emanuele Branciforte Valguarnera, 7th Prince
- 1809–1843: Giuseppe Branciforte Natale, 8th Prince
- 1843–1855: Pietro Emanuele Lanza Branciforte, 9th Prince
- 1855–1868: Giuseppe Lanza Branciforte Spinelli, 10th Prince
- 1868–1929: Pietro Lanza Branciforte Galeotti, 11th Prince
- 1929–1938: Ottavio Lanza Branciforte Galeotti, 12th Prince
- 1938–1946: Francesco Giuseppe Lanza Branciforte Fardella, 13th Prince

=== Princes of Scordia (1628) ===
- 1628–1658: Antonio Branciforte, 1st Prince of Scordia (c. 1590–1658), son of Ercole Branciforte, 1st Duke of San Giovanni.
- 1658–1688: Ercole Branciforte, 2nd Prince of Scordia (c. 1641–1688), son of the preceding.
- 1688–1720: Giuseppe Branciforte, 3rd Prince of Scordia (c. 1670–1720), son of the preceding.
- 1720–1780: Ercole Branciforte, 4th Prince of Scordia (c. 1710–1780), son of the preceding.
- 1780–c. 1790: Giuseppe Branciforte, 5th Prince of Scordia (b. c. 1725), son of the preceding.
- c. 1790–1806: Niccolò Branciforte, 6th Prince of Scordia (1761–1806), son of the preceding; married Maria Caterina Branciforte, 11th Princess of Butera, Pietraperzia, and Leonforte
- 1806–1843: Stefania Branciforte, 7th Princess of Butera (1788–1843), daughter of the preceding; married Giuseppe Lanza, 8th Prince of Trabia.

End of the Branciforte family and beginning of the Lanza-Branciforte

=== Dukes of San Giovanni (1587) ===
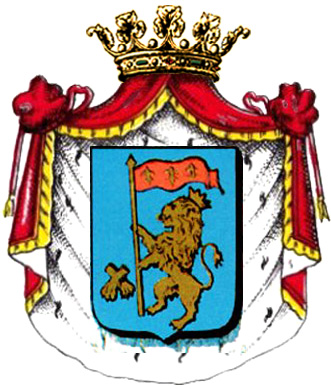
Branciforte coat of arms

- 1587–1616: Ercole Branciforte Settimo, 1st Duke (1550–1616), Ambassador to Emperor Rudolf
- 1616–1622: Girolamo Branciforte Tagliava, 2nd Duke (d. 1622), son of the preceding.
- 1622–1652: Francesco Branciforte Gioeni, 3rd Duke (c. 1600–1652), son of the preceding.
- 1652–1657: Girolamo Branciforte Gioeni, 4th Duke (c. 1635–1657)
- 1657–1680: Giovanna Branciforte Moncada, 5th Duchess (1645–1680), who married Ferdinando de Moncada d'Aragona. (Note: Gaetana Maria Branciforte, 4th Duchess of San Giovanni (1645–1680), who married Ferdinando de Moncada d'Aragona, 1st Duke of San Giovanni were the parents of Luigi Moncada, 7th Prince of Paternò (1670–1743).)
- 1667–1680: Ferdinando Moncada Gaetani; Jure uxoris
- 1680–1743: Luigi Guglielmo Moncada Branciforte, 6th Duke
- 1747–1764: Francesco Rodrigo Moncada, 7th Duke
- 1764–1827: Giovanni Luigi Moncada Ruffo, 8th Duke
- 1827–1861: Pietro Moncada Beccadelli di Bologna, 9th Duke
- 1861–1895: Corrado Moncada Bajada, 10th Duke
- 1895–1920: Pietro Moncada Starrabba, 11th Duke
- 1920–1946: Ugo Moncada Valguarnera, 12th Duke

=== Counts of Mazzarino (1507) ===
- Niccolò Branciforte, 1st Count, son of the 7th Baron of Mazzarino; Strategote of Messina, purchased the Lordship of Melilli from the Moncada family, and was created 1st Count of Mazarin in 1507 by King Ferdinand II of Aragon.
- Giovanni Branciforte, 2nd Count (b. 1493)
- Artale Branciforte, 3rd Count (b. 1515)
- Giovanni Branciforte, 4th Count (1538–1556), married Dorotea Barresi, Princess of Pietraperzia (daughter of Girolamo Pietraperzia Barresi).

Title merged with the Princes of Butera

=== Barons of Mazzarino ===
- Stefano Branciforte, 1st Baron
- Raffaelo Branciforte, 2nd Baron (b. 1310)
- Federico Branciforte, 3rd Baron (d. 1376)
- Niccolò Branciforte, 4th Baron (b. 1360)
- Federico Branciforte, 5th Baron (1380–1428)
- Niccolò Branciforte, 6th Baron (1400–1453)
- Giovanni Branciforte, 7th Baron (1430–1506)

Elevated to Counts of Mazzarino

== See also ==
- Palazzo Branciforte, Palermo
- Ottavio Branciforte
- Antonio Branciforte Colonna
- Castello Barresi Branciforte
