= Fabrizio Branciforte, 3rd Prince of Butera =

Sicilian aristocrat (1551–1624)

Fabrizio Branciforte, 3rd Prince of Butera (1551 – January 1624), also 5th Count of Mazarin, was an Italian aristocrat. He was knighted into the Order of the Golden Fleece in 1607.

== Early life ==
Branciforte was born in 1551 into the Sicilian noble Branciforte family. He was the son of Giovanni Branciforte, 4th Count of Mazarin (1538–1556), (Note: The title, Count of Mazarin is sometimes referred to as Count of Mazzarino.) and Dorotea Barresi Santapau, Princess of Pietraperzia (1532–1590). After his father's death in 1556, his mother married Vincenzo Barresi, 2nd Marquess of Militello. After Barresi's death in 1567, she married Juan de Zúñiga y Requesens, the Viceroy of Naples from 1579 to 1582.

His paternal grandparents were Artale Branciforte, 3rd Count of Mazarin, and Chiara Tagliavia. His maternal grandparents were Girolamo Barresi, 2nd Marquess of Pietraperzia, and Antonia Santapau (sister of Ambrogio Santapau, 1st Prince of Butera). (Note: His grandmother, Antonia Santapau, and granduncles, Ambrogio Santapau and Francesco Santapau, were the children of Ponzio Santapau, 4th Marquess of Licodia, and Isabella Branciforte (daughter of Niccolò Branciforte, 1st Count of Mazarin, and Belladama d'Alagona Gaetani, Baroness of Tavi and Baulì).) Upon the 1571 death without children or descendants of maternal uncle, Pietro Barresi, 1st Prince of Pietraperzia, the Principality of Pietraperzia and the fief of Alfano, were invested to his mother in 1573.

In April 1566, upon the death of his father, he was awarded his fiefdoms under regency; for which he was reinvested formally on 16 November 1557.

== Career ==
Through his 1571 marriage, the Branciforte thus acquired the possession of the Marquessate of Militello. In 1580, his maternal great-uncle, Francesco Santapau, 2nd Prince of Butera (brother of Ambrogio Santapau, 1st Prince of Butera), who had no children, designated Fabrizio as heir of the Principality of Butera and of the fief of Occhiolà, of which he was invested on 8 December 1591, as well as of the Principality of Pietraperzia, inherited from his mother who died in that same year.

He was a poor feudal administrator, and his massive estate lost money. He had contracted substantial debts with the Qàbala of Palermo since his youth. The administration of the family assets passed to the eldest son Francesco Branciforte Barresi, with whom he had numerous quarrels and who had him banned from Palermo until 1621.

As Prince of Butera, he was a Deputy of the Kingdom of Sicily in the years 1594, 1603, 1606, 1609, 1615 and 1618. On 30 September 1612, he was conferred by King Philip III of Spain the dignity of Grandee of Spain of the First Class, confirmed in 1625.

== Personal life ==
In 1571, he married Caterina Barresi Branciforte (d. 1604), a daughter of Carlo Barrese, 1st Marquess of Militello, and Belladama Branciforte (a daughter of Blasco Branciforte, Baron of Tavi). Caterina was the sister of Vincenzo Barresi, 2nd Marquis of Militello, who married Fabrizio's mother after his father's death. Together, they had nine children, including:

- Francesco Branciforte, 4th Prince of Butera (1575–1622), who married Joanna of Austria, the illegitimate daughter of John of Austria, himself the illegitimate son of Charles V, Holy Roman Emperor.
- Giovanni Branciforte (d. 1622), the Lord of Santa Maria di Niscemi; he married Giovanna Flavia Branciforte, a daughter of Giuseppe Branciforte, 5th Count of Raccuja, and Agata Lanza Gioeni.
- Dorotea Branciforte (d. 1629), who married Giovanni Ventimiglia, 1st Prince of Castelbuono and 8th Marquess of Geraci, a son of Simone Ventimiglia, 7th Marquess of Geraci, and Maria Antonia Ventimiglia Alliata.
- Caterina Branciforte (1594–1634), who married Niccolò Branciforte, 1st Prince of Leonforte, a son of Giuseppe Branciforte, 5th Count of Raccuja, and Agata Lanza Gioeni, in 1611.

His wife died in October 1604 in Monreale. He died in Palermo in January 1624.
