= Giuseppe Branciforte, 2nd Prince of Leonforte =

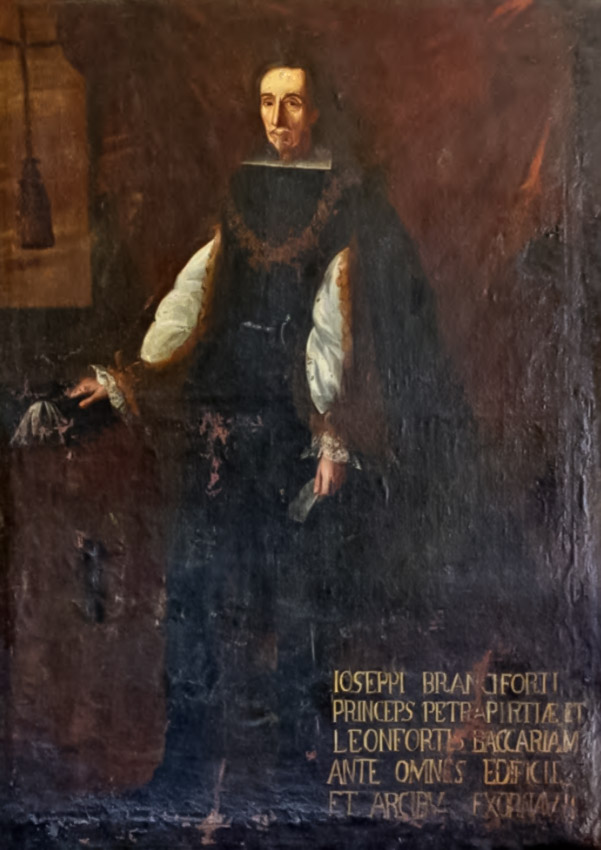
Portrait of the 2nd Prince of Leonforte, 17th century, oil on canvas, unknown artist

Don Giuseppe Branciforte, 2nd Prince of Leonforte (1614 – June 1698) was an Italian prince.

== Early life ==
Branciforte was born in Leonforte in 1614. He was the eldest son of Niccolò Branciforte, 1st Prince of Leonforte, and Caterina Branciforte Barresi (1591–1634), who were first cousins. His younger brother was Francesco Branciforte, 2nd Duke of Santa Lucia.

His paternal grandparents were Giuseppe Branciforte Moncanda, 5th Count of Raccuja, and his second wife, Agata Lanza Gioeni. His maternal grandparents were Fabrizio Branciforte, 3rd Prince of Butera. Among his extended family were uncles, Francesco Branciforte, 4th Prince of Butera, and Giovanni Branciforte, Lord of Santa Maria di Niscemi.

== Career ==
He was Praetor of Palermo from 1656 to 1657 and Deputy of the Kingdom of Sicily in 1664, 1668, 1671, 1680, 1684, and 1690.

A notable art collector, his poor administration of his properties and the preference given to his younger brother Francesco, who in 1651 obtained as a wedding gift the fief of Cassibile previously assigned to him in 1630, made his life difficult; nevertheless, upon his father's death in 1661 he succeeded him as Prince of Leonforte. He was also invested with the Principality of Pietraperzia, left vacant upon the death of his cousin Margherita of Austria Branciforti.

== Personal life ==
Branciforte married his first cousin, Caterina Branciforte, a daughter of Giovanni Branciforte, Lord of Santa Maria di Niscemi, and Giovanna Flavia Branciforte. Together, they were the parents of Melchiorre Branciforte, and Baldassare Branciforte, who both died young.

Branciforte died in Leonforte in June 1698. Upon his death, with no surviving male issue, he was succeeded by his nephew, Niccolò Branciforte (1651–1723).
