= Girolamo Pietraperzia Barresi =

Sicilian nobleman (c. 1502–1549)

Girolamo Pietraperzia Barresi, 2nd Marquess of Pietraperzia (c. 1502 – 15 March 1549) was a Sicilian nobleman who was executed after a prolonged process for the crime of murder and parricide.

== Early life ==
He was a son of Matteo Barresi, 1st Marquess of Pietraperzia (1471–1531), and Antonella Valguarnera. His paternal grandparents were Giovanni Antonio Barresi, Lord of Pietraperzia, and Laura Barrese, Lady of Molisena and Alfano. His maternal grandparents were Vitale Valguarnera, Baron of Assoro, and Eleonora Ribesaltes, Baroness of Ranciditi.

== Career ==
Girolamo was one of the patrons of the mathematician and astronomer Francesco Maurolico.

His sentence for the murder of his father, Matteo Barresi, and two servants in 1533, was based on a confession obtained under torture. His sentence was initially commuted by the Holy Roman Emperor Charles V, after extracting some hefty fines, but the new viceroy Juan de Vega ultimately enforced the death sentence in Palermo, by decapitation, on 15 March 1549.

== Personal life ==
Barresi was married to Antonia Santapau (c. 1515–1549), a daughter of Ponzio Santapau, 4th Marquess of Licodia, and Eleonora Branciforte (a daughter of Niccolò Branciforte, 1st Count of Mazarin). Antonia was the sister of Ambrogio Santapau and Francesco Santapau, both Princes of Butera. Together, they two children:

- Dorotea Barresi, Princess of Pietraperzia (1532–1590), who married three times; first to Giovanni Branciforte, 4th Count of Mazarin. After his death in 1556, she married Vincenzo Barresi, 2nd Marquess of Militello. After Barresi's death in 1567, she married the new Viceroy of Naples Juan de Zúñiga y Requesens, with whom she moved to Spain where she participated in the upbringing of King Philip V of Spain.
- Pietro Barresi, 1st Prince of Pietraperzia (1536–1571), who married Giulia Moncada, a daughter of Francesco I Moncada, Prince of Paterno, and Caterina Pignatelli Carafa.

Following Barresi's execution on 15 March 1549, he was buried in the Church of San Domenico, Palermo. Reportedly heartbroken by her husband's death, Antonia took her own life by poisoning herself on Christmas night 1549. As his son Pietro died without progeny, the estates passed to his sister, Dorotea, and her descendants.

=== Descendants ===
Through his daughter Dorotea, he was grandfather of Fabrizio Branciforte, 3rd Prince of Butera (1551–1624), who married Caterina Barresi Branciforte (a daughter of Carlo Barrese, 1st Marquess of Militello, and Belladama Branciforte. Caterina was the sister of Vincenzo Barresi, 2nd Marquis of Militello, who married Fabrizio's mother after his father's death).
