= List of stratigoti and governors of Messina =

The office of Stratigoti (also called Straticò, Stratigò, Stradigò, or Stratigoto) dates back to the Byzantine era and had a purely military character. With the birth of the County of Sicily and then of the Kingdom of Sicily, the figure of the strategoto remained at the head of Messina, who, together with his curia, had as his main task that of enforcing the laws and administering justice. Furthermore, the strategoto intervened in the election of the city officials (jurors, piazza masters, sea consuls and others). Even the transfers of real estate had to be done through his curia. The number of judges of the Curia Straticoziale, initially fluctuating between 3 and 5, was fixed at three in the 16th century. The Curia Straticoziale was competent in both civil and criminal matters: its jurisdiction included, between the 12th and 13th centuries, in addition to the territory of Messina, all the territory from Lentini to Patti, and then, after 1302, was restricted to the district from Milazzo to Taormina. The strategote remained in office for one year. After the anti-Spanish revolt of Messina from 1674 to 1678, the office of strategote was abolished and replaced with that of governor.

== List of stratigoti and governors of Messina ==
=== Stratigoti ===
==== 5th century – 11th century ====
- 400 Teodosio
- 407 Metrodoro
- 550 Domenziolo
- 7l8 Sergio Paulo
- 787 Niceta
- 1060 Catameno Ambusto
- 1061 Rotlando Landolina, normanno. Ricevette il titolo da Ruggero d'Altavilla dopo la conquista dell'isola
- 1080 Nicolò o Nicola (Cola) Camuglia
- 1082 Giovanni di Ferro
- 1082 Riccardo d'Orleans
- 1081 Ugo Ferro, normanno
- 1092 Giovanni Grifeo o Graffeo

==== 12th century ====
- 1100 Ruggiero di Norvegia
- 1108 Velardo Velardi
- 1115 Giovanni Graffeo
- 1118 Riccardo Vagliaman
- 1119 Niccolo Leontini, siciliano, Gerardo Leontini, siciliano
- 1120 Riccardo Filingeri
- 1125 Gervasio Ruffo
- 1131 Abbo Barrese, da Palermo
- 1137 Riccardo di Patti, da Messina
- 1139 Gerardo Leontini, da Messina
- 1149 Giorgio Landolina
- 1150 Corrado Saccano, da Messina
- 1154 Guglielmo Perollo
- 1160 Metrodoro da Scio
- 1161 Roberto Saccano, da Messina
- 1163 Ruggieri di Rohan, normanno
- 1168 Polidoro Pierleoni, italiano
- 1169 Giorgio Landolina, siciliano
- 1172 Roberto Trani
- 1176 Ugone Graffeo, da Palermo
- 1179 Giorgio Crisafi, da Messina
- 1185 Giovanni Leontini, di Messina
- 1189 Gualtieri Saccano, da Messina
- 1192 Leone d'Avito
- 1195 Ladislao Anzalone, da Messina
- 1199 Diopoldo von Hohenburg, tedesco

==== 13th century ====
- 1200 Giovanni Calvelli, da Palermo
- 1203 Giovanni Leontini, da Messina
- 1208 Federico Anzalone, da Catania
- 1212 Bartolomeo d'Avito
- 1215 Roberto Palici, da Messina
- 1219 Federico Anzalone, da Catania
- 1223 Alafranco Leontini, da Messina
- 1225 Vinciguerra Palici, da Messina
- 1230 Luca Crisafi, da Messina
- 1232 Rartolomeo d'Avito
- 1235 Giovanni Graffeo, da Palermo
- 1238 Corrado de Poitiers
- 1240 Gualtieri Velardi
- 1244 Niccolò Palici, da Messina
- 1245 Bonafede Collura, da Messina
- 1246 Galvano Lanza, Barone di Longi e Brolo, dei Duchi di Baviera
- 1249 Riccardetto Alemanno, siciliano
- 1252 Ruggieri Gervasio Ruffo
- 1254 Guglielmo Borello
- 1256 Leonardo Aldigieri
- 1258 Abbo Filangeri, da Messina
- 1260 Riccardo Gaetano, pisano
- 1261 Roberto Grangiano
- 1262 Guglielmo Cicala, figlio di Carlo, Viscount of Alifia
- 1265 Giordano d'Anglona. Paolo Lanza, siciliano
- 1267 Guglielmo Grosso e Porzio, da Messina
- 1268 Niccolò Spinola, genovese
- 1269 Bernardo Ferro, da Trapani
- 1270 Bartolomeo Graffeo, da Palermo
- 1271 Giovanni di S. Remigio
- 1272 Giovanni Natoli, Baron of Laconia and Sparta
- 1272 Paolo Lanza Baron ofS. Pelagia, da Palermo
- 1273 Filippo Sondard
- 1276 Corrado da Moirer
- 1278 Nicolò Cesareo, da Messina
- 1280 Narsone de Turciano
- 1281 Alaimo di Leontini, da Messina
- 1282 Bartolomeo Mariscalco, da Messina
- 1283 Corrado Lanza, siciliano, Baron of Longi
- 1284 Baldovino Mussomino
- 1288 Gerardo Saccano, da Messina
- 1289 Nicolò Palici, da Messina
- 1291 Gualtieri Velardo, siciliano
- 1292 Arrigo Chiaramonte, siciliano
- 1294 Nicolò Palizzi, da Messina
- 1295 Federico Collura, da Messina
- 1296 Francesco d'Avito
- 1297 Alfonso Bonulpen, catalano
- 1299 Pietro delle Rame, catalano

==== 14th century ====
- 1300 Raimondo degli Uberti
- 1303 Farinata degli Uberti
- 1305 Giovanni Ventimiglia
- 1306 Arrigo Barresi, da Palermo
- 1308 Manfredi Chiaramonte, da Palermo
- 1309 Asnarus Peris Sosa, spagnolo
- 1310 Giovanni Romeo, da Messina
- 1312 Lamberto Montaperto, da Palermo
- 1315 Andrea Alifia, da Palermo
- 1317 Francesco Platamone, da Vizzini
- 1320 Cristofaro Romano, siciliano
- 1322 Pietro di Mauro, da Messina
- 1324 Ruggiero la Lamia
- 1326 Alanfranco Leontini, da Messina
- 1329 Natale Anzalone, da Catania
- 1331 Arrigo Romeo, siciliano
- 1333 Pietro delle Rame
- 1334 Filippo di Mauro, gran cancelliere di Messina
- 1336 Luigi Aldobrandini
- 1338 Giacomo la Lamia
- 1339 Ugone Lanza, da Messina, Baron of Longi e Brolo
- 1340 Filippo di Mauro, gran cancelliere di Messina
- 1342 Federico Callari
- 1343 Stefano di Mauro
- 1344 Orlando d'Aragona, da Messina
- 1346 Giovanni Coriglies. Alfonso Bonculpon. Niccolò de Azalori
- 1348 Cristofaro Romano, Baron of Cesarò, da Messina
- 1350 Arrigo Rosso Count d'Aidone, da Messina
- 1352 Abbo Filangeri, da Palermo
- 1353 Antonio Crispo, da Messina
- 1354 Gerardo Opezinghi, da Palermo
- 1355 Arrigo Rosso Count d'Aidone e Sclafani, da Messina
- 1356 Francesco di Ventimiglia, Count of Collesano, Gran Camerlengo del Regno
- 1357 Riccardo Mariscalco
- 1359 Dainiano Spadafora, da Messina. Gilio Stayti, da Trapani
- 1360 Bernardo Raimondo de Monterosso
- 1361 Francesco Emanueli, da Mazzara
- 1363 Giacomo Francone
- 1364 Giacomo la Lamia
- 1363 Tommaso Romano, Baron of Cesarò, da Messina
- 1368 Guerao Gullielm De Sidot
- 1370 Corrado Spadafora, da Messina
- 1371 Gerardo Opezinghi, da Palermo
- 1372 Riccardo Filingeri Baron of Licodia, da Palermo
- 1373 Bernardo Ferro, da Trapani. Gerardo Pizzinga, da Palermo
- 1374 Alanfranco Leontino
- 1375 Tommaso Romano Baron of Cesarò, da Messina
- 1376 Bonaventura Graffeo, Baron of Partanna, da Palermo. Enrico Rosso da Messina
- 1377 Guerao Gullielm De Sidot
- 1378 Matteo di Arizzi, da Siracusa
- 1379 Giovanni Aldobrandini
- 1380 Manfredi d'Aurea, Baron of Catalabiano
- 1381 Federigo d'Aloysio
- 1382 Nicolo Grifalco
- 1383 Ruggiero Asmari
- 1384 Filippo Chiaramonte, da Palermo
- 1385 Pietro Ardoino da Messina
- 1386 Tommaso Spadafora, da Messina
- 1387 Falcone di Falcone
- 1388 Roberto Bonfiglio, da Messina
- 1389 Pietro Bonsignore
- 1390 Luigi Bonaccolsi, da Mantova
- 1391 Tommaso Romano, Baron of Cesarò da Messina
- 1392 Giacobino Campolo, tesoriere del regno, da Messina
- 1393 Guglielmo Borgia (o Boyra)
- 1394 Niccolo d'Orsone
- 1395 Berengario Orioles, da Palermo
- 1396 Francesco Villamari
- 1397 Riccardo Filangieri, da Messina
- 1398 Pietro d'Arbea, di Catalogna
- 1399 Tommaso Spadafora, da Messina

==== 15th century ====
- 1400: Sallimbene Marchese, da Messina
- 1401: Berengario di Orioles, Baron of S. Pieri
- 1402: Giovanni Cruillas, Baron of Francofonte
- 1403: Nicolo d'Orsuna
- 1404: Pietro di Arbea
- 1405: Sallimbene Marchese
- 1401: Francesco Villamari
- 1407: Guglielmo Raimondo Moncada, Count of Adernò, da Palermo
- 1408: Giovanni Crisafi, da Messina
- 1409: Tommaso Romano, Baron of Cesarò, da Messina
- 1410: Pietro d'Arbea
- 1411: Nicolò Castagna, Baron of Monforte, che fu Viceré di Sicilia
- 1412: Ruggiero Pullicino. Tommaso Romano, da Messina
- 1413: Luigi Requesens, da Palermo
- 1414: Riccardo Filangeri, Baron of S. Marco, da Palermo
- 1415: Tommaso Romano, Baron of Cesarò, da Messina
- 1416: Andrea Castelli, da Messina
- 1417: Giovanni Villaragut
- 1418: Antonio Moncada, cavaliere Gerosolimitano, da Messina
- 1419: Orilio Sottili
- 1420: Antonio Castelli, da Messina
- 1421: Giovanni Crisafi, da Messina
- 1422: Raineri Cortino
- 1423: Manfredi Orioles, da Palermo
- 1424: Rinaldo Sortino, siciliano
- 1423: Andrea Castelli
- 1424: Antonio Moncada, cavaliere Gerosolimitano, da Messina
- 1427: Antonio Castelli, da Messina. Manfredi Orioles, da Palermo
- 1428: Francesco Filangeri, da Palermo
- 1429: Antonio Castelli. Salvadore Spatafora, da Messina
- 1430: Giovanni Fernandes d'Heredia
- 1431: Salvadore Spadafora, da Messina
- 1432: Antonio Moncada, cavaliere Gerosolimitano, da Messina
- 1433: Antonio Olzino, da Messina
- 1434: Andrea Paruta, da Palermo
- 1435: Arcimbao Barresi, da Palermo
- 1436: Arrigo Statella, da Catania
- 1437: Francesco Buschetto, Italiano
- 1438: Perricone Belloc, da Palermo
- 1439 Oribio Sottili, Siciliano
- 1440: Adamo Asmundo, da Catania. Antonio la Gunnella
- 1441: Giovanni di Taranto, Baron of Castania
- 1442: Sancio Platamone, da Vizzini
- 1443: Artale d'Alagona, da Palermo
- 1444: Gabriele Abbate, da Trapani
- 1445: Giovanni Montalbo
- 1446: Berengario Gaetani, da Palermo
- 1447: Giovanni Sanoz
- 1448: Antonino di Aragona
- 1449: Berengario Gaetani (per un mese)
- 1449: Pietro Paternò, Baron of Graneri, d'Aragona, Cuba e Sparacogna
- 1450: Giovanni Sanoz
- 1451: Guglielmo Campolo, da Messina
- 1452: Rinaldo Sortino, da Palermo
- 1453: Giovanni Sanoz
- 1454: Giovanni Platamone, da Palermo
- 1455: Giovanni Pertuso
- 1456: Francesco Grasso
- 1457: Antonino Martino, e per sua assenza Stefano de Ponte
- 1458: Pietro Celesti
- 1459: Gabriele Abbate, da Trapani
- 1460: Guglielmo Raimondo Moncada, da Palermo
- 1461: Giovanni Sanez
- 1462: Ughetto di Ventimiglia
- 1463: Giovanni Corbera
- 1465: Rinaldo Sonino, da Palermo
- 1466: Giovanni Valguarnera, da Palermo
- 1467: Pietro Paternò, Baron of Graneri, d'Aragona, Cuba e Sparacogna,
- 1468: Arrigo Statella, da Catania
- 1469: Gaspare Pollicino
- 1470: Giovanni Paternò, III Baron of Terza Dogana
- 1471: Bernardo d'Arguto
- 1472: Pons de Crapa, Aragonese
- 1473: Federigo Crispo, da Messina
- 1474: Giovanni Valguarnera, Count d'Asaro, da Palermo
- 1475: Niccolò Castagna, da Nicosia
- 1476: Raimondo Moncada, da Messina
- 1478: Giulio Centelles, da Palermo
- 1479: Leonardo Filangieri, da Palermo. Ambrosio Moncada, da Messina
- 1480: Luigi Requesens, da Palermo
- 1481: Nicolò Castagna, Siciliano
- 1482: Raimondo Filangieri, da Messina
- 1483: Luigi Requesens, gran Cancelliere
- 1488: Simonetto Settimo, Baron of Giarratana, da Palermo
- 1489: Francesco Riccario, Governatore di Modica
- 1490: Tommaso Girafalco
- 1491: Francesco de Vivirò
- 1492: Francesco Gioeni, da Catania
- 1493: Giovanni Valguarnera, da Palermo
- 1494: Giovanni Villarove
- 1495: Giovanni Centelles, da Palermo
- 1496: Antonio d'Aragona, da Messina
- 1497: Pietro Cardona, Count of Collesano, da Palermo
- 1498: Antonio Patella (ossia Abbatellis), Count of Cammarata, da Palermo

==== 16th century ====
- 1500: Francesco Micenio
- 1501: Tommaso Merullo, Count of Condoianni, da Messina
- 1502: Antonio Giacomo Lavian, Baron of S. Fratello
- 1503: Antonio Abbatellis (ossia Patella), Count of Cammarata. Guglielmo Moncada, da Palermo
- 1504: Nicolò Melchiorre Branciforte, Count of Mazzarino, da Palermo
- 1503: Guglielmo Raimondo Moncada, e per la sua morte, The Count d'Adernò Moncada, da Palermo
- 1506: Francesco di Ventimiglia, di Palermo
- 1507: Vincenzo Luna, da Palermo
- 1509: Francesco di Ventimiglia, di Palermo
- 1510: Giacomo Agliata, Baron of Castellamare, da Palermo
- 1513: Giovanni Valguarnera, da Palermo. Giovanni Luna Count of Caltabellotta, da Palermo
- 1515: Antonio d'Agona
- 1510: Tommaso Marullo, Count of Condaianni, da Messina
- 1517: Giovanni Luna, Count of Caltabellotta
- 1518: Alonzo Cardona, da Palermo
- 1519: Tommaso Marullo, Count of Condoianni
- 1520: Alfonso Siscara, Count d'Ajello. Vincenzo Tagliavia, Baron of Castelvetrano, da Palermo
- 1521: Alonzo Cardona, Count of Riggio
- 1522: Vincenzo Larcano, Count of S. Filadelfo, da Palermo
- 1524: Giulio Cesare Caraffa, Baron of Fiumara di muro, da Napoli
- 1525: Salimbene Marquess, Baron of Scaletta, da Messina
- 1520: Vincenzo Tagliavia Aragona, Count of Castelvetrano, da Palermo
- 1527: Bernardo Requesens, da Palermo
- 1528: Giovanni Marullo, Count of Condagusta, da Messina
- 1529: Francesco Viperos
- 1530: Pompeo Santapau, Marquess of Licodia, da Palermo
- 1532: Giovanni II Ventimiglia, 6th Marquess, 20th Count of Geraci
- 1534: Giovanni Marullo, Count of Condagusta
- 1536: Bernardo Requesens, Baron of Pantelleria, da Palermo
- 1539: Blasco Branciforti, Count of Cammarata, da Palermo
- 1540: Giovanni II Ventimiglia, 6th Marquess, 20th Count of Geraci
- 1542: Ambrogio Santapau, Marquess of Licodia, da Palermo
- 1543: Giovanni Valguarnera, Count d'Asaro, da Palermo
- 1545: Antonio Branciforti, Baron of Mirto, da Palermo
- 1547: Alvaro Ossorio
- 1349: Pietro Luna, Count of Caltabellotta, da Palermo
- 1552: Simone II Ventimiglia, 7th Marquess, 21st Count of Geraci
- 1554: Pietro Urries, signore di Ayarebel, spagnolo: fu ucciso dai Turchi
- 1556: Francesco Moncada, Count d'Adernò, da Palermo
- 1565: Pietro Barresi, Prince of Pietraperzia, da Palermo. Count of Francesco Landriani, presidente del Regno di Sicilia
- 1567: Carlo Ventimiglia, Count of Naso, da Messina. Francesco Santapau, Prince of Butera, of Messina
- 1570: Lorenzo Galletti, Count of Gagliano, da Palermo
- 1572: Francesco Condubat, Marquess d'Arena
- 1574: Giovanni Ossorio, da Palermo
- 1576: Pompeo Colonna, Duke of Zagarola, da Napoli
- 1578: Alfonso Bisbal, Marquess of Briatico, presidente del regno di Sicilia
- 1581: Filippo Borgia
- 1587: Bernardo de Toledo
- 1588: Giovanni III Ventimiglia, 8th Marquess, 12th Count of Geraci
- 1592: Ferdinando Caracciolo, Duke d'Airola, da Napoli
- 1594: Giovanni III Ventimiglia, 8th Marquess, 12th Count of Geraci
- 1595: Gian-Francesco Mancuso giudice straticoziale di Messina, Marquess (famiglia feudataria di Taormina e signora delle baronie di Fiumefreddo e San Basile
- 1597: Vincenzo di Bologna, Marquess of Marineo, da Palermo
- 1598: Francesco del Bosco, Count of Vicari, da Palermo

==== 17th century ====
- 1600: Pietro Borgia Prince of Squillaci
- 1604: Vincenzo Bologna, Marquess of Marineo
- 1606: Ottavio d'Aragona Tagliavia, da Palermo
- 1609: Mariano Migliaccio, Marquess of Monte Maggiore, da Palermo
- 1611: Gregorio Mendozza, Duke d'Agrapoh
- 1613: Antonio Manriquez
- 1616: Lorenzo di Giovanni, Prince of Tre Castagne, da Messina
- 1619: Diego d'Aragona, da Palermo
- 1621: Pietro Balsamo, Prince of Roccafiorita, da Messina
- 1624: Giovanni Grasso
- 1626: Diego Zappata, Marquess of S. Florio
- 1633: Alvaro Perez de Loscado, Marquess of Briatico
- 1634: Alfonso de Cardines
- 1637: Carlo Zerbellone, Prince of Marano
- 1643: Niccolò Placido Branciforte, 6th Prince of Leonforte
- 1645: Girolamo d'Aunzè de Xaverier
- 1646: Luigi Aurifici e Mendozza, Prince of Sarsi
- 1649: Diego Rubin Delely
- 1651: Antonio de Torres
- 1655: Francesco d'Alians
- 1660: Francesco Villapaterna
- 1667: Fabrizio Caracciolo, Duke of Girifalco
- 1670: The Marquess of Ginberg
- 1671: Luigi dell'Hoyo
- 1673: Diego Soria, Marquess of Crispano, consigliere di S. Chiara in Napoli

=== Governors ===
- 1678: Pietro Aldao, Spagnuolo Count of Lovegni, don Fiamingo. Gaspare Borgia, maestro di campo. Giovanni Carrera. Gaspare Borgia.
- 1681: II maestro di campo de la Landette, Feliciano la Ponte.
- 1685: Rodrigo Sodinez Broviedo y Chessada.
- 1688: II maestro di campo, generale dell'artiglieria Correa.
- 1690: Sancio Meranda Ponzale Leon, maestro di campo generale.
- 1702: Feliciano la Ponte, interino. Giovanni d'Acugna, maestro di campo generale.
- 1712: Carlo Emmanuele Count of Rocca ed Ozzasco.
- 1714: The Count Vianzini.
- 1715: Filippo Tona, Marquess d'Entraccles.
- 1716: Luca Spinola, Knight of Jerusalem, Lieutenant General of cavalry.
- 1720: Giorgio Oliverio Count Vallis Tedesco, Baron of Carigmaine.
- 1721: Matteo Giuseppe Marquess of Lucini
- 1722: The Count Vallis.
- 1725: Federigo Count and Prince of Diesbanch
- 1730: Ottone Ferdinando Count of Abensperg and Fraun
- 1733: Giorgio Cristiano Prince of Cobkovitz
- 1734: The Count Marcillac.
- 1738: Giuseppe Grimau y Corbera
- 1754: Domenico Agliata Principe di Villafranca
- 1776: Antonio Gortada y Bru, President of the Kingdom of Sicily.
- 1779: Vincenzo Moncada, Prince of Calvaruso
- 1784: Giovanni Odea, Field Marshal of Ireland
- 1788: Giovanni Danero
- 1799: Alessandro Filangieri, Prince of Cutò
- 1800: Giovanni Battista Guillichini
- 1808: Giovanni Danero.
- 1812: Vincenzo la Grua Talamanca, Prince of Carini
