= Joanna of Austria =

Joanna of Austria may refer to:

- Joanna of Austria, Princess of Portugal (1535–1573)
- Joanna of Austria, Grand Duchess of Tuscany (1547–1578)
- Joanna of Austria, Marchioness of Militello (1573–1630)
- Archduchess Maria Johanna Gabriela of Austria (1750–1762)
