= Barresi =

Barresi is a surname of Italian origin. The Surname is most prevalent in southern italy in the regions of Sicily and Calabria

Notable people with the surname include:

- Cristian Barresi (born 2006), Italian-Australian footballer
- Girolamo Pietraperzia Barresi (c. 1502–1549), Sicilian nobleman
- Joe Barresi, American record engineer and producer
- Paul Barresi (born 1949), American actor, director, and media personality
- Phil Barresi (born 1955), Australian politician
- Wesley Barresi (born 1984), Dutch cricketer.
