= Ambrogio Santapau =

Ambrogio Santapau, 1st Prince of Butera (1518 – 1565), also 5th Marquess of Licodia, was a 16th-century Sicilian nobleman who was created the first Prince of Butera.

== Early life ==
He was the eldest son of Ponzio Santapau, 4th Marquess of Licodia, and Isabella Branciforte (daughter of Niccolò Branciforte, 1st Count of Mazarin, and Belladama d'Alagona and Gaetani, Baroness of Tavi and Baulì). His younger brother was Francesco Santapau, 2nd Prince of Butera (1538–1590). It is likely the Santapau family descended from the branch that included the Catalan admiral Ponce or Ponzio de Santapau.

== Career ==
Upon the death of his father, he became the 5th Marquess of Licodia, however, in 1563 King Philip II of Spain granted him the first title of a Prince in Sicily as Prince of Butera. He had loyally served the royal interests in Sicily as maestro giustiziere, Captain General, and President of Sicily from 1546 to 1548. He was inducted into the Order of the Golden Fleece in 1548. As stratigotus of Messina, he vigorously defended Torre Faro against a pillaging expedition by Hayreddin Barbarossa.

== Personal life ==
He had no offspring and was succeeded by his brother Francesco Santapau.
