= Callari =

Callari is an Italian surname. Notable people of this name include the following:

- Matilde Callari Galli (born 1934), Italian anthropologist, academic and politician
- Sandro Callari (born 1953), Italian cyclist
