= John of Austria =

Spanish military leader (1547–1578)

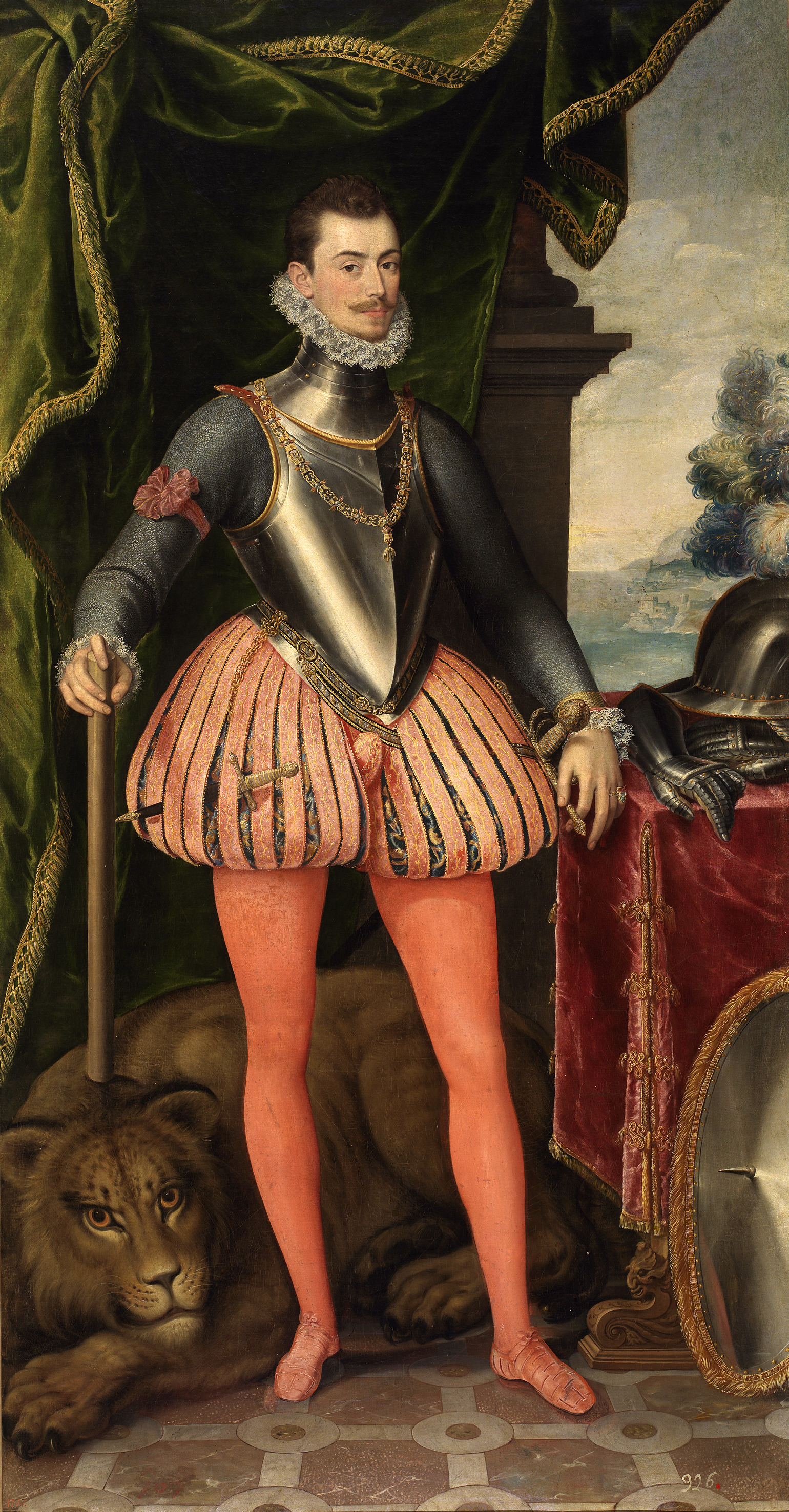
- Don Juan de Austria, oil in canvas of 2nd half of the 16th century, probably by Juan Pantoja de la Cruz, in the Museo del Prado, Madrid

Governor of the Spanish Netherlands
- In office: 1576–1578
- Predecessor: Luis de Requesens y Zúñiga
- Successor: Alexander Farnese, Duke of Parma
- Monarch: Philip II of Spain
- Born: 24 February 1547; Regensburg, Holy Roman Empire
- Died: 1 October 1578 (aged 31); Bouge, near Namur, Spanish Netherlands
- Burial: 24 May 1579; Royal Site of San Lorenzo de El Escorial, Spain
- Issue: See detail
- House: Habsburg
- Father: Charles V, Holy Roman Emperor
- Mother: Barbara Blomberg
- Religion: Roman Catholicism

Military service
- Allegiance: Spanish Empire; Holy League (1571–1573)
- Branch/service: Spanish Navy; Spanish Army
- Years of service: 1568–1578
- Rank: Captain general (Spanish Empire); Generalissimo (Holy League)
- Commands: Mediterranean galley fleet; Army of the Kingdom of Granada; Holy League forces; Army of Flanders
- Battles/wars: See battles: Barbary pirates; Second rebellion of the Alpujarras; Capture of Güéjar; Siege of Galera; Battle of Serón; Capture of Tíjola; Battle of Padules; Ottoman–Habsburg wars; Battle of Lepanto; Siege of Navarino; Tunis expedition; Eighty Years' War; Capture of Namur; Battle of Gembloux; Siege of Nivelles; Siege of Philippeville; Battle of Rijmenam

John of Austria (German: Johann von Österreich, Spanish: Juan de Austria, often called "Don Juan", "Don Juan of Austria", or "Don Juan of Lepanto" in English; 24 February 1547 – 1 October 1578) was the illegitimate son of Charles V, Holy Roman Emperor and a military leader in the service of the Spanish Empire under his half-brother, King Philip II of Spain. He is best known for his role as the admiral of the Holy League fleet at the Battle of Lepanto and as Governor of the Spanish Netherlands.

Born in Regensburg, the son of a burgher's daughter, John was raised in Spain and recognized by Charles V in a codicil. After the death of his father, Philip II of Spain acknowledged him as his half-brother and a Habsburg, granted him the title of a grandee and provided him with a household and an income. In 1568, Philip granted John a military command, and in that capacity John took part in the suppression of corsairs in North Africa as well as a rebellion of the Moriscos in Granada.

On the formation of the Holy League against the Ottoman Empire in 1571, John was designated head of its naval forces by Philip. Under his command, the league inflicted a major defeat on the Ottoman navy off Lepanto in the Gulf of Patras. In 1576, John was named governor-general of the Spanish Netherlands, where he continued the war against the Dutch rebels. He died of a fever in 1578 at the age of 31 and was buried at El Escorial.

== Life ==
=== Early years ===
John of Austria was born in Regensburg, Upper Palatinate. His mother was Barbara Blomberg, the daughter of a burgher, and his father was Charles V, Holy Roman Emperor, who had been widowed since 1539.

In the summer of 1554, he was taken to the castle of Luis de Quijada in Villagarcía de Campos, Valladolid. Magdalena de Ulloa, de Quijada's wife, took charge of his education, assisted by Latin teacher Guillén Prieto, chaplain García de Morales, and Juan Galarza, a squire.

Charles V wrote a codicil, dated 6 June 1554, in which he recognized: "For since I was in Germany, after being widowed, I had a natural child of one unmarried woman, named Geronimo". In the summer of 1558, Charles ordered de Quijada, de Ulloa, and John to relocate to the village of Cuacos de Yuste. Charles resided nearby at the Monastery of Yuste, and until his own death in September of that year, he saw his son several times. In his last will of 1558, he officially recognized John as his son; he also arranged for John to enter the clergy and pursue an ecclesiastical career.

Charles's only surviving legitimate son and heir, Philip II of Spain, was then outside of Spain. Rumors had spread about John's paternity, which de Quijada denied, and he wrote to Charles asking for instructions. Charles replied with a note written by his personal secretary Eraso, in which he recommended to wait for Philip's return to Spain. Joanna, Dowager Princess of Portugal and regent during the absence of her brother Philip, asked to see the child. She met him in Valladolid in May 1559, coinciding with an auto-da-fé then taking place.

Philip II returned from Brussels in 1559, aware of his father's will. Once he had settled in Valladolid, he summoned de Quijada to bring John to a hunt. The first meeting between Philip and John took place on 28 September in the Monastery of Santa María de La Santa Espina. When the king appeared, de Quijada told John to dismount as a sign of respect. When John did so, Philip asked him if he knew the identity of his father; he did not, so Philip explained that they had the same father and thus were brothers. Philip insisted that, although John was a member of the House of Habsburg, he was not to be addressed as "Your Highness", the form reserved for royals and sovereign princes.

John was known as "Don Juan de Austria", and his manner of address was "Your Excellency", the title used for a Spanish grandee. He did not live in a palace, but maintained a separate household with de Quijada as the head. Philip allowed John to have the income allocated to him by Charles. In public ceremonies, John stood, walked, or rode ahead of the grandees, but behind the royal family.

=== Formative years ===
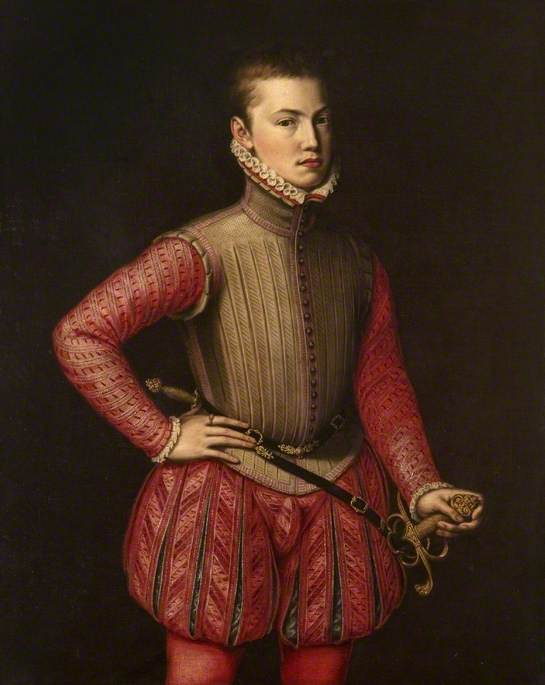
Portrait of Don Juan by Jooris van der Straeten

John completed his education at the University of Alcalá de Henares (now the Complutense University of Madrid), where he attended with his two nephews: Prince Carlos, son and heir of Philip II, and Alessandro Farnese, the son of Charles V's other acknowledged illegitimate child, Margaret of Austria, Duchess of Parma. All three were taught by Honorato Hugo, the disciple of scholar Juan Luis Vives. While at the university, Carlos sustained a skull fracture, resulting in personality changes.

In 1562, the royal house assigned John 15,000 ducats, the same amount allocated to his half-sister Joanna, Dowager Princess of Portugal, with whom John had a close relationship.

In 1565, Farnese left Alcalá de Henares to reside in Brussels, where his mother governed the Spanish Netherlands. He married Maria of Portugal while in Brussels.

John actively participated in court ceremonies, including at the baptisms of his nieces, Isabella Clara Eugenia and Catherine Michaela. He was assigned to carry the infants to the baptismal font.

In 1565, the Ottoman Empire attacked Malta. To defend the island, a fleet was gathered at the port of Barcelona. John asked Philip for permission to join the navy, but was denied; he then left the court and travelled to Barcelona, but was unable to reach the fleet in time. John continued his attempts to join the fleet of García Álvarez de Toledo y Osorio until a letter from Philip caused him to give up.

Prince Carlos confided in John and told him of his plans to flee Spain and travel towards the Spanish Netherlands from Italy. He needed John's help to acquire a galley that would ferry him to Italy. In exchange for his assistance, the prince promised John control of the Kingdom of Naples. John said that he would give Carlos an answer, and went to El Escorial to report him to the king.

John returned to the Mediterranean to take charge of the fleet. After meeting with his advisers in Cartagena on 2 June 1568, he went out to sea to fight the corsairs for a period of three months. He sailed to North Africa, landing at Oran and Melilla.

=== Rebellion of the Alpujarras ===
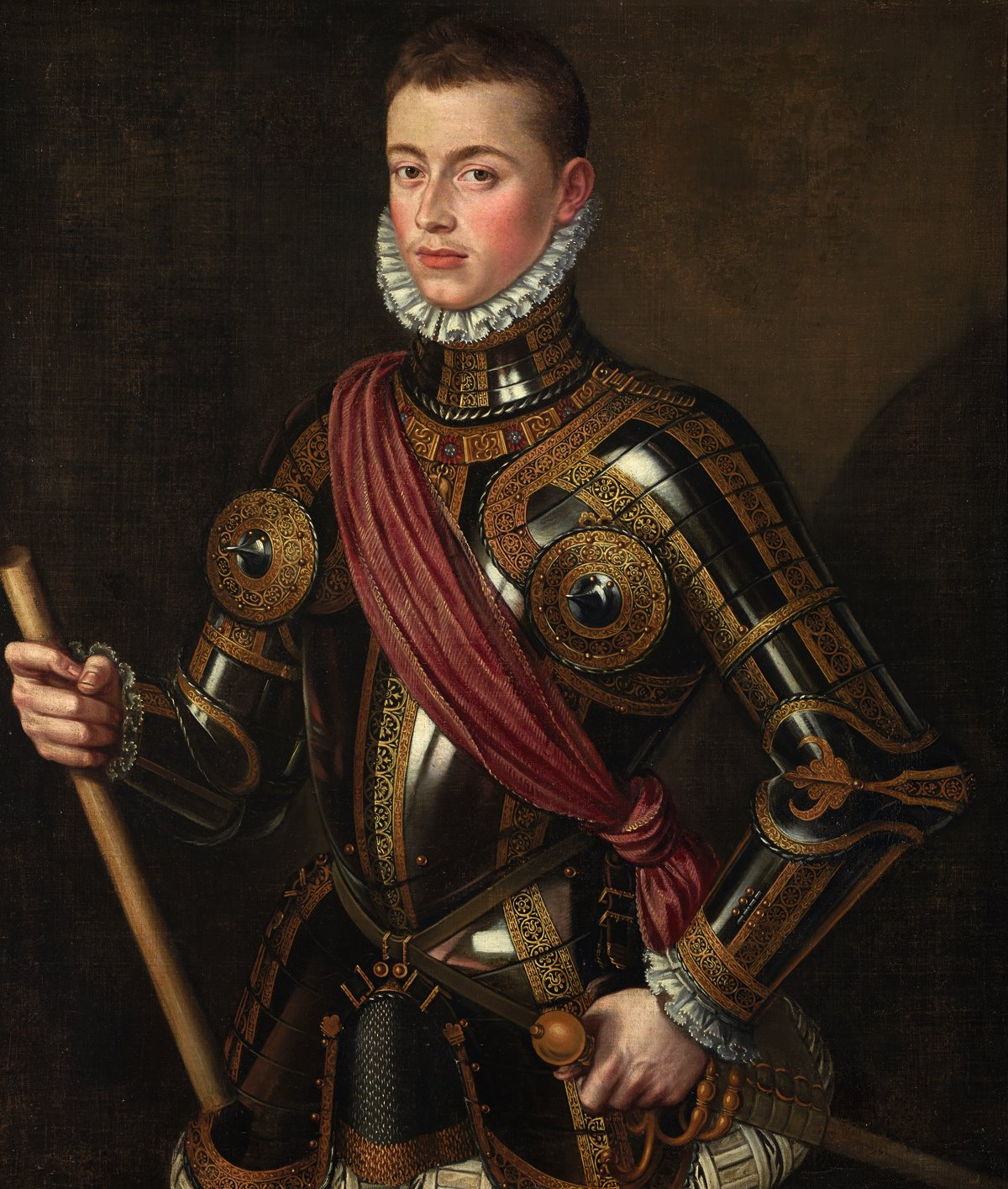
John of Austria in armour, by Alonso Sánchez Coello, 1567

A decree dated 1 January 1567 forced the Moriscos who lived in the Kingdom of Granada, particularly in the Alpujarras region, to abandon their customs, language, clothing, and religious practices. By the end of 1568, almost 200 towns revolted against the decree.

Philip deposed Iñigo López de Mendoza, 3rd Marquis of Mondejar, and appointed John the supreme commander of the royal forces. He chose Luis de Requesens to serve as one of John's advisers.

On 13 April 1569 John arrived in Granada, where he built his forces. Luis de Requesens and Álvaro de Bazán patrolled the coast with their galleys, limiting aid and reinforcements from Barbary.

The deportation policy aggravated the situation. John asked Philip for permission to go on the offensive. The king granted his request and John left Granada at the head of a large and well-supplied army. After clearing rebels from nearby Granada, he marched east through Guadix, where veteran troops from Italy joined him, increasing his number of troops to 12,000.

At the end of 1569 he managed to pacify Güéjar, and in late January 1570 he laid siege to the stronghold of Galera, which was located some 150 km from the Alpujarras, on the Granada Altiplano, another center of Moorish revolt. The siege of Galera stalled because the inhabitants retreated into a fortified Alcazaba or fortress on a hill in the center of Galera, so John ordered a general assault, making use of artillery and strategically set mines. On 10 February 1570, he entered the village, and had it levelled to the ground with salt ploughed into its soil. Between 400 and 4,500 inhabitants were killed, and 2,000–4,500 more were sold into slavery.

When he marched on the fortress of Serón, John was shot in the head, and his foster father Luis de Quijada was wounded. De Quijada died of his injuries a week later, on 25 February, in Caniles. John took the town of Terque, which dominated the middle valley of the Almería River.

In May 1570, John negotiated a peace with El Habaquí. In the summer and fall of 1570, the last campaigns to subdue the rebels were carried out. In February 1571, Philip signed a decree expelling all Moriscos from the Kingdom of Granada. John's letters described their forced exile as the greatest "human misery" that can be portrayed.

=== The War of Cyprus and Battle of Lepanto ===
Battle of Lepanto

The War of Cyprus became the focus of Spanish attention after Pope Pius V sent an envoy to urge Philip to join him and Venice in a Holy League against the Turks. Philip II agreed, and negotiations opened in Rome. Among Philip's terms was the appointment of John as commander-in-chief of the Holy League armada. He agreed that Cyprus should be protected, but also wished to recover control of Tunis, where the Turks had overthrown Philip's Muslim client ruler. Tunis posed an immediate threat to Sicily, one of Philip's kingdoms. He also had in mind the eventual conquest of Algiers, whose corsairs posed a constant nuisance to Spain. Charles V had tried and failed to take it in 1541.

While John finished the pacification of Granada, negotiations continued in Rome. In the summer of 1570, Philip sailed for Cyprus under the pope's admiral Marcantonio Colonna. In charge of Philip's contingent was the Genoese Gian Andrea Doria, a great-nephew of Andrea Doria. On reaching the Turkish coast in September, Colonna and the Venetians wished to continue towards Cyprus while Doria argued that it was too late. Then, news arrived that Nicosia, the capital of Cyprus, had fallen, and only the port of Famagusta remained. Sickness hit the Venetian fleet and a consensus grew that it was best to return to port, which they did. Animosities between the Christian allies became more open while the Turks continued their siege of Famagusta.

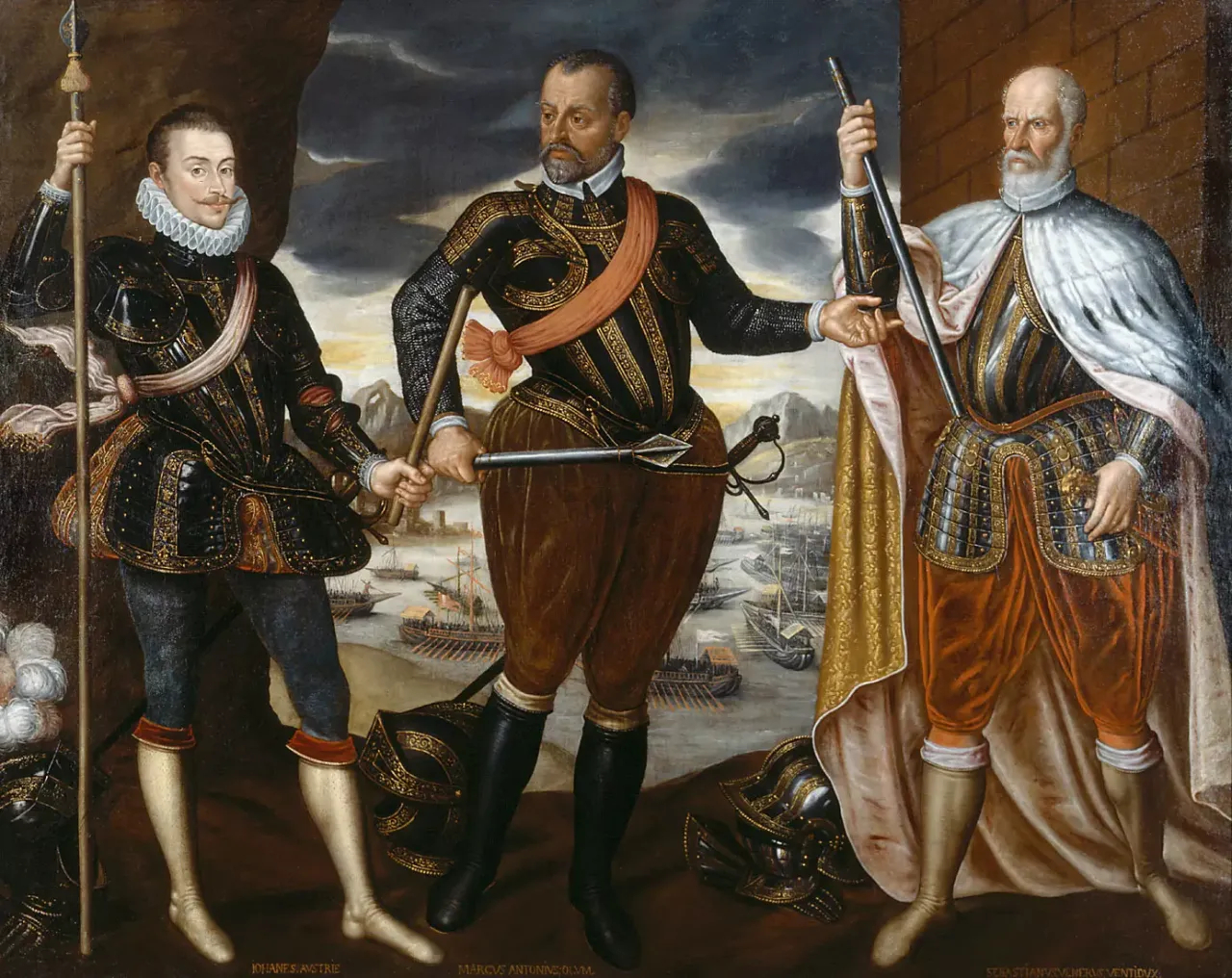
The Victors of Lepanto (from left: Don Juan de Austria, Marcantonio Colonna, Sebastiano Venier)

The Venetians repaired their galley fleet and readied six armed galleasses. The pope hired twelve galleys from the Grand Duke of Tuscany. The dukes of Savoy and Parma also provided galleys, and Alexander Farnese sailed in one of them. When the League was formally signed in May, John was designated commander-in-chief and given instructions by Philip. He travelled with the Spanish squadron from Barcelona in July, and the Holy League armada set sail from Messina in mid-September.

John found the Turkish fleet at Lepanto in the Gulf of Corinth. After some debate amongst themselves, The Turks chose to fight. They had the larger fleet, nearly 300 vessels to John's 207 galleys and six galleasses.

On 7 October 1571, the Turkish fleet emerged into the Gulf of Patras and took battle formation. Bringing his fleet through the Curzolaris islets, John deployed his armada into a left wing under Venetian command, a right wing under Doria, a center under himself, and a rear guard under the Marquis of Santa Cruz. In all four formations were galleys from each of the participating states. Two galleasses each were assigned to the wings and center.

Before the battle, John then harangued the fleet from a small boat: "fight with faith in His Holy Name, for whether dead or victorious you will enjoy immortality." In order to motivate them further, when he came to his galley's forecastle, he danced a Spanish galliard with two other captains to the sound of fifes.

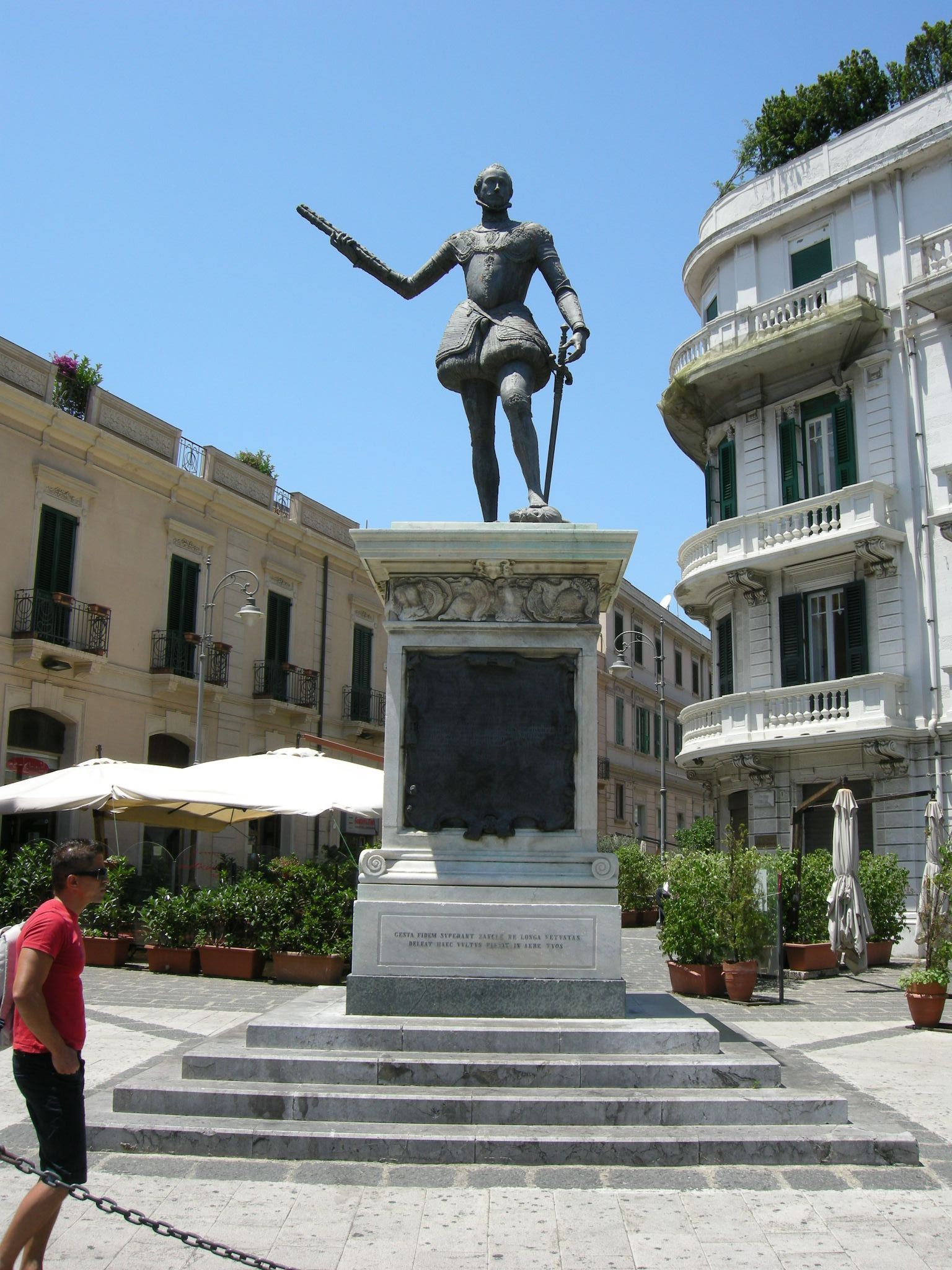
John of Austria monument in Messina

The battle began around noon. The gunfire from the galleasses disrupted the Turkish formations as they pressed to the attack, and the bigger and more numerous guns of the Christian allies did damage as the Turkish right and center closed to board. The allies won the fighting on the decks. Among the wounded was 24-year-old Miguel de Cervantes, future writer of Don Quixote. Cervantes later wrote a description of the courage of the Christian combatants.

The Turkish left wing under Uluj Ali, the governor general of Algiers, tried to outmaneuver Doria's wing, drawing it away from the League center. When a gap appeared between Doria and the center, Uluj Ali turned and aimed at the gap, smashing three galleys of the Knights of Malta on John's right flank. John came around while the Marquis of Santa Cruz hit Uluj Ali with his rear guard. Uluj Ali and approximately half of his wing escaped.

At the end of the battle, the Turkish fleet was destroyed and thousands of Turkish soldiers were killed. The League had over 13,000 casualties and liberated over 10,000 Christian slaves. In the evening, a storm broke and the League had to head for port, while sporadic Greek uprisings were suppressed by the Turks.

During and after the battle of Lepanto, John was addressed in letters and in person with "Highness" and "Prince", in contradiction to the initial protocol and address by Philip. There are no records to indicate if Philip gave Don John these honors.

=== The Low Countries ===
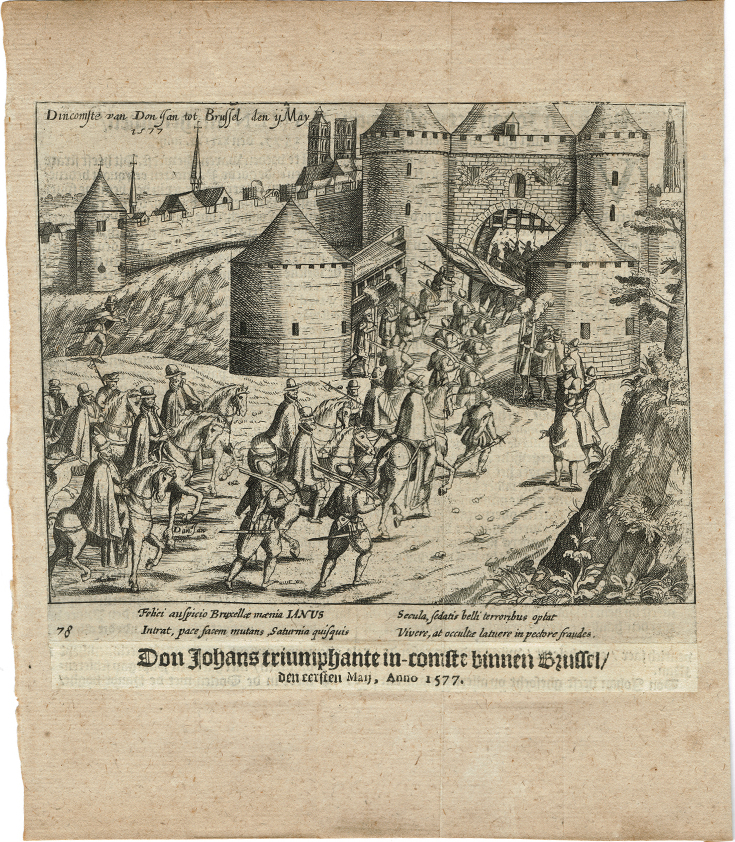
The Joyous Entry of John of Austria into Brussels, 1 May 1577. Print from 'The Wars of Nassau' by W. Baudartius, Amsterdam 1616

When Luis de Requesens died on 5 March 1576, the Council of State urged the king to appoint a new governor immediately, recommending that it be a member of the royal family. Philip appointed John as governor-general; John entered Brussels on 1 May 1577.

John captured the city of Namur on 24 July 1577. In January 1578 he defeated the Protestants in the Battle of Gembloux. The defeat at Gembloux forced Prince William of Orange, the leader of the revolt, to leave Brussels. The victory of John also meant the end of the Union of Brussels, and hastened the disintegration of the unity of the rebel provinces. Six months later John was defeated at Rijmenam.

=== Death ===
Two months after his defeat at Rijmenam, John of Austria contracted a fever and died on 1 October 1578, at the age of 31. To avoid his body being captured at sea by adversarial Dutch or English forces, it was quartered, returned secretly overland in saddle bags to Madrid, and reassembled for burial once there. John was buried in the Escorial, the only illegitimate Habsburg to be so honored.

== Coat of arms ==
Coat of arms of John of Austria

As John of Austria was the illegitimate son of Charles V, the partitions of the armories of his father's coat of arms were modified for his own. John's coat of arms consisted of a divided shield; on the dexter (left) side, the arms of Castile and León were placed in a cut and not quartered (repeated in four quarters), as usual; on the sinister (right) side were Aragon and Aragon-Sicily; and on the divided inescutcheon (center) were Austria and Duchy of Burgundy.

The coat of arms of John of Austria did not incorporate the blazons of Granada, Franche-Comté, Brabant, Flanders, and Tyrol that appeared in the coat of arms of his father. Encircling the shield is the necklace of the Order of the Golden Fleece.

== Relationships and descendants ==
The following women are confirmed to have had a relationship with John of Austria:

- Maria of Mendoza (1545 – 22 April 1570), lady-in-waiting of Joanna of Austria, Princess of Portugal and daughter of Diego Hurtado of Mendoza, Prince of Melito and 1st Duke of Francavilla. They had one daughter:
  - Maria Ana of Austria (November 1569, Villagarcía de Campos, Madrid – 27 November 1629, Las Huelgas, Burgos), who later became Abbess of Santa María la Real de Las Huelgas since 1611.
- Diana Falangola (born 1556), daughter of Scipione Falangola, Lord of Fagnano. They had a daughter:
  - Juana of Austria (11 September 1573, Naples – 7 February 1630, Militello), who married at Palermo on 20 April 1603 Francesco Branciforte, 2nd Prince of Pietraperzia. They had five daughters:
    - Margherita Branciforte d'Austria (11 January 1605, Naples – 24 January 1659, Rome), Princess of Butera; married Federico Colonna, 5th Duke of Tagliacozzo, with whom she had one son:
      - Antonio Colonna, Prince of Pietraperzia (1619–1623)
    - Flavia Branciforte d'Austria (3 June 1606, Naples – 24 May 1608, Naples)
    - Caterina Branciforte d'Austria (4 May 1609, Naples – 6 June 1613, Naples)
    - Elisabetta Branciforte d'Austria (9 December 1611, Naples – 7 August 1615, Naples)
    - Anna Branciforte d'Austria (6 July 1615, Naples – 1 September 1615, Naples)
- Zenobia Saratosia (born ca. 1540), daughter of Vincenzo Saratosia and Violante Garofano. They had one son:
  - Unnamed (born and died in 1574); reportedly died at childbirth, although it was rumoured that Philip II had a hand in his death.
- Anne of Toledo, with whom he had no known children.

== Legacy ==
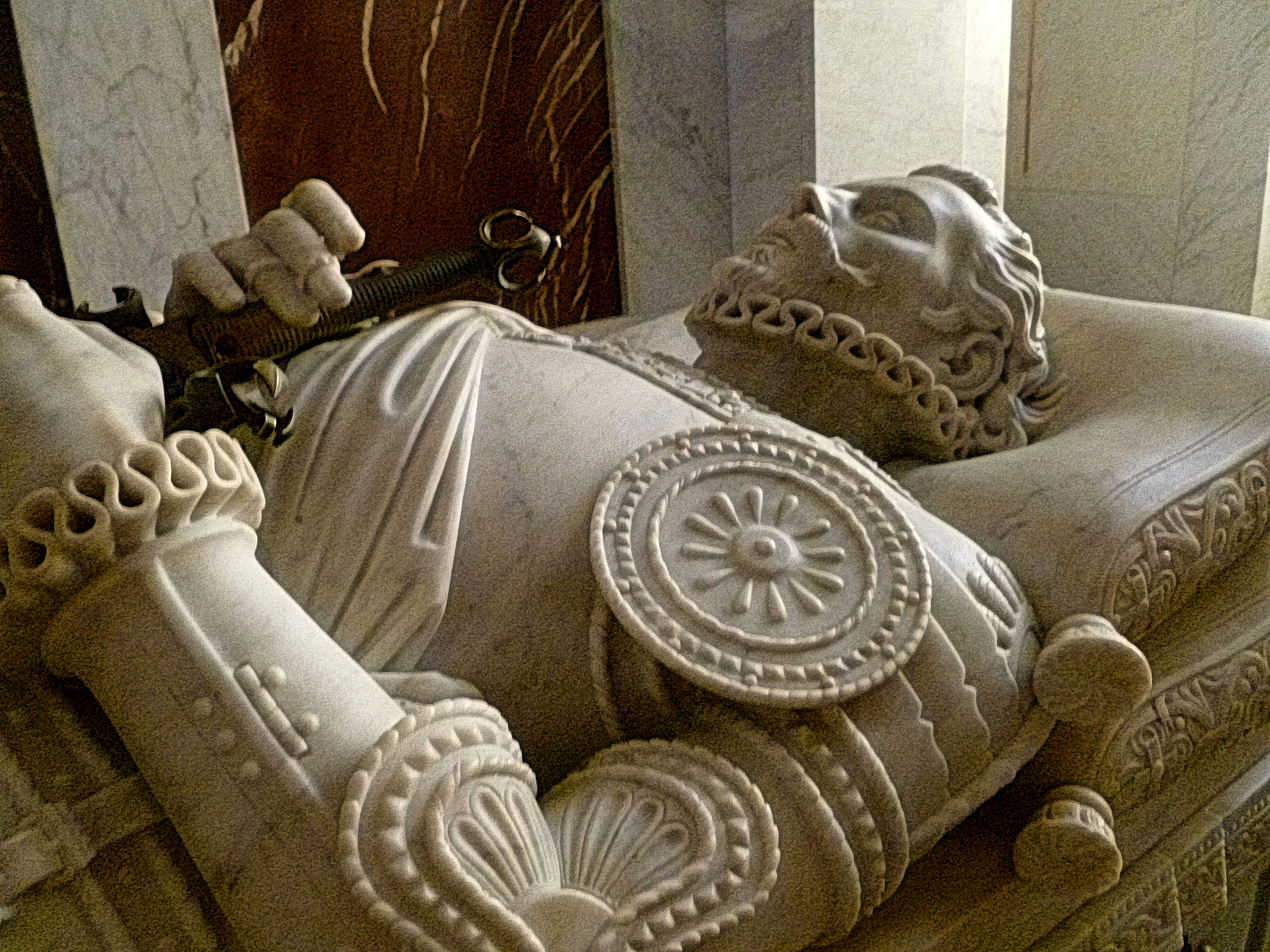
Tomb of John of Austria by Giuseppe Galeotti (according to a design by Ponzano) in the fifth chamber of the Pantheon in the Monastery of San Lorenzo de El Escorial, Spain

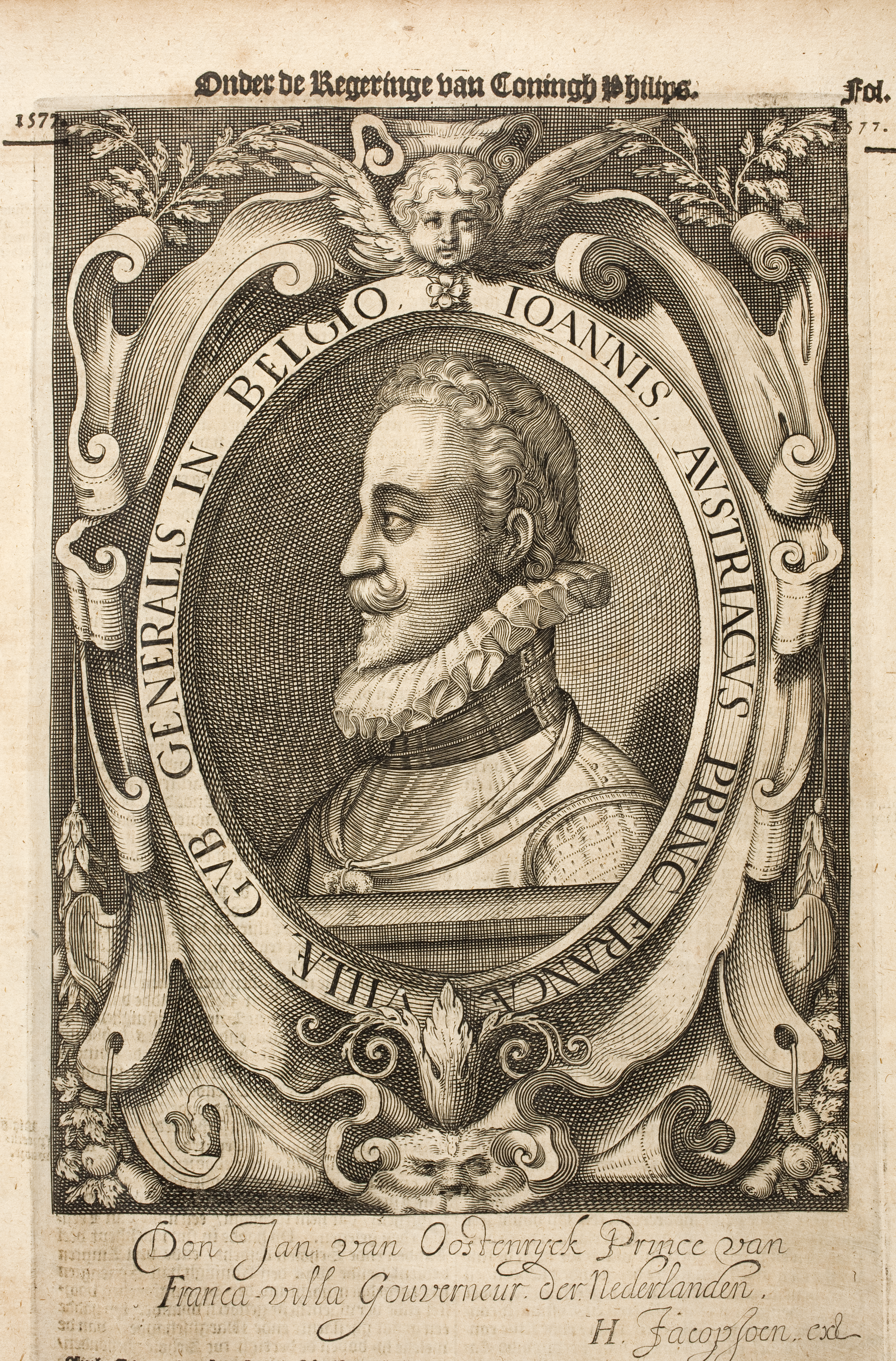
Engraving of John of Austria

A monument to John of Austria was erected in Messina at the initiative of the local senate in 1572, to honor the victor of Lepanto. The statue survived the devastating 1908 earthquake; however, it was moved to another location in the city.

A copy of the statue of John in Messina was erected in his birthplace of Regensburg in 1978, the fourth centenary of his death.

=== In literature ===
- A "Don John" is a villain in William Shakespeare's 1599 play Much Ado About Nothing. He is listed in the dramatis personae as "illegitimate brother to Don Pedro", Prince of Aragon.
- Don John of Austria's life inspired the 1835 play Don Juan d'Autriche by Casimir Delavigne, which served in turn as a source for two operas, Don John of Austria by Isaac Nathan in 1847 and Don Giovanni d'Austria by Filippo Marchetti in 1879.
- G. K. Chesterton in 1911 published a poem, Lepanto, in which he dubbed Don John "the last knight of Europe".
- The historical novel A Knight of Spain (1913) by Marjorie Bowen depicts the relationship between Don John of Austria and his half-brother, Philip.
- The historical romance, Spanish Lover, by Frank H. Spearman (Charles Scribner's Sons, 1930), has Don John as its central character.
- In 1956, Louis de Wohl published The Last Crusader: A Novel about Don Juan of Austria, presenting Don John of Austria as one of history's most triumphant and inspiring heroes.
- The 1990 historical novel La visita en el tiempo by Venezuelan writer Arturo Uslar Pietri depicts Don Juan searching for his own identity, his journey from an orphaned childhood to his transformation into the (illegitimate) son of Emperor Charles V and the hero of Lepanto. The novel won the 1991 Rómulo Gallegos Prize novel prize.

== Bibliography ==
- Coloma, Luis (1912). The Story of Don John of Austria. Translated by Lady A.M. Moreton. London: John Lane, The Bodley Head.
- Capponi, Niccolò (2007). Victory of the West: The Great Christian-Muslim Clash at the Battle of Lepanto. U.S.: Da Capo Press. ISBN 978-0-306-81544-7.
- Dennis, Amarie (1966). Don Juan of Austria: The Imperial Bastard. Madrid: Ed. Rivadeneyra.
- Ferrandis Torres, Manuel (1939). Don Juan de Austria: paladín de la cristiandad (in Spanish). Zaragoza: Ediciones Luz.
- Guilmartin, John Francis (2003). Gunpowder and Galleys: Changing Technology and Mediterranean Warfare at Sea in the 16th Century (2nd ed.). London: Conway Maritime Press. ISBN 978-0-851-77951-5.
- Petrie, Charles (1967). Don John of Austria. London: Eyre & Spottiswoode.
- Stirling-Maxwell, William (1883). Don John of Austria, or Passages from the History of the Sixteenth Century, 1547-1578. Vol. I. London: Longmans, Green, and Co.
- Stirling-Maxwell, William (1883). Don John of Austria, or Passages from the History of the Sixteenth Century, 1547-1578. Vol. II. London: Longmans, Green, and Co.
- Van der Hammen y León, Lorenzo (1627). Sánchez, Luis (ed.). Don Juan de Austria. Historia (PDF) (in Spanish). Madrid.

Political offices
Preceded by Luis de Zúñiga y Requesens	Governor of the Spanish Netherlands; 1576–1578	Succeeded by Alexander Farnese, Duke of Parma
