= Laura Lanza =

Italian noblewoman

- Born: Laura Lanza di Trabia; 1529; Trabia, Sicily
- Died: 4 December 1563 (aged 33–34); Carini, Sicily
- Occupation: noblewoman
- Known for: murdered, allegedly by her father, for having committed adultery
- Spouse: Don Vincenzo II La Grua-Talamanca (m. 1543)
- Children: 8
- Parents: Cesare Lanza, Baron of Trabia and Count of Mussomeli (father); Lucrezia Gaetani (mother)

Laura Lanza, Baroness of Carini (1529 – 4 December 1563) was an Italian noblewoman who was murdered, allegedly by her father, in Carini, Sicily, for having committed adultery.

== Biography ==
Laura Lanza di Trabia was born to Cesare Lanza, Baron of Trabia and Count of Mussomeli, and Lucrezia Gaetani. She had a younger sister named Giovanna and two half-siblings from her father's second wife, Castellana Centelles: Ottavio, 1st Prince of Trabia, and Margherita. She was born in Trabia and spent her adolescence in Palermo. On 14 December 1543, at the age of fourteen, Laura was married to Don Vincenzo II La Grua-Talamanca, son of the baron of Carini Pietro III and Eleonora Manriquez. After that, she moved to their castle, where she gave birth to eight children.

== Murder ==
On 4 December 1563 Laura was caught with her lover, Ludovico Vernagallo, a cousin of her husband's. This resulted in a crime of passion, and they were murdered in her bedchamber in the Carini Castle. Her father, Cesare Lanza, Count of Trabia, confessed to the killing in a letter which he wrote to Philip II of Spain, but her husband was also suspected on account of rumors that he planned to marry again. It is also believed that La Grua-Talamanca may have killed Vernagallo to prevent Vernagallo from receiving the Lanza inheritance if he had an illegitimate child with Lanza. One reason proposed for Cesare being willing to accept the blame is that the crime qualified as an honor killing and therefore socially acceptable by the Italian nobility at the time.

The confessional letter is housed at the Cathedral in Carini.

King Philip II granted pardons to the murderers, who cited medieval law in their defense. La Grua did marry again in 1565 to Ninfa Ruiz, who died less than a year after their marriage.

== Legacy ==
There is a popular legend that, on the anniversary of Baroness Lanza's murder, her bloody handprint will appear on a particular spot on her chamber wall.

The mayor of Carini, in conjunction with a project to restore the famed castle to its 16th-century appearance, has reopened the case for forensic study.

In 2007, Italian state television (RAI) aired a two-part drama with the role of the Baroness played by Italian actress, Vittoria Puccini.

An Italian TV miniseries L'amaro caso della baronessa di Carini was released in November 1975, starring Janet Ågren and Ugo Pagliai.

In the 1990 film The Godfather Part III, Michael Corleone and Kay watches a play depicting the story, which mirrors the relationship of Vincent and Mary Corleone in the film.
