= House of Lanza =

Italian noble family

Lanza Italian: Casa di Lanza
- Sicilian noble family
- Motto: "The Principal" (Latin: Principalior Omnium)
- Parent family: Lancia family
- Country: Italy Former countries: Kingdom of Sicily; Papal States; Kingdom of the Two Sicilies; Kingdom of Italy
- Founded: 15th century
- Founder: Blasco Lanza
- Titles: Prince of Trabia; Prince of Butera; Prince of Campofiorito; Prince of Pietraperzia; Prince of Scalea; Prince of Scordia; Duke of Camastra
- Cadet branches: Lanza-Branciforte; Lanza-d'Ajeta; Lanza-Filangieri

Lanza are an Italian noble family that originated in Sicily in the 15th century. Derived from a cadet branch of the Lancia family, barons of Longi, it represents one of the major dynasties of the Sicilian aristocracy.

Over the centuries, this family was at the top of political and economic power on the island, with its exponents holding the highest institutional, civil and military positions in the Kingdom of Sicily. After the eldest branch of the Princes of Trabia became extinct in the first half of the 20th century, the Lanza Branciforte family is represented by the collateral line of the Princes Lanza of Scalea.

== History ==
The proven founder of the family was Blasco Lanza (1466-1535), a lawyer from Catania belonging to a cadet branch of the noble Lancia family of the Barons of Longi. He became a feudal lord with the acquisition of the land of Trabia, in the Val di Mazara (1498), and of the barony of Castania, in the Val Demone (1507), both possessions received in dowry jure uxoris. On the land of Trabia he was investitured with the title of baron with a privilege given by King Ferdinand II of Aragon on 14 November 1509, made executive on 11 June 1510. He was twice a deputy of the Kingdom of Sicily (1508 and 1514) and royal councilor from 1517.

Blasco was succeeded in titles and fiefs by his son Cesare Lanza Tornabene, 2nd Baron of Trabia († 1593), born from his second union. Known as Cesare, he was a mastroportulano (1537), governor of the Compagnia della Carità of Palermo (1546), ambassador to Palermo of the Charles V of Habsburg, and four times praetor of Palermo (1548, 1555, 1556 and 1560). In 1549 he purchased the land and castle of Mussomeli, in the Val di Mazara, on which he was invested with the title of count by privilege given on 11 January 1564 by King Philip III of Spain, executed on 27 November, for military services rendered to Charles V by his father. Father of nine children from two different unions, he was succeeded in titles and fiefs by the eldest of his sons from the second marriage, Ottavio Lanza de Centelles, 2nd Count of Mussomeli (1547-1617), who was vicar general and captain general of the arms of the Kingdom of Sicily, who by privilege given on 22 July 1601 by King Philip III of Spain, executed on 13 November of the same year, was granted the title of 1st prince of Trabia. From his union with the noblewoman Giovanna Orteca Gioeni Paternò of the barons of Valcorrente, he had four children, including Lorenzo, 3rd Count of Mussomeli († 1612), who, having predeceased him, could not succeed him in the possession of the titles and family fiefdoms, which his nephew Ottavio took possession of upon his death. Another son of Count Cesare was Blasco, a priest and probably a Jerusalem knight from 1557.

Ottavio Lanza Barrese, 2nd Prince of Trabia († 1675), was deputy of the Kingdom of Sicily and vicar general in Sciacca in 1647. He married Giovanna Lucchese Spinola, 2nd Duchess of Camastra, last descendant of a branch of the family Lucchese Palli, and through this union he received the Duchy of Camastra and the County of Sommatino as a dowry. From this union five children were born including: Lorenzo, 5th Count of Mussomeli († 1660); Giuseppe, 3rd Duke of Camastra († 1708), who was a soldier, deputy of the Kingdom of Sicily (1668), captain of justice (1672) and praetor of Palermo (1679), vicar general of Syracuse, Augusta, and Gela (1676) and of the Val di Noto and Val Demone (1693); Giacomo († 1710), invested with the title of 1st Prince of Lanza by privilege given in 1677; Cesare, knight of the Order of Calatrava, III Prince of Buonfornello since 1684, title acquired by marriage to Anna Bellacera Giglio, widow of Blasco Alliata Galletti, who left no descendants.

Through Giuseppe, who first married Maria Gomez de Silveira Ferreri, the Lanzas acquired by succession in 1675 possession of the Principality of Santo Stefano and the baronies of Pettineo and Migaudo. The eldest son Lorenzo, who married Luisa Moncada Gaetani of the Princes of Paternò, fathered two children, Giovanna and Ottavio, III prince of Trabia († 1720), who was a deputy of the Kingdom of Sicily (1680). Said Ottavio, in 1713, as peer of the Kingdom, welcomed Duke Victor Amadeus II of Savoy in Palermo for the royal coronation. He married Lucrezia Reggio Saladino of the Princes of Campofiorito, with whom he had four children, of whom his successor in titles and fiefs was Ignazio, 4th prince of Trabia (1693-1753), who was captain of justice (1717) and praetor of Palermo (1739) and deputy of the Kingdom of Sicily (1723). He married his cousin Giovanna Lanza Castello, his uncle's only daughter and heir paternal Giuseppe, Duke of Camastra, who brought him the Principality of Santo Stefano and the Duchy of Camastra as dowry, and made him the father of four children, including Giuseppe, V Prince of Trabia, and Antonino (1728-1775), Theatine cleric who was bishop of Agrigento.

Giuseppe Lanza, 5th prince of Trabia (1719-1783), was captain of justice (1762–64) and praetor of Palermo (1768–80), vicar general for the fight against banditry (from 1767), deputy of the Kingdom of Sicily (1778–80), maestroportulano, protomedico and president of the Royal Patrimonio, ambassador of the Senate of Palermo to King Charles III and gentleman of the chamber with exercise of the King of Naples and Sicily. He had seven children, born from his second marriage with Orietta Stella Valguarnera of the Dukes of Mirto, of which the eldest son Ignazio, VI Prince of Trabia (1758-1784), governor of the Compagnia della Pace of Palermo ( 1779), who, having died without leaving descendants, was succeeded in the family titles and fiefs by his younger brother Pietro, VII Prince of Trabia (1759-1811), invested in 1789, who was captain of justice of Palermo (1792), secretary of State and court master of the King of Naples and Sicily. Known as Pietro, he married Anna Maria Branciforte Valguarnera of the Princes of Scordia, who made him the father of five children.

Giuseppe Lanza Branciforte, VIII Prince of Trabia (1780-1855), son of Pietro, eminent archaeologist and collector, was peer of the Kingdom of Sicily (1812 and 1848) and Minister of Ecclesiastical Affairs of the Kingdom of the Two Sicilies (1841–48). He married Stefania Branciforte and Branciforte of the Princes of Butera and Scordia, the last descendant of his lineage, and through this union which gave him six children, all the titles and assets of the Branciforte family came as dowry to the Princes of Trabia, whose members since then assumed the double surname Lanza Branciforte . The eldest son Pietro Lanza Branciforte, 9th Prince of Trabia (1807-1855), historian, was magistrate of Palermo (1835, 1837 and 1848) and minister of public works and then of foreign affairs of the provisional government of Sicily (1848–49), died in exile in France. He married the Neapolitan noblewoman Eleonora Spinelli Caracciolo, princess of Scalea and duchess of Misuraca, last descendant of her lineage who brought him as dowry all her titles and assets of which she was heir, and with whom he fathered six children, including Francesco (1834-1919) from whom the cadet branch of the Princes of Scalea originated, and Stefania (1842-1925), who was lady of the palace to Queen Margherita.

The titles of the Lanza Branciforte family of the Princes of Trabia obtained legal recognition from the Kingdom of Italy with a ministerial decree of 5 May 1899 to Pietro Lanza Branciforte Galeotti, XI Prince of Trabia (1868-1929), son of Giuseppe, X Prince of Trabia ( 1833-1868). Known as Pietro, he was a municipal councilor of Palermo, a deputy and senator in the national parliament between the XVIII and XXVIII legislatures. He was the father of Giuseppe, Prince of Scordia (1889-1927), deputy several times, Ignazio (1890-1917) and Manfredi (1894-1918), the latter lieutenants of the Royal Italian Army in the First World War, in which they obtained the Medal of silver for military valor. Since they died celibate before their father, and without leaving legitimate descendants, Prince Pietro was succeeded in titles by his younger brother Ottavio.

Ottavio Lanza Branciforte Galeotti, XII Prince of Trabia (1863-1938), created Duke Lanza Branciforte with Royal Decree motu proprio of 9 March 1905, and Royal Letters Patent of 21 December of the same year, was an officer of the Royal Army and senator of the Kingdom of Italy in the XXIX legislature. Having obtained no issue from his marriage to the French noblewoman Rose-Blanche Rose Ney d'Elchingen of the Dukes of Elchingen, upon his death all titles passed to members of the cadet branch of the Lanza Princes of Scalea.

== See also ==
- Italian nobility
- Giuseppe Lanza
- Laura Lanza
- Raimondo Lanza di Trabia

== Notes ==
- Marquis Corrado Lanza Marcatobianco, A laurel to the true, enthusiasm , ed. Borel and Bompard, Naples, 1837;
- Federico Lancia and Grassellini, Dei Lancia or Lanza di Brolo family tree and biographies , ed. Gaudieno, 1879;
- Mango by Casalgerardo A., The nobility of Sicily , Palermo, 1915, vols. 2, passim;
- Giuseppe Sorge, Mussomeli from the origin to the abolition of feudality , vol. II, Catania 1916, then Edizioni Ristampe Siciliane, Palermo 1982.
- San Martino de Spucches F., The history of the feuds and noble titles of Sicily , Palermo, 1924, vols. 10, passim;
- Ganci M., The great titles of the Kingdom of Sicily, Palermo - Siracusa, 1988, 209;
- Rovello Zaffuto, R; Vitellaro, A; Cumbo, G (1995). "The domain of the Lanza". Signori e corti nel cuore della Sicilia (in Italian). Caltanissetta: Fondazione culturale “Salvatore Sciascia”.
- Palizzolo Gravina, Vincenzo (1871). Dizionario storico-araldico della Sicilia (in Italian) (1972 reprint Forni Editore ed.). Visconti & Huber.
- Palizzolo Gravina V., Historical-heraldic dictionary of Sicily , II ed., Palermo, 1991, 227;
- Sinesio, Pasquale (1995). Trabia e i Lanza (in Italian). Caltanissetta (CL): Edizioni Lussografica. ISBN 9788882430221.Spreti, Vittorio (1931). Enciclopedia storico-nobiliare italiana (in Italian). Vol. IV (L–O) (1969 reprint ed.). Bologna: Libraria Editrice Forni. p. 49.
- Central State Archive. Directorate General for Archives. Servicio Araldico. Register of Royal Decree Transcriptions. Royal Decrees (personal appointments) 1.Letter of concession / titles of nobility of: Luigi Lanza and Branciforte, 9th prince of Trabia, etc .; 3 October 1855./ 1.1.-Letter of concession / noble titles of: Luigi Lanza Branciforte: 10th prince of Villafranca, 10th duke of the Sala di Paruta; 8 April 1876. 2. Grant letter / noble titles of: Cipriano Lanza and Branciforte, 10th prince of Trabia, etc .; May 6, 1896.
- State Archives Rome - Consulta Araldica- vol. XII fasc. 4578.
- Settia, Aldo G. (2004). "LANCIA (Lanza), Manfredi (Manfredo)". Dizionario biografico degli italiani. Vol. 63.
- Palizzolo Gravina, Vincenzo (1875). Il blasone in Sicilia: ossia, Raccolta araldica [Sicilian Coats of Arms: or, Heraldic Collection] (in Italian). Palermo: Visconti & Huber. p. 227.
- Ligresti, Domenico (1978). "Leonforte: a new country". Società di Storia Patria per la Sicilia Orientale (in Italian). 74 (1): 89–118.
