= Joanna of Austria, Marchioness of Militello =

Austrian princess (1573–1630)

Joanna of Austria
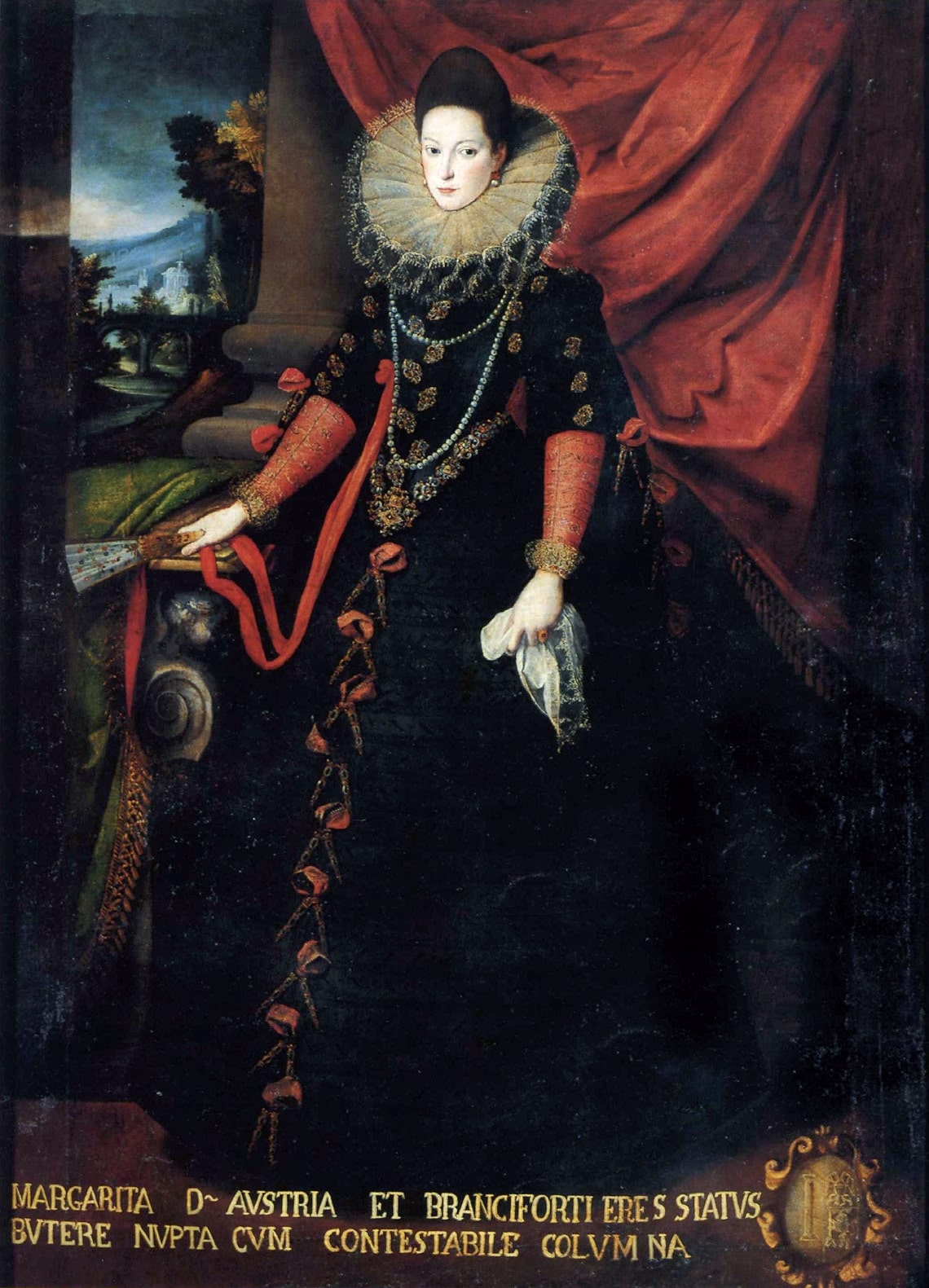
- Born: September 11, 1573; Naples, Kingdom of Naples
- Died: February 8, 1630 (aged 56); Naples, Kingdom of Naples
- Spouse: Francesco Branciforte (m. 1603; died 1622)
- Parents: John of Austria (father); Diana Falangola (mother)
- Family: Habsburg

Joanna of Austria (Italian: Giovanna d'Austria; September 11, 1573 – February 8, 1630) was the illegitimate daughter of John of Austria, the illegitimate son of Charles V, Holy Roman Emperor.

== Life ==
Joanna was born in 1573 to John of Austria, victorious admiral of the Battle of Lepanto of 1571, and the Sorrentine lady Diana Falangola. She was named after her aunt Joanna of Austria, a widowed princess of Portugal, who died a few days before her birth.

She was raised in Parma with her aunt Margaret of Austria, but when Margaret left to take over the government of the Netherlands in 1580, Philip II returned her to Naples. In Naples, she spent 10 years at the Royal Abbey of Santa Chiara. During these ten years, her education, initiated by Margaret of Austria, continued. In 1590 she wrote to her cousin Alexander Farnese to intercede with the king and grant her a change of residence. Consequently, the monarch sent her to the village of Pizzofalcone, a hunting village of the viceroy on the outskirts of Naples.

After the death of Philip II in 1598, her luck did not change and the Duke of Lerma ordered the viceroy of Naples, Fernando Ruiz de Castro Andrade and Portugal to continue the regime established until then. Finally in 1602 Joanna wrote a letter to Philip III in which she begged him for economic independence that would allow her to not depend on the viceroy of Naples. The monarch acceded to the request and indicated an income of 3,000 ducats and a dowry of 60,000. With this dowry, she married Sicilian nobleman Francesco Branciforte on 14 June 1603, to whom, on the occasion of such a high dowry, her parents gave the titles of Prince of Pietraperzia and Marquis of Militello. The marriage took place in the Royal Palace of Naples and included various feasts among which a carousel was held. They had three daughters, of which only one, Margherita Branciforte of Austria, lived to adulthood.

She founded the Church of Santa Maria della Vittoria in Naples and donated it, together with its convent, to the Theatine Fathers.

Joanna was widowed in 1622 and died in 1630.
