= Francesco Branciforte, 4th Prince of Butera =

Italian aristocrat and patron of the arts and sciences

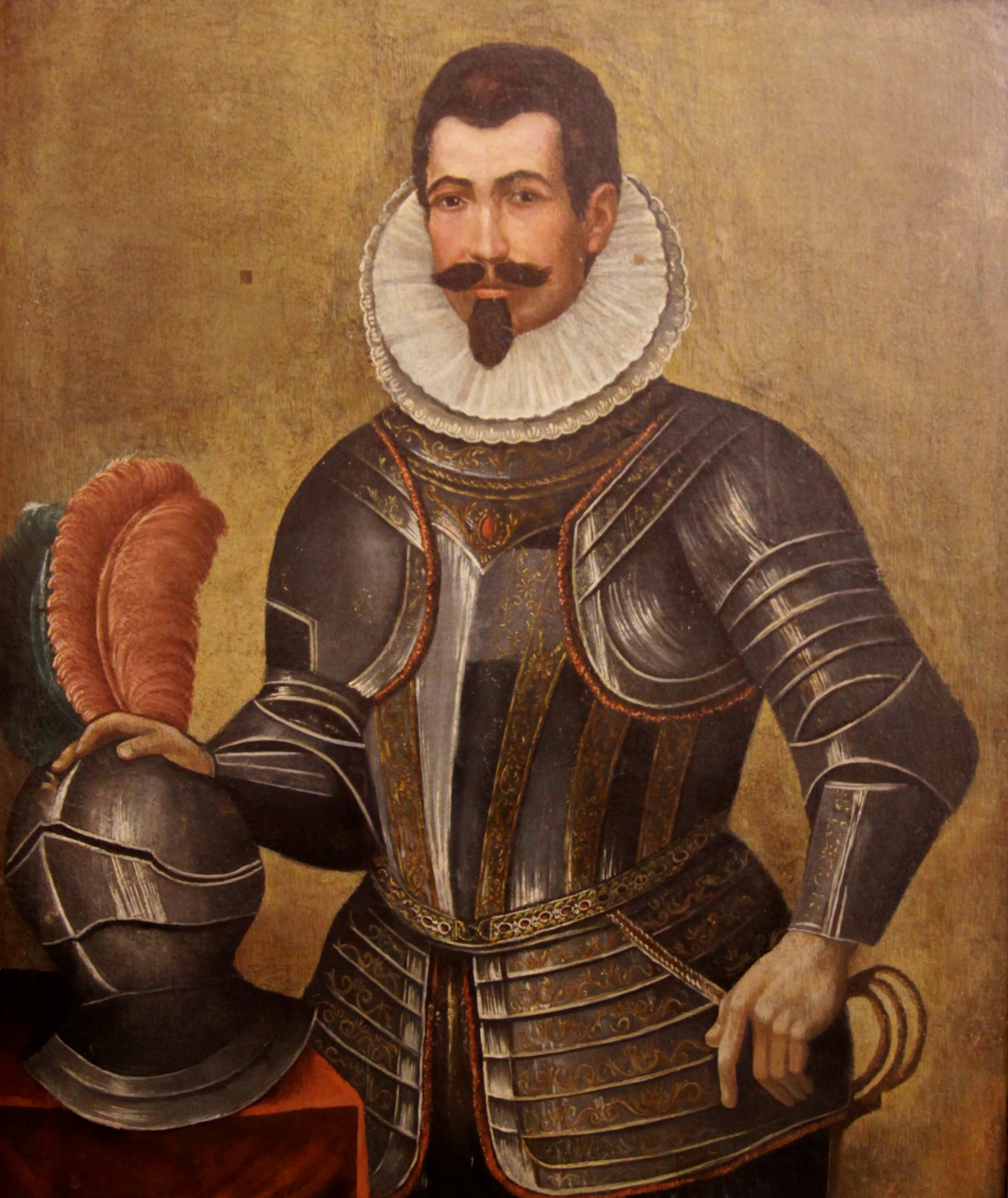

Francesco Branciforte Barresi (15 March 1575 – 23 February 1622) was an aristocrat, Marquess of Militello and 4th Prince of Butera, as well as a notable patron of the arts and sciences in Sicily.

== Early life ==
He was born in Militello in Val di Catania, the eldest son of Fabrizio Branciforte, 3rd Prince of Butera and Caterina Barresi Branciforte, Marchioness of Militello. He was raised in Spain, in the household of his paternal grandmother Dorotea Barresi Santapau, who was married to the Prince of Pietraperzia.

== Career ==
In 1605, Francesco inherited the title of Marchese di Militello. Francesco spent much of his life in Militello where he patronized a variety of prominent writers and artists, including Pietro Carrera, Filippo Caruso, and Mario Tortelli; the jurist Mario Gastone; the sculptor Giambattista Baldanza; and the painters Filippo Paladini and Mario Minniti. He founded a library and a printing house in town, and founded a Dominican monastery and the Abbey of St Benedict.

In 1622, he traveled to Messina to meet the newly appointed Spanish Viceroy, Emanuel Philibert of Savoy. In Messina he fell gravely ill and died.

== Personal life ==
While in Militello, he married Joanna of Austria (1573–1630), the illegitimate daughter of John of Austria, himself the illegitimate son of Charles V, Holy Roman Emperor. Together, they were the parents of five daughters, only one living to adulthood:

- Margherita Branciforte (1604–1659), who married Federico Colonna (1601–1641), but her only offspring died in infancy.

Francesco died in Messina on 23 February 1622 and was buried in Militello.
