= Licodia Eubea =

Licodia Eubea Licuddìa (Sicilian)
- Comune
- Comune di Licodia Eubea
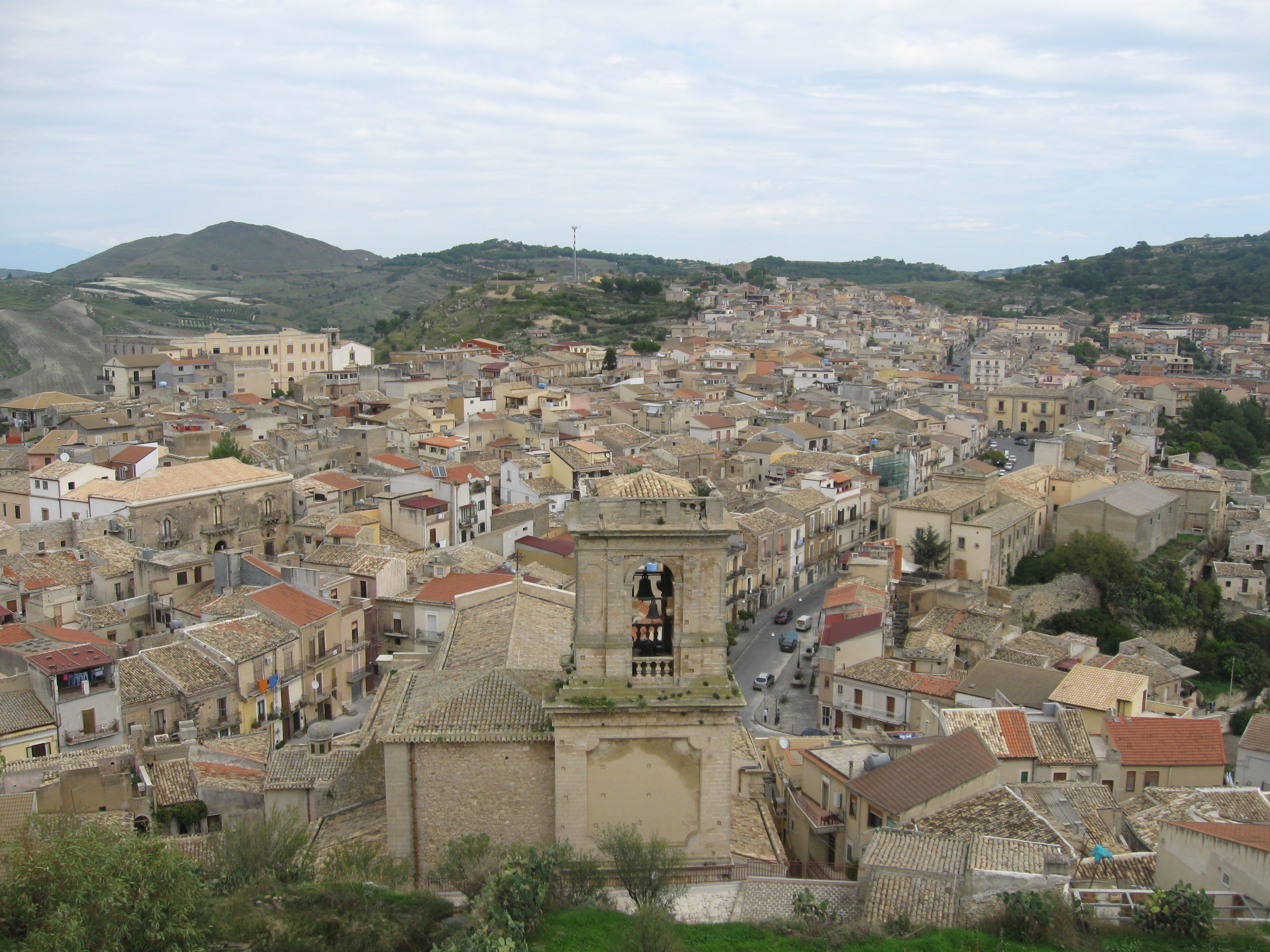
- View of Licodia Eubea.

- Coat of arms

- Location within Italy Location within Sicily
- Coordinates: 37°09′N 14°42′E
- Country: Italy
- Region: Sicily
- Metropolitan city: Catania (CT)

Government
  - Mayor: Giovanni Verga

Area
  - Total: 111 km^{2} (43 sq mi)
- Elevation: 688 m (2,257 ft)

Population (30 September 2017)
  - Total: 3,082
  - Density: 27.8/km^{2} (71.9/sq mi)
- Demonym: Licodiani
- Time zone: UTC+1 (CET)
  - Summer (DST): UTC+2 (CEST)
- Postal code: 95040
- Dialing code: 0933
- Patron saint: St. Margaret
- Saint day: 20 July
- Website: www.comune.licodiaeubea.ct-egov.it

Licodia Eubea (Sicilian: Licuddìa; Ancient Greek: Lykodía Evía) is a town and comune in the Metropolitan City of Catania, on the island of Sicily, southern Italy. It is bounded by the comuni of Caltagirone, Chiaramonte Gulfi, Giarratana, Grammichele, Mazzarrone, Mineo, Monterosso Almo and Vizzini. It rises over an internal hilly area, 630 metres (2,070 ft) above sea level.

The town is located above a hill overlooking the valley of the Dirillo river.

Among the notable buildings in the town are Santa Margherita, the mother church of the town, erected during the 17th century, preserving the emblem of the Santapau family on its front portal, the Chiesa del Rosario of the 18th century, and the Palazzo Municipale (Town Hall building).

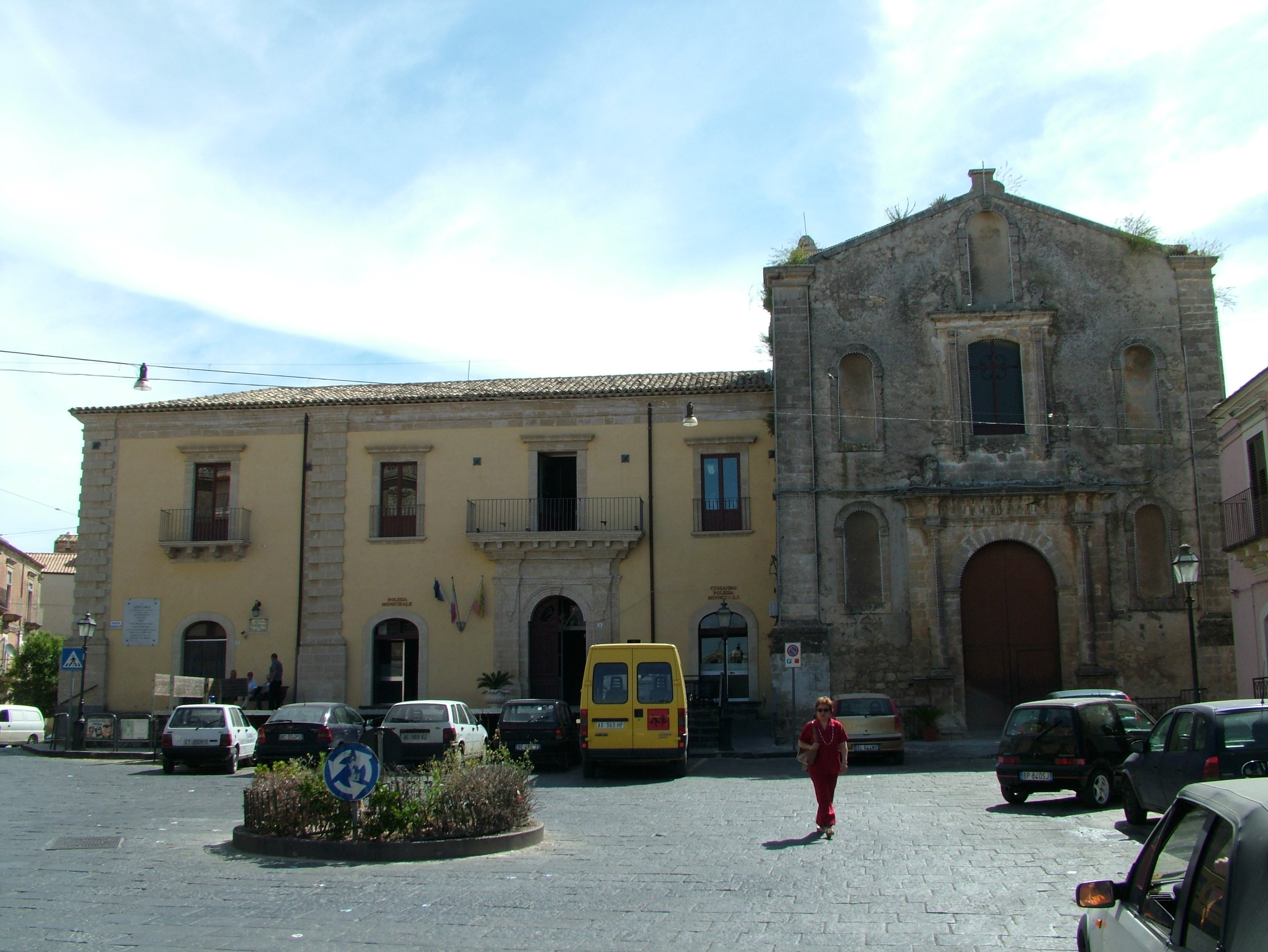
Town Hall and Church of the Rosary.

== History ==
The name Licodia derives from the Greek word 'Licos' meaning wolf, which is why its Coat-of-Arms has a picture of a wolf. The suburb belonged to lord Riccardo Filangieri, and was afterwards bestowed to nobleman Manfredi Aragona.

The name Eubea was given to the place in 1872, to identify with Chalcis, a town on Euboea, the second-largest Greek island, because it is believed to be the colony of Leontini, founded early in the 6th century BC on the same site of an unknown Sicel settlement. Vases of the First Period were found and all the tombs explored in 1898 belonged to the Fourth Period (700–500 BCE), and show the gradual process of Hellenization among the Sicels.

In 1392, the ancient castle was bestowed to the Santapau family, that gave it its name and owned it until the 16th century, when it passed under the dominion of lord Vincenzo Ruffo. In 1693, the town was devastated by the earthquake, and experienced a slow reconstruction.

In 1968, the Licodia Eubea Social Club was established in Victoria, Australia.

== Twin towns ==
- Santa Pau, Spain
- Euboea, island in Greece
