= Pietraperzia =

Pietraperzia Petrapirzia (Sicilian)
- Comune
- Comune di Pietraperzia
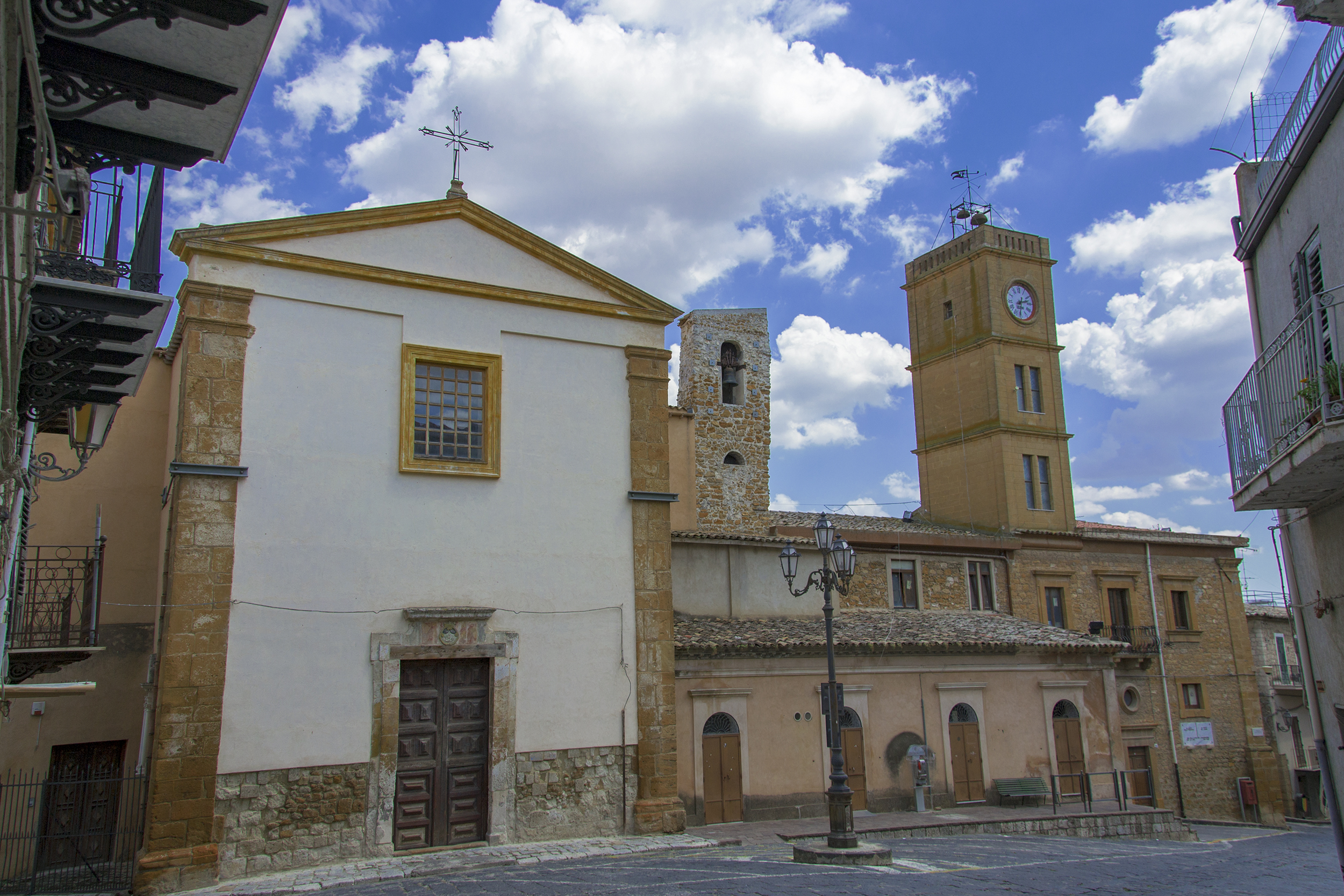
- Palazzo Comunale

- Location within Italy Location within Sicily
- Coordinates: 37°24′N 14°8′E
- Country: Italy
- Region: Sicily
- Province: Enna (EN)

Government
  - Mayor: Antonio Calogero Bevilacqua

Area
  - Total: 118.11 km^{2} (45.60 sq mi)
- Elevation: 476 m (1,562 ft)

Population (2026)
  - Total: 6,183
  - Density: 52.35/km^{2} (135.6/sq mi)
- Demonym: Pietrini
- Time zone: UTC+1 (CET)
  - Summer (DST): UTC+2 (CEST)
- Postal code: 94016
- Dialing code: 0934
- Patron saint: Saint Roch
- Website: Official website

Pietraperzia (Sicilian: Petrapirzia) is a town and comune (municipality) in the province of Enna in the autonomous island region of Sicily in southern Italy, located about 20 kilometres (12 mi) southwest of Enna and 100 kilometres (62 mi) southeast of Palermo. It has 6,183 inhabitants.

Pietraperzia borders the municipalities of Barrafranca, Caltanissetta, Enna, Mazzarino, Piazza Armerina, and Riesi.

== Demographics ==
As of 2026, the population is 6,183, of which 47.7% are males, and 52.3% are females. Minors make up 15.1% of the population, and seniors make up 26.9%.

Historical population

Year	Pop.	±%
1861	10,607	—
1871	10,106	−4.7%
1881	11,312	+11.9%
1901	13,025	+15.1%
1911	12,190	−6.4%
1921	12,164	−0.2%
1931	12,564	+3.3%
1936	12,753	+1.5%

Year	Pop.	±%
1951	13,886	+8.9%
1961	13,226	−4.8%
1971	11,026	−16.6%
1981	10,996	−0.3%
1991	8,015	−27.1%
2001	7,340	−8.4%
2011	7,227	−1.5%
2021	6,387	−11.6%

Source: ISTAT

=== Immigration ===
As of 2025, immigrants make up 5.9% of the population. The 5 largest foreign countries of birth are Germany, Switzerland, Romania, Belgium, and France.

== Notable people ==
- Elvira Mancuso (1867–1958), writer, born in and died in Petrapirzia
- Vincenzo Aurelio Guarnaccia (1899–1954), poet and translator
