= Lazzaro =

Lazzaro is both a masculine Italian given name and a surname. Notable people with the name include:

== Given name ==
- Lazzaro Baldi (c. 1624 – 1703), Italian Baroque painter
- Lazzaro Bastiani (1429–1512), Italian Renaissance painter
- Lazzaro Calamech, 16th-century Italian painter and sculptor
- Lazzaro Calvi (1512–1587), Italian Renaissance painter
- Lazzaro Cattaneo (1560–1640), Italian Jesuit missionary
- Lazzaro Donati (1926–1977), Italian painter
- Lazzaro Mongiardini, Italian mathematician
- Lazzaro Morelli (1619–1690), Italian Baroque sculptor
- Lazzaro Pasini (1861–1949), Italian painter
- Lazzaro Spallanzani (1729–1799), Italian Roman Catholic priest, biologist and physiologist
- Lazzaro Vasari (1399–1468), Italian painter

== Surname ==
- Anthony Lazzaro (disambiguation), multiple people
- Carol Lazzaro-Weis (1949–2022), American professor of Italian and French
- Eva Lazzaro (born 1995), Australian actress
- Leandro Lázzaro (born 1974), Argentine footballer
- Marc Lazzaro (born 1955), French swimmer
- Urbano Lazzaro (1924–2006), Italian resistance fighter
- Sofia Lazzaro (born 1934) early stage name of Sofia Loren from 1950-1953

== See also ==
- Di Lazzaro, Italian surname
- 3602 Lazzaro, a main-belt asteroid
- Happy as Lazzaro, a 2018 Italian film
