= Pennsylvania House of Representatives, District 193 =

American legislative district

Pennsylvania's 193rd State House of Representatives district
Representative
Catherine Wallen; R–York Springs

The 193rd Pennsylvania House of Representatives District is located in Adams County and Cumberland County and includes the following areas:

- Adams County (PART):
  - Berwick Township
  - Butler Township
  - Hamilton Township
  - Huntington Township
  - Latimore Township
  - Menallen Township
  - Oxford Township
  - Reading Township
  - Tyrone Township
  - Abbottstown
  - Arendtsville
  - Bendersville
  - Biglerville
  - East Berlin
  - New Oxford
  - York Springs
- Cumberland County (PART):
  - Cooke Township
  - Dickinson Township
  - Penn Township
  - Shippensburg Township
  - South Newton Township
  - Southampton Township
  - Shippensburg (Cumberland County portion)

== Representatives ==
Representative	Party	Years	District home	Note
Prior to 1969, seats were apportioned by county.
Sarah A. Anderson	Democrat	1969 – 1972		
District moved from Philadelphia County to Adams & York Counties after 1982, adjusted to Adams & Cumberland Counties after 2014
Donald W. Dorr	Republican	1973 – 1990		
Steven R. Nickol	Republican	1991 – 2008		
Will Tallman	Republican	2009 – 2018		
Torren Ecker	Republican	2019 – 2025		
Catherine Wallen	Republican	2026 – present	York Springs	Elected to fill vacancy

== Recent election results ==
PA House election, 2024: Pennsylvania House, District 193
Party	Candidate	Votes	%
Republican	Torren Ecker (incumbent)	Unopposed	
Total votes		28,805	100
Republican hold			
