= William Talman =

William Talman may refer to:

- William Talman (actor) (1915–1968), American actor
- William Talman (architect) (1650–1719), English architect

== See also ==
- Will Tallman, U.S. Representative
