= Torren Ecker =

American politician

Member of the Pennsylvania House of Representatives from the 193rd district
- In office January 1, 2019 – December 30, 2025
- Preceded by: Will Tallman
- Succeeded by: Catherine Wallen

Personal details
- Born: September 2, 1985 (age 41)
- Party: Republican
- Spouse: Laura Ecker
- Education: George Mason University, (BA); Western Michigan University, (JD)
- Profession: Attorney
- Website: www.repecker.com

Torren C. Ecker (born September 2, 1985) is a Pennsylvania politician and the former representative for the 193rd District in the Pennsylvania House of Representatives.

== Career ==
Torren Ecker is an attorney at a Hanover-based law firm. He also works with the East Berlin Community Center, the Hanover Chamber of Commerce, and the Rotary Club. Ecker worked as a legislative aid to Republican Congresswoman Jo Ann Davis in Virginia's 1st congressional district.

== Political career ==
Ecker is a self-described conservative, and, in the early stages of his first campaign, promised to bring his "fiscal responsibility to Harrisburg to protect the hardworking families of the district." He has stated that he is a supporter of Second Amendment rights, but believes that these rights can be balanced when addressing issues like school safety.

Ecker supports pro-life policies. In the 2021-2022 Regular Season, Ecker co-sponsored a proposed amendment to the Pennsylvania Constitution that there is no right to an abortion or the funding of an abortion. In the past, Ecker has been endorsed by the PA Pro-Life Federation PAC.

Ecker has stated that the school funding formula in Pennsylvania is inequitable and should be changed, and that the Commonwealth needs to increase funding for vocational programs and apprenticeships as a means of workforce development. He has also suggested that the public schoolteacher pension system needs to be reformed.

In 2018, Ecker campaigned on stopping Tom Wolf's "Liberal Agenda" and "Massive Tax Increases," but expressed gratitude that the Governor has supported increasing funding for apprenticeship programs.

In the 2019-2020 Legislative session, Ecker was placed on the Children and Youth, Game and Fisheries, Labor and Industry, Veteran Affairs and Emergency Preparedness, and Judiciary committees.

During the 2019 Coronavirus pandemic, Ecker voted in favor of a bill that would terminate Governor Wolf's declaration of emergency, which served as the legal authority for much of the official response to the pandemic. In a post on his official Facebook page, Ecker noted that "Pennsylvania will remain under the federal emergency declaration and CDC safety guidance would still apply," while cautioning "that nothing legally will change until the court rules or the governor follows the direction of the Legislature and cancels his emergency declaration."

Ecker did not co-sponsor a resolution from Daryl Metcalfe that would have initiated impeachment proceedings against Governor Wolf for his response to the Coronavirus pandemic.

In May 2023, Ecker was charged with a DUI following a single-vehicle crash in Adams County on April 19. He subsequently had his license suspended and was ordered to complete a nine-month ARD (Accelerated Rehabilitative Disposition) program.

In January 2025, Rep. Ecker announced his candidacy for Adams County Court of Common Pleas for the May 20, 2025, primary. After winning the election he resigned from the Pennsylvania House in December 2025 to assume the position.

== Electoral history ==
=== 2018 ===
After Will Tallman announced he would not run for re-election in 2018, four candidates entered the Republican Primary in the 193rd District. Torren Ecker won the May 15th Primary by a one-vote margin over Barry Cockley, John Wardle, and Andrew Myers, receiving a total of 1,784 votes; initially, results indicated that Cockley had won by one vote, but a provisional ballot and absentee ballot that were originally uncounted were included in the final tally in favor of Ecker.

Pennsylvania House of Representatives, District 193 Republican Primary, 2018
Party	Candidate	Votes	%
Republican	Torren Ecker	1,784	27.4%
Republican	Vincent Barry Cockley	1,783	27.4%
Republican	John Wardle	1,537	23.6%
Republican	Andrew Myers	1,404	21.6%

In the 2018 Election, receiving just over two-thirds of the vote, Ecker defeated his Democratic opponent Matt Nelson.

Pennsylvania House of Representatives election in 2018
Party	Candidate	Votes	%
Republican	Torren Ecker	16,376	67.9%
Democratic	Matt Nelson	7,727	32.1%

Ecker won re-election to another term in the Pennsylvania House of Representatives on November 3, 2020.

== Personal life ==
Ecker lives just outside of Hanover, Pennsylvania with his wife Laura, a special education teacher, and his two children, Addy and Oliver. He is a graduate of Spring Grove Area High School, George Mason University, and the Thomas M. Cooley Law School at Western Michigan University.

On April 18, 2023, the Pennsylvania State Police reported that Ecker had crashed his car into a guide rail in Huntington Township, and that alcohol was a factor. Ecker was not injured.
