= Andrea Calamech =

Italian architect and sculptor (1524-1589)

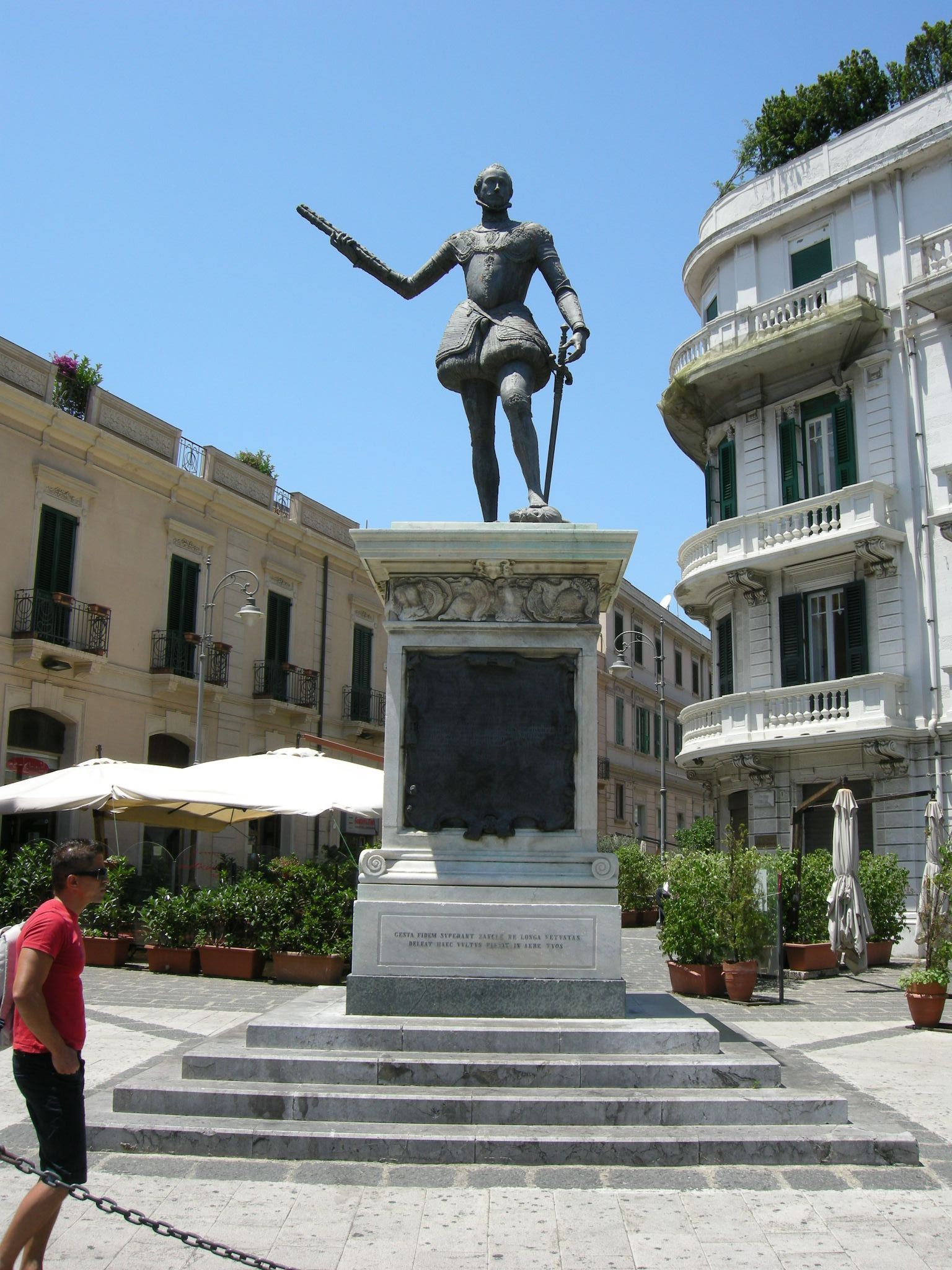
Calamech's statue of John of Austria in Messina (1572)

Andrea Calamech (1524 – 1589) was an Italian sculptor and architect.

== Life ==
Born in Carrara, he became a student and studio assistant of Bartolomeo Ammannati, who was himself heavily influenced by Michelangelo. For the first part of his life he worked as a sculptor in Tuscany, collaborating with Ammannati on the Fountain of Neptune in Florence. He was summoned to Messina in 1563 to oversee works on Messina Cathedral.

After a short spell back in Florence (where he was one of the designers of the apparatus for Michelangelo's funeral ceremonies in 1564) and Carrara, he returned to Messina, where in 1567 he was made chief architect, city planner and sculptor to the city council, a role he fulfilled for over twenty years. He founded a Florentine art school in the city along with a dynasty of artists, working in Messina with his son Francesco and various relations such as his nephew Lazzaro Calamech and his son-in-law Rinaldo Bonanno. He died in Messina and is buried there in the church of Santa Maria dell'Idria.

== Works ==
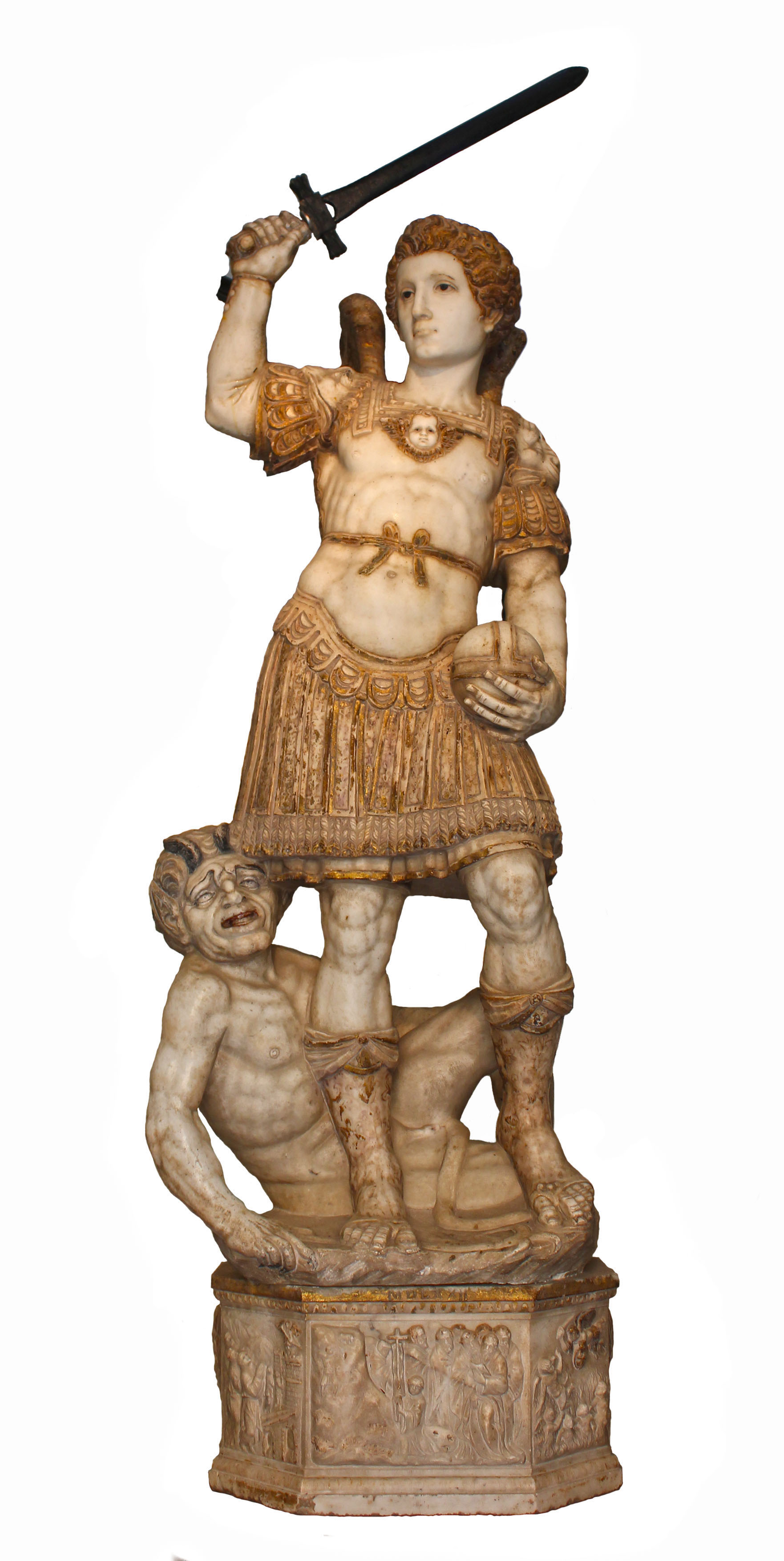
Saint Michael (1572), castle chapel, Santa Lucia del Mela

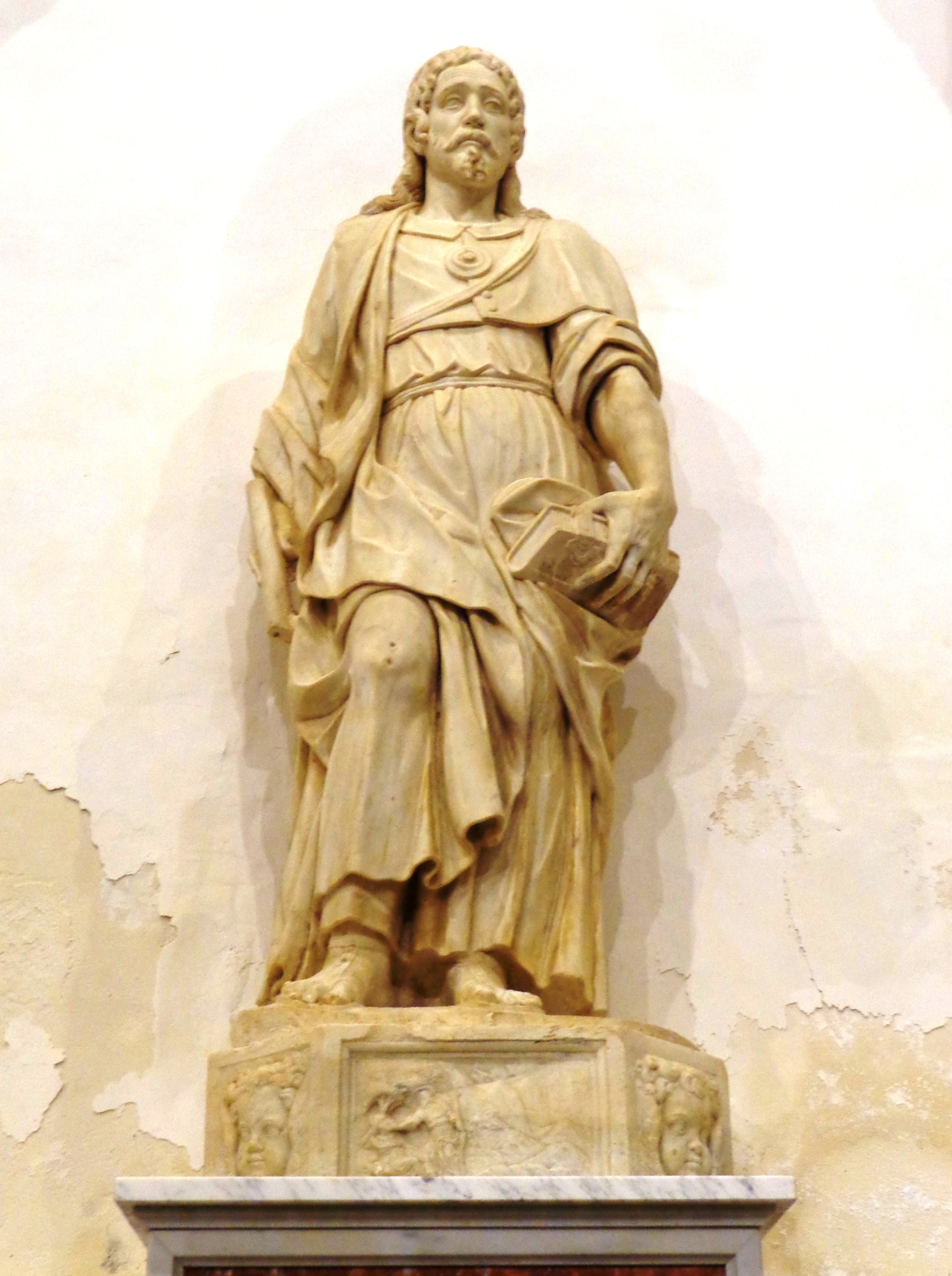
Saint James, Duomo di Castroreale

Many of his works in Messina were lost in the 1908 earthquake. The only complete surviving work by him is the Mannerist 1572 bronze monument to Don John of Austria in the piazza in front of Santissima Annunziata dei Catalani church.

His main work was the various works sculpted for Messina Cathedral - traces of them survive marked by his Mannerism embellished with classical forms. He also produced several fountains and statues of saints and of the Madonna and Child for churches in the city and province of Messina.

=== Province of Calabria ===
All 16th century:

- Charles V's Triumphal Entry into Seminara, Battle of Figurella and Coat of Arms of the Catholic Kings (recorded in Seminara - the third of the works was commissioned by Gonzalo Fernández de Córdoba)

== Bibliography ==
- (in Italian) Dizionario biografico degli italiani, XVI, Roma, Istituto dell'Enciclopedia italiana, 1973
- (in Italian) Giuseppe Grosso Cacopardo, "Guida per la città di Messina", Messina, Giuseppe Fiumara, 1841.
