= Huntington Township, Pennsylvania =

Huntington Township is the name of some places in the U.S. state of Pennsylvania:

- Huntington Township, Adams County, Pennsylvania
- Huntington Township, Luzerne County, Pennsylvania
