= Albert Cook Myers =

American historian (1874–1960)

- Born: December 12, 1874; York Springs, Pennsylvania, US
- Died: April 1, 1960 (aged 85); West Chester, Pennsylvania, US
- Education: Swarthmore College (BLitt, MLitt)
- Occupation: Historian

Albert Cook Myers (December 12, 1874 – April 1, 1960) was an American author, genealogist, and historian of Quakers and Pennsylvania. He was a leading authority on the life and works of William Penn, a Quaker leader and founder of the Province of Pennsylvania during the British colonial era.

== Early life and education ==
Myers was born in York Springs, Pennsylvania, the first child of Sarah Ann (née Cook) and John T. Myers. His mother taught school before her marriage, while his father sold farm equipment and real estate. At the age of 18, his mother reportedly shook Abraham Lincoln's hand after he delivered the Gettysburg Address. As adults, one of his sisters taught at the Friends Select School, the second was a social worker, and the third was a housewife.

Myers attended Adams County public schools and graduated from Martin Academy in Kennett Square, Pennsylvania, in 1894. He received his Bachelor of Letters in 1898 and his Master of Letters in 1901, both from Swarthmore College. In 1932, Franklin & Marshall College awarded him an honorary Doctor of Letters. He took graduate coursework in history at the University of Pennsylvania, the University of Wisconsin, and Harvard University.

== Public history career ==
Myers worked as registrar, instructor, and secretary to the president at Swarthmore from 1900 to 1902. He edited The Literary Era from 1898 to 1900.

Myers became a prominent figure in Pennsylvania public history. He served as a director of the Pennsylvania Historical Exhibit and of the Historical Exhibits of the Thirteen Original States for the Jamestown Exposition in 1907. He served on the Philadelphia Mayor's Historical Committee to organize celebrations of the city's founding and directed the Historic Industries Loan Exhibit of the Founders Celebration. As a member of the Philadelphia War Service Committee during World War I, he entertained a total of 32,000 servicemen by organizing historical tours of Philadelphia, arranging meals and receptions at the Historical Society of Pennsylvania, and distributing pamphlets about the city's history. In 1924–25, he raised funds to purchase William Penn's royal charter and bring it back to Pennsylvania; he also organized the 1925 welcome celebration. In 1928, he directed a celebration of the 150th anniversary of the French alliance with America and in 1932 directed a celebration of the 250th anniversary of the first arrival of Penn in America.

From 1924 to 1936, Myers served on the board of the Valley Forge Park Commission, which expanded the future Valley Forge National Historical Park. In 1924–27 and 1933–36, he served as secretary of the Pennsylvania State Historical Commission. He ramped up the state's historical marker program, installing scores of markers and also contributing to the restoration of Pennsbury Manor. He served on the board of directors of the Friends Historical Association from 1921 to 1925 and again from 1927 to 1936. He also served as president of the Pennsylvania Federation of Historical Societies.

In 2011, Myers was posthumously elected to membership in the National Genealogy Hall of Fame, run by the National Genealogical Society.

== Personal life and death ==
Myers was a lifelong Hicksite Quaker. He never married or fathered children. He lived at his parents' house in Moylan from 1906 to 1955, when he sold the house and moved to West Chester and then to the Pocopson Home assisted living facility. He died in West Chester on April 1, 1960, at the age of 85. He was interred at the cemetery of the Providence Friends Meetinghouse, where he had been a lifelong congregant, in Media, Pennsylvania.

== Research and publications ==
In 1910, Myers launched a lifelong project to research Penn's life and compile and edit the complete works of William Penn, which he intended to publish in 15 volumes. He spent years in England and Ireland tracking down Penn's letters. His research gained the support of the Royal Historical Society and the Friends Historical Society, which arranged to have him formally presented to King George V and access private collections across Britain and Ireland. Myers died without completing this work, but he did publish many books and articles on Pennsylvania and Quaker history, genealogy, and biography.

- Wharton, Walter (1955). Myers, Albert Cook (ed.). Land Survey Register, 1675–1679, West Side Delaware River, from Newcastle County, Delaware, into Bucks County, Pennsylvania. Wilmington: Delaware Historical Society.
- Myers, Albert Cook (1937). William Penn's Early Life in Brief, 1644–1674. Moylan, Pa.
- Penn, William (1937). Myers, Albert Cook (ed.). William Penn: His Own Account of the Lenni Lenape or Delaware Indians, 1683. Moylan, PA.
- Myers, Albert Cook (1932). "Robert Wade, the Earliest Quaker Settler on the West Side of the Delaware River, in 1676, and the First American Host of William Penn, in 1682". Bulletin of Friends Historical Association. 21 (2): 53–59. ISSN 0361-1957. JSTOR 41943902.
- Myers, Albert Cook (1932). The Boy George Washington, Aged 16: His Own Account of an Iroquois Indian Dance, 1748. Philadelphia.
- Myers, Albert Cook (1912). Narratives of Early Pennsylvania, West New Jersey and Delaware, 1630–1707. Original narratives of early American history. New York: Charles Scribner's Sons.
- Smith, John (1904). Myers, Albert Cook (ed.). Hannah Logan's Courtship, A True Narrative; The Wooing of the Daughter of James Logan, Colonial Governor of Pennsylvania, and Divers Other Matters, as Related in the Diary of her Lover, the Honorable John Smith, Assemblyman of Pennsylvania and King's Councillor of New Jersey, 1736–1752. Philadelphia: Ferris & Leach.
- Myers, Albert Cook (1902). Immigration of the Irish Quakers into Pennsylvania, 1682-1750: With Their Early History in Ireland. Swarthmore, PA.
- Wister, Sarah (1902). Albert Cook, Myers (ed.). Sally Wister's Journal, a True Narrative; Being a Quaker Maiden's Account of Her Experiences with Officers of the Continental Army, 1777–1778. Philadelphia: Ferris & Leach.

The University of Pennsylvania Press published Penn's papers in five volumes during the 1980s.

== Papers ==
Myers donated his papers to the Chester County History Center in 1955. Totaling 450 boxes, the collection includes transcriptions of marriages, land records and maps, diaries, cemetery and courthouse records, and other materials (including his academic gown). The collection featured one of nine known surviving daguerreotypes of Frederick Douglass. Douglass had gifted the photo to Susan B. Anthony, whose niece in turn gave it to Myers.
