= Ida Augusta Keller =

American plant physiologist

- Born: June 11, 1866; Darmstadt, Grand Duchy of Hesse
- Died: September 10, 1932 (aged 66); Bucks County, Pennsylvania, US
- Education: University of Zurich
- Scientific career
- Fields: Plant physiology
- Workplaces: Philadelphia High School for Girls
- Thesis: On Protoplasmic Flow in the Plant Kingdom (1890)
- Doctoral advisor: Arnold Dodel-Port
- Author abbrev. (botany): I.Keller

Ida Augusta Keller (June 11, 1866 – September 10, 1932) was an American plant physiologist and teacher in Philadelphia.

== Early life and family ==
Ida Keller was born in on June 11, 1866 to William Charles Christian and Maria Augusta (née Cramer) Keller in Darmstadt, Grand Duchy of Hesse, while her parents were visiting their former home. She grew up in Philadelphia, where her father was a physician, and was graduated from the Philadelphia High School for Girls in 1884.

She attended the University of Pennsylvania from 1884 to 1886; as the first woman to complete the two-year course in biology, she received a Certificate of Proficiency in Biology. (This institution did not grant degrees to women at the time.) After working as an assistant in the herbarium at Bryn Mawr College for a year, she attended the University of Leipzig for two years, studying chemistry with Friedrich Stohmann and plant physiology with Wilhelm Pfeffer. She did her doctoral work at the University of Zurich, studying with Arnold Dodel-Port (de). In 1890, on completion of her dissertation, titled Über Protoplasma-Strömung im Pflanzenreich (On Protoplasmic Flow in the Plant Kingdom), she received a PhD degree.

Ida had a brother, Harry Frederick Keller, who was educated as a chemist and also taught in Philadelphia public schools.

== Career ==
After receiving her doctorate, Ida Keller returned to Bryn Mawr as lecturer in botany for two years. In 1893, she became a teacher of chemistry at the Philadelphia High School for Girls, where she herself had attended. She became head of the chemistry and biology departments there in 1898. For 32 years, she continued to teach and chair a department until her retirement in 1930. She served as vice president of the Association of Colleges and Preparatory Schools of the Middle States in 1895. From 1911 to 1912, she was the first president of the Botanical Club of the Higher Schools of Philadelphia.

Keller's research interests included plant morphology and fertilization. She wrote several papers for the Proceedings of the Academy of Natural Sciences of Philadelphia, lab manuals for the high school, and a booklet on local insects. With Stewardson Brown (es), she published a flora of Philadelphia in 1905.

In 1890, Ida Keller became a member of the Academy of Natural Sciences of Philadelphia. She was elected to membership in the Philadelphia Botanical Club in 1892, being the first, and for many years the only, woman member. She was vice president of the club in 1900. Keller was an honorary member of the Pennsylvania Horticultural Society, a member of the American Association for the Advancement of Science, and a member of the American Eugenics Society. In a period when women were often excluded from professional societies, Keller was exceptional for her acceptance into the American Society of Naturalists.

In the years leading up to passage of the Nineteenth Amendment, Keller was active in the movement for women's suffrage, serving as vice president of a ward-level organization.

== Later life and death ==
Ida Keller died at her summer home in Aquetong, Bucks County, Pennsylvania, on 10 September 1932, at the age of 66. She was interred at Laurel Hill Cemetery in Philadelphia.

== Selected publications ==
- Keller, Ida A. (1890). Über Protoplasma-Strömung im Pflanzenreich. Zürich: Societäts-Buchdruckerei.
- Keller, Ida A.; Brown, Stewardson (1905). Handbook of the Flora of Philadelphia and Vicinity. Philadelphia, PA: Philadelphia Botanical Club.
- Keller, Ida A. (1910). Insects of Philadelphia and Vicinity, with Especial Reference to the More Common and Conspicuous Forms and Also to Those of Economic Importance. Philadelphia, PA.

== Bibliography ==
- Bailey, Martha J., ed. (1994), "Keller, Ida Augusta", American Women in Science: A Biographical Dictionary, Denver, CO: ABC-CLIO, pp. 191–192, ISBN 0-87436-740-9
- Creese, Mary R. S. (1998). Ladies in the Laboratory? American and British Women in Science, 1800-1900: A Survey of Their Contributions to Research. Lanham, MD: Scarecrow Press. ISBN 0-8108-3287-9.
- Harshberger, John William (1899). The Botanists of Philadelphia and Their Work. Philadelphia PA: Press of T. C. Davis & Sons. doi:10.5962/bhl.title.26947.
- Leonard, John William, ed. (1914), "Keller, Ida Augusta", Woman's Who's Who of America: A Biographical Dictionary of Contemporary Women of the United States and Canada, 1914-1915, New York, NY: The American Commonwealth Company, p. 448. Reprinted by Gale Research Company, Detroit, MI, 1976.
- Singer, Sandra L. (2003). Adventures Abroad: North American Women at German-Speaking Universities, 1868-1915. Westport, CT: Praeger Publishers. ISBN 0-313-32371-2. Contributions in Women's Studies, no. 201.
- Stone, Witmer (2 December 1932). "Ida Augusta Keller (1866-1932)". Bartonia (14): 59–60.
