= Pond Mill Bridge =

Historic arc bridge in Pennsylvania, US

- U.S. National Register of Historic Places
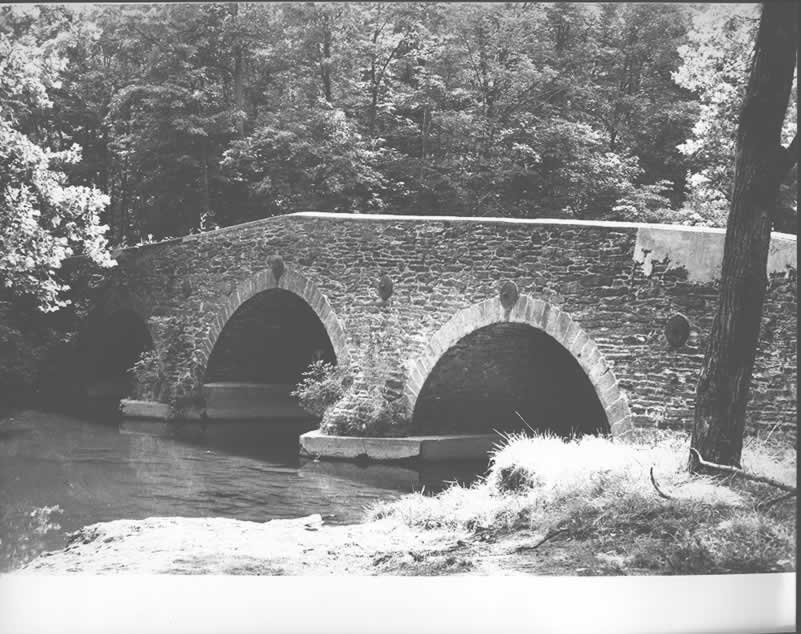
- Pond Mill Bridge, 1982

- Location within Pennsylvania Location within the United States
- Location: Legislative Route 01009 over Bermudian Creek, near Bermudian, Latimore Township, Pennsylvania
- Coordinates: 40.00153°N 77.0586°W
- Area: less than one acre
- Architectural style: Three-span camelback arch
- MPS: Highway Bridges Owned by the Commonwealth of Pennsylvania, Department of Transportation TR
- NRHP reference No.: 88000816
- Added to NRHP: June 22, 1988

Pond Mill Bridge, also known as Pondtown Mill Bridge, is a historic stone arch bridge in Latimore Township, Adams County, Pennsylvania, United States. It is a 91-foot-long (28 m), triple-arched rubble stone bridge. The bridge crosses Bermudian Creek.

It was added to the National Register of Historic Places in 1988.
