= Donald Dorr =

American politician

Donald W. Dorr

Member of the Pennsylvania House of Representatives from the 193rd district
- In office 1973–1990
- Preceded by: Sarah A. Anderson
- Succeeded by: Steven R. Nickol

Personal details
- Born: June 19, 1939 (age 87) Falls City, Nebraska
- Party: Republican

Donald W. Dorr (born 1939) is a former Republican member of the Pennsylvania House of Representatives.
