= Philadelphia High School for Girls =

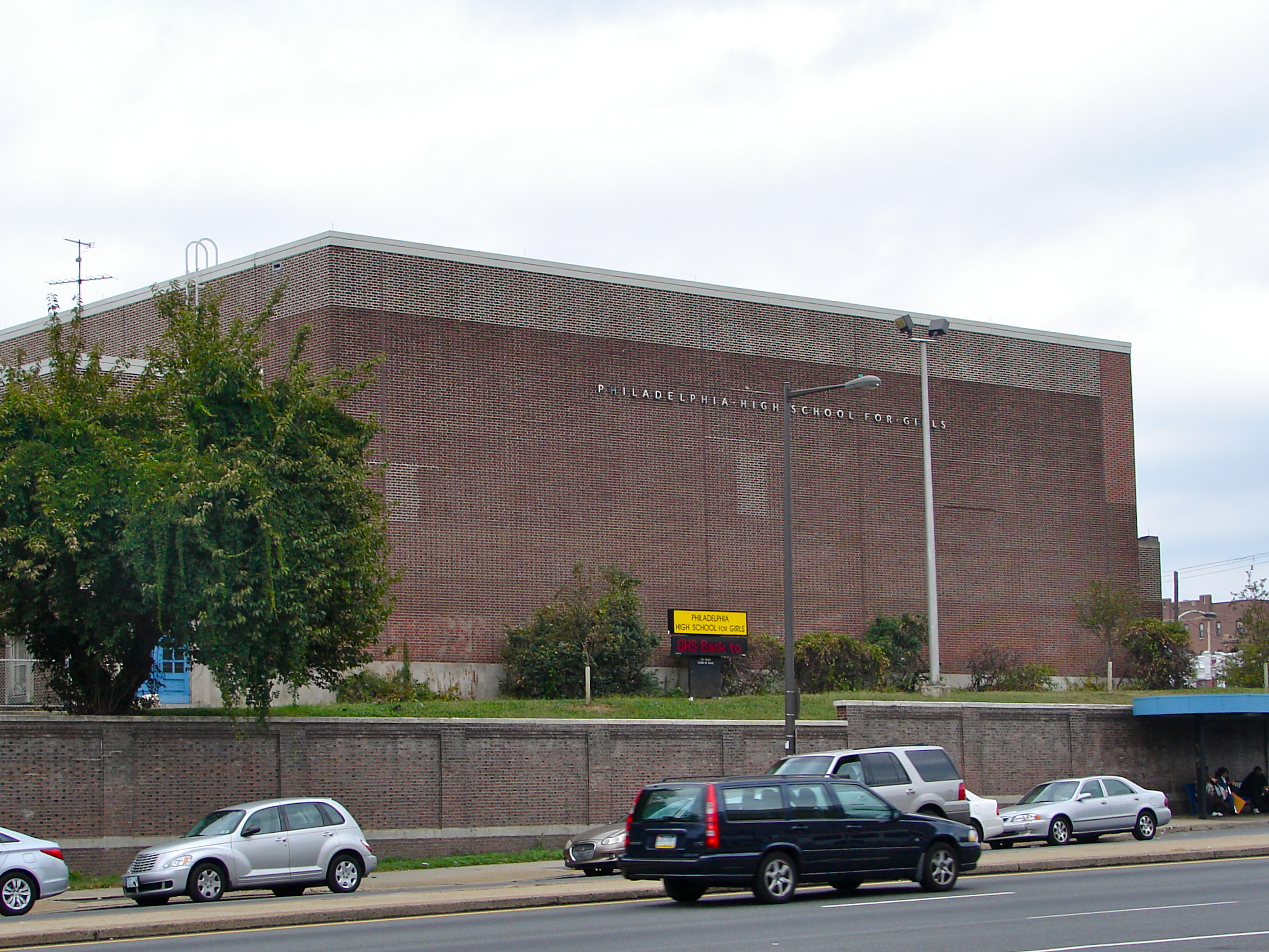

Location
- 1400 West Olney Avenue; Philadelphia, Pennsylvania 19141; United States
- 40°02′18″N 75°08′46″W

Information
- Former names: Girls' Normal School (1848–1854); Girls' High School of Philadelphia (1854–1860); Girls' High and Normal School (1860–1893)
- Type: Public college preparatory magnet school
- Motto: Vincit qui se vincit (He conquers who conquers himself)
- Established: 1848; 178 years ago
- School district: School District of Philadelphia
- Principal: KaTiedra Argro
- Staff: 46.00 (FTE)
- Grades: 9–12
- Enrollment: 894 (2022–23)
- Student to teacher ratio: 19.43
- Colors: White and yellow
- Mascot: Gazelle
- Website: girlshs.philasd.org

The Philadelphia High School for Girls, also known as Girls' High, is a public college preparatory magnet high school for girls in Philadelphia, Pennsylvania.

Established in 1848, it was one of the first public schools for women. It is a magnet school in the School District of Philadelphia with a competitive admissions process. Vincit qui se vincit (she conquers who conquers herself) is the school's motto. The school is located at Broad Street and Olney Avenue in the Logan section of Philadelphia.

== History ==
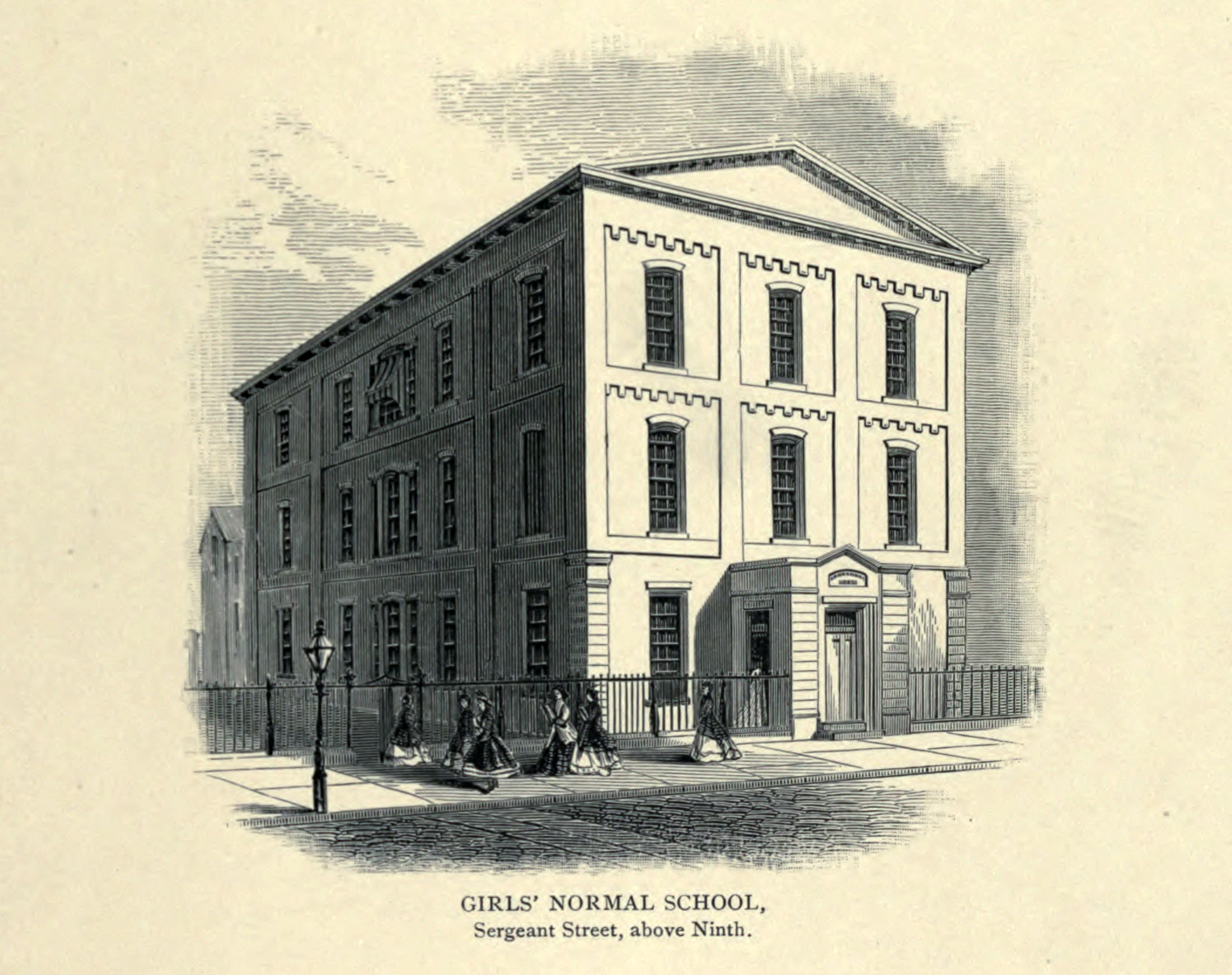
Girls Normal School, Sergeant St. above 9th, 1853

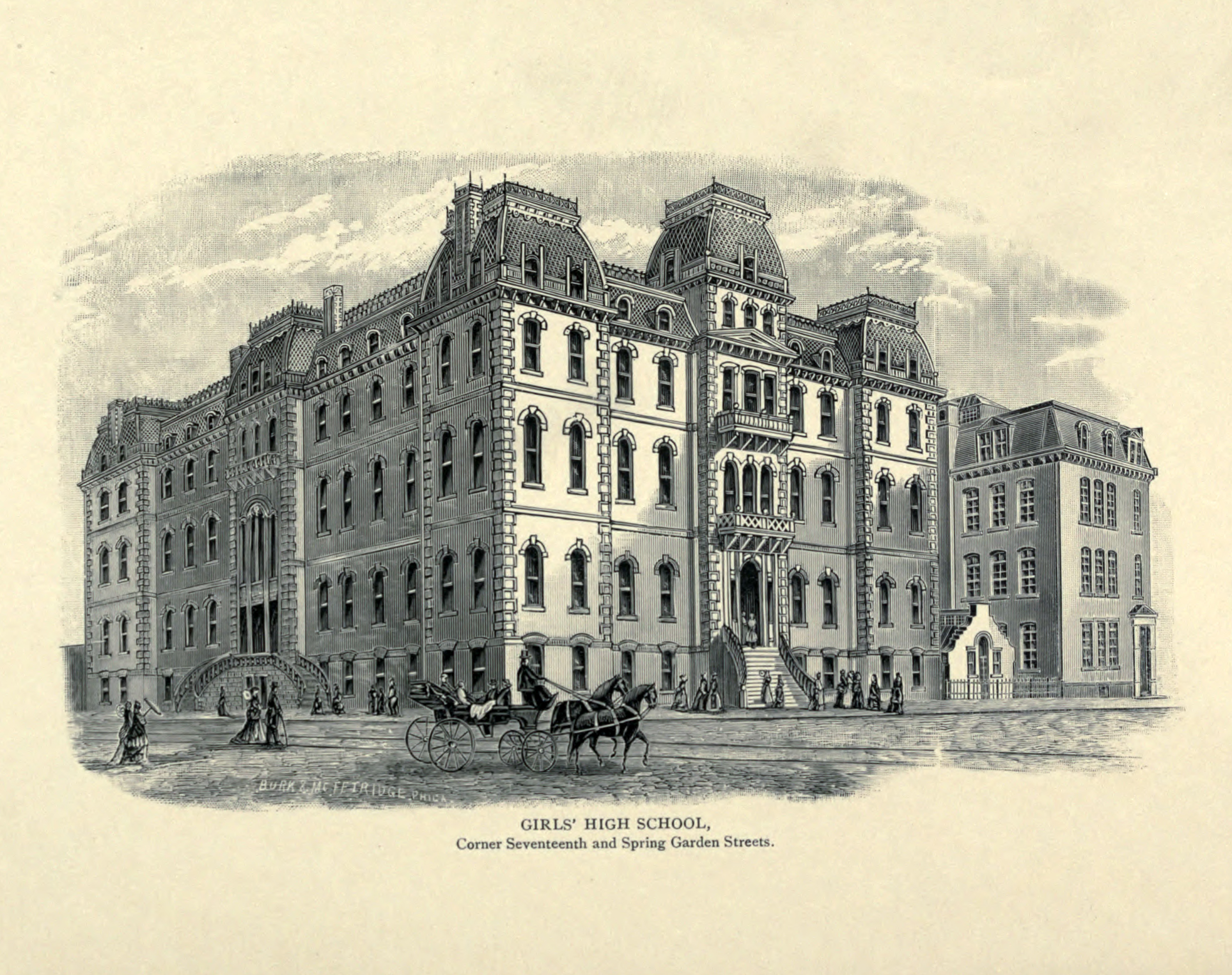
Girls High School, 17th and Spring Garden Sts., 1876

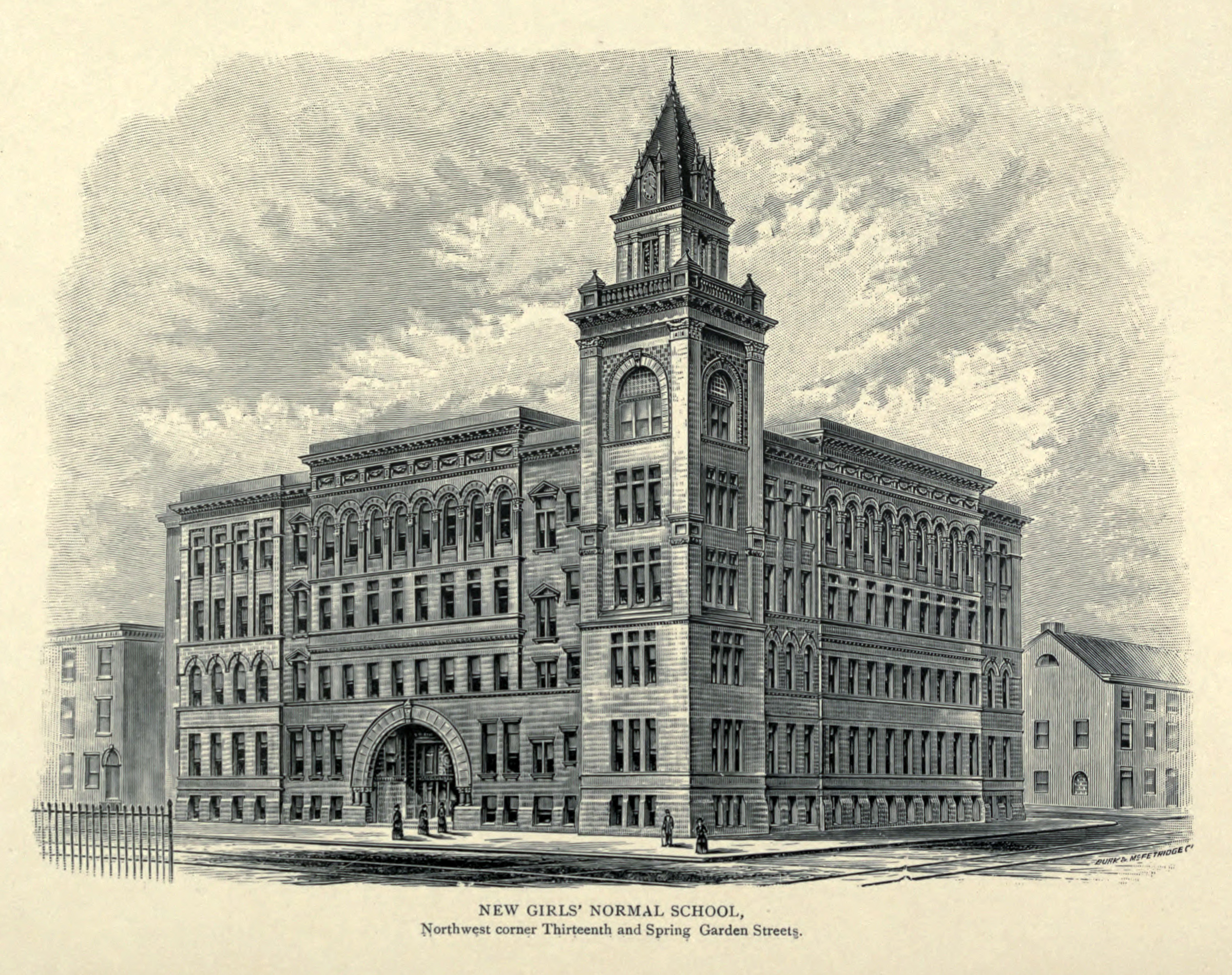
New Girls Normal School, 13th and Spring Garden Sts., 1893

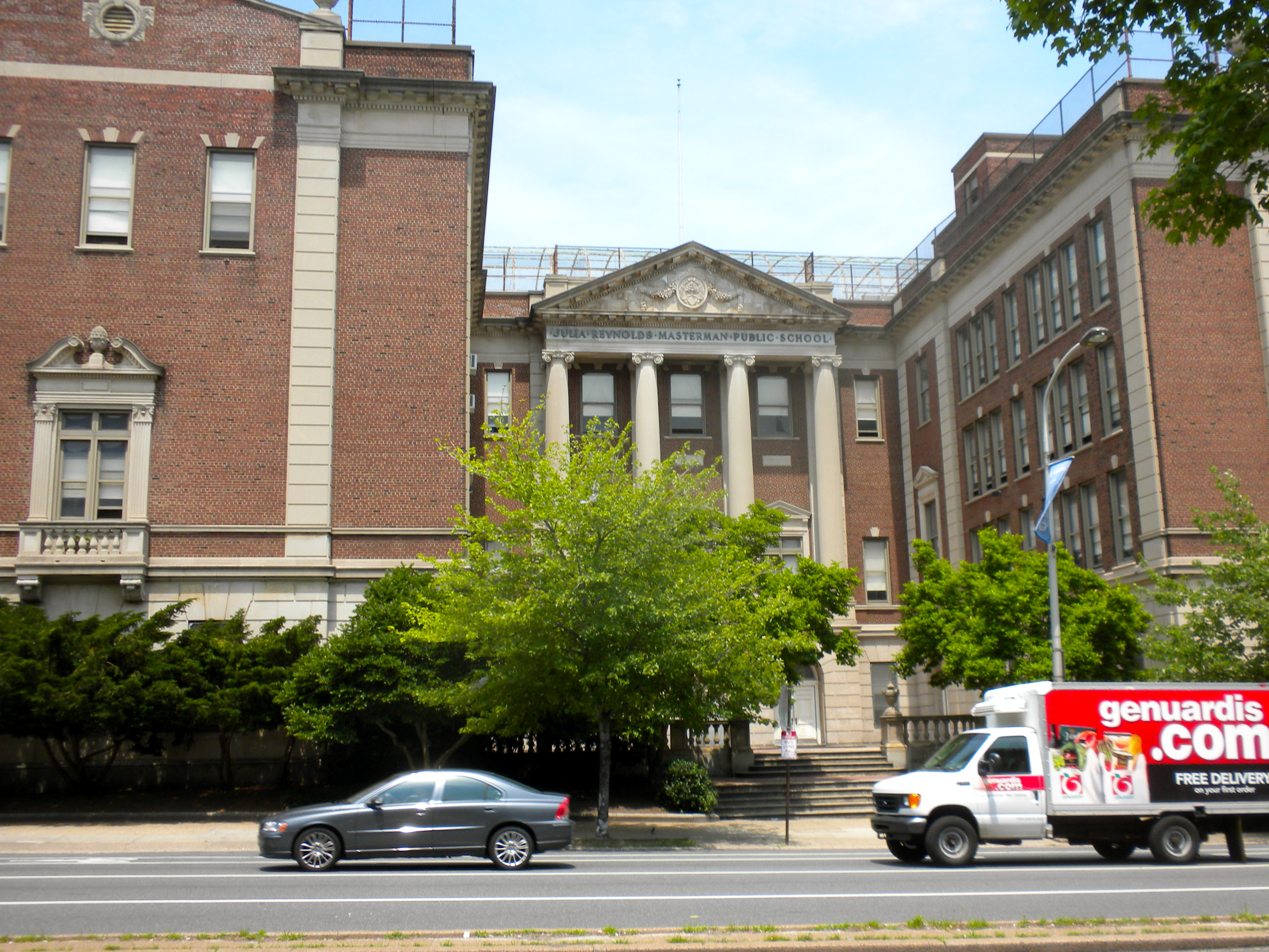
The previous Girls' High campus, now Julia R. Masterman School, which housed the school from 1933 to 1958

In 1848, the Girls' Normal School was established as the first secondary public school for women in Pennsylvania. It was also the first municipally supported teachers' school in the U.S. The first instructional session was held on February 1, 1848. By June 1848, there were 149 enrolled students, a large enrollment for a school at that time. The school continued to grow, forcing a move in 1854 to Sergeant Street between 9th and 10th Streets.

In April 1854, the name of the school was changed to the Girls' High School of Philadelphia. By June 1860, 65 graduates had received diplomas bearing the Girls' High School name. In 1860, the name of the school was again changed to The Girls' High and Normal School to better define the "design of the institution" as a school for an education confined to academic subjects and for future teachers.

In October 1876, a new school which "for convenience and comfort will probably have no superior" was constructed at Seventeenth and Spring Garden Streets. At the time, it was surpassed in size only by Girard College and the University of Pennsylvania.

In 1893, the High School and Normal School were separated into two distinct institutions. It was at this time that the institution became known as the Philadelphia High School for Girls. The school offered three parallel courses: a general course of three years with a possible postgraduate year, a classical course of four years, and a business course of three years. In 1898, a Latin-Scientific course "was designed to prepare students for the Women's Medical College, Cornell University, Vassar, Wellesley, Smith, Barnard, or such courses in the University of Pennsylvania as were open to women."

In the early 1930s, the school survived attempts to merge it with William Penn High School. Alumnae, faculty and friends of the school dedicated themselves to its preservation.

In 1933, a new school was erected at Seventeenth and Spring Garden Streets to replace the one which had stood on the site since 1876. This historic building, now the site of Julia R. Masterman School, was added to the National Register of Historic Places in 1976.

In May 1976, Vice Principal Dr. Florence Snite sued Katherine Day for libel because she had organized a demonstration protesting the administration's policy which barred lesbian alumnae from attending the prom.

In 1958, the school again outgrew its location and moved to its current site at Broad Street and Olney Avenue, near Central High School, which was an all-male school until 1983. Prior to Central turning co-educational, the two schools had a partnership.

== School song ==
The school song has two parts. "Alma Mater" was written by Grade Gordon (1906), with music by F. Edna Davis (1906). "Fidelitas" was written by Emily Loman in June 1915.

== School seals ==
Tree of Knowledge, Original School Seal

Nike of Samothrace or Winged Victory, School Seal

Tree of Knowledge, School Seal

== Notable alumnae ==
- Erika Alexander - actress and producer
- Gloria Allred - attorney
- Sarah A. Anderson - politician
- Leslie Esdaile Banks - novelist
- Deborah Batts - judge of the United States District Court for the Southern District of New York
- Becky Birtha - poet and author
- Susan Braudy - author, journalist and Pulitzer nominee
- Blondell Reynolds Brown - politician; only woman to serve as Philadelphia city councilmember at-large, 1999–2015
- Elaine Brown - first woman head of the Black Panther Party
- Vanessa Lowery Brown - Democratic member of the Pennsylvania House of Representatives who was convicted of bribery
- Bebe Moore Campbell - author
- Mary Schmidt Campbell - president of Spelman College
- Barbara Chase-Riboud - artist, sculptor, bestselling novelist and award-winning poet
- Constance Clayton - first woman and first African American superintendent of the School District of Philadelphia
- Mae Virginia Cowdery - poet
- Maria Donatucci - PA state representative of the 185th District; current PA chairwoman of Civil Service Committee (1972)
- Reed Erickson - philanthropist; transgender man who provided early support to the LGBT movement
- Jessie Redmon Fauset - Harlem Renaissance novelist; editor of The Crisis
- Eileen Folson - Grammy-nominated musician, Broadway composer (1974)
- Shirley Clarke Franklin - first woman mayor of Atlanta, Georgia
- Vanessa Northington Gamble - physician; authority on public health; chaired the Tuskegee Syphilis Study Legacy Committee
- Arrah Lee Gaul - painter
- Julie Gold - Grammy-winning songwriter, singer (1974)
- Tina Sloan Green - athlete
- Edith Grossman - translator of modern Latin American literature
- Helene Hanff - author, wrote 84 Charing Cross Road
- Barbara Harris - first woman ordained a bishop of the Episcopal Church
- Carolyn Haywood - children's writer, illustrator and painter
- Lillian Hoban - illustrator and children's writer; published in over 1,400 publications; Lewis Carroll Shelf and Christopher Award winner
- Minnie Kenny - cryptologist; early NSA employee; former chief of Language and Linguistics for the Office of Techniques and Standards of the NSA
- Virginia Knauer - economic advisor to President Nixon and President Ford; first director of the Office of Consumer Affairs
- Milly Koss - computing pioneer
- Pinkie Gordon Lane - first African American poet laureate of Louisiana
- Carol Lazzaro-Weis - professor of Italian and French, translator and scholar
- Lisa Lopes - member of the best-selling female American group of all time, TLC
- Frederica Massiah-Jackson - president of the Philadelphia Court of Common Pleas
- Jeanette DuBois Meech - evangelist and industrial educator
- Pauline Oberdorfer Minor - one of the founders of Delta Sigma Theta sorority
- Wanda Nesbitt - U.S. ambassador to Namibia (1974)
- Barbara Nissman - concert pianist in the grand Romantic tradition
- Ann Hobson Pilot - principal harpist, Boston Symphony Orchestra
- Howardena Pindell - artist, first African American curator at MoMA, activist for minorities in the arts, researcher, and author
- Rebecca S. Pringle - president, National Education Association
- Liza Redfield - conductor, pianist, and composer; first woman to be the full-time conductor of a Broadway pit orchestra
- Katherine Gilmore Richardson - politician; Philadelphia city councilmember at-large
- Lisa Richette - Philadelphia Court of Common Pleas judge, legal pioneer, social activist, and author
- Judith Rodin - first woman president of the University of Pennsylvania; president of the Rockefeller Foundation
- Jill Scott - singer and actress
- Dolores Sloviter - first woman named chief judge of the U.S. Court of Appeals, Third Circuit
- Marion Stokes - civil rights activist, founding board member of the National Organization for Women, and philanthropist; data and media archivist who recorded every news broadcast for decades; her 70,000 tapes are being digitized by the Internet Archive
- Zoe Strauss - photographer; nominee member of Magnum Photos
- C. Delores Tucker - politician and civil rights activist
- Mary L. Washington - politician
- Helen L. Weiss - composer and pianist
- Lisa Yuskavage - artist

== Controversy ==
Student Hafsah Abdur-Rahman was denied a diploma on stage by the school principal after performing the Griddy dance during the graduation ceremony on June 9, 2023.

== Notable faculty ==
- Ida Augusta Keller - plant physiologist; taught at the school 1893–1930

== Sources ==
- The Public Schools of Philadelphia: Historical, Biographical, Statistical by John Trevor Custis, Burk & McFetridge Co. Publisher, 1897, Pg. 153&c.: Girls' Normal School, Girl's High School, Girls' High and Normal School
