= Liza Redfield =

American conductor, pianist, and composer (1924–2018)

- Born: Betty Weisman; 1 August 1924; Philadelphia
- Died: December 23, 2018 (aged 94); Manhattan
- Education: Philadelphia High School for Girls; University of Pennsylvania
- Occupations: conductor pianist composer
- Parents: Issac Weisman (father); Sophie Weisman (mother)

Liza Redfield (born Betty Weisman; 11 August 1924, Philadelphia - 23 December 2018, Manhattan) was an American conductor, pianist, and composer who is chiefly remembered for being the first woman to be the full-time conductor of a Broadway pit orchestra; a feat she achieved in 1960 when she was appointed music director of The Music Man during its initial run.

== Early life and education ==
Born to Issac Weisman, a tailor, and Sophie (Becker) Weisman, a homemaker, Liza Redfield was a piano prodigy who was performing recitals by age 8. She graduated from the Philadelphia High School for Girls and earned a music degree from the University of Pennsylvania. She planned a career as a classical pianist, but after graduating from university at age 19 she decided that she didn't enjoy the constant practice and performing. By her own account she "ran off and got married and went to live in New York," where she switched to popular jazz. The marriage to Ira Leff was over quickly, but Redfield found work doing orchestrations for recording companies. Her stage name was supposedly inspired by her red hair.

== Conducting career ==
Redfield's first experience as a conductor was in recording sessions of the songs from The Amazing Adele, a forgotten musical of the mid-1950s with Tammy Grimes that never made it to Broadway. Later she studied conducting with Vladimir Brailowsky, who also encouraged her to continue her piano studies. Redfield took a job as a conductor in a Detroit summer theater, on productions including Damn Yankees, The Mikado and South Pacific.

Her work in regional theater eventually led to conducting jobs with two off-Broadway musicals in 1960, Miss Emily Adams and Ernest in Love. Redfield's big break came when she was appointed orchestra director for Music Man. She later recalled: "Women seemed more surprised and pleased than men. Female members of the audience would come up to me after the show and tell me how pleased they were that I was conducting." An amusing sidelight of her conducting career was her appearance on panel game show What's My Line? in 1960. The panel failed to guess her occupation, though Dorothy Kilgallen asked if she was one of the strippers in Gypsy.

After Music Man, Redfield was the conductor for Broadway shows Sophie, Good News, and Charlie and Algernon, none of which lasted more than a few weeks. She worked through the 1980s with touring Broadway shows and pre-Broadway tryouts. She was also a composer and created music for the reopening of Ford's Theater in Washington, D.C. in 1968.

== Death ==
Liza Redfield's death in 2018 at the Amsterdam Nursing Home in Manhattan.
