= Rinaldo Bonanno =

Italian sculptor

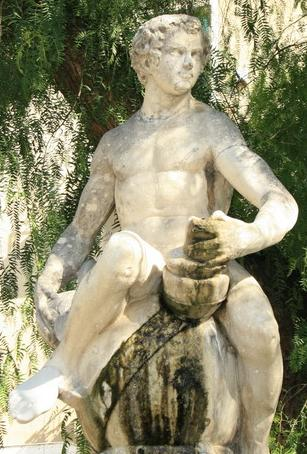
Fontana Gennaro, Messina (1590), attributed to Bonanno.

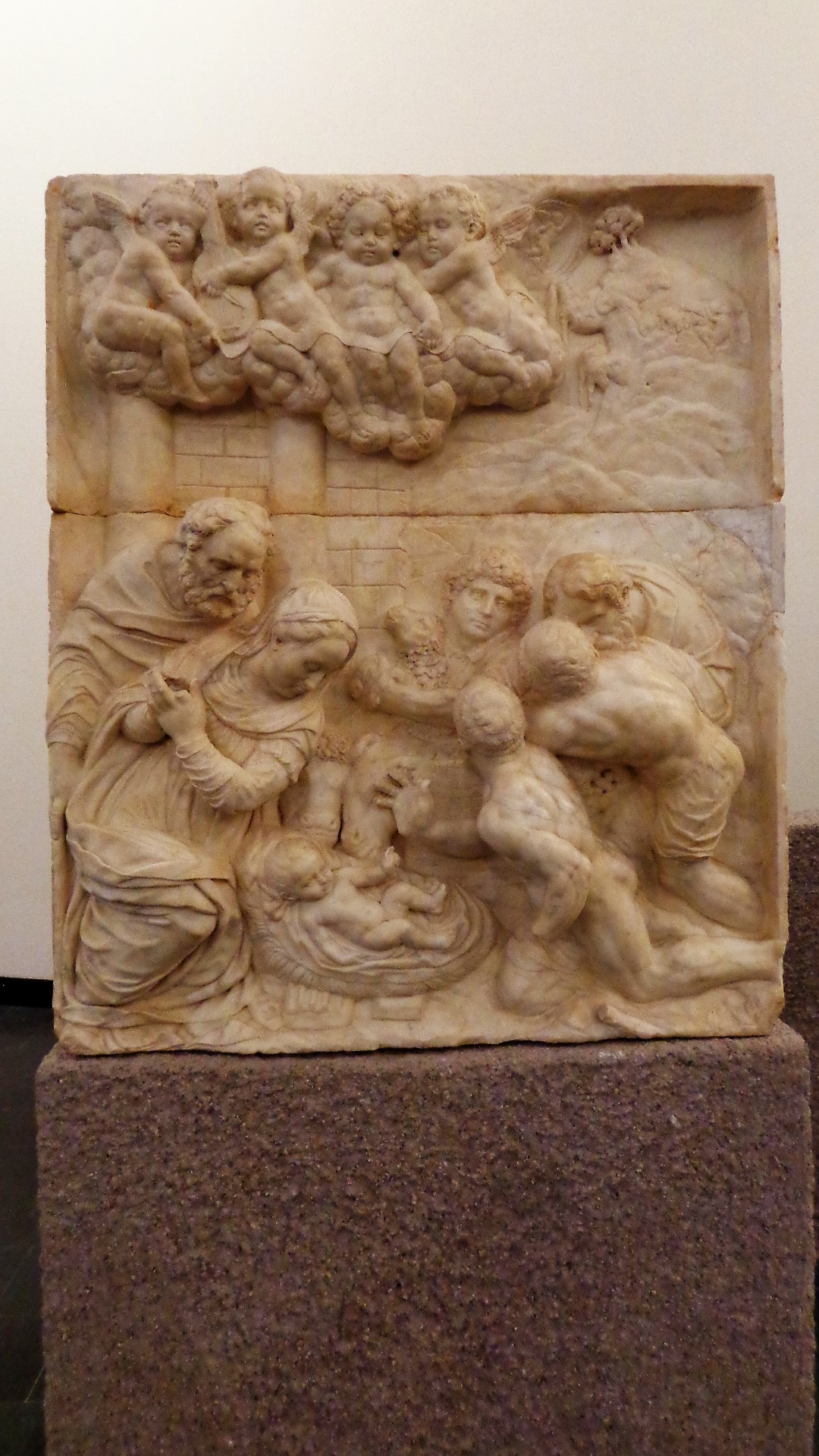
Adoration of the Shepherds, Museo regionale di Messina.

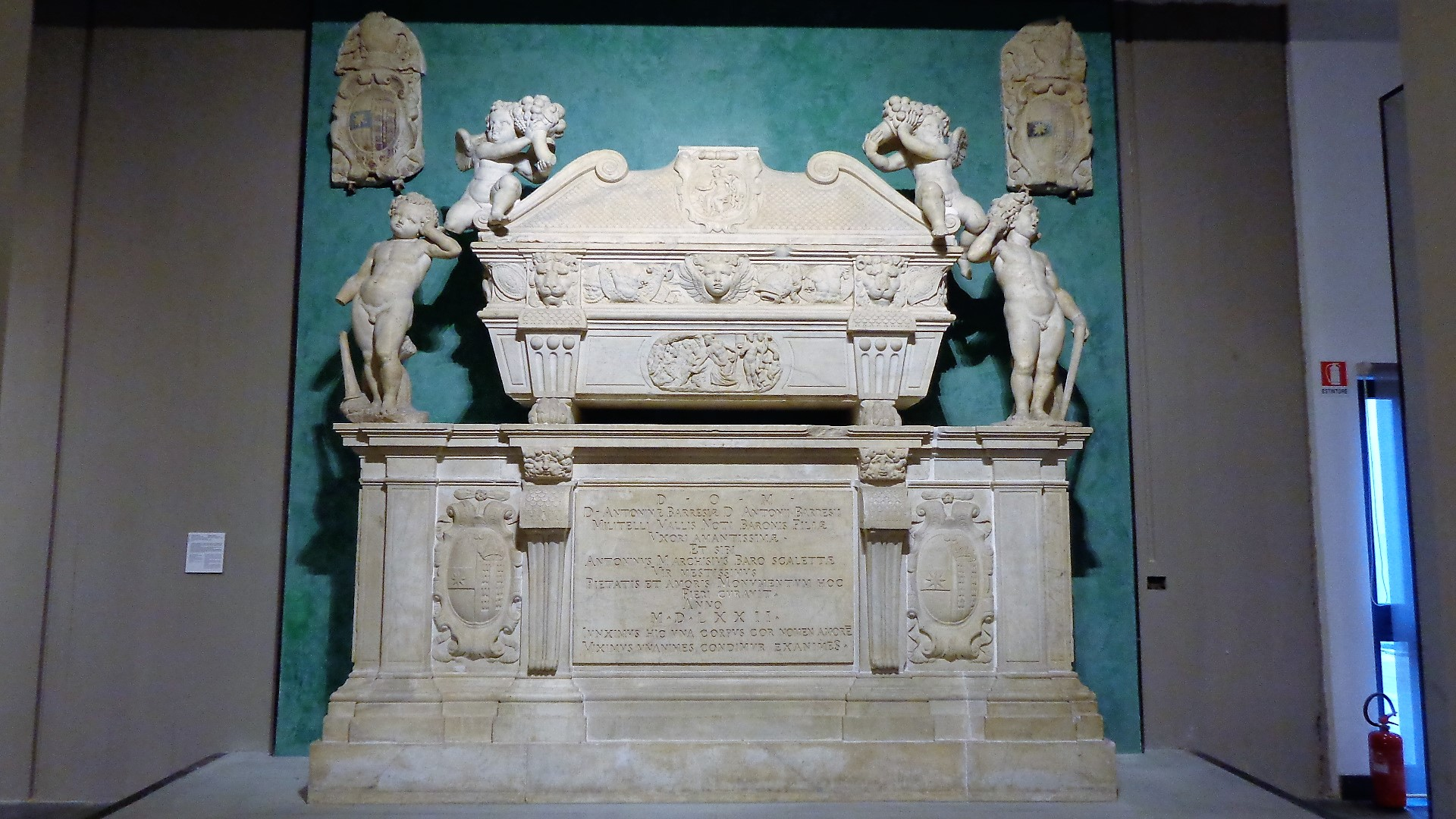
Marchesi-Barresi Tomb Monument, Museo regionale di Messina.

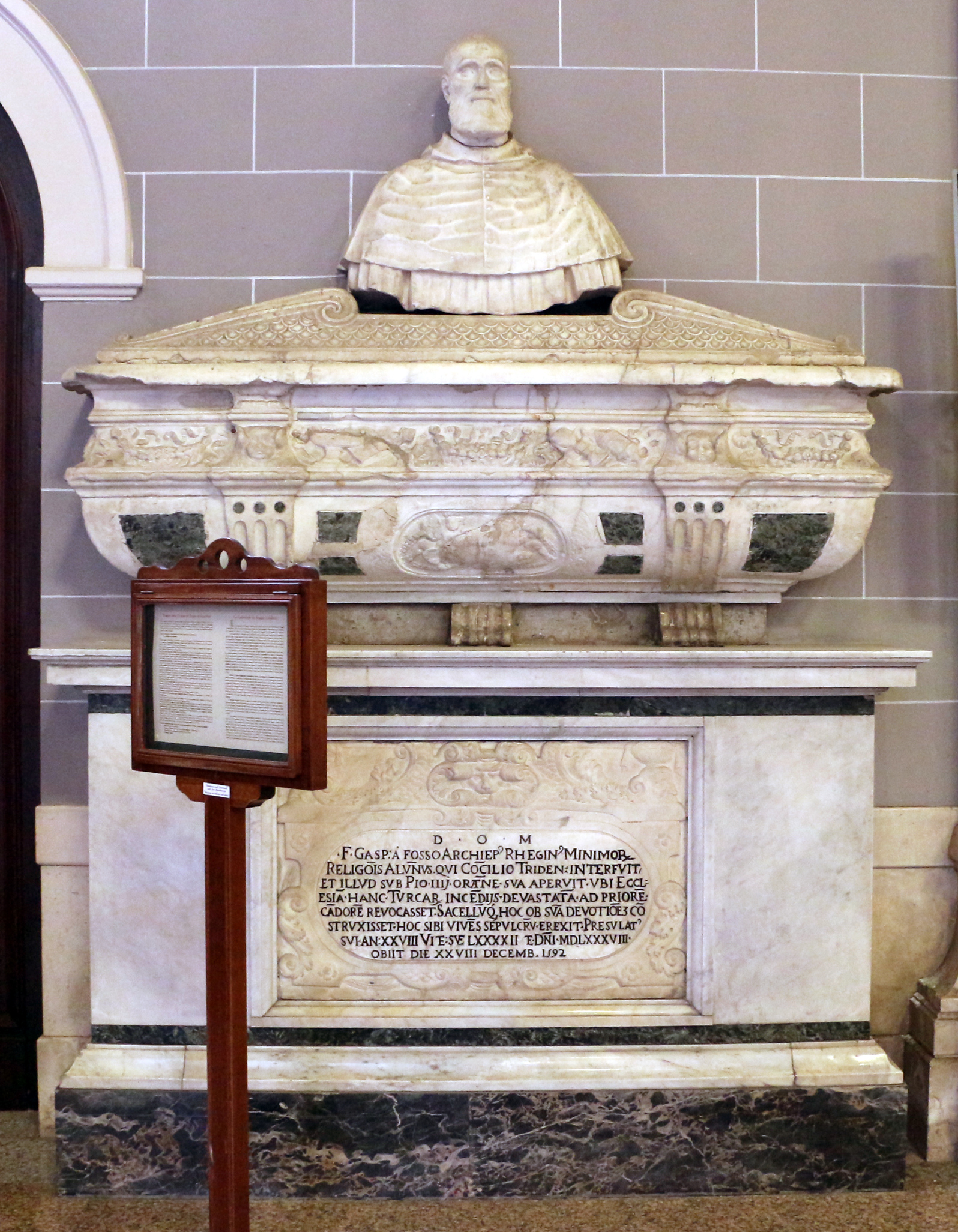
Tomb of Gaspare Ricciulli Del Fosso, 1588, Duomo di Reggio Calabria.

Rinaldo Bonanno (1545-1600) was an Italian sculptor. Born in Raccuja, he is notable for his work in Sicily in the second half of the 16th century. His whole oeuvre was heavily influenced by the Tuscan tradition and the style of Michelangelo, but combined these with elements of the late Gothic style (as seen in the expressive drapery) and influences from the work of Gagini. Despite his 'archaizing' traits, he is considered one of the best sculptors active in that era in Sicily.

== Life ==
A pupil of Giovanni Agnolo and Martino da Messina and then from 1577 of Martino Montanini (who in 1577 became Giovanni Angelo Montorsoli's successor as head of the works on the Duomo)

In 1580 he also worked at Massa for prince Alberico Cibo and in Carrara on the construction of the Grondine canal. He also produced several wood and marble sculptures for churches in Sicily and southern Calabria. He married the daughter of Andrea Calamech and followed in that artist's footsteps by becoming not only a sculptor but also an architect, producing designs for works such as the facade of the Madre church in Alì (1584) and stage sets.

== Bibliography ==
- (in Italian) Michael Kiene, Michela D’Angelo, Massimo Lo Curzio, 1823 Hittorff a Messina. La scoperta di una città nuova, EDAS La Volta, Collana di Studi e Progetti di Architettura, Messina 2017. ISBN 978-88-7820-473-7, pp. 192–214. ISBN 978-88-7820-473-7. In particular see: F. Galletta, Cronaca di una scoperta/Post Scriptum, pp. 192–198; F. Galletta, Un luogo di delizie, pp. 199–206; F. Sondrio, Una storia che continua, pp. 207–214.
