= Di Lazzaro =

Di Lazzaro is a surname of Italian origin. Notable people with this surname include:

- Dalila Di Lazzaro (born 1953), Italian actress
- Eldo Di Lazzaro (1902–1968), Italian composer
- Elisa Di Lazzaro (born 1998), Italian hurdler

== See also ==
- Lazzaro
