= Carolyn Haywood =

American writer

- Born: January 3, 1898; Philadelphia, PA, US
- Died: January 11, 1990 (aged 92)
- Occupations: Writer, illustrator
- Writing career
- Genre: Children's literature
- Notable works: Betsy series; Eddie series

Carolyn Haywood (January 3, 1898 – January 11, 1990) was an American writer and illustrator from Philadelphia, Pennsylvania. She created 47 children's books, most notably the series under the "Eddie" and "Betsy" titles.

== Life and career ==
Carolyn Haywood was brought up in a middle-class home. Her parents, Charles and Mary Emma Haywood, encouraged her creative abilities. Haywood attended Philadelphia High School for Girls, and graduated in 1922 from the Philadelphia Normal School. The same year, she was employed at the Friends Central School in Wynnewood, Pennsylvania as a third-grade teacher. This inspired Haywood to write books for children.

In 1923, Haywood enrolled in the Pennsylvania Academy of Fine Arts with a scholarship and became interested in portrait painting. In 1925, she won a Cresson Traveling Scholarship to travel in Europe. She returned to Philadelphia, after a year. Haywood was then employed as a studio assistant by Violet Oakley. Haywood worked on murals in the Philadelphia area during this time, some of which are still extant today.

Subsequently, Haywood pursued both art and writing. Her first children's book, "B" is for Betsy, was published in 1939. She was inspired by Elizabeth Hamilton, juvenile department editor at Harcourt Brace to write about the experiences of American children. Haywood used her personal observations and childhood experiences to write her books. Haywood continued to write until the end of her life.

== Selected works ==
Betsy Books

- “B” is for Betsy. New York: Harcourt Brace, 1939.
- Betsy and Billy. New York: Harcourt Brace, 1941.
- Back to School With Betsy. New York: Harcourt Brace, 1943.
- Betsy and the Boys. New York: Harcourt Brace, 1945.
- Betsy’s Little Star. New York: Morrow, 1950.
- Betsy and the Circus. New York: Morrow, 1954.
- Betsy's Busy Summer. New York: Morrow, 1956.
- Betsy's Winterhouse. New York: Morrow, 1958.
- Snowbound with Betsy. New York: Morrow, 1962.
- Betsy and Mr. Kilpatrick. New York: Morrow, 1967.
- Merry Christmas from Betsy. New York: Morrow, 1970.
- Betsy's Play School. New York: Morrow, 1977. Illustrated by James Griffin.

Eddie Books

- Little Eddie. New York: Morrow, 1947.
- Eddie and the Fire Engine. New York: Morrow, 1949.
- Eddie and Gardenia. New York: Morrow, 1951.
- Eddie's Pay Dirt. New York: Morrow, 1953.
- Eddie and his Big Deals. New York: Morrow, 1955.
- Eddie Makes Music. New York: Morrow, 1957.
- Eddie and Louella. New York: Morrow, 1959
- Annie Pat and Eddie. New York: Morrow, 1960.
- Eddie's Green Thumb. New York: Morrow, 1964.
- Eddie the Dog Holder. New York: Morrow, 1966.
- Ever-ready Eddie. New York: Morrow, 1968
- Eddie's Happenings. New York: Morrow, 1971.
- Eddie's Valuable Property. New York: Morrow, 1975.
- Eddie’s Menagerie. New York: Morrow, 1978. Illustrated by Ingrid Fetz.
- Merry Christmas from Eddie. New York: Morrow, 1986.
- Eddie's Friend Boodles. New York: Morrow, 1991. Illustrated by Catherine Stock.

Other Books

- Primrose Day. New York: Harcourt Brace, 1942.
- Here's a Penny. New York: Harcourt Brace, 1944.
- Penny and Peter. New York: Harcourt Brace, 1946.
- Penny Goes to Camp. New York: Morrow, 1948.
- The Mixed-Up Twins. New York: Morrow, 1952.
- Here Comes the Bus! New York: Morrow, 1963.
- Robert Rows the River. New York: Morrow, 1965.
- Taffy and Melissa Molasses. New York: Morrow, 1969.
- Two and Two are Four. New York: Morrow, 1968.
- A Christmas Fantasy. New York: Morrow, 1972. Illustrated by Glenys and Victor Ambrus.
- Away Went the Balloons. New York: Morrow, 1973.
- "C" Is for Cupcake. New York: Morrow, 1974.
- A Valentine Fantasy. New York: Morrow, 1976. Illustrated by Glenys and Victor Ambrus.
- Halloween Treats. New York: Morrow, 1981. Illustrated by Victoria de Larrea.
- The King's Monster. New York: Morrow, 1980. Illustrated by Victor Ambrus.
- Santa Claus Forever! New York: Morrow, 1982. Illustrated by Glenys and Victor Ambrus.
- Make a Joyful Noise: Bible Verses for Children. Philadelphia: Westminster Press, 1984. Illustrated by Lane Yerkes.
- Happy Birthday from Carolyn Haywood. New York: Morrow, 1984. Illustrated by Wendy Watson.
- Summer Fun. New York: Morrow, 1986. Illustrated by Julie Durrell.
- How the Reindeer Saved Santa. New York: Morrow, 1986. Illustrated by Victor Ambrus.
- Hello, Star. New York: Morrow, 1987. Illustrated by Julie Durrell.
