= Lisa Richette =

American judge

Lisa Aversa Richette

Judge of the Philadelphia County Court of Common Pleas
- Incumbent
- Assumed office 1971

Personal details
- Born: Lisa Aversa; September 11, 1928 Philadelphia, Pennsylvania
- Died: October 26, 2007 (aged 79) Vitas Hospice, St Agnes' Continuing Care Center, South Philadelphia, Pennsylvania
- Party: Democratic Party (United States)
- Parent(s): Domenico Aversa and Maria (Giannini) Aversa
- Education: University of Pennsylvania; Yale Law School

Lisa Aversa Richette (September 11, 1928 – October 26, 2007) was an American lawyer and judge of the Court of Common Pleas in Philadelphia County. A lifelong Philadelphian, she was appointed to the bench in 1971 by Pennsylvania Governor Milton Shapp. Noted for her outspokenness, she was a social activist, particularly in the areas of homelessness, child welfare, and juvenile justice.

In 1973, she was honored with the Gimbel Philadelphia Award for outstanding service to humanity.

During her funeral eulogy, Richette was described by Philadelphia Daily News staff writer Kitty Caparella as "a true Renaissance woman" who "wouldn't allow herself to be manipulated, intimidated, or marginalized," and who was also "a humanist who set her own agenda and mentored others, whether law students, homeless advocates, or defendants."

== Formative years ==
Born as Lisa Aversa in Philadelphia, Pennsylvania on September 11, 1928, Lisa A. Richette was a daughter of realtor Domenico Aversa and Maria (Giannini) Aversa, a native of Santa Caterina dello Ionio, Italy. She grew up in that city's South Philadelphia neighborhood, in a household in which both English and Italian were frequently spoken. Her brother, Robert J. Aversa, followed their father into the family's real estate business.

A graduate of the Philadelphia High School for Girls prior to earning her bachelor's degree as a Phi Beta Kappa graduate of the University of Pennsylvania, she became one of the first female graduates of the Yale Law School in 1952.

== Legal career ==
Following her graduation from Yale, Richette returned to Philadelphia, where she opened a law practice. Appointed as an assistant district attorney, one of a handful of groundbreaking women in the local legal profession, along with the future, long-serving Philadelphia district attorney Lynne Abraham, Richette often wore pants and long dangling earrings in court at a time when it was considered almost risqué for a female attorney to do so, and was once thrown out of court for wearing a pantsuit. She also taught at Yale Law School and Villanova University as a visiting lecturer, and subsequently rose through the ranks to become chief of the Family Court Division of the Office of the District Attorney, a post which she held from 1956 to 1964.

Richette, who authored the 1969 book on the juvenile justice system in Philadelphia, The Throwaway Children, subsequently toured the United States, speaking about problems within America's judicial system. Sales of her book quickly resulted in her publisher issuing a second printing. She then wrote a second book, The Now Generation. During the early 1970s, she continued to practice law while also heading the Hiroshima Program, a peace advocacy organization that sponsored a protest against the Vietnam War in August 1971.

In December 1971, she was appointed judge of the Court of Common Pleas for Philadelphia County by Governor Milton Shapp, becoming one of the first women to hold that office.

During the summer of 1973, she presented a lecture regarding her recently published paper, "A Special Savor of Nobility: Confronting the Dehumanization in Children's Justice," at the Twentieth Summer Conference (“The Humanizing and Dehumanizing of Man”) of the Institute on Religion in an Age of Science, which was held from July 28 to August 4 on Star Island in New Hampshire.

== Later years ==
During the 1980s Richette continued her juvenile justice advocacy, touring the United States as a guest lecturer. In January 1980, she delivered the Theleia Legal Society's second annual seminar address to female law students at the University of South Carolina. In late March of that year, she was a key speaker at the 11th Annual Child Abuse Conference in Dallas, Texas.

She also became more active in her advocacy of improving services for, and assistance to, homeless individuals and victims of child abuse.

Late in her life, Richette made local headlines on three occasions as a result of being physically assaulted. She was mugged in 1987, while "scores of people watched without helping her". In 2006, she was punched while waiting for her son to rent a video. In 2007, her son, Lawrence was charged with aggravated assault, simple assault, and reckless endangerment in connection with a domestic dispute that occurred on August 21, 2007.

A sitting member of Pennsylvania's judicial system for the remainder of her life, Richette was still serving as a senior Family Court judge at the time of her death in 2007.

=== Awards and other honors ===
In 1971, Richette was awarded the Signum Fidei Medal, the highest award given by the LaSalle College Alumni Association.

In 1984, she was awarded the Pearl S. Buck International Award.

By 1988, she had also been honored with the Alice B. Paul Woman of Courage Award, the Gimbel Philadelphia Award, and the National Sons and Daughters of the American Revolution's Medal of Honor.

== Public service ==
A member of Philadelphia's Consulting Committee on Children, she also served on the Council for Equal Job Opportunity and the Health and Welfare Council. In 1973, she founded the Child Abuse Prevention Effort (CAPE).

Known for being a devout Catholic, Richette frequently delivered meals to homeless members of the community and also volunteered regularly for the Sisters of Mercy hospice in Center City Philadelphia.

== Death and interment ==
Richette died from lung cancer at the Vitas Hospice in St Agnes' Continuing Care Center in South Philadelphia. She was seventy-nine. Her funeral mass was held at the Cathedral Basilica of Saints Peter and Paul in Philadelphia on Friday, November 2. She was then interred at the Saints Peter and Paul Cemetery in Marple Township.

In his homily during the funeral, the Rev. Robert Curry, her longtime spiritual advisor, described Richette as "an original," adding:

"Lisa was not larger than life—no one is.... Lisa was full of life, which was better, a vivid woman full of grace. She knew who she was."
