= Sarah A. Anderson =

American politician (1901–1992)

Member of the Pennsylvania House of Representatives from the 193rd district
- In office 1969–1972
- Preceded by: District created
- Succeeded by: Donald W. Dorr

Member of the Pennsylvania House of Representatives from the Philadelphia County district
- In office 1955–1968

Personal details
- Born: January 25, 1901 Jacksonville, Florida, U.S.
- Died: December 9, 1992 (aged 91) Philadelphia, Pennsylvania, U.S.
- Resting place: West Laurel Hill Cemetery, Bala Cynwyd, Pennsylvania, U.S.
- Party: Democratic
- Spouse(s): Dr. A. W. Anderson, Sr.
- Occupation: Pennsylvania State Representative

Sarah A. Anderson (January 25, 1901 – December 9, 1992) was an American politician who served as a Democratic member of the Pennsylvania House of Representatives for the Philadelphia County district from 1955 to 1968 and the 193rd district from 1969 to 1972. She was the first black woman to preside over the General Assembly and to serve as chairwoman of the Health and Welfare Committee.

== Early life and education ==
Born in Jacksonville, Florida, on January 25, 1901, Anderson was a daughter of Dr. Harry Anderson, the first practicing black dentist in Florida. She graduated from the Philadelphia High School for Girls and Philadelphia Normal School.

She worked as an elementary school teacher in the Philadelphia public schools.

== Public service and political career ==
A member of the 30th Ward Democratic Committee, she also served as an inspector for the Philadelphia Elections Board, as a member of the 44th Ward Executive Committee, as a judge for the 24th Division Election Board, as a member of District 1 of the Democratic Executive Committee, and as a legislative consultant for the United States Department of Veterans Affairs.

A Democrat, she was elected to the Pennsylvania House of Representatives for the 1955 term and served for nine consecutive terms. She was known as an advocate for the rights of children, minorities, women and the impaired, and was the first black woman to preside over the General Assembly and serve as chairwoman of the Health and Welfare Committee, a post she held for four years. As chair of the Health and Welfare Committee in 1970, she was at the center of debates about legalizing abortion in Pennsylvania.

In 1956, she was an alternate delegate to National Democratic Convention; in 1960, she was elected as a delegate to the National Democratic Convention. She then also served as an appointed member of the: Commission on Philadelphia School Charter, Pennsylvania Historical and Museum Commission, Governor's Commission on the Status of Women, Governor's Council on Drugs, Governor's Task Force on Human Services, and State Advisory Committee on Mental Health/Mental Retardation.

She opted not to stand as a candidate for reelection to the House for its 1973 term, retiring instead in 1972.

== Accomplishments and legacy ==
Anderson secured the passage of legislation which made kidney dialysis services accessible in underserved communities via the use of mobile units, helped raise awareness regarding sickle cell anemia, helped secure the passage of legislation to increase funding for mental health treatment services, and supported efforts which helped improve the quality of life for blind and visually impaired residents across Pennsylvania. In 1963, she played a key role in the establishment of the junior college which ultimately became the Community College of Philadelphia. In 1965, she sponsored a fair housing bill. In 1972, she was honored by the Pennsylvania Commission on the Status of Women, for her sponsorship of the Pennsylvania Equal Rights Amendment and other efforts for women's rights in the state.

== Death and interment ==
A resident of West Philadelphia during her final years, Anderson died on December 9, 1992, in Philadelphia, Pennsylvania, and was interred at the West Laurel Hill Cemetery in Bala Cynwyd, Pennsylvania. She was preceded in death by her husband, Dr. Adolphus W. Anderson Sr., a podiatrist.
