= Catherine Wallen =

American politician

Member of the Pennsylvania House of Representatives
- Incumbent
- Assumed office April 13, 2026
- Preceded by: Torren Ecker
- Constituency: 193rd district

Personal details
- Party: Republican Party
- Website: www.taxpayersforwallen.com

Catherine Wallen is an American politician and member of the Pennsylvania House of Representatives. A member of the Pennsylvania Republican Party, she was elected in a special election in March 2026.
