= Statue of John of Austria =

Sculpture in Messina, Italy

Monument to John of Austria
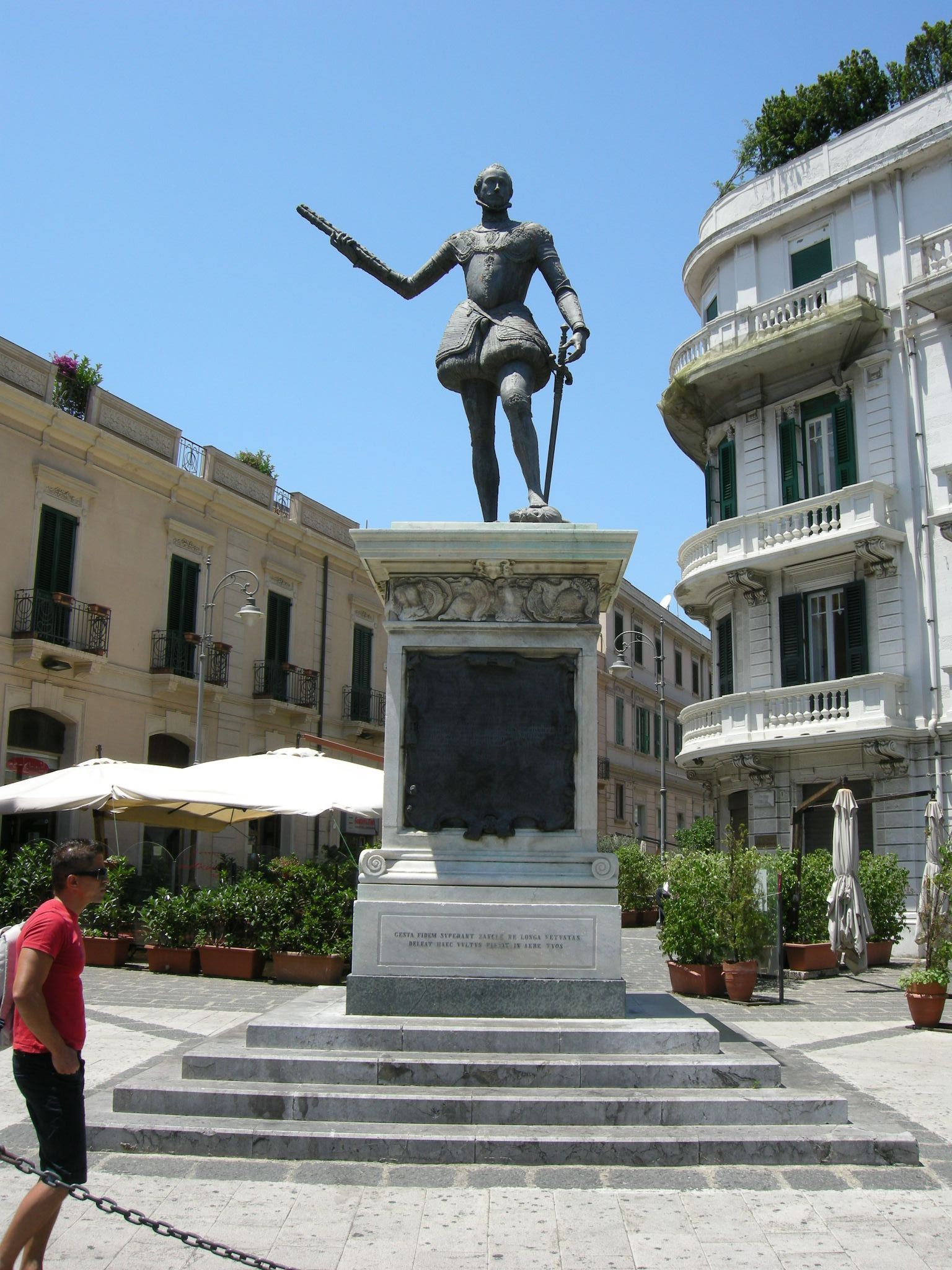
- Interactive map of Monument to John of Austria
- Location: Piazza Catalani, Messina
- Designer: Andrea Calamech
- Material: Bronze
- Dedicated date: 1572
- Restored date: 1908
- Dedicated to: John of Austria

John of Austria or Don Giovanni d'Austria is a monumental sculpture in bronze, originally gilded, of John of Austria by architect and sculptor Andrea Calamech, a native of Carrara who trained in the Florentine workshop of Bartolomeo Ammannati. Its erection was decided by the Senate of Messina in 1571 to honor the victor of the Battle of Lepanto, from which many Messineses had benefited, and it was dedicated in 1572. William Stirling-Maxwell called it "one of the most effective monuments of sixteenth-century art". On the sides of the pedestal are bronze plaques depicting the fleet, the battle, and the fleet's victorious return to Messina as well as an inscription. John is figured holding a three-pronged baton in reference to his command of the triple alliance of Philip II, the Pope, and the Republic of Venice, with his foot on the severed head of a vanquished Turk generally considered to be Müezzinzade Ali Pasha.

The monument was initially located between Messina's Royal Palace and the Church of Our Lady of the Pillar. After being damaged in the Sicilian revolution of 1848, it was moved in 1853 to face the Church of Santissima Annunziata dei Teatini (it). After the destructions of the 1908 Messina earthquake, it was moved again to its current location in 1928.

A copy of the statue was erected on Zieroldsplatz in Regensburg, John's birthplace, in 1978 on the fourth centenary of his death.

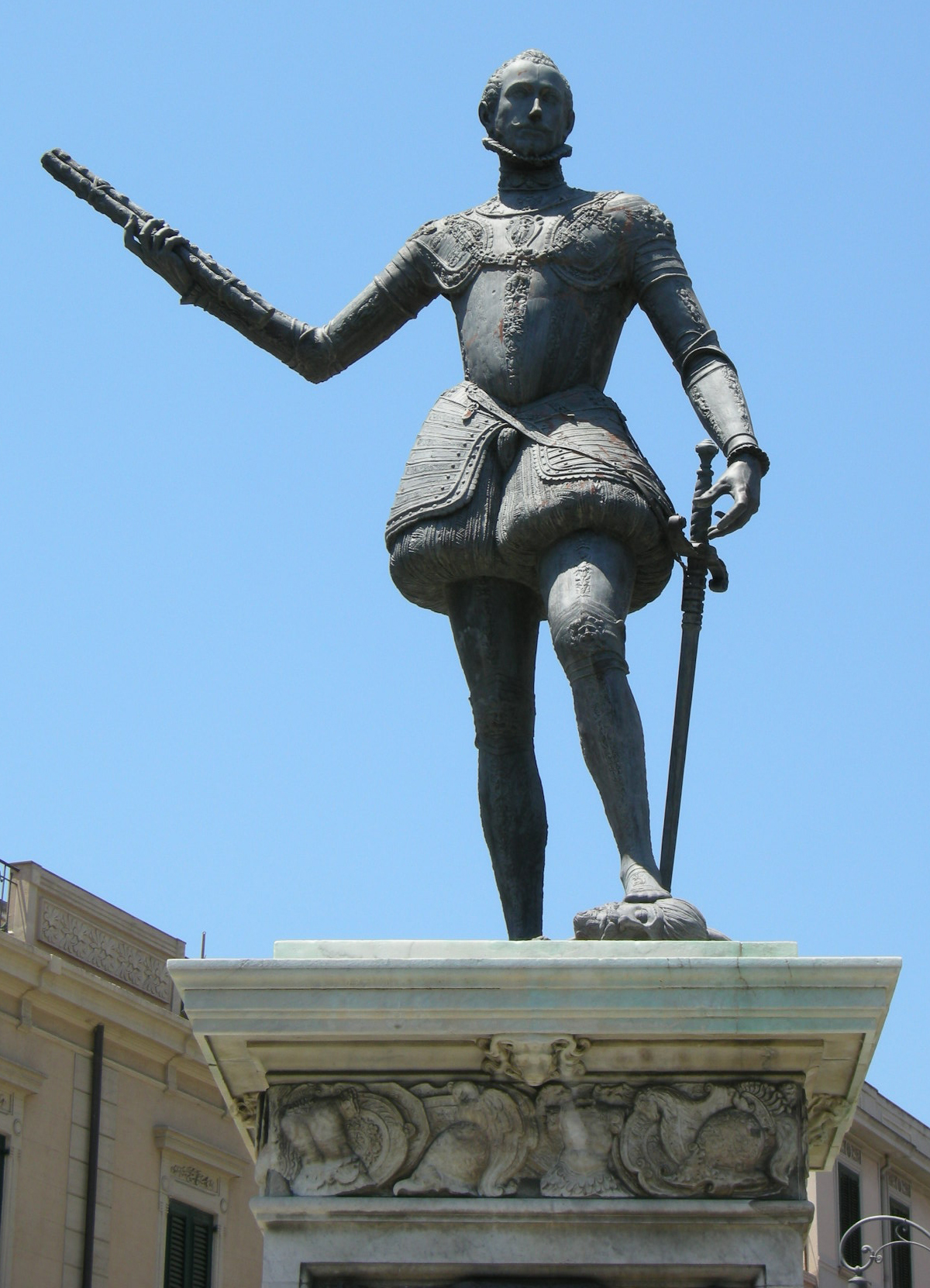
The statue

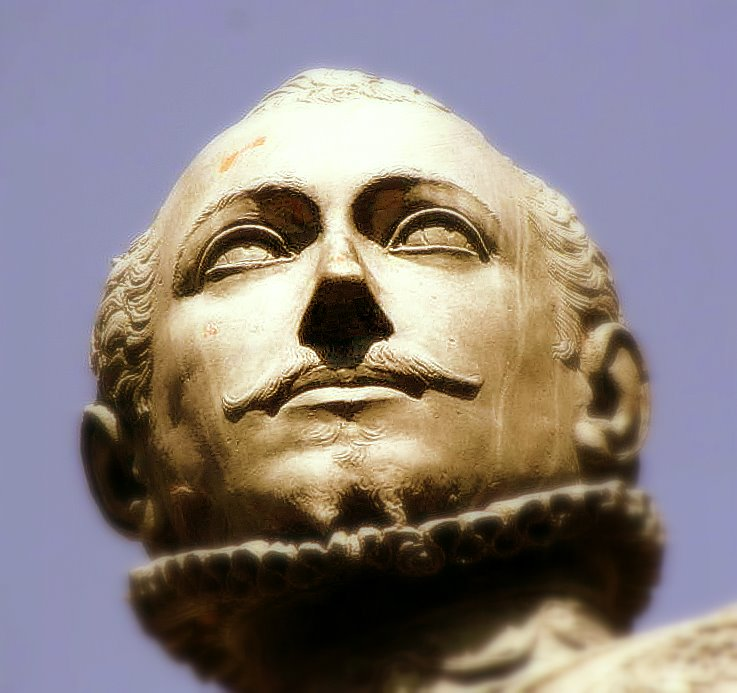
Detail of the head

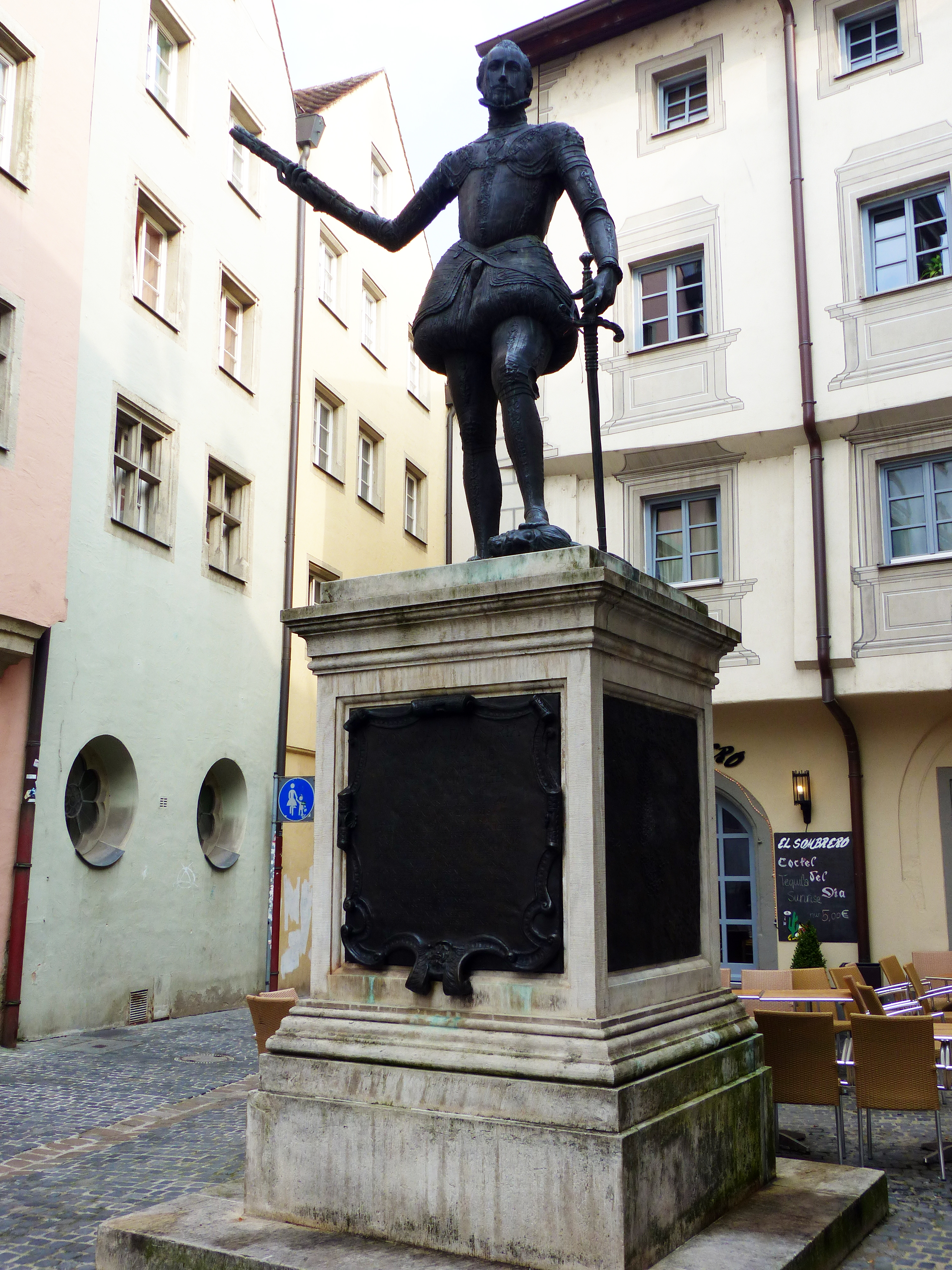
Copy in Regensburg

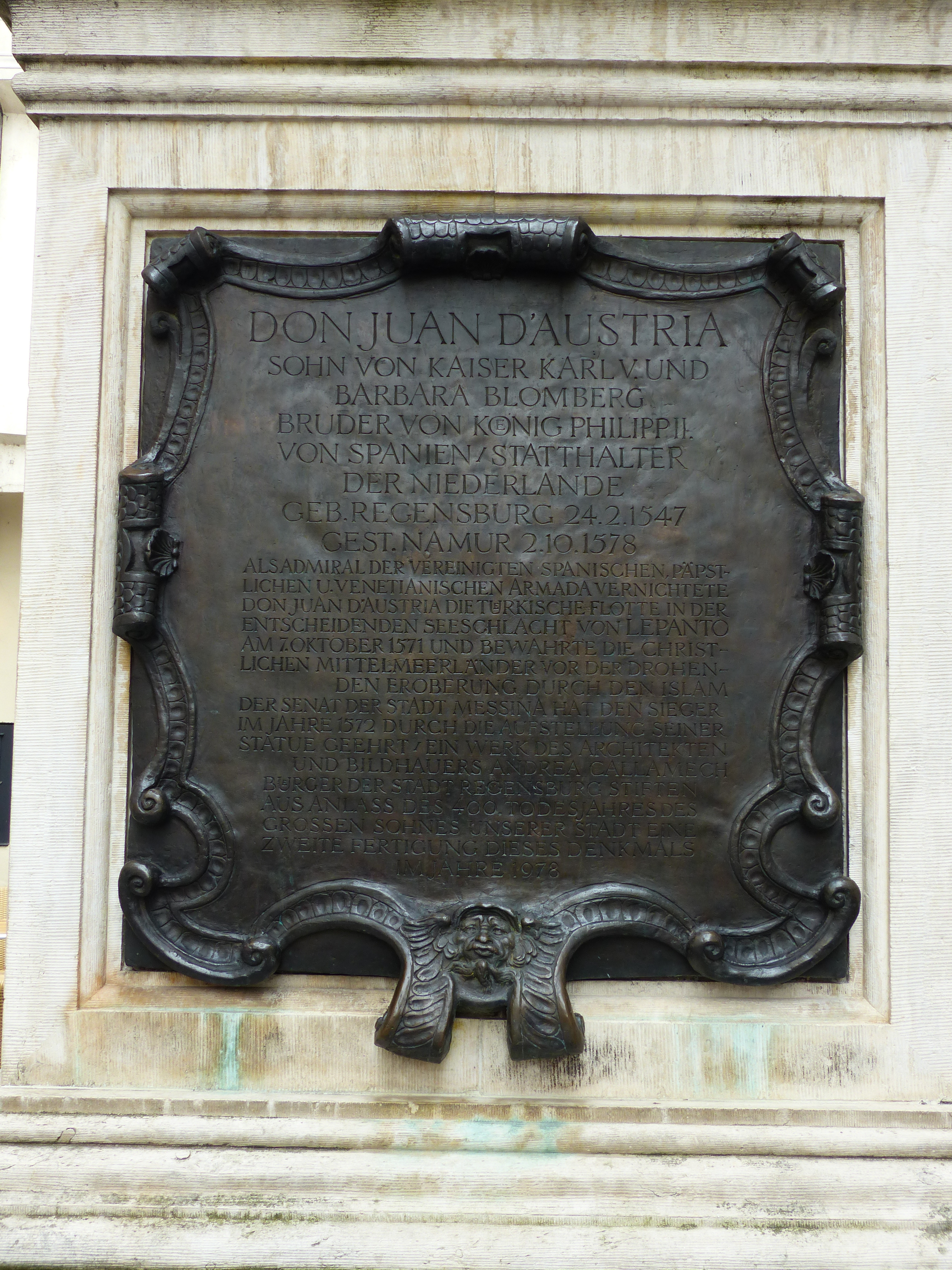
Dedicactory inscription under the Regensburg statue
