= Steven R. Nickol =

American politician

Member of the Pennsylvania House of Representatives from the 193rd district
- In office January 1, 1991 – November 30, 2008
- Preceded by: Donald Dorr
- Succeeded by: Will Tallman

Personal details
- Born: November 28, 1950 (age 75) Auburn, New York
- Party: Republican
- Spouse: Rosemarie Zolata Nickol

Steven R. Nickol was a member of the Pennsylvania House of Representatives representing the 193rd State House district, which then included areas of Adams and York counties. He was a member of the Republican Party.

Nickol is a 1968 graduate of the York County Day School. In 1972, he graduated from Franklin and Marshall College.

He was initially elected to the Pennsylvania House in 1990, and has been re-elected in every election since. Prior to serving in the legislature himself, Nickol was chief of staff to Pennsylvania State Senator Ralph Hess.

Nickol announced his intention to retire at the end of his term in 2009 and currently is employed by the Pennsylvania State Education Association.
