= Carol Lazzaro-Weis =

American scholar (1949–2022)

- Carol M. Lazzaro (later Lazzaro-Weis), from the 1967 yearbook of the Philadelphia High School for Girls
- Born: December 11, 1949; Philadelphia, Pennsylvania
- Died: February 26, 2022 (age 72); Columbia, Missouri
- Occupations: College professor, scholar of Romance languages

Carol Marie Lazzaro-Weis (December 11, 1949 – February 26, 2022) was an American scholar of Romance languages. She was a professor of French and Italian at Southern University from 1984 to 2003, and at the University of Missouri from 2003 to 2017. From 2009 to 2015, she was president of the American Association for Italian Studies.

== Early life and education ==
Carol Marie Lazzaro was born in Philadelphia, the daughter of Domenic J. Lazzaro and Marie Caruso Lazzaro. She graduated from the Philadelphia High School for Girls in 1967, earned a bachelor's degree in French from the Pennsylvania State University, and completed a master's degree in French from Villanova University. She earned a second master's degree in Romance languages from the University of Pennsylvania. She completed doctoral studies in Romance languages in 1978, at the University of Pennsylvania.

== Career ==
Lazzaro held teaching posts at Louisiana State University, University of Maryland, and Southern University (from 1984 to 2003), before becoming a professor of French and Italian and chair of the Romance Languages department at the University of Missouri in 2003. From 2011 to 2014, she held a named chair, as Catherine Paine Middlebush Professor. She retired with emeritus status in 2017.

Lazzaro-Weis was president of the American Association for Italian Studies from 2009 to 2015. She ran Missouri's study abroad program in Lyon, and directed the Honors College at Southern University.

== Publications ==
Lazzaro-Weis translated literary and historical works from French and Italian into English, and published her research in academic journals including Neophilologus, Studies in Eighteenth-Century Culture, Italica, NWSA Journal, Connotations, and Annali d'Italianistica. Her book From Margins to Mainstream: Feminism and Fictional Modes in Italian Women's Writing (1969-1992) (1993) was praised as "an engaging and extensive analysis" and "a comprehensive, theoretically sophisticated, and valuable study of the intersection of feminist theory and contemporary Italian women's writing."

- "Prévost's comic romance: The Doyen de Killerine" (1983)
- "Feminism, Parody, and Characterization in Prévost: The Example of the Doyen de Killerine"
- "Gender and Genre in Italian Feminist Literature in the Seventies" (1988)
- "The Subject's Seduction: The Experience of Don Juan in Italian Feminist Fictions" (1989)
- "The Female 'Bildungsroman': Calling It into Question" (1990)
- Confused Epiphanies: L’Abbé Prévost and the Romance Tradition (1991)
- From Margins to Mainstream: Feminism and Fictional Modes in Italian Women's Writings (1969-1992) (1993)
- "Comparing the Trickster in a Postmodern Post-Colonial Critical World" (1996/1997)
- "20th-Century Italian Women Writers: The Feminine Experience" (1999, with Alba Amoia)
- "Oriana Fallaci: The Woman and the Myth" (2000, with Santo Arico)
- "The Signorina" and Other Stories (2001, by Anna Banti, translated by Martha King and Carol Lazzaro-Weis)
- "Memory and Mastery: Primo Levi as Writer and Witness" (2002, with Roberta S. Kremer)
- "Writing beyond Fascism: Cultural Resistance in the Life and Works of Alba de Cespedes" (2002, with Ellen Nerenberg and Carol C. Gallucci)
- Voyage aux prairies osages: Louisiane et Missouri, 1839-1840 (2012, by Victor Tixier, edited by Lazzaro-Weis; in French)

== Personal life ==
Lazzaro-Weis died from cancer on February 26, 2022, at the age of 72. She was survived by her son, Peter.
