= Will Tallman =

American politician

Member of the Pennsylvania House of Representatives from the 193rd district
- In office January 6, 2009 – December 31, 2018
- Preceded by: Steven R. Nickol
- Succeeded by: Torren Ecker

Personal details
- Party: Republican

Will Tallman is an American politician and is a former member of the Pennsylvania House of Representatives.

== Early career ==
Upon graduation from the Wisconsin School of Electronics, Tallman wrote technical manuals for Piper Aircraft in Lock Haven. Tallman later worked in several computer, engineering, and management positions for several companies in Pennsylvania. He was most recently self-employed performing computer networking and telephone line improvements for several small businesses in the Hanover and Gettysburg areas.

== Political career ==
Tallman was elected to represent the 193rd Legislative District in the Pennsylvania House of Representatives in November 2008. He initially represented parts of Adams and York County, Pennsylvania, but after the 2010 Census, the district was modified to span portions of Adams County and Cumberland County. In April 2009, Tallman was appointed to one of four seats on an Immigration Task Force developed by the Intergovernmental Affairs Committee of which he is also a member. The main purpose of the task force is to evaluate House Bill 1184 which was proposed by Harry Readshaw in order to tighten up citizenship regulations.

== Personal ==
Tallman and his wife live in New Oxford. They have four children, three of whom are missionaries and one who is in the US Army.
