= Anthony Lazzaro =

Anthony Lazzaro may refer to:

- Anthony Lazzaro (racing driver) (born 1963), NASCAR and sports car driver
- Anthony Lazzaro (university administrator) (1921–2021), American senior vice president emeritus of the University of Southern California
