= Lazzaro Mongiardini =

Italian mathematician

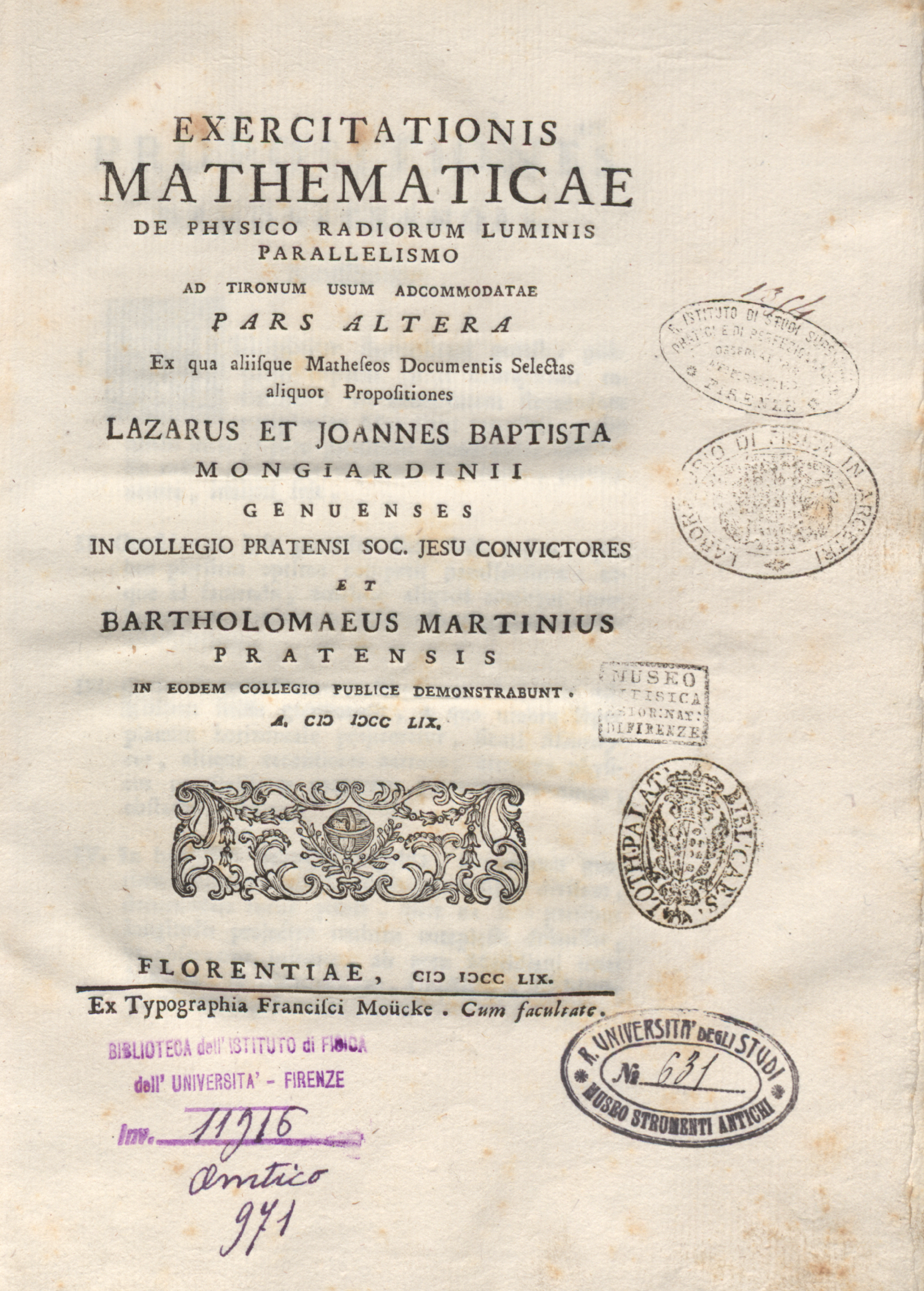
Exercitationis mathematicae de physico radiorum luminis parallelismo, 1759

Lazzaro Mongiardini was an 18th-century Italian mathematician.

== Works ==
- Exercitationis mathematicae de physico radiorum luminis parallelismo (in Latin). Florence: Francesco Moücke. 1759.
