= Latimore Township, Pennsylvania =

Township in Pennsylvania, US

Coordinates: 39°59′30″N 77°06′59″W

Latimore Township, Adams County, Pennsylvania
- Township
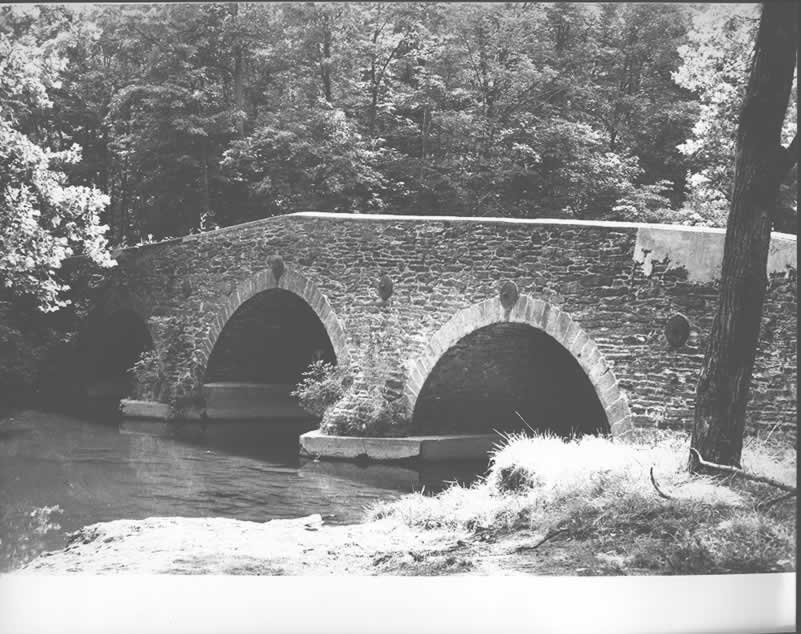
- Pond Mill Bridge

- Location in Adams County and the state of Pennsylvania.
- Country: United States
- State: Pennsylvania
- County: Adams
- Settled: 1749
- Incorporated: 1807

Government
  - Type: Board of Supervisors
  - Chairman: Dan Worley
  - Vice-Chairman: Larry Dost
  - Supervisor: Woody Myers

Area
  - Total: 21.48 sq mi (55.63 km^{2})
  - Land: 21.13 sq mi (54.73 km^{2})
  - Water: 0.35 sq mi (0.90 km^{2})

Population (2020)
  - Total: 2,644
  - Estimate (2023): 2,685
  - Density: 123.1/sq mi (47.52/km^{2})
- Time zone: UTC-5 (Eastern (EST))
  - Summer (DST): UTC-4 (EDT)
- Area code: 717
- FIPS code: 42-001-41672
- Website: www.latimore.org

Latimore Township is a township in Adams County, Pennsylvania, United States. The population was 2,580 at the 2010 census.

== History ==
Latimore Township was formed out of Huntington Township in 1807. The early township as formed was larger than today. In 1868, what is now the Borough of York Springs separated as a municipality. Mechanicsville, the only village in this township, was founded in 1800.

== Geography ==
According to the United States Census Bureau, the township has a total area of 21.5 square miles (55.7 km^{2}), of which 21.2 square miles (54.8 km^{2}) is land and 0.35 square miles (0.9 km^{2}), or 1.62%, is water. It is the northernmost township in Adams County. York Springs is directly to the southwest. U.S. Route 15 crosses the township, leading north to Dillsburg and Harrisburg, and south to Gettysburg and Washington, D.C. It contains part of the census-designated place of Lake Meade.

== Recreation ==
A portion of Pennsylvania State Game Lands Number 249 is located in Latimore County.

== Demographics ==
Historical population
Census	Pop.	Note	%±
2000	2,528		—
2010	2,580		2.1%
2020	2,644		2.5%
2023 (est.)	2,685		1.6%
U.S. Decennial Census

As of the census of 2000, there were 2,528 people, 914 households, and 732 families residing in the township. The population density was 119.1 inhabitants per square mile (46.0/km^{2}). There were 973 housing units at an average density of 45.9 per square mile (17.7/km^{2}). The racial makeup of the township was 97.78% White, 0.12% African American, 0.04% Native American, 0.36% Asian, 0.04% Pacific Islander, 0.83% from other races, and 0.83% from two or more races. Hispanic or Latino of any race were 1.86% of the population.

There were 914 households, out of which 35.0% had children under the age of 18 living with them, 71.4% were married couples living together, 5.4% had a female householder with no husband present, and 19.9% were non-families. 15.9% of all households were made up of individuals, and 6.8% had someone living alone who was 65 years of age or older. The average household size was 2.76 and the average family size was 3.09.

In the township the population was spread out, with 26.1% under the age of 18, 6.4% from 18 to 24, 32.8% from 25 to 44, 24.2% from 45 to 64, and 10.6% who were 65 years of age or older. The median age was 37 years. For every 100 females there were 103.4 males. For every 100 females age 18 and over, there were 100.3 males.

The median income for a household in the township was $52,500, and the median income for a family was $56,181. Males had a median income of $34,583 versus $26,719 for females. The per capita income for the township was $20,230. About 5.8% of families and 6.7% of the population were below the poverty line, including 8.2% of those under age 18 and 15.8% of those age 65 or over.
