= York Springs, Pennsylvania =

Borough in Pennsylvania, US

- Borough
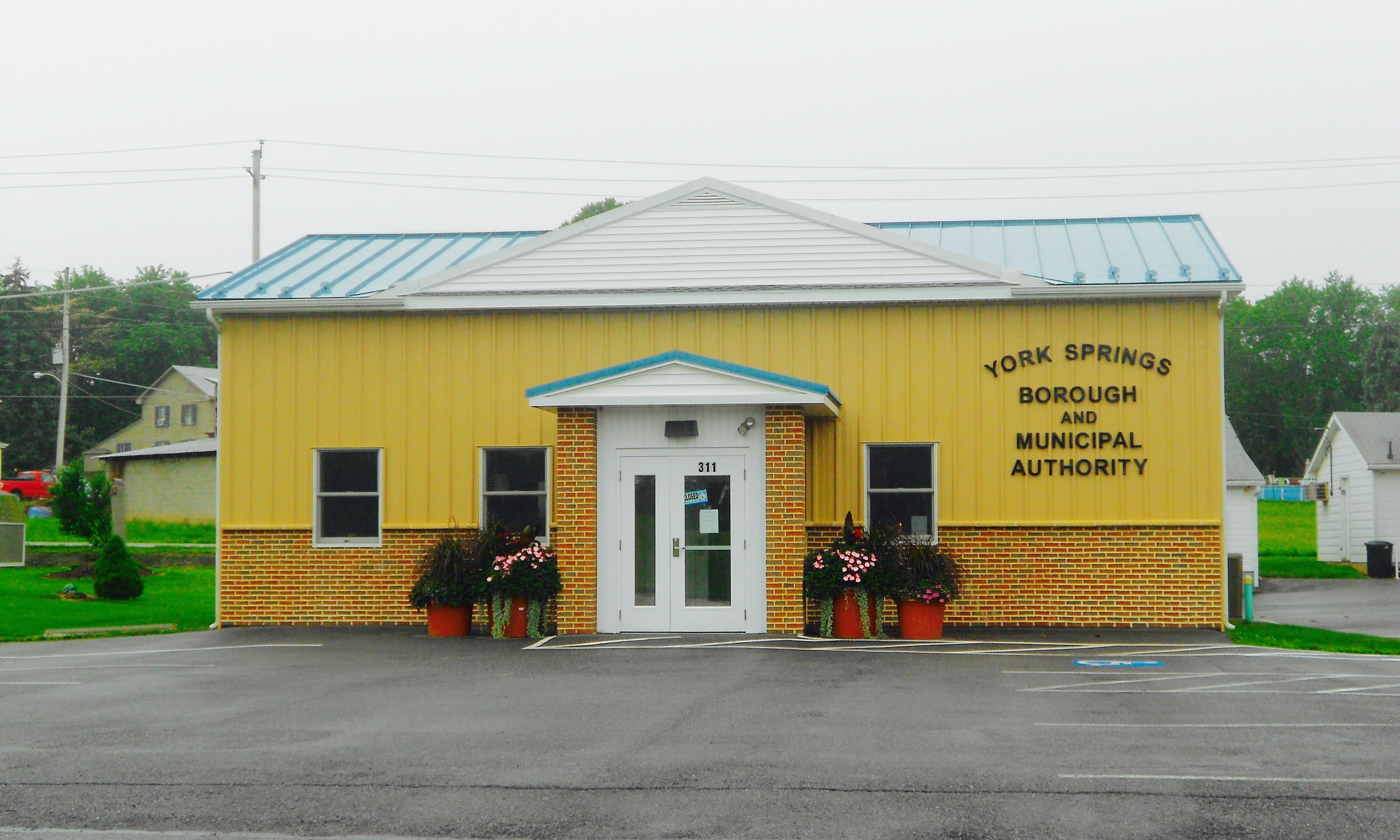
- Municipal Building

- Location in Adams County and the U.S. state of Pennsylvania.

- Location in Pennsylvania and the United States York Springs (the United States)
- Coordinates: 40°0′25″N 77°6′51″W
- Country: United States
- State: Pennsylvania
- County: Adams
- Settled: 1800
- Incorporated: 1868

Government
  - Type: Borough Council
  - Mayor: Nina Tipler

Area
  - Total: 0.20 sq mi (0.52 km^{2})
  - Land: 0.20 sq mi (0.52 km^{2})
  - Water: 0 sq mi (0.00 km^{2})
- Elevation: 650 ft (200 m)

Population (2020)
  - Total: 683
  - Estimate (2019): 776
  - Density: 3,896.7/sq mi (1,504.51/km^{2})
- Time zone: UTC-5 (Eastern (EST))
  - Summer (DST): UTC-4 (EDT)
- Zip Code: 17372
- Area code: 717
- FIPS code: 42-87136
- Website: York Springs Borough

York Springs is a borough in Adams County, Pennsylvania, United States. The population was 683 at the 2020 census. York Springs is served by the Bermudian Springs School District.

== History ==
York Springs was platted as Petersburg within Latimore Township. York Sulphur Springs, the first summer resort in Adams County, was patronized by people from Philadelphia and Baltimore who came to the resort by stage coach. General George Washington and his wife Martha visited the area in the summer of 1799. The water was regarded as medicinal but unpalatable. Analysis claimed 20 parts Epsom salts, 6 parts gypsum, 4 parts common salt, and the balance sulfur. The hotel was destroyed by fire on January 8, 1896. The Springs' popularity decreased with the construction of the railroad and the resort buildings disappeared.

York Springs' previous names were York Sulphur Springs and Petersburg. To completely end confusion with Littlestown, when Petersburg became a borough in 1868 it was named York Sulphur Springs, later shortened to York Springs.

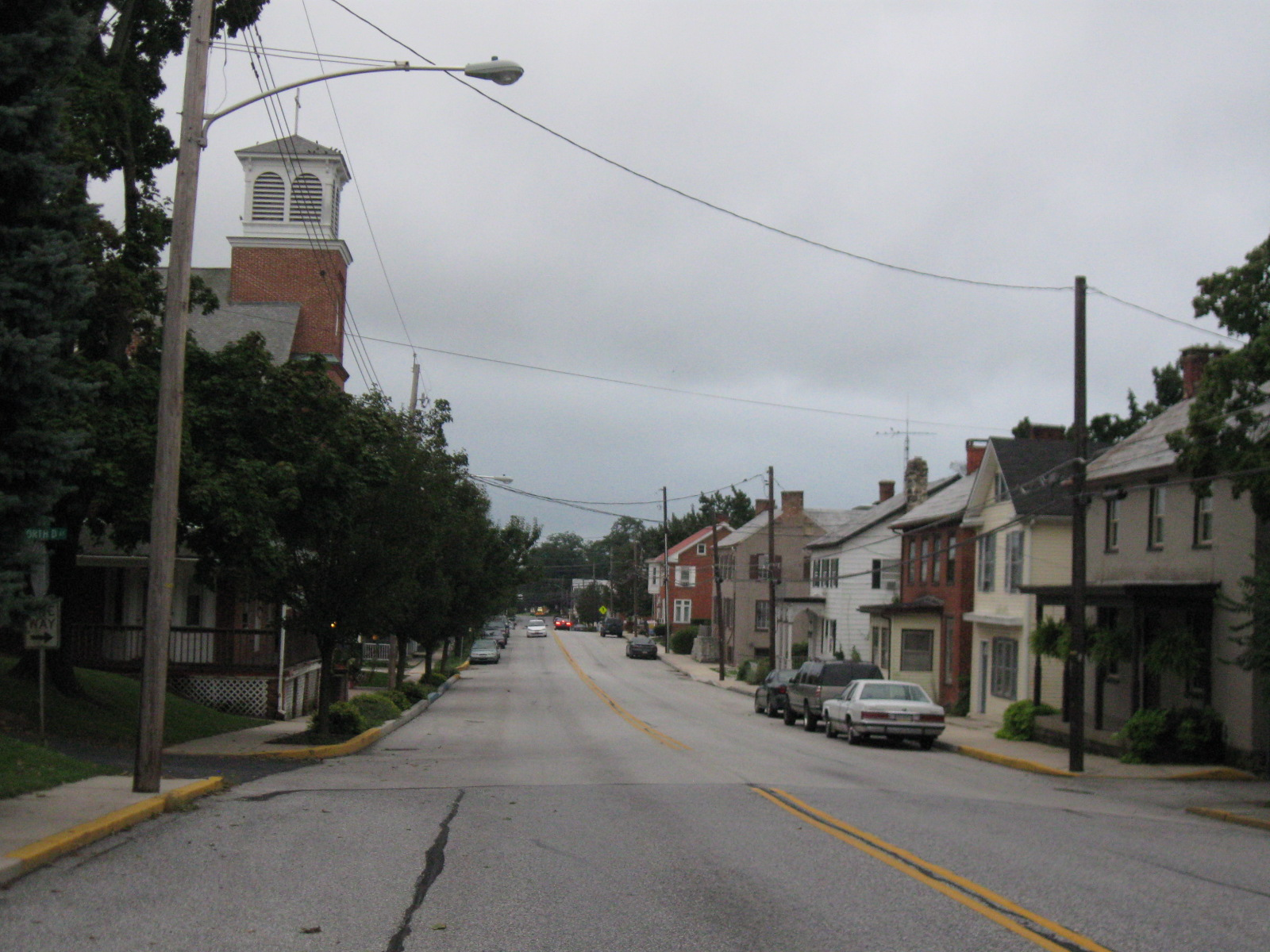
Main Street

== Geography ==
York Springs is located at 40°0′25″N 77°6′51″W (40.006865, -77.114066). Main Street in the borough is Pennsylvania Route 94, which runs north to Mount Holly Springs and south to Hanover. U.S. Route 15 passes just to the southeast of the borough.

According to the U.S. Census Bureau, the borough has a total area of 0.23 square miles (0.6 km^{2}), all land.

The United States Postal ZIP Code is 17372. The local telephone exchange prefix is 528.

== Demographics ==
Historical population
Census	Pop.	Note	%±
1850	356		—
1870	356		—
1880	378		6.2%
1890	340		−10.1%
1900	352		3.5%
1910	209		−40.6%
1920	287		37.3%
1930	318		10.8%
1940	357		12.3%
1950	413		15.7%
1960	384		−7.0%
1970	467		21.6%
1980	556		19.1%
1990	547		−1.6%
2000	574		4.9%
2010	833		45.1%
2020	683		−18.0%

As of the census of 2000, there were 574 people, 186 households, and 129 families residing in the borough. The population density was 2,836.0 people per square mile (1,095.0 people/km^{2}). There were 213 housing units at an average density of 1,052.4 units per square mile (406.3 units/km^{2}). The racial makeup of the borough was 94.77% White, 0.35% African American, 1.22% Asian, 3.31% from other races, and 0.35% from two or more races. Hispanic or Latino people of any race were 24.56% of the population.

There were 186 households, out of which 41.4% had children under the age of 18 living with them, 53.8% were married couples living together, 10.2% had a female householder with no husband present, and 30.6% were non-families. 21.5% of all households were made up of individuals, and 9.1% had someone living alone who was 65 years of age or older. The average household size was 2.87 and the average family size was 3.42.

In the borough the population was spread out, with 28.9% under the age of 18, 9.6% from 18 to 24, 30.5% from 25 to 44, 16.0% from 45 to 64, and 15.0% who were 65 years of age or older. The median age was 30 years. For every 100 females there were 103.5 males. For every 100 females age 18 and over, there were 102.0 males.

The median income for a household in the borough was $41,250, and the median income for a family was $41,071. Males had a median income of $28,173 versus $24,583 for females. The per capita income for the borough was $14,379. About 9.5% of families and 11.0% of the population were below the poverty line, including 14.0% of those under age 18 and 20.0% of those age 65 or over.

== Education ==
It is in the Bermudian Springs School District.

== Notable people ==
- George Deardorff McCreary (1846–1915), U.S. Congressman
- Albert Cook Myers (1874–1960), historian
