= Lazzaro Calamech =

Italian painter

Lazzaro Calamechi or Lazzaro Calamech (born c. 1530) was an Italian painter and sculptor.

He was born in Carrara. Along with his uncle Andrea, they sculpted the stucco statues for the catafalque or Castrum doloris erected for Michelangelo's elaborate funeral in Florence. No further works are known.
