= Huntington Township, Adams County, Pennsylvania =

Township in Pennsylvania, US

Coordinates: 39°59′25″N 77°06′59″W

- Township
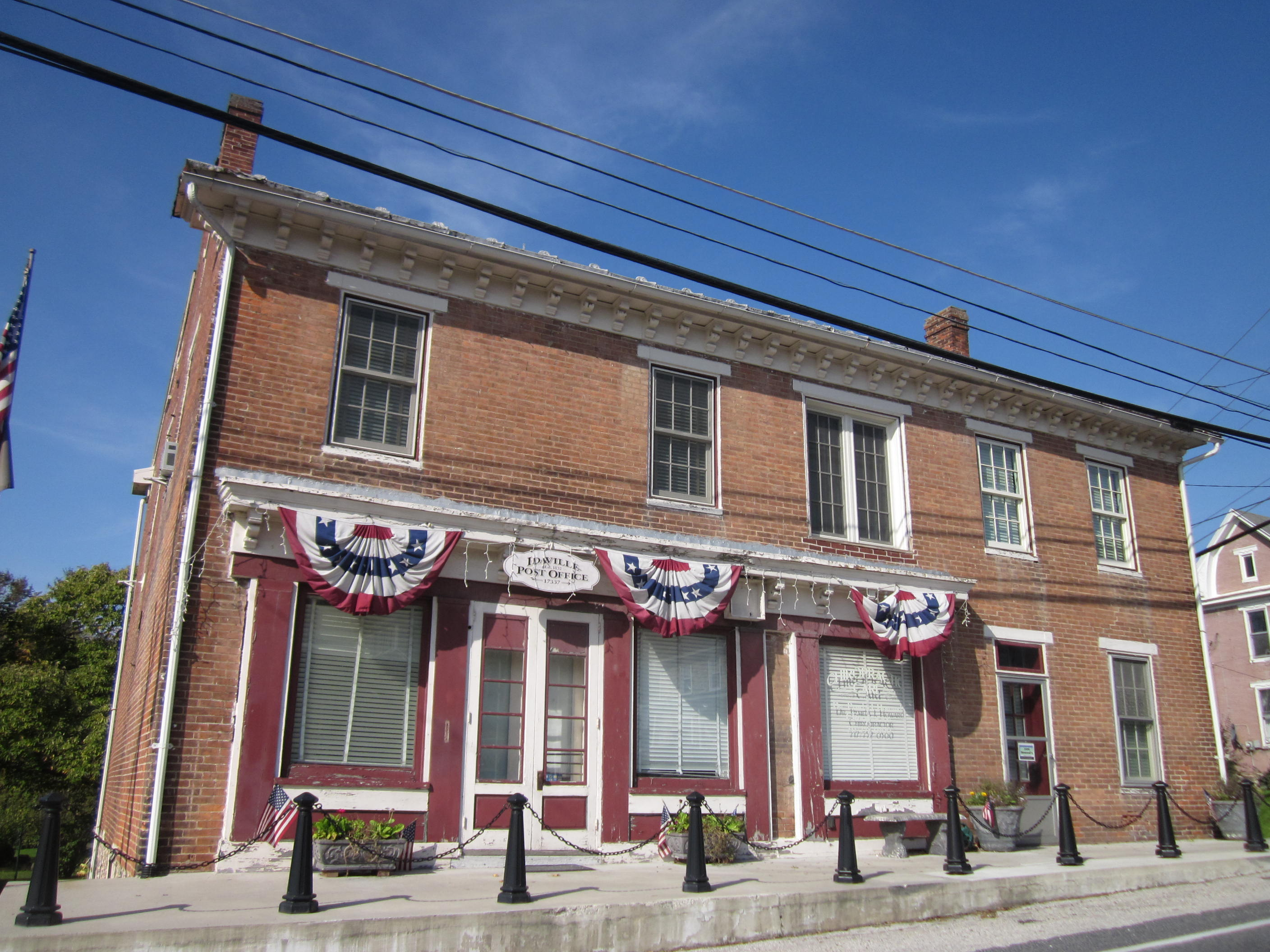
- Idaville is a village in the township

- Seal

- Location in Adams County and the state of Pennsylvania.
- Country: United States
- State: Pennsylvania
- County: Adams
- Settled: 1734
- Incorporated: Before 1800

Area
  - Total: 25.12 sq mi (65.05 km^{2})
  - Land: 25.07 sq mi (64.92 km^{2})
  - Water: 0.050 sq mi (0.13 km^{2})

Population (2020)
  - Total: 2,393
  - Estimate (2023): 2,431
  - Density: 95/sq mi (36.6/km^{2})
- Time zone: UTC-5 (Eastern (EST))
  - Summer (DST): UTC-4 (EDT)
- Area code: 717
- FIPS code: 42-001-36424
- Website: https://huntingtontwp.net/

Huntington Township is a rural township which is located in Adams County, Pennsylvania, United States. The population was 2,369 at the time of the 2010 census.

== History ==
Huntington Township is the oldest township in Adams County. It was founded in 1745. Latimore Township was formed out of Huntington Township in 1807. The Borough of York Springs was separated from Huntington in 1868, and functioned as a business, social and religious center for Huntington for centuries.

Since the Civil War, Huntington Township has been a Republican stronghold due largely to its social conservatism and rural character. Republican candidates for office regularly obtain over 80% of the popular vote in general elections.

== Geography ==
According to the United States Census Bureau, the township has a total area of 25.1 square miles (65.1 km^{2}), of which 25.1 square miles (65.0 km^{2}) is land and 0.039 square miles (0.1 km^{2}), or 0.20%, is water. It contains the census-designated place of Idaville.

== Recreation ==
Portions of the Pennsylvania State Game Lands Number 249 is located in Huntington Township.

== Demographics ==
Historical population
Census	Pop.	Note	%±
2000	2,233		—
2010	2,369		6.1%
2020	2,393		1.0%
2023 (est.)	2,431		1.6%
U.S. Decennial Census

As of the census of 2010, there were 2,369 people, 895 households, and 678 families residing in the township.

The population density was 94.4 inhabitants per square mile (36.4/km^{2}). There were 966 housing units at an average density of 38.5 per square mile (14.9/km^{2}).

The racial makeup of the township was 95.44% White, 0.46% African American, 0.42% Native American, 0.76% Asian, 1.65% some other race, and 1.27% from two or more races. Hispanic or Latino of any race were 5.7% of the population.

There were 895 households, out of which 33.0% had children under the age of eighteen living with them; 64.0% were headed by married couples living together, 6.4% had a female householder with no husband present, and 24.2% were non-families. 18.7% of all households were made up of individuals, and 8.0% were those of someone living alone who was sixty-five years of age or older. The average household size was 2.65, and the average family size was 3.01.

In the township, the population was spread out, with 23.4% under the age of eighteen, 7.3% from eighteen to twenty-four, 24.9% from twenty-five to forty-four, 29.7% from forty-five to sixty-four, and 14.6% who were sixty-five years of age or older. The median age was 41.3 years.

For every one hundred females, there were 101.3 males. For every one hundred females who were aged eighteen or older, there were 102.7 males.

For the period 2007–2011, the estimated median annual income for a household in the township was $53,657, and the median income for a family was $58,846. Males who worked full-time had estimated median salaries of $23,353. Roughly 2.7% of families and 5.4% of the population were living below the poverty line.
