= House of Peers (Kingdom of Sicily) =

The House of Peers, in the Kingdom of Sicily, was one of the two legislative houses of Parliament, from 1812 to 1816 and briefly in 1848; it was a form of peerage based on a model very similar to that of the British Peerage.

== History ==
With the Sicilian Constitution of 1812, the feudal regime was abolished, and legislative power was attributed to the Parliament composed of two chambers, one called the "municipal" (corresponding to the state property branch), electable by census and open vote, and the other of the "peers", with a "perpetual, inalienable and hereditary" office.

The "Chamber of Peers of Sicily" appointed by the king, with a life term, was formed by the major former feudal lords, ecclesiastics and Sicilian military men. Although undoubtedly based on the British institution, its historical origins must be sought in the Sicilian Parliament, the ancient assembly established in the Kingdom of Sicily already in the Norman era. The constitution was conceived during the period of English protectorate on the island which referred to Lord William Bentinck.

Chapter XIX of the constitution established that "every proposal relating to subsidies and taxes must be initiated in the House of Commons. The House of Peers will only have the right to assent or dissent, without being able to make any alteration or modification". The king, who convened the two chambers at least once a year, had the power of veto over the laws of parliament. [ 1 ] With the unification of the Kingdom of Sicily with that of Naples in December 1816, and the consequent birth of the Kingdom of the Two Sicilies, it was effectively suppressed.

With the Sicilian revolution of 1848-49, the subsequent constitution of 10 February 1848 brought about several changes to this assembly institution, first of all excluding from the assembly all those families that relied on titles registered to non-Sicilian families (thus excluding those members of the Neapolitan aristocracy who, through inheritance, had come into possession of a fiefdom "decorated" as a peer). Subsequently, for the peers declared "vacant", the possibility was established that they could become elective through the nomination of a provisional member voted by the Chamber itself.

With the constitutional statute of 10 July 1848, the Sicilian Chamber of Peers was abolished and replaced by the Senate, to which peers could be elected, provided that they signed the declaration of 13 July 1848 which deposed King Ferdinand II.

== Composition ==
=== Kingdom of Sicily (1812-1816) ===
Spiritual peers
| Seat | Holder |
|---|---|
| 1 | Archbishop of Palermo |
| 2 | Archbishop of Messina |
| 3 | Archbishop of Monreale |
| 4 | Bishop of Catania |
| 5 | Bishop of Siracusa |
| 6 | Bishop of Girgenti |
| 7 | Bishop of Patti |
| 8 | Bishop of Cefalù |
| 9 | Bishop of Mazara |
| 10 | Bishop of Lipari |
| 11 | Archimandrite of Messina |
| 12 | Grand Prior of San Giovanni of Messina |
| 13 | Abbot nullius di Santa Lucia |
| 14 | Commander of the Magione di Palermo |
| 15 | Abbot of Santa Maria di Altofonte |
| 16 | Abbot of Santo Spirito |
| 17 | Abbot of Santa Maria di Maniace |
| 18 | Abbot of Sant'Angelo di Brolo |
| 19 | Abbot of San Pietro e Paolo di Itala |
| 20 | Abbot of San Giovanni degli Eremiti |
| 21 | Abbot of Santa Maria la Novara |
| 22 | Abbot of Santa Maria la Grotta in Marsala |
| 23 | Abbot of Santa Maria di Roccamadore |
| 24 | Abbot of San Pietro e Paolo d'Agrò |
| 25 | Abbot of Santa Maria di Gala |
| 26 | Abbot of Santa Maria di Mandanici |
| 27 | Abbot of San Pantaleone in Alcara Li Fusi |
| 28 | Abbot of Santa Maria di Mili |
| 29 | Abbot of San Michele di Troina |
| 30 | Abbot of San Gregorio di Gibiso |
| 31 | Abbot of Santa Maria di Roccadia |
| 32 | Abbot of San Filippo de Grandis |
| 33 | Abbot of San Filippo di Fragalà |
| 34 | Abbot of Santa Maria di Bordonaro |
| 35 | Abbot of San Nicolò del Fico |
| 36 | Priory of Sant'Andrea di Piazza |
| 37 | Priory of Santa Croce di Messina |
| 38 | Abbot of Santo Spirito di Caltanissetta |
| 39 | Abbot of San Nicandro |
| 40 | Abbot of Santa Caterina di Linguaglossa |
| 41 | Abbot of Santa Lucia di Noto |
| 42 | Abbot of Santa Maria di Terrana |
| 43 | Priore dei Benefici di San Matteo della Gloria di Messina |
| 44 | Abbot of Santa Maria delle Giumbarre |
| 45 | Abbot of Santa Maria di Nuovaluce |
| 46 | Abbot of Santa Maria del Piano di Capizzi |
| 47 | Abbot of San Giacomo d'Altopasso di Naro |
| 48 | Abbot of San Martino de Scalis |
| 49 | Abbot of San Placido di Calonerò |
| 50 | Abbot of San Nicolò l'Arena |
| 51 | Preceptor of San Calogero |
| 52 | Priory of Santa Maria la Nova di Monreale |
| 53 | Abbot of Gangi lo Vecchio |
| 54 | Abbot of Santa Maria di Pedaly |
| 55 | Abbot della Santissima Trinità di Castiglione |
| 56 | Abbot of Sant'Anna la Portella |
| 57 | Abbot of Santa Maria dell'Arco |
| 58 | Abbot of Sant'Anastasia |
| 59 | Abbot of the Santissima Trinità di Delia |
| 60 | Abbot of Santa Maria del Fundrò |
| 61 | Abbot of San Filippo di Santa Lucia |

Temporal Peers
| Seat | Title and Fiefdom | Family |
|---|---|---|
| 1 | Prince of Butera | Branciforte |
| 2 | Prince of Castelvetrano | Pignatelli |
| 3 | Prince of Paternò | Moncada |
| 4 | Prince of Castelbuono | Ventimiglia |
| 5 | Prince of Trabia | Lanza |
| 6 | Prince of Castiglione | Rospigliosi |
| 7 | Prince of Villafranca | Alliata |
| 8 | Prince of Paceco | Sanseverino |
| 9 | Prince of Roccafiorita | Bonanno |
| 10 | Prince of Scaletta | Ruffo di Calabria |
| 11 | Prince of Maletto | Spadafora |
| 12 | Prince of Pantelleria | Requesens |
| 13 | Prince of Palazzolo | Ruffo di Calabria |
| 14 | Prince of Leonforte | Branciforte |
| 15 | Prince of Carini | La Grua |
| 16 | Prince of Castelnuovo | Cottone |
| 17 | Prince of Campofranco | Lucchese-Palli |
| 18 | Prince of Aragona | Naselli |
| 19 | Prince of Scordia | Lanza |
| 20 | Prince of Valguarnera | Valguarnera |
| 21 | Prince of Resuttano | Napoli |
| 22 | Prince of Partanna | Grifeo |
| 23 | Prince of Malvagna | Migliaccio |
| 24 | Prince of Calvaruso | Trigona |
| 25 | Prince of Monforte | Moncada |
| 26 | Prince of Palagonia | Gravina |
| 27 | Prince of Cassaro | Statella |
| 28 | Prince of Biscari | Paternò Castello |
| 29 | Prince of Mezzojuso | Corvino |
| 30 | Prince of Montevago | Gravina |
| 31 | Prince of Mirto | Filangeri |
| 32 | Prince of Galati | De Spucches |
| 33 | Prince of Raffadali | Montaperto |
| 34 | Prince of Militello | Gallego |
| 35 | Prince of Cerami | Rosso |
| 36 | Prince of Campofiorito | Reggio |
| 37 | Prince of Aci Santi Antonio e Filippo | Reggio |
| 38 | Prince of Sciara | Notarbartolo |
| 39 | Prince of Sant'Antonino | Bonanno |
| 40 | Prince of Comitini | Gravina |
| 41 | Prince of Furnari | Marziani |
| 42 | Prince of Rosolini | Platamone |
| 43 | Prince of Spadafora | Spadafora |
| 44 | Prince of Ramacca | Gravina |
| 45 | Prince of San Teodoro | Brunaccini |
| 46 | Prince of Belmonte | Ventimiglia |
| 47 | Prince of Ficarazzi | Giardina |
| 48 | Prince of Mola | Villadicani |
| 49 | Prince of Camporeale | Beccadelli di Bologna |
| 50 | Prince of Castelforte | Gravina |
| 51 | Duke of Bivona | Alvarez de Toledo |
| 52 | Duke of Castrofilippo | Monreale |
| 53 | Duke of Palma | Tomasi |
| 54 | Duke of Reitano | Colonna |
| 55 | Duke of Montagnareale | Viannisi |
| 56 | Duke of Piraino | Denti |
| 57 | Duke of Serradifalco | Lo Faso |
| 58 | Duke of Sperlinga | Oneto |
| 59 | Duke of Gualtieri | Avarna |
| 60 | Duke of Misterbianco | Trigona |
| 61 | Duke of Cesarò | Colonna |
| 62 | Duke of Carcaci | Paternò Castello |
| 63 | Duke of Castelluccio | Agraz |
| 64 | Duke of Acquaviva | Oliveri |
| 65 | Duke of Villarosa | Notarbartolo |
| 66 | Duke of Sorrentino | Landolina |
| 67 | Duke of Vatticani | Termine |
| 68 | Duke of Bronte | Nelson |
| 69 | Marquess of Marineo | Pilo |
| 70 | Marquess of Giarratana | Settimo |
| 71 | Marquess of Sambuca | Beccadelli di Bologna |
| 72 | Marquess of Montemaggiore | Licata |
| 73 | Marquess of Santa Croce | Celeste |
| 74 | Marquess of Sortino | Specchi Gaetani |
| 75 | Marquess of Motta d'Affermo | Castelli |
| 76 | Marquess of Tortorici | Mastrilli |
| 77 | Marquess of Roccalumera | Ardoino |
| 78 | Marquess of San Cataldo | Galletti |
| 79 | Marquess of Ogliastro | Parisio |
| 80 | Marquess of Lucca | Filangeri |
| 81 | Marquess of Capizzi | Paternò Castello |
| 82 | Marquess of Mongiuffi Melia | Corvaja |
| 83 | Marquess of Camporotondo | Natoli |
| 84 | Marquess of Alimena | Fatta del Bosco |
| 85 | Marquess of Murata | Santostefano |
| 86 | Marquess of Bagni | Daniele |
| 87 | Marquess of San Ferdinando | Rostagni |
| 88 | Marquess of Manchi di Bilici | Paternò di Raddusa |
| 89 | Count of Modica | FitzJames Stuart |
| 90 | Count of Naso | Joppolo |
| 91 | Baron of Ficarra | Musto |
| 92 | Baron of Castania | Galletti |
| 93 | Baron of Santo Stefano di Mistretta | Trigona |
| 94 | Baron of Tripi | Cesareo |
| 95 | Baron of Longi | Napoli |
| 96 | Baron of Pettineo | Paternò |
| 97 | Baron of Prizzi | Calafato |
| 98 | Baron of Martini | Palermo |
| 99 | Baron of Rocca | Valdina |
| 100 | Baron of Godrano | Marziani |
| 101 | Baron of Casalnuovo | Di Maria |
| 102 | Baron of Vita | Sicomo |
| 103 | Baron of Tusa | La Torre |
| 104 | Baron of San Carlo | Filangeri |
| 105 | Baron of Vallelunga | Papè |
| 106 | Baron of Gaggi | De Spucches |
| 107 | Baron of Baucina | Calderone |
| 108 | Baron of Ferla | Tarallo |
| 109 | Baron of Gallidoro | Vigo |
| 110 | Baron of Riesi | Pignatelli |
| 111 | Baron of Villadoro | D'Onofrio |
| 112 | Baron of Campobello | San Martino Pardo |
| 113 | Baron of Malinventre | Reggio |
| 114 | Baron of Villasmundo | Asmundo Paternò |
| 115 | Baron of Castelnormando | Lucchese-Palli |
| 116 | Baron of Giardinello | Valguarnera |
| 117 | Baron of Pachino | Starabba |
| 118 | Baron of San Pietro | Clarenza |
| 119 | Baron of Aliminusa | Milone |
| 120 | Baron of Villalba | Palmeri |
| 121 | Baron of San Cono | Trigona |
| 122 | Baron of Burgio | De Michele |
| 123 | Baron of Santo Stefano di Briga | De Spucches |
| 124 | Baron of Belvedere | Bonanno |
| 125 | Baron of Caruso | |

=== Kingdom of Sicily (1848-1849) ===
Spiritual peers
| Seat | Title |
|---|---|
| 1 | Archbishop of Messina |
| 2 | Archbishop of Monreale |
| 3 | Bishop of Girgenti |
| 4 | Bishop of Patti |
| 5 | Bishop of Cefalù |
| 6 | Bishop of Caltagirone |
| 7 | Bishop of Piazza |
| 8 | Abbot of Santo Spirito |
| 9 | Abbot of Santa Maria di Maniace |
| 10 | Abbot of San Giovanni degli Eremiti |
| 11 | Abbot of Santa Maria la Grotta |
| 12 | Abbot of Santa Maria di Gala |
| 13 | Abbot of Santa Lucia |
| 14 | Abbot of Santa Maria di Mili |
| 15 | Abbot of San Giorgio lo Gibiso |
| 16 | Abbot of San Filippo di Fragalà |
| 17 | Abbot of San Nicandro |
| 18 | Abbot of Santa Maria di Terrana |
| 19 | Abbot of San Martino de Scalis |
| 20 | Abbot of San Placido di Messina |
| 21 | Abbot of San Nicolò l'Arena |
| 22 | Priory of Santa Maria la Nuova di Monreale |
| 23 | Abbot of Gangi lo Vecchio |
| 24 | Abbot of Santa Maria la Portella |
| 25 | Abbot of Santa Maria del Fundrò |

Temporal Peers
| Seat | Title and Fiefdom | Family |
|---|---|---|
| 1 | Prince of Butera | Lanza Branciforte |
| 2 | Prince of Castelvetrano | Pignatelli |
| 3 | Prince of Paternò | Moncada |
| 4 | Prince of Castelbuono | Ventimiglia |
| 5 | Prince of Trabia | Lanza Branciforte |
| 6 | Prince of Villafranca | Alliata |
| 7 | Prince of Roccafiorita | Bonanno |
| 8 | Prince of Maletto | Spadafora |
| 9 | Prince of Pantelleria | Requesens |
| 10 | Prince of Leonforte | Branciforte |
| 11 | Prince of Carini | La Grua |
| 12 | Prince of Campofranco | Lucchese-Palli |
| 13 | Prince of Aragona | Naselli |
| 14 | Prince of Scordia | Lanza Branciforte |
| 15 | Prince of Valguarnera | Valguarnera |
| 16 | Prince of Resuttano | Napoli |
| 17 | Prince of Partanna | Grifeo |
| 18 | Prince of Malvagna | Migliaccio |
| 19 | Prince of Palagonia | Gravina |
| 20 | Prince of Cassaro | Statella |
| 21 | Prince of Montevago | Gravina |
| 22 | Prince of Mirto | Filangeri |
| 23 | Prince of Galati | De Spucches |
| 24 | Prince of Raffadali | Montaperto |
| 25 | Prince of Militello | Starabba |
| 26 | Prince of Cerami | Asmundo Rosso |
| 27 | Prince of Aci Santi Antonio e Filippo | Reggio |
| 28 | Prince of Sciara | Notarbartolo |
| 29 | Prince of Comitini | Gravina |
| 30 | Prince of Furnari | Marziani |
| 31 | Prince of Spadafora | Spadafora |
| 32 | Prince of Ramacca | Gravina |
| 33 | Prince of San Teodoro | Brunaccini |
| 34 | Prince of Ficarazzi | Giardina |
| 35 | Prince of Camporeale | Beccadelli di Bologna |
| 36 | Duke of Castrofilippo | Monreale |
| 37 | Duke of Palma | Tomasi |
| 38 | Duke of Piraino | Denti |
| 39 | Duke of Serradifalco | Lo Faso |
| 40 | Duke of Sperlinga | Oneto |
| 41 | Duke of Gualtieri | Avarna |
| 42 | Duke of Cesarò | Colonna |
| 43 | Duke of Castelluccio | Agraz |
| 44 | Duke of Acquaviva | Oliveri |
| 45 | Duke of Villarosa | Notarbartolo |
| 46 | Duke of Sorrentino | Landolina |
| 47 | Marquess of Marineo | Pilo |
| 48 | Marquess of Giarratana | Settimo |
| 49 | Marquess of Sambuca | Beccadelli di Bologna |
| 50 | Marquess of Montemaggiore | Termine |
| 51 | Marquess of Santa Croce | Celeste |
| 52 | Marquess of Motta | Castelli |
| 53 | Marquess of Tortorici | Mastrilli |
| 54 | Marquess of San Cataldo | Galletti |
| 55 | Marquess of Lucca | Filangeri |
| 56 | Marquess of Capizzi | Paternò Castello |
| 57 | Marquess of Camporotondo | Lucchese-Palli |
| 58 | Marquess of Alimena | Bosco |
| 59 | Marquess of Murata | Santostefano |
| 60 | Marquess of Bagni | Daniele |
| 61 | Marquess of San Ferdinando | Rostagni |
| 62 | Marquess of Manchi di Bilici | Paternò di Raddusa |
| 63 | Baron of Ficarra | Abbate |
| 64 | Baron of Castania | Galletti |
| 65 | Baron of Santo Stefano di Mistretta | Trigona |
| 66 | Baron of Tripi | Paratore |
| 67 | Baron of Pettineo | Platamone |
| 68 | Baron of Martini | Palermo |
| 69 | Baron of Rocca | Valdina |
| 70 | Baron of Godrano | Cottù Marziani |
| 71 | Baron of Tusa | La Torre |
| 72 | Baron of Vallelunga | Papè |
| 73 | Baron of Gaggi | De Spucches |
| 74 | Baron of Baucina | Calderone |
| 75 | Baron of Ferla | Tarallo |
| 76 | Baron of Gallidoro | Vigo |
| 77 | Baron of Campobello | San Martino Pardo |
| 78 | Baron of Malinventre | Reggio |
| 79 | Baron of Castelnormanno | Lucchese-Palli |
| 80 | Baron of Giardinello | Valguarnera |
| 81 | Baron of Pachino | Starabba |
| 82 | Baron of Aliminusa | Milone |
| 83 | Baron of Villalba | Palmeri |
| 84 | Baron of San Cono | Trigona |
| 85 | Baron of Villaura | De Michele |
| 86 | Baron of Belvedere | Bonanno |

== See also ==
- Sicilian Parliament
- Kingdom of Sicily

== Bibliography ==
- Brancato, F. L'Assemblea Siciliana del 1848-1849. Firenze 1946.
- Calisse, C. Storia del Parlamento in Sicilia dalla Fondazione alla Caduta della Monarchia. Torino 1887.
- Castelli di Torremuzza, V. "Fasti di Sicilia". Messina 1820
- Genuardi, L. Il Parlamento Siciliano. Bologna 1924.
- Maresca della Salandra, G. I Pari temporali del 1848, con alcuni riferimenti agli antichi parlamenti di Napoli e Sicilia, in "Rivista Araldica", Anno LVV-1957, pagg. 405-417, Roma, 1957
- Marongiu, Antonio. Il Parlamento in Italia. Milano 1962.
- Blasonario dei Pari del Regno delle Due Sicilie (1848-1849). Vol. anno CXVIII. Rivista del Collegio Araldico. 2021. pp. 18–99.
