= Galfetti =

Galfetti is a surname.

== List of people with the surname ==
- Aurelio Galfetti (1936–2021), Swiss architect
- Gina Galfetti, American politician
- Manuel Carlos Valls Galfetti, French-Spanish politician

== See also ==
- Galetti
- Galletti
