= Henry II of Ventimiglia =

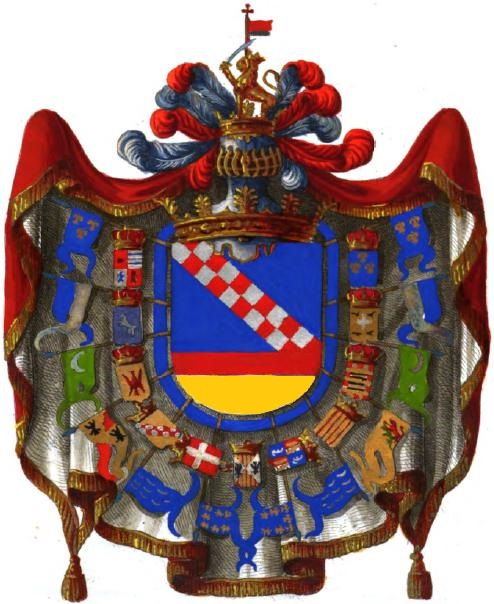
The Ventimiglia heraldic shield, red with a gold chief, with the addition of the coats of arms of the Altavilla Kings of Sicily, for the marriage of Henry II to Isabella, Countess of Geraci.

Henry II of Ventimiglia (c. 1230 – 1308), Count of Ventimiglia, of Maro, Geraci and of Ischia, Lord of Collesano, Gangi and of Petralie, Lord of Gratteri, Isnello, Castel di Lucio, Ipsigro, Fisauli, Belici, Montemaggiore and Caronia, was Vicar General in Marche and the Duchy of Spoleto, on behalf of King Manfred of Sicily, and one of the main organizers of the Sicilian Vespers.

Henry was also the founder of Castelbuono and began the construction of the castle there. Expropriated from the fiefs both in Sicily and in Liguria by Charles I of Anjou, he obtained recognition and restitution with the support of Frederick III of Aragon and the Republic of Genoa. He was ambassador of the Aragonese of Sicily to Genoa in 1300.

== Early life ==
Enrico was the son of Count Filippo di Ventimiglia and Aldisia da Manzano, Lady of Carrù.

Around 1255 Henry II, together with his cousins Otto V, Umberto and Manfredi, entered the service of King Manfred of Sicily in the Sicilian lands. The events surrounding Henry's settlement in Sicily and in the County of Geraci are unknown. On 26 June 1258, Manfred, ordered Andrea di Riccardo and the justiciar Scornavacca di Castagna, officials of the Citra-Salso Province, to assign to his blood relative and relative Henry of Ventimiglia the lands, income and men of the two Petralia (Petralia Soprana and Petralia Sottana). That is, two populous fortified villages in the Madonie, already members of the County of Collesano, and themselves the seat of a committee. But only three years later is there news of Henry with the 'Sicilian' title of Count of Ischia.

== Career ==
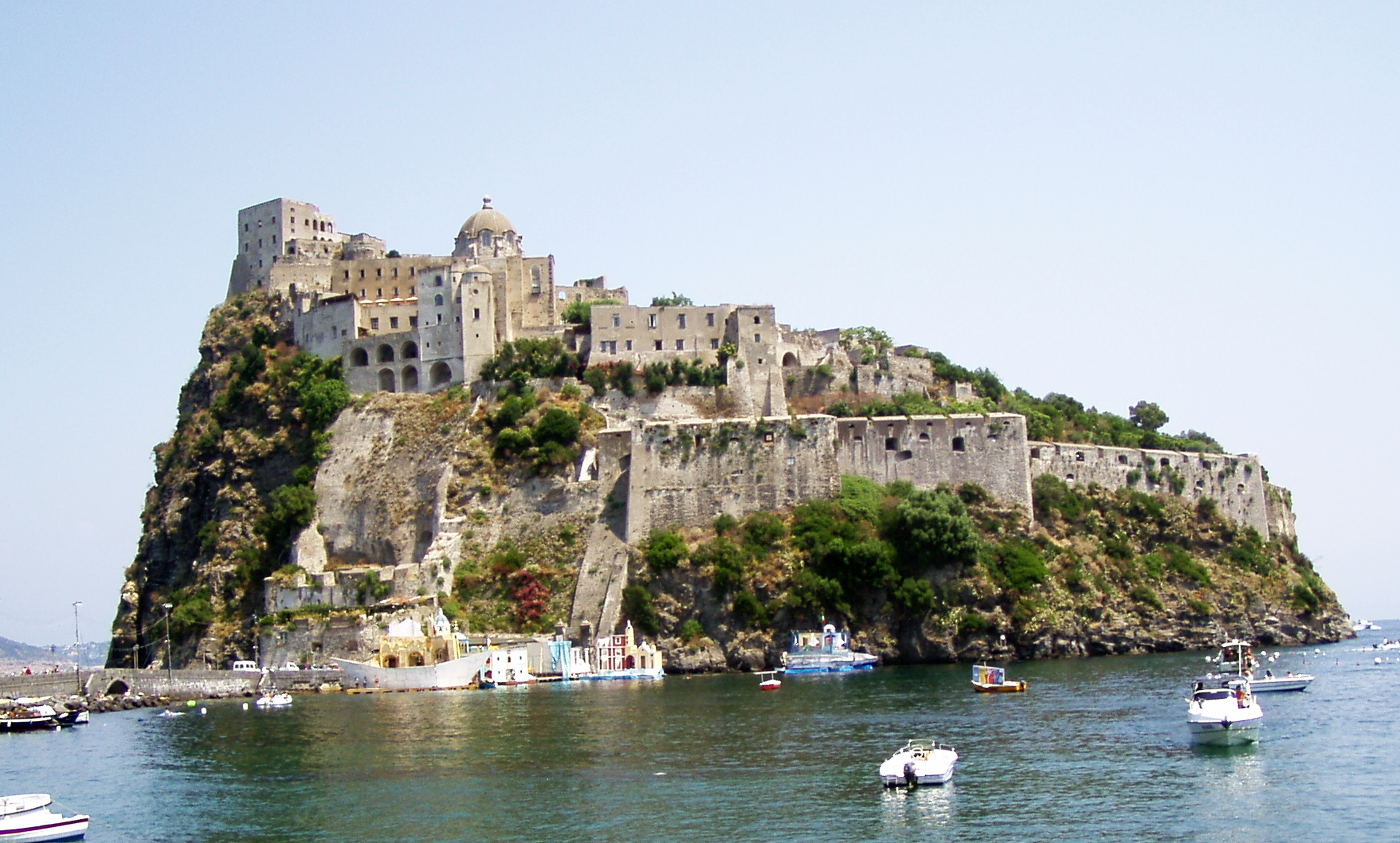
The Aragonese Castle of Girone, an islet adjacent to Ischia Maggiore. The County of Ischia was inherited by Henry II in the second half of the 13th century through his marriage to Isabella, Countess of Geraci and Ischia.

Henry II made his fortune in Sicily, so much so that he lent three hundred lire to his father Filippo I, who in exchange pledged him the castle and the income from the castellany and jurisdiction of Conio, until the loan was covered. Two years later Henry returned home to Albenga, where the ratification of the transfer of Maro and Prelà was recorded by his third cousin Manfredi. In c. 1260, Otto V Ventimiglia "del Bosco", son of Raimondo, cousin of Henry II, married the heiress Giovanna Abate, and settled in Trapani, where he gave birth to another branch of the family – that of the del Bosco – Counts of Alcamo in the 14th century, and then Princes of Cattolica, Dukes of Misilmeri, etc.

Also in 1263, Henry was able to finance the restoration of the Norman Cefalù Cathedral, where his tomb is located. Henry, in addition to the ceiling of the cathedral, had the upper part of the facade of the building completed, in the Ligurian style. On 18 December 1270, King Charles I of Anjou ordered Giovanni de Mesnil to investigate the tax imposition ordered in the indicative year 1263-64 by Count Henry of Ventimiglia. The document denotes, at that date, the full administrative power of the Ventimiglias in the cCounty of Geraci, where they seem to have carried out, as titular vassals of the county, a function, that of collecting the collection, typical of the provincial justiciar. In a document dated 4 May 1278, Henry II of Ventimiglia, Count of Ischia, is defined by Charles of Anjou - for the first time in known documentation - "comitis Giracii olim tempore".

=== Vicar General in the Marches of Ancona and Duchy of Spoleto ===
Henry's presence in Marche, as Vicar General of the King of Sicily, is attested for the first time on 17 March 1260, when the Count of Ischia summoned several debtors who had to pay the due taxes to the Imperial Curia of the Marche – occupied by Manfred, King of Sicily and recognized leader of the Italian Ghibellines - The policy of the Vicar of the Marche and Duchy of Spoleto, in constant friction with the papal and Guelph powers, had to be aggressive in order to guarantee the security of the borders of the Kingdom of Sicily. Henry's political objectives were aimed above all at consolidating the northern border of the territories of Ghibelline influence - a border that passed approximately from Recanati to Matelica - strengthening the league with the Swabian partisans in the nobility and in the municipalities, as well as guaranteeing the lines of connection with the Tuscan and Lombard allies. Very important, to this end, was maintaining and strengthening the Ghibelline league between the municipalities of San Severino Marche, Monte Milone, Tolentino and Matelica, concluded for the first time in 1259, at the time of his predecessor in the office of vicar; the well-known poet and man-at-arms Percivalle Doria. A series of acts followed which marked Henry's commitment in his functions as vicar general at the head of the local Ghibelline party.

== Personal life ==
Henry was married to Countess Isabella of Geraci (1226–1266), the daughter of Aldoino, Count of Ischia and Geraci, and Isabella Cicala. Together, they were the parents of:

- Aldoino Ventimiglia (d. 1289), who co-reigned with his father as Count of Ischia and Geraci; he married Giacoma Filangeri, and died at sea in 1289 returning to Sicily from Gaeta.
- Henry III Ventimiglia (1245–1300), who married Jacona Ventimiglia.
- Pietruccio "Pietro" Ventimiglia (d. c. 1266), who died unmarried.
- Guglielmo Ventimiglia (d. 1341), who became 1st Baron of Buscemi; he married Leonora.

The Count died in 1308.

=== Descendants ===
Through his son Aldoino, he was a grandfather of Francesco I Ventimiglia (1285–1338), who succeeded him as Count of Geraci in 1308.

Through his son Guglielmo, he was a grandfather of Henry Ventimiglia, 2nd Baron of Buscemi (c. 1320–1370).
