= Marquess of Geraci =

The following is a chronological list of the Counts and Marquesses of the County of Geraci, from the Norman Conquest to the suppression of the feudal orders in 1816.

== Counts of Geraci ==
According to tradition, the County of Geraci originates from the Battle of Cerami, which saw King Roger I of Sicily cede the city and fiefdom of Geraci to Roger's nephew, Serlo II of Hauteville, in 1063.

=== Hauteville dyanasty ===
Image	Name	Birth	Death	Period (from-to)	Relationship with predecessor
	Serlo II of Hauteville	c. 1040	1072	1063–1072	
	Aldruda di Moulins	Before 1072	?	1072–?	Wife

=== Craon dynasty ===
Serlo II's widow, Aldruda di Moulins, married the Norman soldier Ingelmarius as her second husband, passing the title of Count of Geraci to him. Ingelmarius eventually rebelled against King Roger I, was stripped of his title and fiefdom and the County passed to the dynasty closest to Serlo. Roger I de Craon, Count of Ischia and Geraci, son of Guglielmo de Craon and father of Guerrera de Craon, appears in a document from 1159. The latter inherited the title of Countess and passed the County to her husband. The sources indicate two hypotheses: Guerrera's marriage to Aldoino of Candida or to Elia d'Hauteville of Gesualdo, both already Barons of Candida and Lapio.

Image	Name	Birth	Death	Period (from-to)	Relationship with predecessor
	Roger I de Craon	Before 1159	?	?–?	?
	Guerrera de Craon	Before 1195	?	c. 1195–?	Daughter
	Aldoino of Candida	?	?	?–?	Husband?

=== Count of Ischia and Geraci (?–1258) ===
Some sources speak of a Roger, son of Elia d'Hauteville of Gesualdo, who in turn married (for the second time) to Guerrera, appointed Count of Ischia by Henry VI, exiled in 1212 perhaps because he rebelled against King Frederick between 1209 and 1211, as can be seen in a letter from the Abbot of Monte Cassino. Roger II of Ischia and Isabella di Parisio were the parents of Aldoino of Ischia. The last Countess was Aldoino's daughter, Isabella of Geraci, who married Henry II of Ventimiglia, introducing the long-lived dynasty of Ligurian origin in the County. However, between the death of Count Aldoino (which occurred before 1240) and the passage of the title to his daughter, the presence of chamberlains appointed by the emperor is documented.

Image	Name	Birth	Death	Period (from-to)	Relationship with predecessor
	Elia d'Hauteville of Gesualdo ?	?	Before May 1206	?–?	Husband of Guerrera?
	Roger II of Ischia	?	Before 1222	?–?	Son
	Aldoino of Ischia	?	Before 1240	?–?	Son
	Isabella of Geraci	?	?	?–?	Daughter

=== Ventimiglia dynasty (1258–1338) ===
The Ventimiglia dynasty, whose first Count of Geraci was Henry II, became the most powerful in the County, elevating it to a Marquessate in 1436. During the long War of the Vespers and the subsequent political instability of the Kingdom, the County was incorporated into the Girgenti valley and experienced a brief period of exclusion of the Ventimiglia family from the fiefdom following an act of rebellion against the crown. In 1271, Charles I of Anjou expropriated the County from Henry and entrusted it to Simon and John de Montfort-Leicester, his cousins, who however did not keep it for long, selling it or giving it to other French vassals. In 1282, King Peter I confirmed Henry as Count of Geraci again, who would co-regency with his son Aldoino. In 1285, Girgenti valley, the County of Geracim and the parts of Termini and Cefalù were created and, in 1289, Henry, finding himself in Liguria, returned to his old fiefdom on the occasion of the funeral of his son, who had died that year; in 1292 he managed to regain the title of Count which he would maintain until his death in 1308. In the first half of the 14th century, Peter II confiscated the County of Geraci from Francesco I Ventimiglia, after a military siege. The County was incorporated into the possessions of the Crown of Aragon for a long time and was only redeemed by Emanuele Ventimiglia in 1354.

Image	Name	Birth	Death	Period (from-to)	Relationship with predecessor
	Henry II of Ventimiglia	c. 1230	1308	1258–1271	Husband
	Simon de Montfort-Leicester	?	?	1271	None
	John de Montfort-Leicester	?	?	1271	Brother
	Aldoino Ventimiglia (together with his father Henry II)	?	1289	1282–1285	None (Son of Henry II)
	Henry II Ventimiglia	c. 1230	1308	1292–1308	Father
	Francesco I Ventimiglia	?	1338	c. 1311–1338	Grandchild

=== Royal Aragon dynasty (1338–1354) ===
The county confiscated from the Ventimiglia family was granted to Elizabeth of Carinthia, Queen of Sicily, remaining in the royal chamber until at least July 1348. Part of the fiefdom was granted to Matteo Palizzi, already husband of the cousin of Francis I, while Damiano Palizzi, brother of Matteo, obtained Collesano and Gratteri. In 1340 the counties passed to the vicar Giovanni d'Aragona who in 1344 sold them to the soldier Giovanni Lombardo. Two years later Pietro Siragusa appeared as Count of Geraci. Finally, upon the death of the Queen around 1350, the County of Geraci was assigned to the infant Giovanni "John" of Aragon, and upon his death, around 1352, to his brother Frederick.

Image	Name	Birth	Death	Period (from-to)	Relationship with predecessor
	Elizabeth of Carinthia	1303	c. 1352	c. 1330–1348	None
	Matteo Palizzi	?	1353	?–1340	None
	Damiano Palizzi	?	?	?–1340	Brother
	John of Aragon	1317	1348	1340–1344	None (Brother-in-law of Elizabeth)
	Giovanni Lombardo	?	?	1344–1346	None
	Pietro Siragusa	?	?	1346	None
	John of Aragon	1340	1353	1346–1352	None (Son of Elizabeth)
	Frederick IV of Sicily	1341	1377	1352–1354	Brother

=== Ventimiglia dynasty (1353–1436) ===
The County was redeemed by Emanuele Ventimiglia in 1353 who obtained the fiefdom again, although the previous year Emanuele and his brother Francesco II, both sons of Francesco I, had already regained possession of their father's assets. Their County would last until his nephew Giovanni I Ventimiglia, who would obtain the elevation of the County to Marquessate.

Image	Name	Birth	Death	Period (from-to)	Relationship with predecessor
	Emanuele Ventimiglia	?	Before 1365	1353–1361	None (Son of Francesco I Ventimiglia)
	Francesco II Ventimiglia	?	1387	1361–1387	He dismisses his brother Emanuele and grants him an annual income of 100 gold ounces
	Henry III Ventimiglia	?	1398	1387–1398	Son
	Giovanni I Ventimiglia	1383	1475	1398–1436	Son

== Marquesses of Geraci ==
In 1436 Giovanni obtained the elevation of the County to a Marquessate. The Marquessate of Geraci existed until 1816, when, as a result of the Sicilian Constitution of 1812, feudalism was abolished. For the four centuries of the marquessate, the ruling family remained that of the Ventimiglias. For five years, from 1485 to 1490, the Count of Geraci - at the time Henry IV - was exiled on charges of rebellion, with his father still in exile, it was his son Filippo who redeemed the County. The last Count of Geraci was Luigi Roger II Ventimiglia.

Image	Name	Birth	Death	Period (from-to)	Relationship with predecessor
	Giovanni I Ventimiglia	1383	1475	1436–1475	–
	Antonio Ventimiglia Prades	c. 1405	1480	1475–1480	Son
	Henry IV Ventimiglia	?	1493	1480–1485	Son
	Filippo Ventimiglia	?	?	1490–?	Son
	Simone I Ventimiglia	?	1544	?–1544	Son
	Giovanni II Ventimiglia	?	1553	1544–1553	Son
	Simone II Ventimiglia	1528	1560	1553–1560	Son
	Maria Ventimiglia e Alliata	1539	1585	1560–?	Wife
	Giovanni III Ventimiglia	1559	1619	?–1619	Son
	Giuseppe Ventimiglia	?	1620	1620 (died before investiture)	Son
	Francesco III Ventimiglia	?	1648	1620–1648	Son
	Giovanni IV Ventimiglia	?	1675	1648–1675	Son
	Francesco IV Rodrigo Ventimiglia	?	1688	1676–1688	Son
	Giovanni V Ventimiglia	1680	1689	1688–1689	Son
	Blasco Ventimiglia	?	?	1689–1712	Brother
	Giovanni VI Ventimiglia	?	1748	1712–1748	Brother
	Luigi Roger Ventimiglia	1705	1771	1749–1771	Son
	Luigi Roger II Ventimiglia	?	?	1771–1816	Son
