= International FJ =

Sailboat class

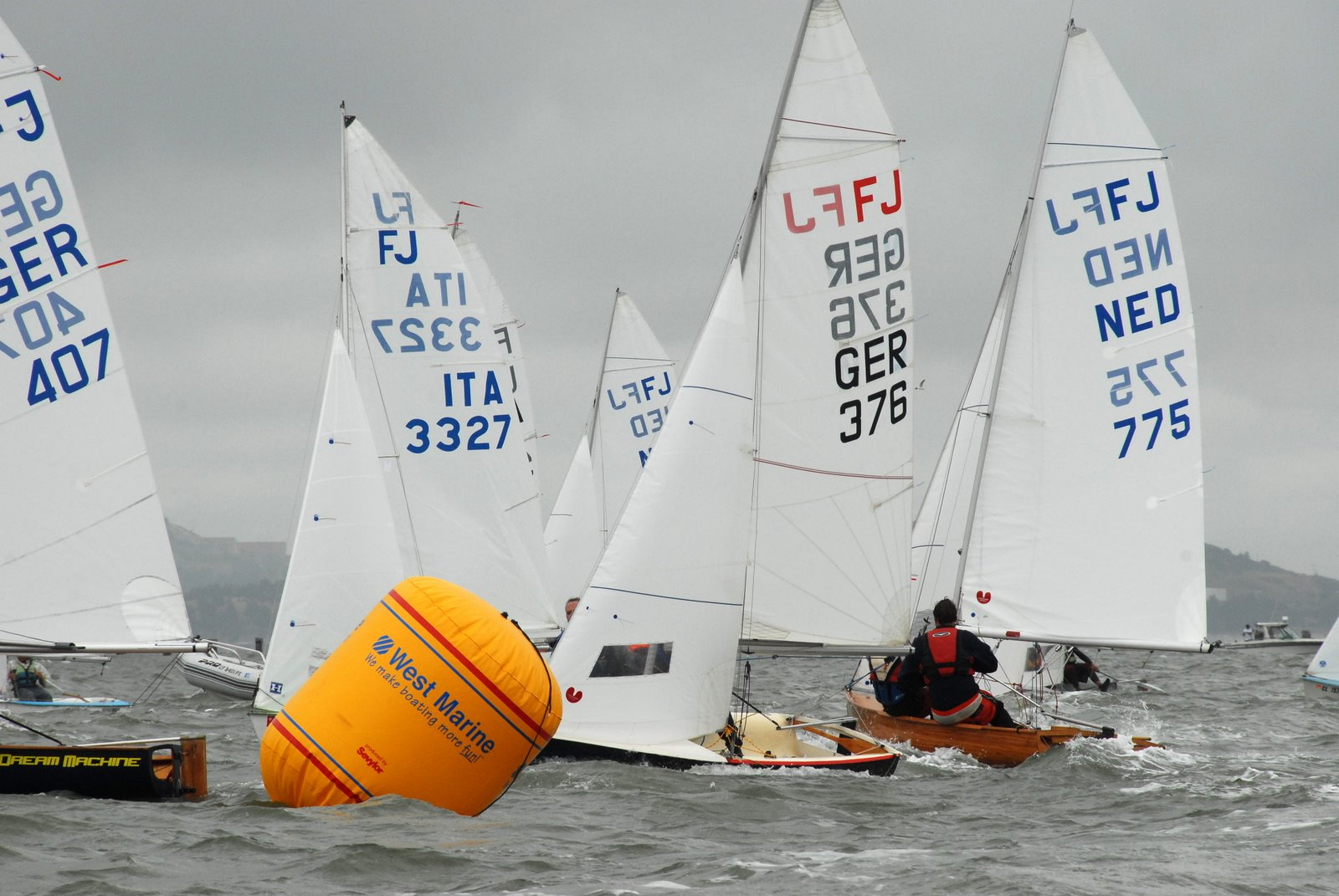
- International FJ start at the 2007 World Championships in San Francisco Bay

Development
- Designer: Uus Van Essen and Conrad Gülcher
- Location: Netherlands
- Year: 1956
- No. built: 4600
- Builders: Pim van der Brink; Van Doesburg; Dusseldorp; Van Wettum; Perry Lengton; Galetti; Radenksy; Vanguard Sailboats; Grampian Marine; Paceship Yachts; Chantier Naval Costantini; Alpa Yachts; Centro Nautico Adriatico; Comar Yachts; Nautivela; Advance Sailboat Corp; W. D. Schock Corp; Whitecap Composites; Zim Sailing
- Role: Trainer and racer
- Name: International FJ

Boat
- Crew: two
- Displacement: 165 lb (75 kg)
- Draft: 2.50 ft (0.76 m) with centerboard down
- Trapeze: Trapeze for the FJ was introduced around 1982.

Hull
- Type: monohull
- Construction: plywoodfiberglasscarbon fiber
- LOA: 13.22 ft (4.03 m)
- LWL: 12.25 ft (3.73 m)
- Beam: 5.25 ft (1.60 m)

Hull appendages
- Keel: Centerboard
- Rudder: transom-mounted rudder

Rig
- Rig type: Bermuda rig

Sails
- Sailplan: fractional rigged sloop
- Total sail area: 104.00 sq ft (9.662 m^{2})

The International FJ is a Dutch sailboat that was designed by Uus Van Essen and Conrad Gülcher as a trainer and one design racer, first built in 1956.

The boat was initially called the Flying Dutchman Junior (after the Flying Dutchman one design racer), as it was designed as a trainer for that Olympic sailing class boat. It was later called the Flying Junior. In 1980 the name was again officially changed to the International FJ.

The design became a World Sailing accepted International class in 1972–73. And has held the Flying Junior World Championship every other year since. Now, it is used in a variety of college sailing races.

== Production ==
The design has been built by a large number of companies including Grampian Marine and Paceship Yachts in Canada, Chantier Naval Costantini in France, Alpa Yachts, Centro Nautico Adriatico, Comar Yachts, Galetti and formerly Nautivela in Italy, Van Doesburg, Dusseldorp, Van Wettum and Perry Lengton in The Nederlands, Advance Sailboat Corp, W. D. Schock Corp, Whitecap Composites and Zim Sailing in the United States.

The first Flying Junior was built by Pim van den Brink (Kolibri) in the Dutch village Stompwijk.

4,600 + boats have been built.

W. D. Schock Corp records indicate that they built 70 boats between 1968 and 1972.

It remains in production by Centro Nautico Adriatico, Zim Sailing and Whitecap Composites.

== Design ==
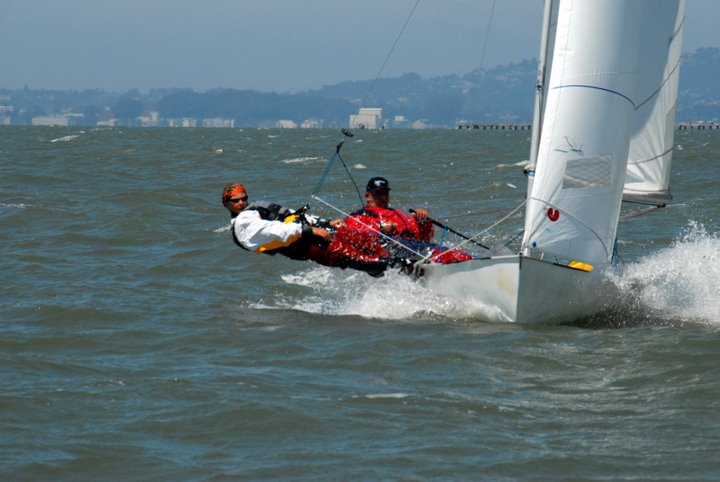
International FJs at the 2007 World Championships in San Francisco Bay

The International FJ is a racing sailing dinghy, with early versions built from wood. Fiberglass was class-authorized in 1960.

The boat has a fractional sloop rig, a raked stem, a plumb transom, a transom-hung rudder controlled by a tiller and retractable centerboard. It displaces 165 lb (75 kg).

The boat has a draft of 2.50 ft (0.76 m) with the centerboard extended and 7 in (18 cm) with it retracted, allowing operation in shallow water, beaching, ground transportation on a trailer or car roof.

For sailing downwind the design may be equipped with a symmetrical spinnaker of 86 sq ft (8.0 m^{2}). The boat is sailed with a crew of two sailors. A single trapeze is available for use by the crew.

The Club FJ is a version with heavier construction but similar dimensions produced by Zim Sailing. It displaces 220 lb (100 kg) and has a spinnaker of 80 sq ft (7.4 m^{2}).

Whitecap Composites produces a lightened version of the design with improved ergonomics, marketed as the "Turbo FJ".

== Operational history ==
The boat is supported by an active class club that organizes racing events, the International FJ Class.

== See also ==
- Flying Junior World Championship
- List of sailing boat types

Related development

- Flying Dutchman (dinghy)
