= Sarlo Family =

Family

The noble House of the Sarlo descends directly from Serlo I of Hauteville, son of Tancred de Hauteville and his first wife Muriella. Sarlo I had a son from his marriage with the daughter of the Lord of Pirou also called Sarlo. Sarlo II went in the Mezzogiorno (south of Italy) with his uncles to seek fortune.

The Sarlo have Marquise title and are one of the most ancient families of Reggio Calabria's aristocracy (The name Sarlo is to be often found in the form Serlo, Serlon, or Serlonis used from its Latin forms).

In the 16th century the Baron Don Octavius Sarlo Utrusque Jure Doctore (U.J.D. - Doctor in both Cesar and Canonical Laws) Nobel Patrician of Reggio Calabria and of Mileto (City in Calabria having been the first Capital of the Norman Kingdom in the Mezzogiorno), was Lord Major of the Nobles of Reggio Calabria from 1592 to 1593.

This Noble House had many more doctor in Laws (U.J.D.) than men of arms (High Rank officials in the Army) and Ecclesiastics. One of the Sarlo was one of the 14 Aristocrats of Reggio Calabria founding the Noble Brotherhood of Saint Dominic. They were Land Lords until the subversion of feudalism in 1806 during the reign of Joachim-Napoleon. Today, the principal representative of this House are Knights of the Sovereign Military Order of Malta.

== Coat of arms ==
Coat of Arms of the Marquises Sarlo Patricians of Reggio Calabria, Lecce and Mileto

Azure, at the abased red fess, with or lion rampant surmounted by three argent mullets of eight points wrongly ordered in chief, at the natural weaved Sea in peak.

== Categories ==
- de Hauteville
- Sarlo I of Hauteville
- Sarlo II of Hauteville
- Reggio Calabria Notable people
