= Prince of Castelbuono =

Italian prince

- Creation: 3 February 1595
- Created by: Philip III of Spain
- Peerage: Peerage of Italy
- First holder: Giovanni Ventimiglia Sabia
- Last holder: Giovanna Ventimiglia Camarrone
- Subsidiary titles: Prince of the Holy Roman Empire, Prince of Belmontino, Prince of Buonriposo, Prince of Scaletta, Marquess of Geraci, Duke of Ventimiglia, Count Palatine, Grandee of Spain
- Extinction date: 1905

The Principality of Castelbuono was a feudal state that existed in Sicily between the end of the 16th century and the beginning of the 19th century, which corresponded to the territory of the present-day municipality of Castelbuono, in the province of Palermo.

== History ==
Castelbuono, a baronial city with the mere and mixed empire of the Val Demone, was founded in 1317 by Francesco Ventimiglia, 2nd Count of Geraci. The Ventimiglias, who from 1436 had the title of Marquesses of Geraci, had feudal dominion over this land until the beginning of the 19th century, when feudalism was abolished in the Kingdom of Sicily, following the promulgation of the constitution of 1812 granted by King Ferdinand III of Sicily.

Giovanni Ventimiglia, 8th Marquess of Geraci (1559–1619), was invested with the title of 1st Prince of Castelbuono on 3 February 1595 by King Philip III of Spain, executed on 22 May of the same year. The last feudal prince was Luigi Ruggero Ventimiglia Perpignano, 14th Prince of Castelbuono (1757–1823), who was a Peer of the Kingdom of Sicily in from 1812 to 1816.

The Ventimiglia branch of the Marquesses of Geraci, holders of the title of Prince of Castelbuono, became extinct in the male line with Giovanni Luigi Ventimiglia Camarrone, 17th Prince of Castelbuono, who died in 1860 without descendants, and the last person to whom the title and the others connected to it were officially recognized, was his sister, Corrada, who obtained the recognition with a Royal Decree of 23 October 1862. Upon the latter's death without heirs in 1886, the titles of the House of Ventimiglia passed to her younger sister Giovanna, who died in 1905, also without descendants, and consequently became extinct.

== Princes of Castelbuono ==
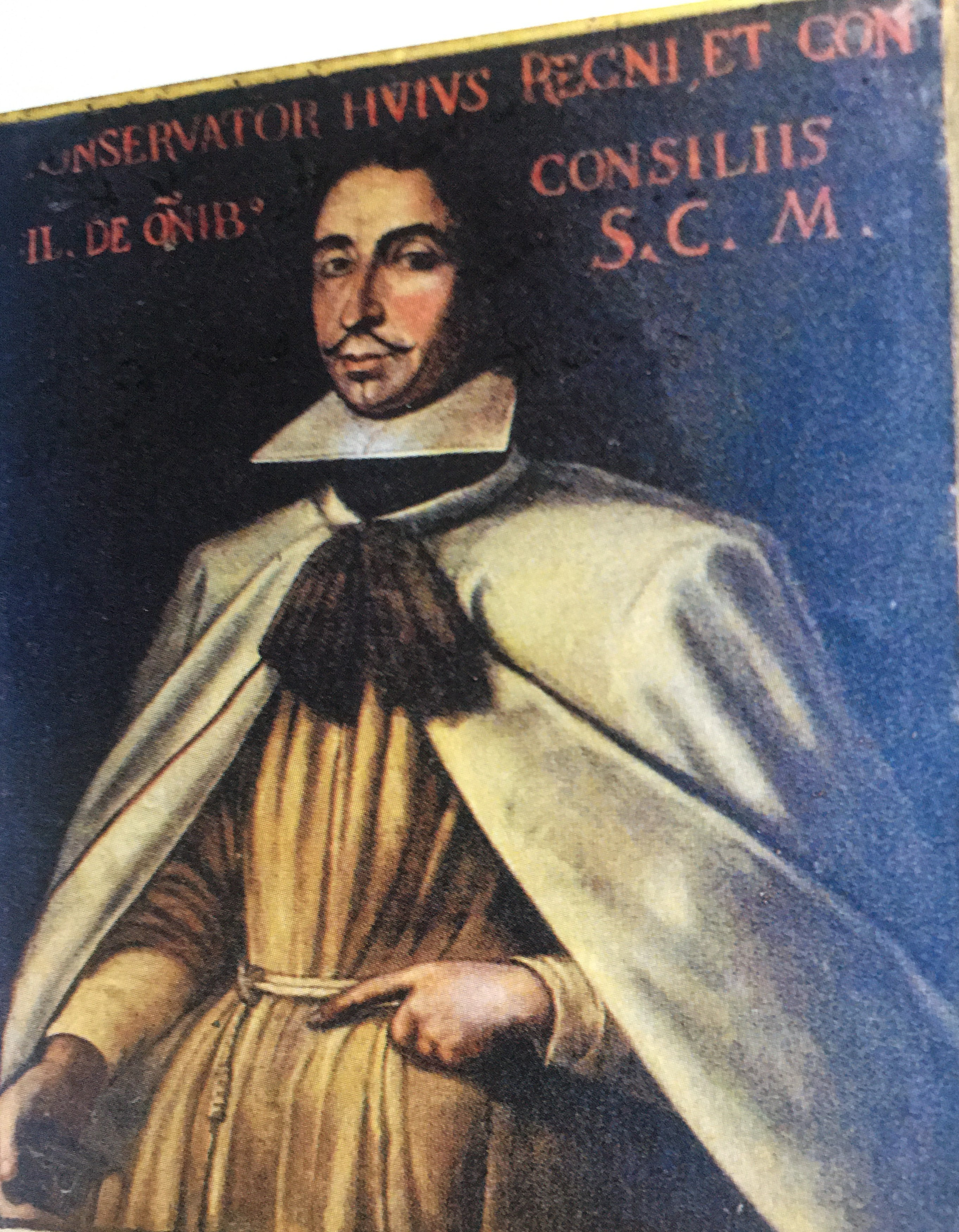
Francesco Ventimiglia, 3rd Prince of Castelbuono

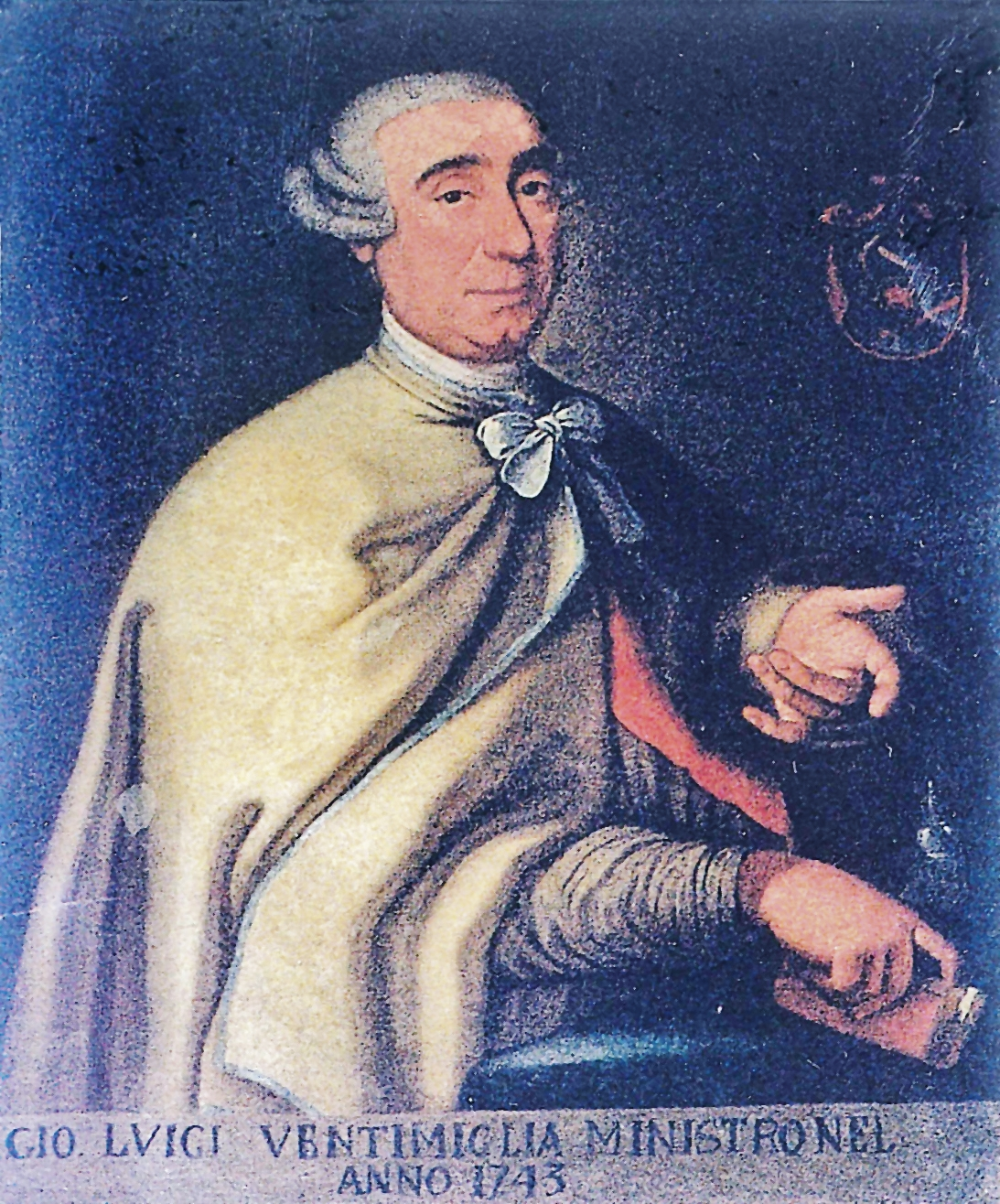
Giovanni Ventimiglia, 11th Prince of Castelbuono

=== Feudal era ===
- 1595–1619: Giovanni Ventimiglia Sabia
- 1619–1620: Giuseppe Ventimiglia Requesens
- 1620–1647: Francesco Ventimiglia d'Aragona
- 1648–1675: Giovanni Ventimiglia Spadafora
- 1675–1688: Francesco Rodrigo Ventimiglia Marquis
- 1688–1689: Felicia Ventimiglia Pignatelli
- 1689–1691: Blasco Ventimiglia Marquis
- 1692–1698: Roger Ventimiglia Marquis
- 1698–1706: Jerome Ventimiglia Spadafora
- 1707–1711: Francis Ventimiglia Corvino Sabia
- 1712–1748: Giovanni Ventimiglia Corvino Sabia
- 1749–1771: Louis Roger Ventimiglia Corvino Sabia
- 1772–1795: John Louis Ventimiglia Corvino Sabia
- 1795–1812: Louis Roger Ventimiglia Corvino Sabia

=== Post-feudal era ===
- 1812–1823: Louis Roger Ventimiglia Corvino Sabia
- 1823–1833: Domenico Gaspare Ventimiglia Corvino Sabia
- 1833–18XX: Francesco Luigi Ventimiglia Corvino Sabia
- 18XX–1860: John Louis Ventimiglia Corvino Sabia
- 1861–1886: Corrada Ventimiglia Corvino Sabia
- 1887–1905: Giovanna Ventimiglia Corvino Sabia
