= Juan de Moncada y de Tolça =

16th Century Spanish nobleman

Juan de Moncada y de Tolça (died after 1536) was a Spanish noble from the 16th century.

He was 3rd count di Marmilla, 11th Sieur of Aitona and 1st count of Aitona since 1532, baron of Serós, Mequinenza and Soses, Sieur of Vallobar, Palma, Ador and Beniarche, 3rd baron of Llagostera.

He became Great Seneschal and "Maestre Racional" of Catalunya, "Maestro Giustiziere" of the kingdom of Naples 1529, del Regno de Sicilia 1529, "Presidente del Regno" on 20 December 1535, and Captain General of the kingdom of Sicily since 12 January 1536, under viceroy Ferrante Gonzaga.

== Marriage and children ==
Juan de Moncada y de Tolça married first, Giovanna La Grua, daughter of Giovanni Vincenzo La Grua, signore di Carini e Misilmeri, later also of Montechiaro, deceased at Carini on 29 May 1517, and his 1st wife Elisabetta Bracco e Calvello, daughter of Giorgio Bracco, Regio milite a Palermo.

He married, second, Ana de Cardona, daughter of Fernando Ramon Folch, 2nd Duke of Cardona and Francisca Manrique de Lara, the sister of Antonio Manrique de Lara, 2nd Duke of Nájera.

Issue from the 1st marriage :

- Isabel de Moncada, who married in 1527 Giovanni II Ventimiglia, 6th Marquis of Geraci.

Issue from the 2nd marriage:

- Francisco de Moncada y Cardona, 1st marquis of Aitona since 1 October 1581, who married in 1560 Lucrecia Gralla.
