= Giovanni II =

Giovanni II may refer to:

- Giovanni II Participazio (9th century)
- Giovanni II Valente (????–1360), third doge of the Republic of Genoa
- Giovanni II Bentivoglio (1443–1508), tyrant of Bologna
- Giovanni II Ventimiglia, 6th Marquis of Geraci (16th century)
- Giovanni II Cornaro (1647–1722), Venetian nobleman and statesman
