= Giovanni II Ventimiglia, 6th Marquess of Geraci =

Sicilian aristocrat

Giovanni II Ventimiglia y Moncada, 6th Marquess of Geraci (died 1533) was a Sicilian aristocrat, a member of the prominent House of Ventimiglia.

Giovanni II Ventimiglia y Moncada, was the son of Simone I Ventimiglia, 5th Marquess of Geraci, (1485–1544). Giovanni II was confirmed as the 6th Marquess in 1545. His grandson, Giovanni III (1559–1619) and former Viceroys of Sicily, is sometimes erroneously as Giovanni II. Giovanni III also served as President of Sicily Kingdom, 1595, 1598 and 1608.

Coat of Arms of Ventimiglia di Geraci.

In 1527 Giovanni married Isabella Moncada y La Grua, niece of the former Spanish Viceroy of Sicily and Naples, and daughter of Hugo's brother, Juan de Moncada y de Tolça, 3rd Count of Marmilia and 1st Count of Aitona.

== Origins of the title Marquess of Geraci ==
In 1436, the first title of Marquess of Geraci was awarded to the 7th Count of Geraci, Giovanni I Ventimiglia, 1st Marquess of Geraci (1383–1475), by the Aragonese Crown, ruling in Sicily since the Sicilian Vespers in 1282. This Giovanni I was also lord of Castelbuono, Tusa, Gangi, San Mauro (San Mauro Castelverde), Pollina, Caronia (from 1412), Cefalù, Sciacca, Termini Imerese; Count of Montesarchio, Bitonto, Casamassima, Serracapriola, Castellamare di Stabia, Orta Nova and Magliano; and finally Baron of Ciminna. Under the Aragonese, Giovanni I served as Grande Ammiraglio del Regno (Grand Admiral of Sicily Kingdom); Viceré di Sicilia (Viceroy of Sicily) from 1430–1432; Governor of Naples Kingdom in 1435; Viceroy of Duchy Athens and Neopatria in 1444; Regent of Naples Kingdom in 1460; and Captain General of the Church in 1445 and 1455. He married a noblewoman from the Moncada family of Spain.

Giovanni married twice: (1) Agata d'Aragona dei Baroni di Caccamo, (2) Isabella Ventimiglia dei Signori di Ciminna.

In 1475, Giovanni I's son by Isabella, Antonio I inherited the title of the 2nd Marquess of Geraci. He served as Grand Admiral and General Captain of Sicily and died in 1480. In 1444, Antonio had married Margherita Guilhem de Clermont-Lodève, sister-in-law of Ferdinand I of Naples and one of the daughters of Tristan de Clermont, the powerful and influential Count of Copertino and Matera. From 1480 to 1490 the 3rd Marquess of Geraci was both a "Ventimiglia - Chiaromonte", namely, Enrico IV. In 1480, he married Eleonora de Luna, born to an influential Spanish family with links to the Aragoese crown. Antonio died in 1493. His son by Eleonora Filippo born after 1480, died however in 1497 before reaching adulthood. The title passed on to Filippo's brother Simone (1485-1544). Simone Ventimiglia served as president of Sicily Kingdom (1516, 1535, 1541) and Treasurer and Comptroller General of Sicily Kingdom (1522-1534). Simone I married Isabella Moncada, from the Counts of Aderno, and the eldest surviving male son was Giovanni II Ventimiglia, who had his succession as Marquess confirmed under Charles V, Holy Roman Emperor.

== The (Ventimiglia - La Grua - Moncada) families ==
Hugo of Moncada y de Tolça, (1476 - Naval battle at the Gulf of Salerno, Italy, 28 May 1528), Viceroy of Sicily, 1509–1517, Viceroy of Naples, 1527–1528, was a young brother of Juan de Moncada y de Tolça, 1st count of Aitona.

The family crest of the Aitona Sicilian-Spanish Marquesses, known as "Moncada"´s with the Marquessate Crown, promoted to Counts in the region of Catalunya, Lleida, in 1532 by Charles V, later promoted to the Marquessate of Aitona by king Philip II of Spain in October 1581, awarded to the 2nd count of Aitona, Francisco de Moncada y de Cardona, deceased 1594

.

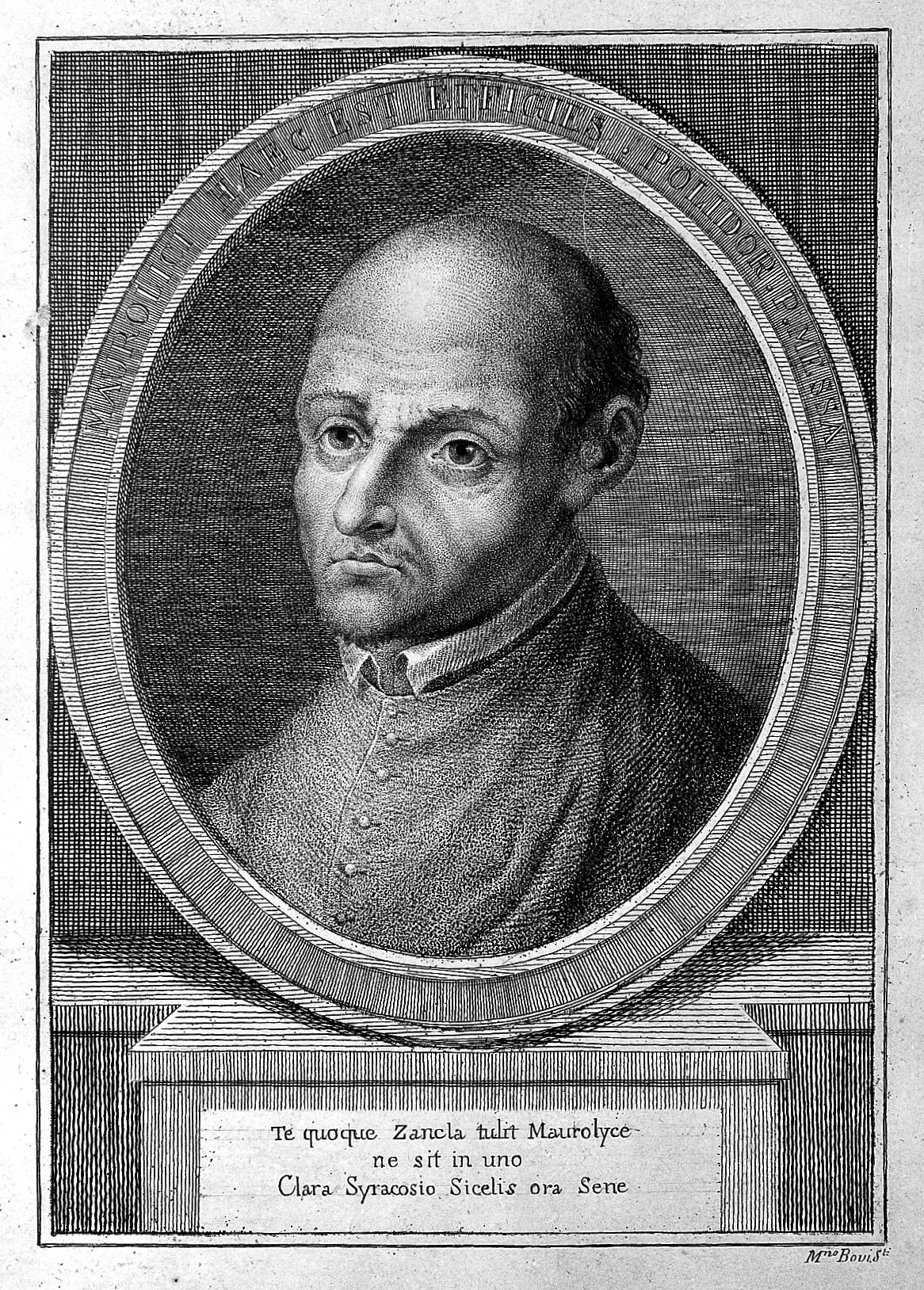
Benedictine monk Maurolico, as his father, and also as was later on Genius of Science Isaac Newton in England, was the head of the Messina mint and for a time was in charge of maintaining the fortifications of the city on behalf of Charles V, Holy Roman Emperor. He tutored the two sons of king Charles' bureaucrat, viceroy of Sicily, 1547 - 1557, Juan de Vega, and had the patronage of many rich and powerful men. He also corresponded with scholars such as Clavius and Federico Commandino. Between 1548 and 1550, Maurolico stayed at the castle of Pollina in Sicily as a guest of the Marquess Giovanni II Ventimiglia, 6th Marquess of Geraci, and utilized the castle tower in order to carry out astronomical observations. Maurolico's astronomical observations include a sighting of the supernova that appeared in Cassiopeia in 1572. Tycho Brahe published details of his observations in 1574; the supernova is now known as Tycho's Supernova. In 1569, he was appointed professor at the University of Messina

The title of Count of Aitona was modified to Marquessate by King Philip II of Spain on 1 October 1581 on behalf of Francisco de Moncada y de Cardona, Count of Ossona, Viscount of Cabrera, Viscount of Bas, Viceroy of Catalonia, 1580–1581, deceased 1594.

Giovanni II Ventimiglia, son in law of Juan de Moncada y de Tolça, 1st Count of Aitona, in 1532, deceased after 1536, brother in law of Francisco de Moncada y de Cardona, deceased 1594, was a keen supporter of the mathematical sciences, besides being twice also Viceroy of Sicily, 1595–1598 and 1606–1607. He supported the efforts of scientist Francesco Maurolico, (1494–1575), see above.

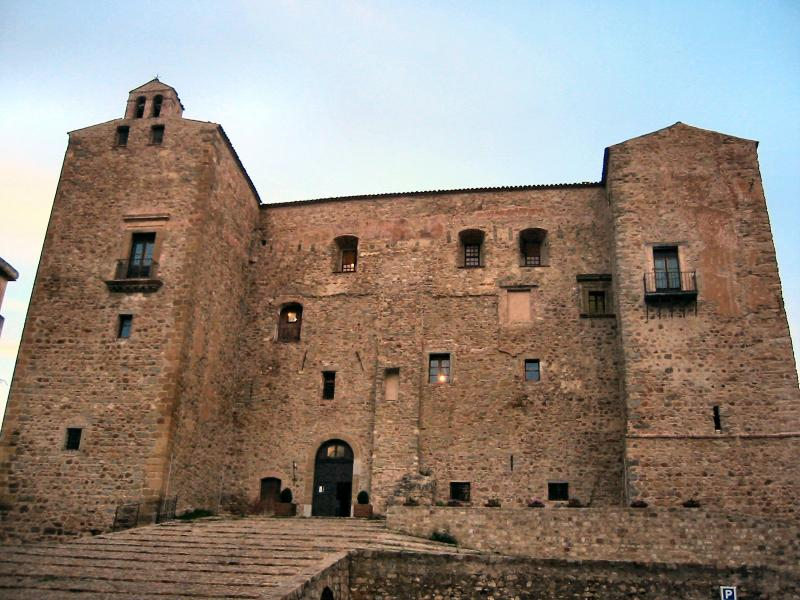
Castle of Castelbuono, Province of Palermo, Sicily, a fief of the House of Ventimiglia family, now with some 10,000 inhabitants, near the sea. Construction of the Castle began in 1316, by order of Count Francesco I of Ventimiglia, over the ruins of the ancient Byzantine town of Ypsigro, high on the San Pietro hill
