= Doesburg (surname) =

Doesburg or van Doesburg is a surname. Notable people with the surname include:

- Els van Doesburg (born 1989), Dutch-Belgian politician
- John Doesburg (born 1947), American general
- Lloyd Doesburg (1960–1989), Dutch football goalkeeper
- Michel Doesburg (born 1968), Dutch football player
- Nelly van Doesburg (1899–1975), Dutch musician, dancer, artist and art collector
- Pepijn Doesburg (born 2001), Dutch footballer
- Pim Doesburg (1943–2020), Dutch football goalkeeper
- Theo van Doesburg (1883–1931), Dutch artist

== See also ==
- Doesburg, a city in the Netherlands
- Architype Van Doesburg, a geometric sans-serif typeface
