= Flying Junior World Championship =

Dinghy sailing regatta

The Flying Junior World Championship also known as the FJ World Championship is an bi-annual international sailing regatta of Flying Junior class dinghy, organized by the host club on behalf of the International FJ Class Association and recognized by World Sailing, the sports IOC recognized governing body. The class gained World Sailing recognition in 1972 but held five international regatta before that date.

== Events ==
Ed.			Hosts			Sailors			Boats				Ref.
No	Day/Month	Year	Host club	City	Country	No.	Nat.	Cont.	No.			Mix	Ref.
N/A		1963		San Remo	Italy								
N/A		1965		Saltsjöbaden	Sweden								
N/A	4-8 Sep	1967	Royal St. Lawrence Yacht Club	Dorval, Quebec	Canada								
N/A		1969		Muiden	Netherlands								
N/A		1971		Lake Tahoe	United States								
1		1973		Nieuport	Belgium								
2		1975		Venezia	Italy								
3		1977		Whitstable	United Kingdom								
4	11-17 Aug	1979	Richmond Yacht Club, California	Point Richmond, Richmond, California	United States								
5		1981		Muiden	Netherlands								
6		1983		Castiglione della Pescaia	Italy								
7		1985		Blankenberge	Belgium								
8		1987		Sakaiminato	Japan								
9		1989		Medemblick	Netherlands								
10		1991		Senigallia	Italy								
11		1993		Inage	Japan								
12	15-23 Jul	1995		Stralsund	Germany								
13	21-26 Jul	1997	San Francisco Yacht Club	Belvedere, California	United States								
14	20-25 Jul	1999		Porto San Giorgio	Italy								
15	17-23 Jul	2001		Atsumi	Japan	130	8	4	65				
16	26Jul -1Aug	2003	Royal Netherlands Yacht Club	Muiden	Netherlands	106	8	3	53	31	5	17	
17	23-30 Jul	2005		Lake Duemmer	Germany	88	8	3	44				
18	21-29 Jul	2007		San Francisco	United States	40	6	3	20	11	0	9	
19	12-17 Jul	2009	Sailing Association Alto Sebino	Lake Iseo, Lovere, Bergamo	Italy	110	7	2	55	22	1	32	
20	23-31 Jul	2011	Koninklijke Yacht Club Nieuwpoort	Nieuwpoort	Belgium	72	7	3	36	14	0	22	
21	27Jul -2Aug	2013	Segelclub Lembruch	Lake Dümmer, Lembruch, LS	Germany	112	8	3	56	29	3	24	
22	26Jul -1Aug	2015		Hayama	Japan		5	3	52				
23		2017		Portorož	Slovenia	116	8	2	58	22	4	32	
24	24-27 Jul	2019	Lega Navale Italiana Porto San Giorgio	Porto San Giorgio, Fermo	Italy	104	6	3	52	28	2	22	
24		2021		Monnickendam	Netherlands	42	2	1	21	7	2	12	
26		2022	GEAS NBC Vela Colico	Colico	Italy	110	4	1	55	20	6	29	
27		2024	Lubecker Yacht Club	Held as part of Travemünde Woche; Travemünde, Lübeck, Schleswig-Holstein	Germany	84	8	3	42	21	3	18	
28	27-31 Jul	2026/25	Circolo Velico Elbano	Elbano	Italy	104	7	3	52	20	5	27	

== Medalists ==
Year	Gold	Silver	Bronze	Ref.
1963; Italy	Duuk Dudok van Heel (NED); Cocky v.d. Berg (NED)			
1965; Sweden	Duuk Dudok van Heel (NED); Joan v. Ogtrop (NED)			
1967; Canada	Duuk Dudok van Heel (NED); Marleen van Duyl (NED)			
1969; Netherlands	Duuk Dudok van Heel (NED); Gerrie Keersbergen (NED)			
1971; United States	Steve Lewis (USA); Randy Lewis (USA)			
1973; Belgium	Bertocchi (ITA); Apostoli (ITA)			
1975; Italy	De Martis (ITA); Stanniero (ITA)			
1977; United Kingdom	G. Noe (ITA); S. Noe (ITA)			
1979; United States	Steve Klotz (USA); Steve Brillant (USA)			
1981; Netherlands	Steve Klotz (USA); Steve Brillant (USA)			
1983; Italy	Steve Klotz (USA); Steve Brillant (USA)			
1985; Belgium	Thierry Den Hartigh (BEL); Peter Laureysens (BEL)			
1987; Japan	Takayuki Shimadzu (JPN); Kouichi Hasegawa (JPN)			
1989; Netherlands	Jan Bultman (NED); Willy Bosveld (NED)			
1991; Italy	Hans Cox (NED); Alexander Cox (NED)			
1993; Japan	Katsuya Takagi (JPN); Keiichi Asari (JPN)			
1995; Germany	Hans Cox (NED); Robert Jan Cox (NED)			
1997; United States	Hans Cox (NED); Robert Jan Cox (NED)			
1999; Italy	Peter Wanders (GER); Susanne Wanders (GER)			
2001; Japan	J-1270; Kenta Shingo (JPN); Satochi Komura (JPN)	J-1406; Yuya Ishikawa (JPN); Kensuke Amagai (JPN)	GER-361; Peter Wanders (GER); Sjors Boelaars (GER)	
2003; Netherlands	JPN 1566; Hiromi Saitou (JPN); Hikaru Dewa (JPN)	NED 1473; Bernard Stienstra (NED); Dieuwke Duk (NED)	JPN 1466; Yasushi Kondou (JPN); Akihiko Akustu (JPN)	
2005; Germany	GER-361; Peter Wanders (GER); Gisa Wortberg (GER)	JPN-1493; Kentaro Inamura (JPN); Taishi Funo (JPN)	GER-288; Sebastian Lier (GER); Jessica Lier (GER)	
2007; United States	GER-361; Peter Wanders (GER); Gisa Wortberg (GER)	GER-407; Thorsten Willemsen (GER); Barbara Gurbenbecher (GER)	NED-775; Bert Wolff (NED); Ronald Kalkhoven (NED)	
2009; Italy	JPN-1; Haruka Shimodaira (JPN); Takumi Ichigawa (JPN)	ITA-3742; Tommaso Ciampolini (ITA); Massimo Ciampolini (ITA)	GER-407; Thorsten Willemsen (GER); Stepanie Tauchert (GER)	
2011; Belgium	NED 961; Rolf de Jong (NED); Esther Pothuis (NED)	JAP 1419; Takuya Shimamoto (JPN); Naoto Tanaka (JPN)	JAP 1685; Ryougen Suzuki (JPN); Yoshiya Kato (JPN)	
2013; Germany	NED 1341; Guido So (NED); Kristina Gründken (NED)	GER 361; Peter Wanders (GER); Robin Drießen (GER)	GER 381; Norbert Riffeler (GER); Korsmeier-Rif (GER)	
2015; Japan	Enishi Naka (JPN); Terutaka Tada (JPN)			
2017; Slovenia	NED 961; Rolf De Jong (NED); Esther De Jong (NED)	NED 1316; Guido Sol (NED); Hugo De Jong (NED)	GER 362; Heiko Riffeler (GER); Claudia Riffeler-Lorcks (GER)	
2019; Italy	NED 1316; Guido Sol (NED); Hugo De Jong (NED)	NED 961; Esther De Jong (NED); Rolf De Jong (NED)	NED 1332; Hylke Sasse (NED); Madelein Van Der Hout (NED)	
2021; Netherlands	NED 1332 - Fliegende Jongen; Hylke Sasse (NED); Madelein Van Der Hout (NED)	NED 1316 - Solucion; Guido Sol (NED); Koen De Nooijer (NED)	NED-1455 - Spetters; Elske Vermeij (NED); Oigen Blankert (NED)	
2022; Italy	NED 1332; Hylke Sasse (NED); Madelein Van Der Hout (NED)	NED 1316; Guido Sol (NED); Koen De Nooijer (NED)	NED 961; Esther De Jong (NED); Miriam De Jong (NED)	
2024; Germany	NED 1332; Hylke Sasse (NED); Doete Vogelaar (NED)	GER 407; Matthias Riffeler (GER); Justus Rüthing (GER)	NED 961; Esther De Jong (NED); Miriam De Jong (NED)	
2026	NED-1316; Guido Sol (NED); Koen De Nooijer (NED)	NED-1332; Hylke Sasse (NED); Annemart Schamal (NED)	GER-407; Matthias Riffeler (GER); Rujking Junntus (GER)	

== Sources ==
- International Class organization (in English)
