= Francesco I Ventimiglia =

Italian politician

Francesco I Ventimiglia (1285 – 2 January 1338) was an Italian nobleman and politician. He inherited the title of Count of Geraci.

== Early life ==
Francesco was born in Geraci Siculo in 1285, the son of Aldoino Ventimiglia and Giacoma Filangieri. The Ventimiglia of Sicily putatively derive from a noble Frank or Lombard family, descendants of Berengar II of Italy, and ruling the County in Ventimiglia (Liguria) until 1180 when a branch moved to Sicily.

== Career ==
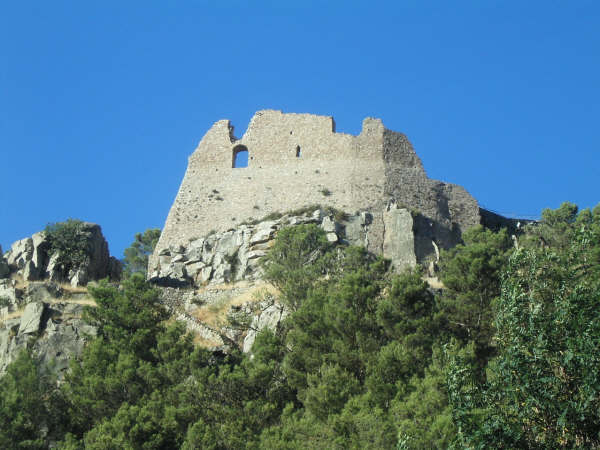
Geraci Castle

Francesco inherited the title of Count of Geraci from his grandfather, Henry II. He served King Frederick III of Sicily as ambassador to the papal court in Avignon. He fought in Marseille for the Anjou forces. In 1318, he served in a mission to negotiate peace with James II of Aragon. In 1336–1337, he briefly served King Frederick as the main Chamberlain or minister, but upon Frederick's death, Peter II of Aragon favored the Palizzi and Chiaramonte families. Francesco's son, called Franceschello, and his secretary, on a mission to the King's court in Palermo, were imprisoned and the secretary was tortured to confess that Francesco and Frederick of Antioch were complicit in a plot against King Peter.

The King and his allies forces, including the Chiaramonte, besieged the Castle of Geraci, to which Ventimiglia had retired. The facts of his death are unclear, but legend holds he attempted to flee with his weapon and either fell down a cliff or was stabbed (or both) by Francesco di Valguernera, Lord of Godrano.

== Personal life ==
In 1315, he wed Costanza Chiaramonte Mosca, daughter of Manfredi, count of Modica. However, ten years later, he repudiated his wife as barren. He remarried with a noblewoman from the Antiochia family, Counts of Capizzi. However, a feud with the Chiaramonte family would contribute to his ultimate downfall.

His confiscated properties were returned to two of his children in 1354: Emanuele and Franceschello. Francesco was buried in the church of San Bartolomeo in Geraci Siculo.
