= Sant'Anna =

Sant'Anna may refer to:

== Places ==
=== Italy ===
- Sant'Anna Arresi, Sardinia
- Sant'Anna d'Alfaedo, province of Verona
- Sant'Anna di Stazzema, Tuscany; the site of the Sant'Anna di Stazzema massacre during World War II
- Boschi Sant'Anna, Veneto

== Churches ==
- Sant'Anna, Alcamo, church in Alcamo
- Sant'Anna, Brugherio, small church in a town in Monza and Brianza, Italy
- Sant'Anna al Capo, church in Palermo, Sicily, Italy
- Sant'Anna a Capuana, church in Naples, Italy
- Sant'Anna, Genoa, church and monastery in region of Liguria, Italy
- Sant'Anna, Lendinara, church in Lendinara, Italy
- Sant'Anna dei Lombardi, church and monastic complex in Naples, Italy
- Sant'Anna la Misericordia, church and former monastery in Palermo, Italy
- Sant'Anna dei Palafrenieri, church in Rome, Italy
- Sant'Anna di Palazzo, church in Naples, Italy
- Sant'Anna, Piacenza, church in Piacenza, Italy
- Sant'Anna, Qrendi (Kappella ta' Sant'Anna), oratory in Qrendi, Malta
- Sant'Anna, Sessa Aurunca, church in province of Caserta, Campania, Italy
- Sant'Anna, Spello, church in province of Perugia, Umbria, Italy
- Sant'Anna, Trani, church in Apulia, Italy
- Sant'Anna al Trivio, church in Naples

== People ==
- Saint Anne, the mother of Mary (mother of Jesus) in the Catholic tradition
- Affonso Romano de Sant'Anna (born 1937), Brazilian writer
- Moraci Sant'Anna (born 1951), Brazilian football manager
- Sérgio Sant'Anna (1941–2020), Brazilian writer

== Other ==
- Sant'Anna Airport, near Crotone in Calabria, Italy
- Sant'Anna di Isola Capo Rizzuto rosso o rosato, a Calabrian wine
- Sant'Anna School of Advanced Studies, University of Pisa
- Sant'Anna (river), in southern Sicily

== See also ==
- Santana (disambiguation)
