= Sant'Anna, Lendinara =

Italian Roman Catholic Church

Coordinates: 45°5′2.4″N 11°35′53.6″E

Sant'Anna or Santa Maria e Sant'Anna is a Renaissance style, Roman Catholic church in the city of Lendinara, in the province of Rovigo, region of Veneto, Italy.

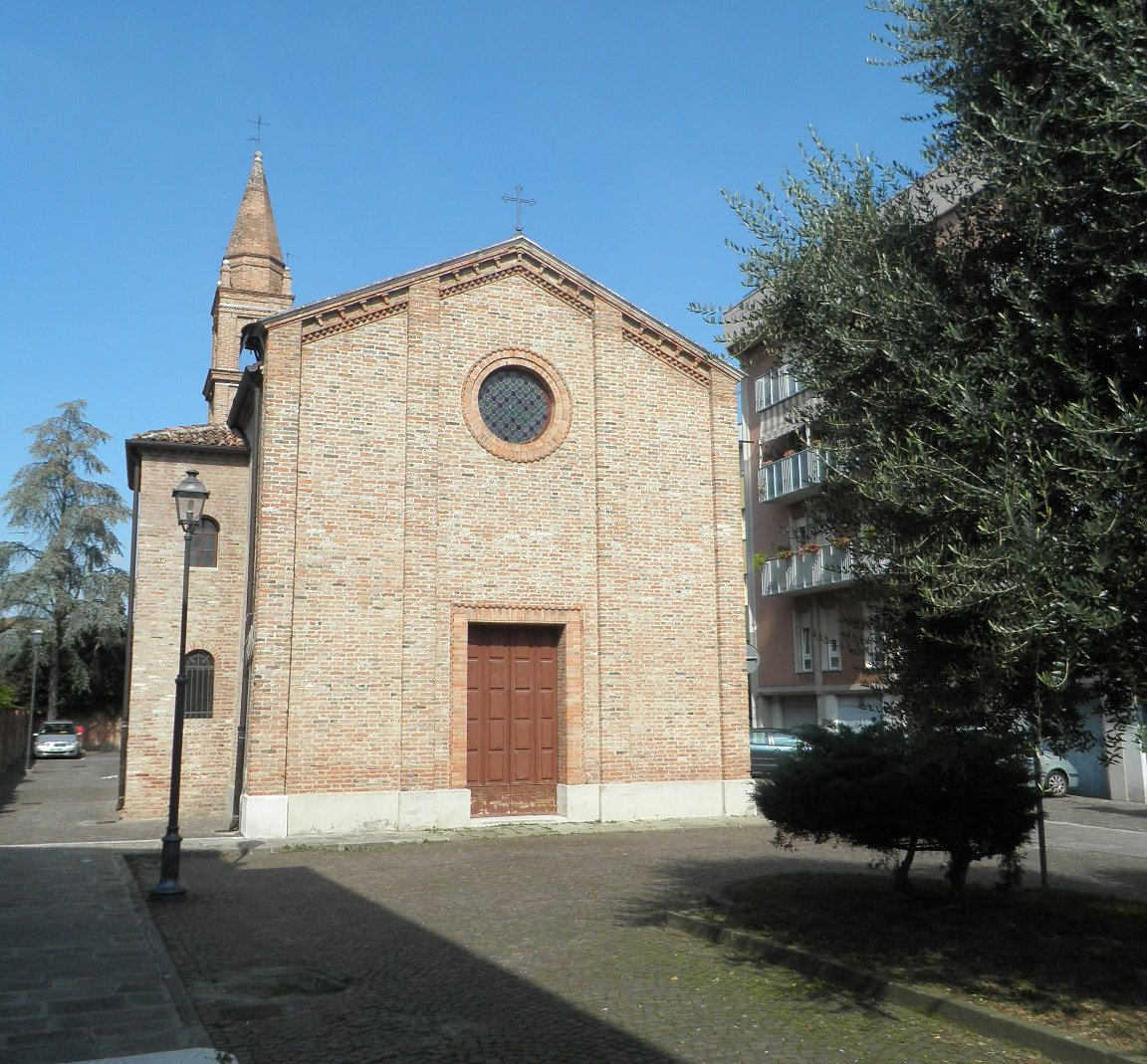
Facade and bell-tower

== History ==
The simple facade is made of brick with a circular oculus and full-story pilasters. Construction of an oratory and a Benedictine convent for nuns began in 1433 with land donations by Anna Bollato Falconetti.

During the 16th-century a convent of Benedictine nuns was adjacent and documented till 1777. In 1799 it was occupied by Russians, and briefly made into an orthodox church. In the 19th-century it was restored by Don Gaetano Baccari. The brick facade was refurbished in the 1930s.

The main altarpiece depicts a Virgin and Child with Saints Anne, Joseph, Young John the Baptist, and Jacob(1816) by Giovanni Baccari. On the altar on the left is a work by an anonymous late Mannerist painter depicting the Calling of Matthew. On the altar of the right, is a canvas depicting theMadonna del Carmine appears before Saints, Kings, Doge and Souls in Purgatory (circa 1614) by Andrea Vicentino.
