= Migliaccio =

Migliaccio is an Italian surname. Notable people with the surname include:

- Dirce Migliaccio (1933–2009), Brazilian actress
- Flávio Migliaccio (1934–2020), Brazilian actor, film director and screenwriter
- Giulio Migliaccio (born 1981), Italian footballer
- Lucia Migliaccio (1770–1826), wife of Ferdinand I of the Two Sicilies
- Oreste Migliaccio (1882–1973), American jazz pianist, composer and bandleader
- Sergio Migliaccio (born 1974), Uruguayan footballer
- Lance Migliaccio (born 1963), American actor, producer, videocast/podcast host, and political activist
