= Galletti =

Galletti is a surname. Notable people with the surname include:

- Alessio Galletti, Italian racing cyclist
- Arthur Galletti (1877–1967), British Indian civil servant
- Carlo Galletti, Italian footballer
- Filippo Maria Galletti, Italian painter
- Giacomo Galletti, Bishop of Alessano
- Gian Luca Galletti, Italian politician
- Giovanna Galletti, Italian actress
- Giulio Galletti, Bishop of Alessano
- Johann Georg August Galletti – German historian and geographer
- Luciano Galletti, Argentine retired footballer
- Paolo Galletti, Italian swimmer
- Pietro Luigi Galletti, Italian historian
- Rubén Horacio Galletti, Argentine retired footballer

== See also ==
- Galetti
