= John Doesburg =

Retired US army general

John C. Doesburg
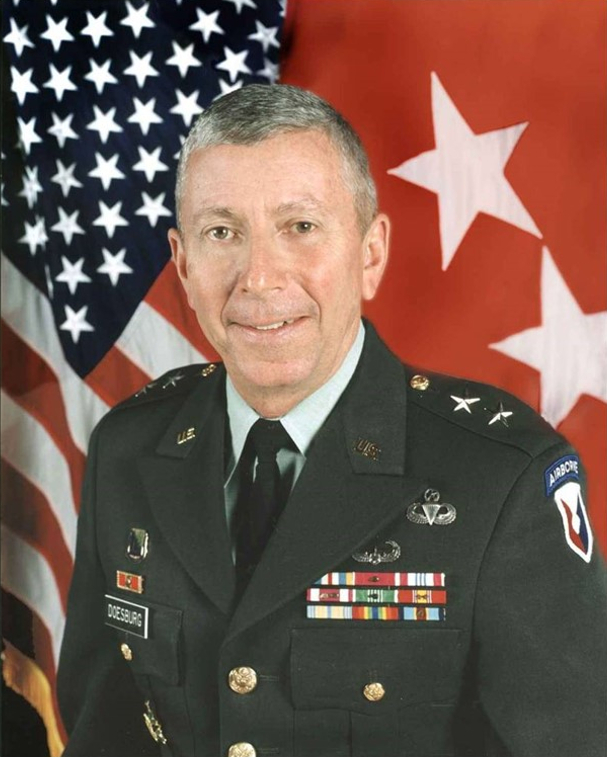
- Born: May 15, 1947 (age 79); Milwaukee, Wisconsin, U.S.
- Education: University of Oklahoma
- Military career
- Allegiance: United States
- Branch: United States Army
- Service years: 1970–2004
- Rank: Major General

John C. Doesburg (born May 15, 1947) is a retired general for the United States Army.

He was the commanding general for the Army Soldier Biological and Chemical Command.

== Biography ==
Doesburg was born on March 15, 1947, in Milwaukee to an Army family.

During his childhood he lived in places like Pennsylvania, Texas, Germany, Oklahoma and Arkansas.

In 1970, he graduated from the University of Oklahoma with a degree in chemistry. The same year, he joined the United States Army through Reserve Officers' Training Corps.

In 2010, he became the honorary colonel of the regiment.

In the 2024 United States presidential election, Doesburg endorsed Kamala Harris.
