= Ingelmarius =

Ingelmarius was a Norman knight of humble origins who served Roger I, the count of Sicily. In reward for his good service to Roger, Ingelmarius was given the hand of the widow of Roger's nephew Serlo II of Hauteville, the lady Altruda of Boiano. In addition to giving Ingelmarius control of the vast conquests and rights of Altruda's first husband (including the city of Geraci), the marriage also raised Ingelmarius up socially into the nobility.

Unfortunately, Ingelmarius's loyalty to Roger slipped proportionally to his perceived increased standing. Shortly after the wedding, Ingelmarius begun to construct defenses in Geraci from which to resist Roger while simultaneously convincing the town's citizens to support him instead. Angered, Roger demanded that Ingelmarius immediately reduce his fortifications, an act which Ingelmarius refused.

In response, Roger immediately raised an army and marched to Geraci to invest it. Finally, in fear for his fate should he be captured, with the citizens of Geraci tiring of his politics, Ingelmarius fled Geraci leaving Altruda and Geraci to their fate. Roger immediately restored to Altruda all that had belonged to her before the marriage, and in peaceful agreement with the leaders of Geraci, the city was brought back into the fold of Roger's domains.

No more mention is made of Ingelmarius by Roger's contemporary biographer Geoffrey Malaterra.

== Sources ==
- Geoffrey Malaterra. The Deeds of Count Roger of Calabria, Book III
- Gaufredo Malaterra. De rebus gestis Rogerii Calabriae et Siciliae comitis et Roberti Guiscardi Ducis fratris eius, Liber tertius
