= Landolina =

Landolina is a surname. Notable people with the surname include:

- Emiliano Landolina (born 1986), Italian footballer
- Giovanni Battista Landolina (fl. 1690s), Sicilian landowner and intellectual
- Joe Landolina (born 1993), American biomedical engineer
