= Ventimiglia family =

Italian noble family

Ventimiglia
- Left: Ventimiglia del Maro; Right: Ventimiglia di Geraci
- Parent family: Ventimiglia
- Founded: 8th–10th century
- Titles: Prince of the Holy Roman Empire; Prince of Castelbuono; Prince of Belmonte; Prince of Grammonte; Prince of Scaletta; Prince of Belmontino; Prince of Valdina; Prince of Villadorata; Prince of Ventimiglia di Sicilia; Prince of Sant'Anna; Prince of Buonriposo; Prince of San Mauro; Prince of Cattolica; Prince of Belvedere; Marquess of Geraci

The Ventimiglia family is an old Italian noble family of Liguria. Descendants of the family held positions and titles of nobility in Sicily during the Middle Ages and later.

== History ==
Over the centuries, various scholars and genealogists have formulated various hypotheses on the origin of the family, all of which agree that its foundation dates back to the 10th century .

According to the historian Pietro Gioffredo, in his work History of the Maritime Alps, the founder was a certain Otto, son of Aleramo del Monferrato, who in 999 settled in the County of Ventimiglia, which he enfeoffed by concession obtained from the Marquis Arduin of Ivrea, who in that same year was elected King of Italy.

The brothers Otto (d. 1077) and Corrado (d. 1082), in 1040 had their investiture as Counts of Ventimiglia confirmed. A Genoese document from 1039 attests to the existence of a Corrado, Count of Ventimiglia, son of another Count Corrado. In the deed the Count cedes various important rights already enjoyed on the residents in the lands of the Diocese of Genoa in the locus et fundus of San Remo in favour of the Bishop, who, therefore, became Lord as well as owner of those lands. In another document, dating back to 1041, and preserved at the Abbey of Lerino, it appears that the Counts Ottone and Corrado of Ventimiglia donated the Monastery of San Michele and all its appurtenances to the Benedictine monks of the monastery founded by Onorato of Arles. The donation was confirmed with a subsequent act of 1063, in which the Montenero hill and the Seborga Castle are also mentioned.

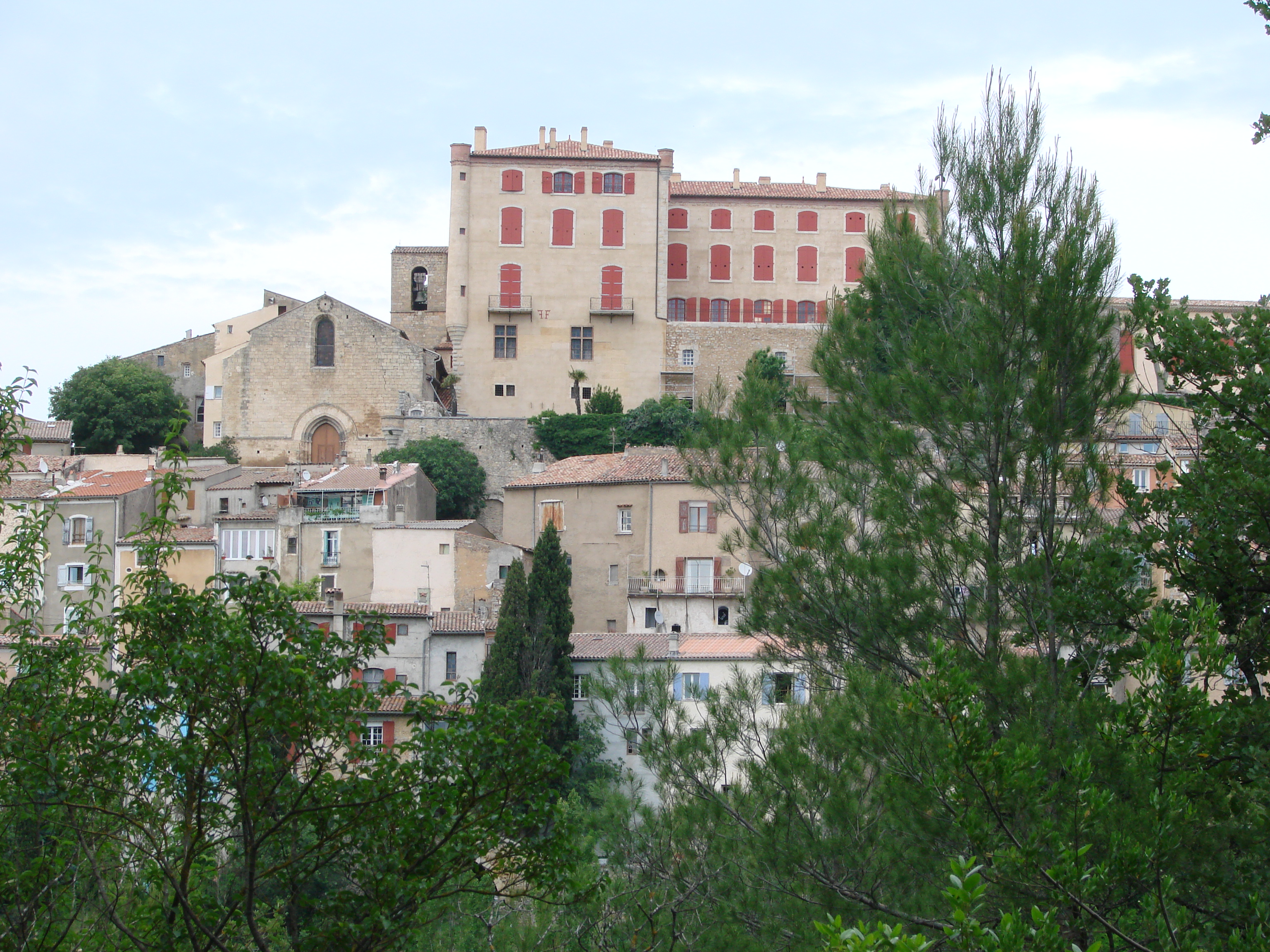
The Ventimiglia Château in La Verdière, in the Var department in Provence-Alpes-Côte d'Azur

The county depended on the March of Turin, and when this dissolved in 1091, the Ventimiglia – who took their surname from the county of which they were owners – acquired control of the territories of the Maro and Prelà valleys, thus becoming among the major feudatories of the far western Liguria. The feudal expansion of the Ventimiglia was frowned upon by the Republic of Genoa, which aimed to establish its own political hegemony in the whole of Liguria, and for this reason the Genoese asked and obtained from the emperor Conrad III of Swabia the right to militarily attack the County, which was devastated and occupied in August 1140, despite the strenuous defense of its inhabitants. In 1146, Count Oberto (d. 1152), eldest son of Otto and Lord of Ventimiglia, to regain possession of his other fiefs, was forced to recognize Genoa's jurisdiction over the city, and he swore allegiance to the Maritime Republic and became its consul.

Ventimiglia became an autonomous municipality, and his family having lost part of its jurisdiction over it, Count Otto II (d. c. 1200) recognized the political and administrative role of the local nobles who had formed associations called "compagne", and from then on the government of the city was governed by the consuls. The latter readmitted the members of the feudal family into the city, with Guido Guerra of the Counts of Ventimiglia (last known living in 1167), son of Oberto II. However, the balance that had been created with Guido Guerra was broken by his brother Otto, who clashed with the Ventimiglia consuls to reclaim the authority of his dynasty over the city: in 1184, the soldiers in the service of the Ligurian municipality besieged the castles of Roccabruna, Sant'Agnese and Dolceacqua, dominions of the Counts of Ventimiglia. The following year a truce was reached, with the surrender of the Count and the subsequent agreement stipulated between Otto and the consul Gandolfo Cassolo, on 8 September 1185, in which the former was obliged to definitively renounce his lordship over the city.

Ottone, in violation of the peace stipulated with Cassolo, together with his son Guglielmo and his cousin Enrico, attacked Ventimiglia in 1192–93 [ 29 ], subsequently besieged by the Genoese and the other Ligurian municipalities allied with them. In 1222, Guglielmo became podestà of Ventimiglia, which had been destroyed by the wars against the other municipalities that had joined forces against it, which was subjected to the Republic of Genoa in 1251.

In 1249, the Counts of Ventimiglia had stipulated an agreement with the government of Genoa, but the latter, not particularly satisfied with them, with a decree issued by the podestà Martino di Sommariva on 29 October 1254, accused them of felony and deprived them of all their fiefs . Count William II of Ventimiglia, son of the previous one, in 1257 stipulated an agreement with Charles of Anjou, Count of Provence, with which he ceded to the latter the lands inherited from his father of Mentonasco and the valley of Lantosca, and the renunciation of any claim on the County of Ventimiglia.

== Branches ==
Coat of arms of the Lascaris di Ventimiglia

Towards the end of the 13th century, the Counts of Ventimiglia lost all rights to their ancient fiefdom, but they had long since settled in other locations in Liguria, and beyond, and gave rise to various branches.

=== Ventimiglia del Maro ===
The branch originated with Count Otto II of Ventimiglia, 1st Lord of Maro, who was succeeded by his firstborn son Enrico (d. 1226), who in 1218 entered the Company of the Municipality of Albenga and subsequently also assumed citizenship of the Republic of Genoa.

They lost possession of Maro in the second half of the 16th century, and maintained that of Aurigo. The branch became extinct with Ruggero Ventimiglia, Lord of Aurigo, who died in 1687, whose only daughter, Paola Maria, married Gio Batta de Gubernatis. From their marriage, only one daughter was born, Maria Lucrezia, who married Alessandro Ferrero of the Marquesses of Alassio. The heirs of the dynasty are the Ferrero de Gubernatis Ventimiglia.

=== Lascaris di Ventimiglia ===
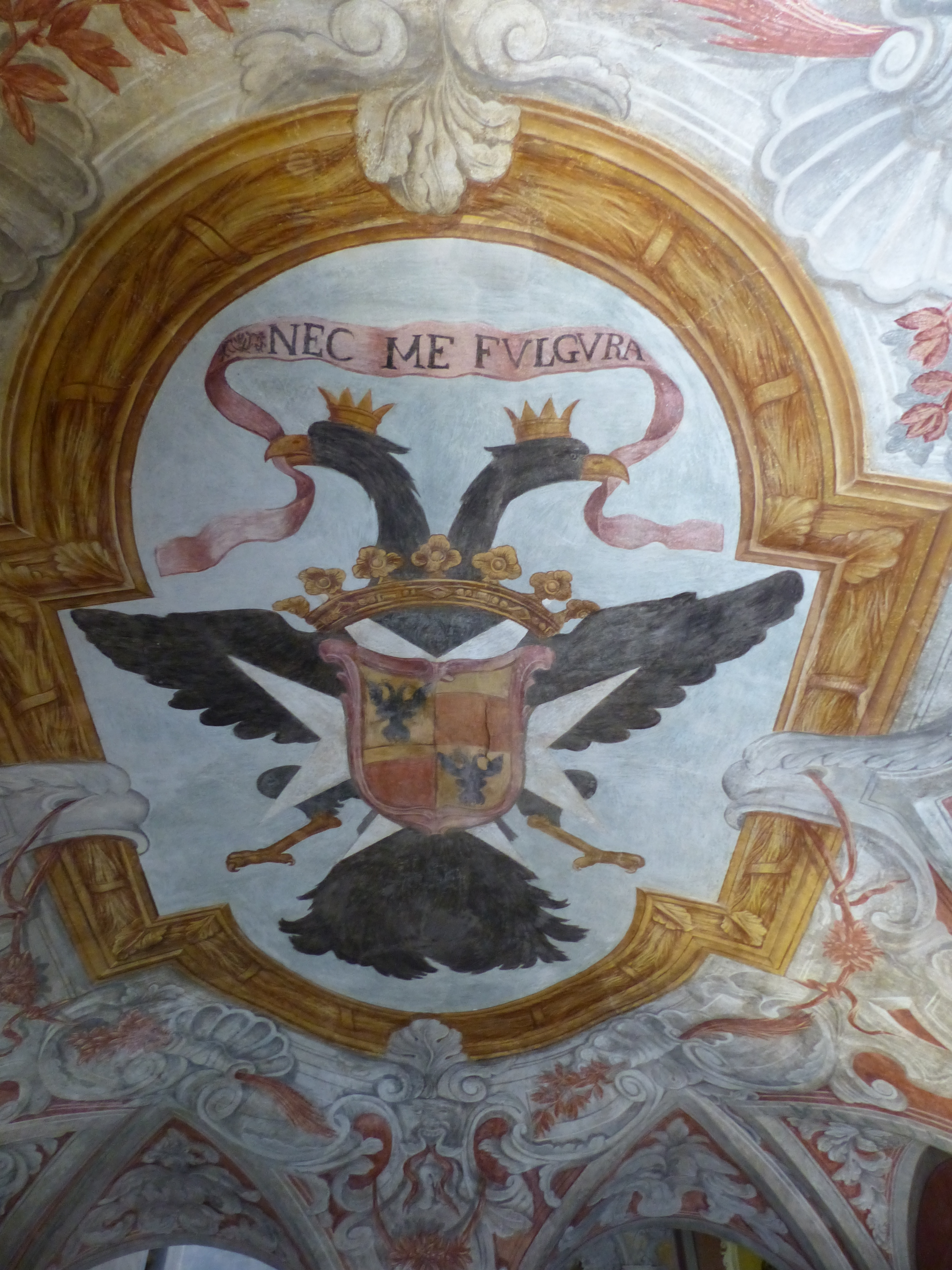
Arms of Lascaris at the Ventimiglia palace, Nice, France

This branch is the main branch of the family descended by primogeniture from Corrado I, and with Guglielmo Pietro I they assumed the title of Count of Ventimiglia and Tenda after 1258.

In 1261 William Peter I of Ventimiglia (d. c. 1283), married Eudoxia Laskarina (1248–1311), daughter of the Byzantine Emperor Theodore II and his wife Princess Elena of Bulgaria, and it was imposed that the descendants had to take as their first surname that of Lascaris. Having become Marquesses of Rocchetta, the last scion of the family was Agostino Lascaris of Ventimiglia, who died in 1838, who had no male children from his wife Giuseppina Carron of San Tommaso, and the titles passed into the Benso family, since the first-born daughter Adele was married to the Marquess Gustavo Benso of Cavour.

=== De Vintimille ===
Coat of arms of the Ventimille Lords of Luc

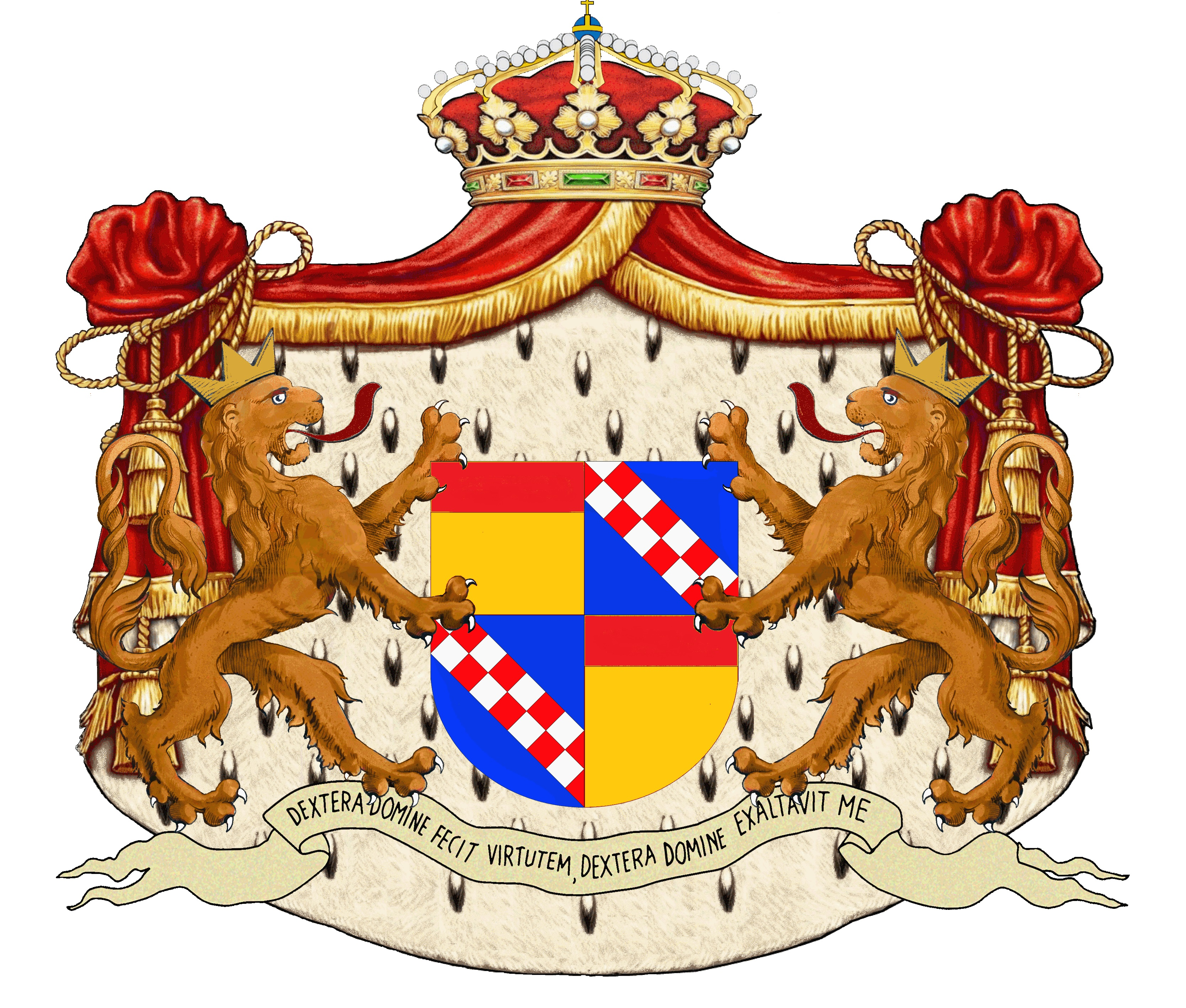
Coat of arms of the Ventimiglia Princes of the Holy Roman Empire, of Castelbuono and of the Marquesses of Geraci

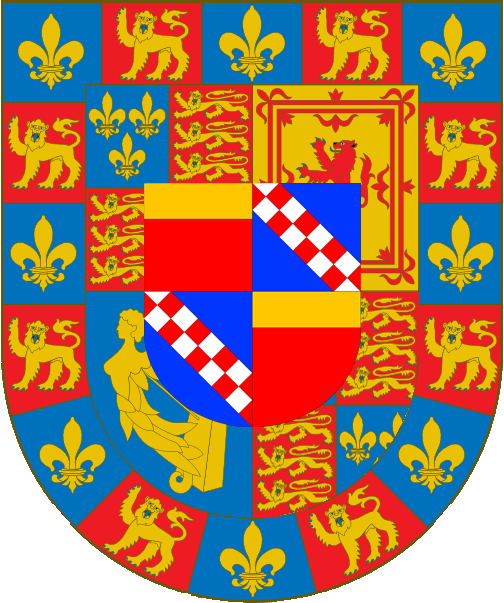
Coat of arms of the Ventimiglia Princes of Grammonte

Like the Lascaris di Ventimiglia, it also derives from the main branch that originated from Corrado I. His great-grandson, Emanuele of Ventimiglia (d. 1285), son of Boniface I, passed to Provence, where he settled, and with him one of the Provençal lines of the family originated, called De Vintimille.

Father of Boniface II, from the latter was born Manuel who married Sibilla d'Evenos, daughter of William of Signe, who brought him as a dowry ten thousand gold sous. The branches of the Lords of Verdière, the Lords of Montpezat, the Lords of Ollioules and Luc, the Lords of Turriers and the Viscounts of Marseille originated.

=== Ventimiglia di Geraci ===
The dynasty of the Counts of Ventimiglia settled in Sicily with Henry II of Ventimiglia (d. 1308) of the Lords of Maro, who arrived on the island around 1255 as Baron of Petralie, then captain and vicar general in the service of King Manfred of Sicily. He married the noblewoman Isabella of Ischia, daughter of Aldoino, Count of Ischia and Geraci, descendant of the Norman Serlo II of Altavilla, nephew of the Great Count Roger, and through this marriage he acquired possession of the County of Geraci.

Having become Marquesses of Geraci in 1436 with Giovanni I Ventimiglia, the first feudal lord to receive the title of Marquess on the island, they were granted numerous titles: Princes of Castelbuono from 1595, then Princes of the Holy Roman Empire, Princes of Belmonte, Grammonte, Scaletta, Belmontino, Valdina, Villadorata, Ventimiglia di Sicilia, Sant'Anna and Buonriposo.

The main Sicilian branch of the family, the firstborn line of the Ventimiglia di Geraci became extinct in the male line with Giovanni Luigi Ventimiglia Camarrone, 17th Prince of Castelbuono, who died in 1860 without descendants. The branch was recognized and received into the Sovereign Military Order of Malta and the Sacred Military Constantinian Order of Saint George.

=== Ventimiglia di Malaga ===
It derives from the Sicilian branch of the Ventimiglia di Geraci, and its founder was Bernardo Ventimiglia, son of Giovanni Antonio Ventimiglia, who participated in the Conquest of Malaga in 1487 and for this, the sovereign Ferdinand, King of Castile and Aragon gave him the lordship of Peñón de la Vega, which became a county in 1696.

They were Princes of San Mauro and Grandees of Spain, and became extinct in the 18th century.

=== Ventimiglia del Bosco ===
A Sicilian branch, it seems to have derived from the Ventimiglia del Maro, in particular from Raimondo, younger brother of Enrico, whose son Ottone called del Bosco, arrived in Trapani in the 13th century, married Giovanna Abbate, daughter of Gilberto, Castellan of Malta for the Emperor Frederick II of Swabia around 1241 – exponent of the most powerful noble clan of the city, thus becoming the brother-in-law of Palmerio Abbate, protagonist of the Sicilian Vespers, around the year 1282. Others maintain that it derived from an Enrico Ventimiglia, who in 1365 assumed the surname Del Bosco or Lo Bosco by privilege given to him by King Frederick III of Sicily, because he carried out an enterprise in a wood of Salemi against the Chiaramontani rebels.

They were Counts of Vicari, Dukes of Misilmeri, Barons of Prizzi and Siculiana, Knights of the Golden Fleece, as well as Princes of Cattolica and Belvedere. They also branched out into France and Spain.

=== Others ===
==== Ventimiglia di Belmonte ====
The branch derives from Francesco Ventimiglia Peralta (d. 1452), son of Antonio, Count of Collesano (son, in turn, of Francesco Ventimiglia, Count of Geraci), invested in 1418 with the Barony of Gratteri in the Madonie area. With Francesco Ventimiglia Rossel in 1658 they were adorned with the title of Princes of Belmonte, obtained through marriage from his wife Ninfa Afflitto Gaetani.

The Monroy family died out in the early decades of the 19th century. This branch included the intellectual Carlo Ventimiglia Grifeo, and the Bishops Antonino Ventimiglia and Salvatore Ventimiglia. The last prince was Gaetano Ventimiglia Maniaci di Belmonte, father of Marianna Ventimiglia Maniaci. In 1832, she married Don Ferdinando Monroy, Prince of Pandolfina. From their marriage, Gaetano Monroy Ventimiglia was born, who married Stefania Lanza, of the Princes of Trabia. The title of Prince of Belmonte was recognized to Marianna's great-grandson, Ferdinando Hardouin-Monroy, with a royal decree of 25 December 1925. The title of Prince of Belmonte ended up in the Hardouin-Monroy Ventimiglia household.

==== Ventimiglia di Grammonte ====
The princely branch of the Ventimiglia di Grammonte also derives from that of the Barons of Gratteri. They also had the title of Counts of Prades, Marquesses and Barons of Regiovanni (a title already held by the Ventimiglia family). The first to be invested with the title of Prince of Grammonte was Giovanni Luigi Ventimiglia Spinola on 1 December 1746, who inherited it from his maternal family. The titles of this branch were in turn divided into two: the male lineage continued into the following 20th century with the descendants of the brother Prince Carlo Antonio Ventimiglia Maniaci; the titles of Marquesses and Barons of Regiovanni, Counts of Prades, ended up in the house of Paternò di Spedalotto, to whose family Silvia Paternò-Ventimiglia di Spedalotto, member of the House of Savoy-Aosta, currently belongs.

==== Ventimiglia di Messina ====
Branch settled in the city of Messina, where it enjoyed nobility, boasts descent from the Marquesses of Geraci and specifically from the decorated branch of the Barony of Sinagra and from the 19th century branch of San Marco.

== Members of the family ==
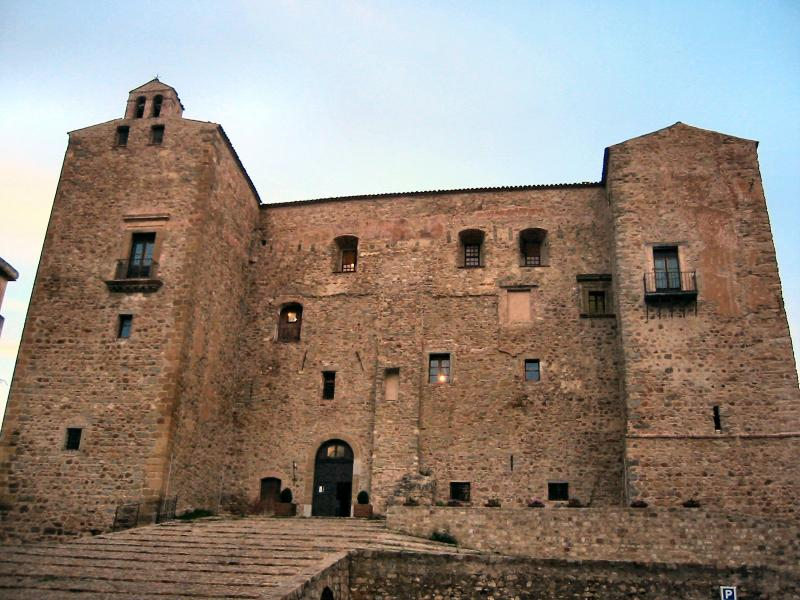
Castle of Castelbuono, near Palermo

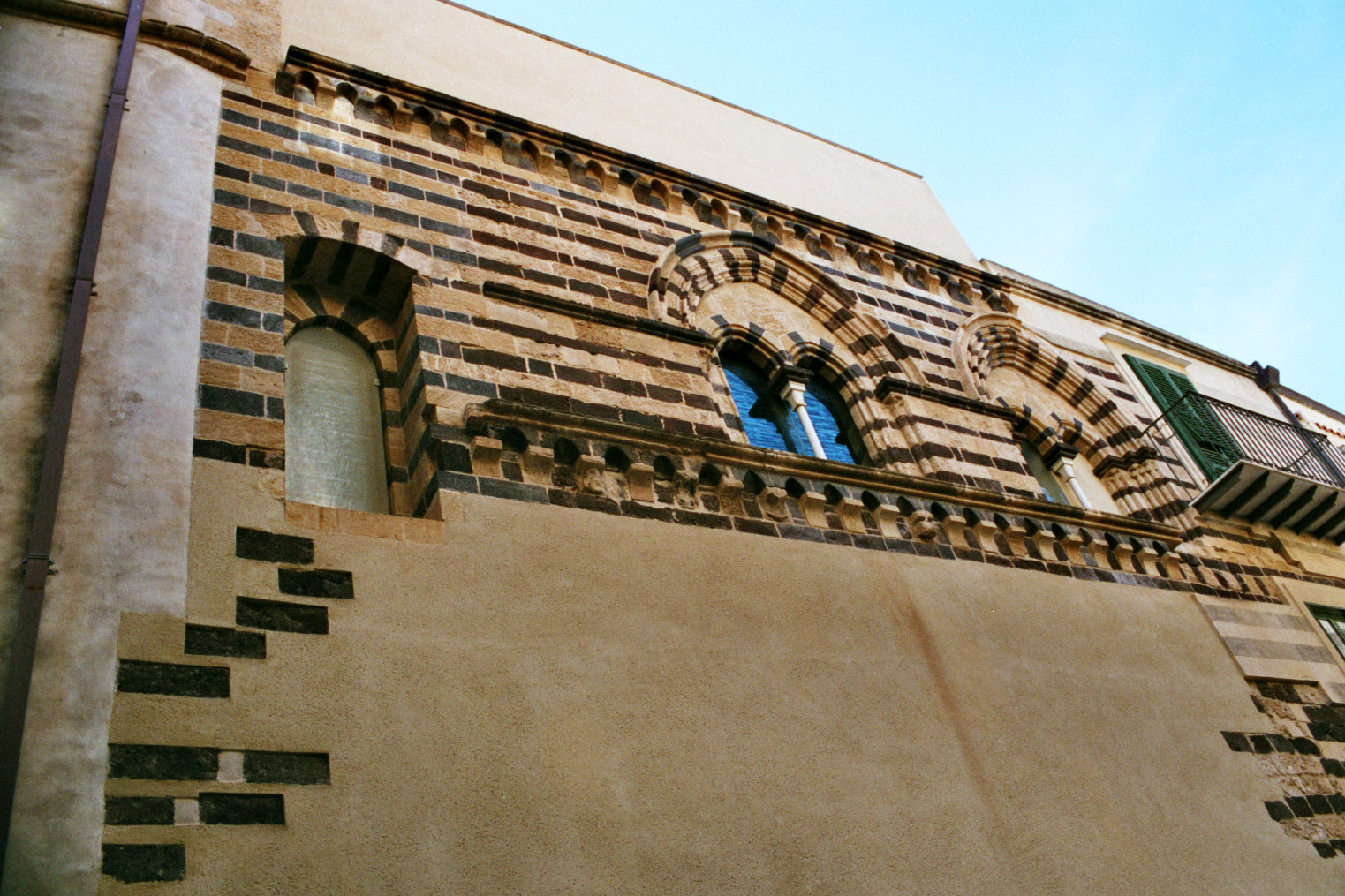
Stately "Osterio Magno", at Cefalù, chief town of sicilian dominion of Ventimiglia lineage. Built in the 13th century by count Enrico II Ventimiglia, general vicarious of Manfred, King of Sicily.

- Giovanni I Ventimiglia (1383–1475), 8th Count of Geraci (from 1405); Marquis of Geraci (from 1436); also Lord of Castelbuono, Tusa, Gangi, San Mauro (San Mauro Castelverde), Pollina, Caronia (from 1412), Cefalù, Sciacca, Termini Imerese, Count of Montesarchio, Bitonto, Casamassima, Serracapriola, Castellamare di Stabia, Orta Nova and Magliano, Baron of Ciminna..., Grande Ammiraglio del Regno (Grand Admiral of Sicily Kingdom), Viceroy of Sicily, 1430–1432, Governatore del Regno di Napoli (Governor of Naples Kingdom), 1435, Viceroy of the Duchy of Athens and Neopatras, 1444, Regent of the Kingdom of Naples, 1460, Captain General of the Church, 1445 and 1455.
- Giovanni II Ventimiglia, marquis of Geraci (1559–1619), Lord of Castelbuono, Gangi, Pollina, Pettineo and San Mauro, was acting Viceroy of Sicily from 1595 to 1598.
- Salvatore Ventimiglia (d. Palermo, April 1797), Bishop of Catania, son of the 3rd Prince of Belmonte
- Francesco I Ventimiglia
