= Carlo Galletti =

Italian footballer (1888-1915)

Personal information
- Full name: Carlo Galletti
- Date of birth: 1888
- Date of death: November 1915 (aged 26–27)
- Position: Defender

Senior career*
Years	Team	Apps	(Gls)
1905–1915	Andrea Doria	24	(?)

International career
1913	Italy	1	(0)
- * Club domestic league appearances and goals

Carlo Galletti (Italian pronunciation: [ˈkarlo ɡalˈletti]; 1888 – November 1915) was an Italian footballer who played as a defender. On 12 January 1913, he represented the Italy national football team on the occasion of a friendly match against France in a 1–0 away loss.
