= Galetti =

Galetti is an Italian surname. Notable people with the surname include:

- Carlo Galetti (1882–1949), Italian road racing cyclist
- Monica Galetti (born 1975), Samoan-born New Zealand chef
- Mauro Galetti (born 1974), Brazilian ecologist and conservation biologist
- Vincenzo Galetti (1926–1987), Italian trade unionist, politician and anti-fascist activist

== See also ==
- Galletti
- Galetti River
