= Ischia (town) =

- Comune
- Comune di Ischia
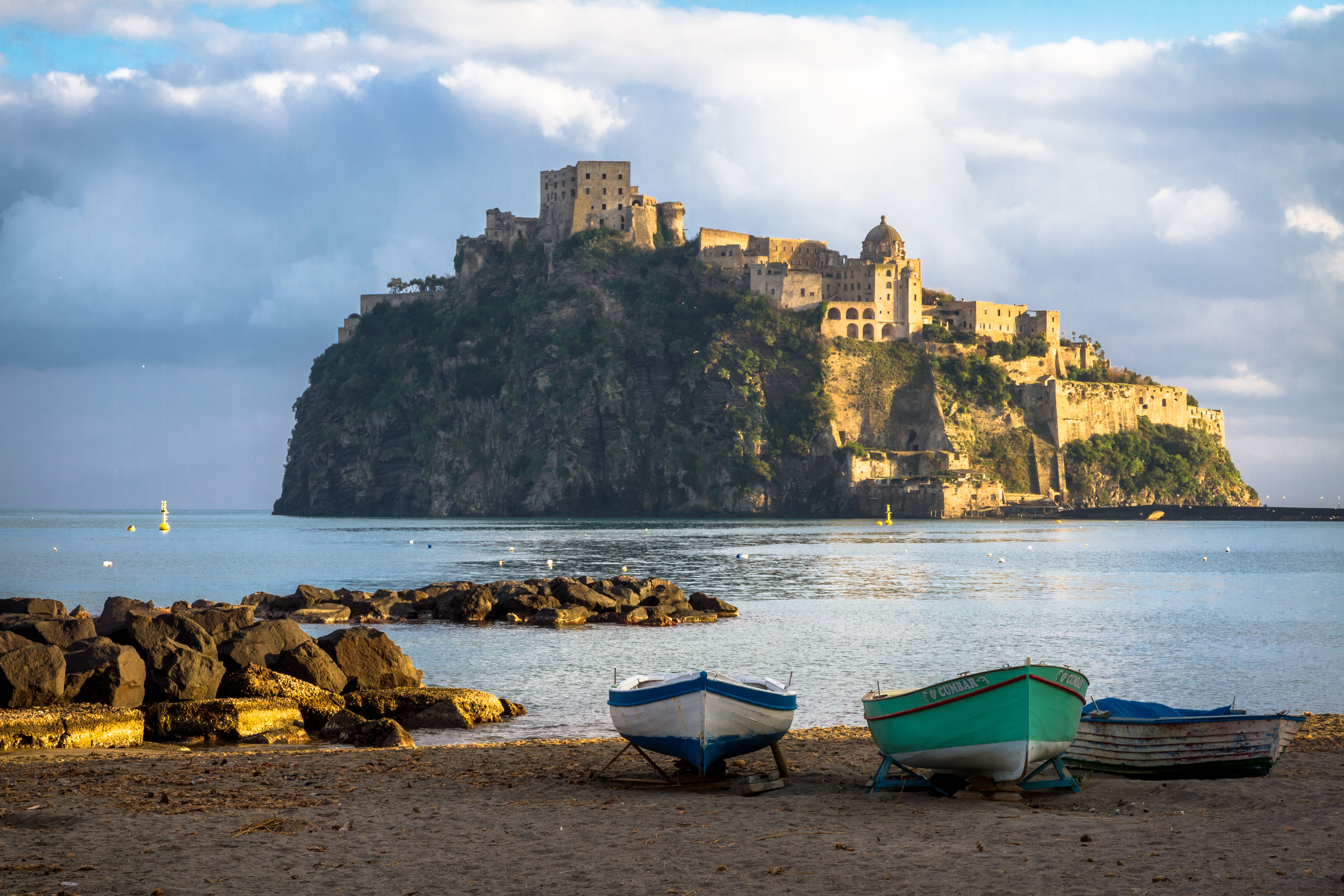
- View of Aragonese Castle from Spiaggia dei Pescatori

- Coat of arms

- Location within Italy Location within Campania
- Coordinates: 40°44′N 13°57′E
- Country: Italy
- Region: Campania
- Metropolitan city: Naples (NA)

Government
  - Mayor: Vincenzo Ferrandino

Area
  - Total: 8.14 km^{2} (3.14 sq mi)

Population (2026)
  - Total: 19,415
  - Density: 2,390/km^{2} (6,180/sq mi)
- Demonym: Ischitani
- Time zone: UTC+1 (CET)
  - Summer (DST): UTC+2 (CEST)
- Postal code: 80077
- Dialing code: 081
- Patron saint: St. Giovan Giuseppe della Croce
- Saint day: March 5
- Website: Official website

Ischia is a town and one of the six comuni (municipalities) on the island of Ischia in the Tyrrhenian Sea, administratively part of the Metropolitan City of Naples in the region of Campania in southern Italy. With a population of 19,415, it is the largest settlement on the island.

It is famed for its thermal baths due to the volcanic nature of the island.

The town is formed by two distinct districts, called "Ischia Porto" and "Ischia Ponte". The latter was named after an ancient wooden bridge (in Italian language, ponte) which, until the 18th century, connected it to the Aragonese Castle.

== Demographics ==
As of 2026, the population is 19,415, of which 49.5% are male, and 50.5% are female. Minors make up 14.5% of the population, and seniors make up 23.8%.

Historical population

Year	Pop.	±%
1861	6,241	—
1871	6,782	+8.7%
1881	6,564	−3.2%
1901	7,012	+6.8%
1911	7,197	+2.6%
1921	8,192	+13.8%
1931	8,842	+7.9%
1936	9,252	+4.6%

Year	Pop.	±%
1951	10,385	+12.2%
1961	11,416	+9.9%
1971	14,339	+25.6%
1981	16,038	+11.8%
1991	16,013	−0.2%
2001	18,253	+14.0%
2011	18,688	+2.4%
2021	19,542	+4.6%

Source: ISTAT

=== Immigration ===
As of 2025, immigrants make up 8.9% of the population. The 5 largest foreign countries of birth are the Dominican Republic, Ukraine, Romania, Germany, and Argentina.

== Twin towns – sister cities ==
- Marino, Italy
- San Pedro, California, United States
- Mar del Plata, Argentina
