= Aitona =

- Municipality
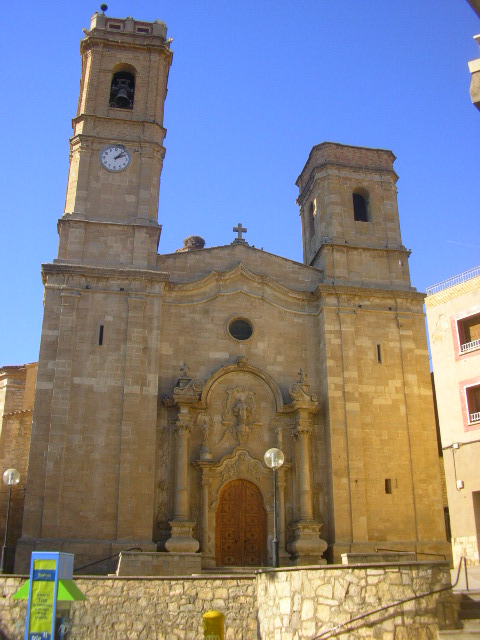
- Aitona parish church

- Flag Coat of arms

- Location in Catalonia
- Coordinates: 41.494°N 0.459°E
- Country: Spain
- Community: Catalonia
- Province: Lleida
- Comarca: Segrià

Government
  - Mayor: Rosa Pujol Esteve (2024)

Area
  - Total: 66.9 km^{2} (25.8 sq mi)
- Elevation: 110 m (360 ft)

Population (2025-01-01)
  - Total: 2,591
  - Density: 38.7/km^{2} (100/sq mi)
- Website: aitona.cat

Aitona (Catalan pronunciation: [ajˈtonɛ]) is a municipality in the comarca of Segrià in Catalonia, Spain. It has a population of 2,591 (register office, 2025). Its main industry is the agriculture.
