= Serlo II of Hauteville =

Norman soldier

Serlo of Hauteville (also spelled Sarlo, died 1072) was the son and namesake of Serlo of Hauteville. He followed his uncle Roger in Southern Italy and fought in his wars.

== Life ==
His father, Serlo I, didn't leave for Southern Italy as his brothers did, but instead remained in Normandy to inherit his father Tancred's possessions.

Serlo followed his uncle, Roger I of Sicily, to Calabria, and took part in the many expeditions for the conquest of Sicily against the Saracens. By 1063, Serlo had already become one of his uncle's most able commanders. He participated in the siege of Cerami, commanding thirty knights, and in 1072 he also attacked Enna for over six months to prevent the Saracens from sending help to Palermo, that his uncle Roger had conquered. When the Sicilian conquest was ultimate, Roger was given the title of Grand Count of Sicily, and his lieutenants, including Serlo and Ansgot of Pucheuil, were given some fiefs.

Serlo, however, didn't live long enough to settle in his fief. In 1072 he was betrayed by his Muslim friend Ibrahim, and he was ambushed by the Saracens near Nicosia, with some of his men. He fought to the last man, climbing onto a rock and refusing to die without fighting. When he was finally killed, his heart was supposedly pulled from his chest and eaten, and his head was sent to the Zirid sultan, Tamim ibn al-Mu'izz. The rock on which he died was remembered as the "Pietra di Serlone" or "Rocca di Sarro" (both meaning "Serlo's rock"), and a cross was raised upon it. John Julius Norwich lets us know that while he was writing his book, "The Normans in the South" (published 1967), a construction firm was demolishing the rock.

== Marriage ==
Serlo married a daughter of Rudolph, count of Boiano, and his wife Altruda, whose name is unknown. When he died, his widow was remarried to Ingelmarius by Roger I of Sicily.
