= Duomo of San Giorgio =

Duomo of San Giorgio or Duomo di San Giorgio may refer to:

- Duomo of San Giorgio, Modica
- Duomo of San Giorgio, Ragusa
