= Andrea Palma =

Andrea Palma may refer to:

- Andrea Palma (architect)
- Andrea Palma (actress)
