= Sicilian Baroque =

Baroque architectural style from Sicily

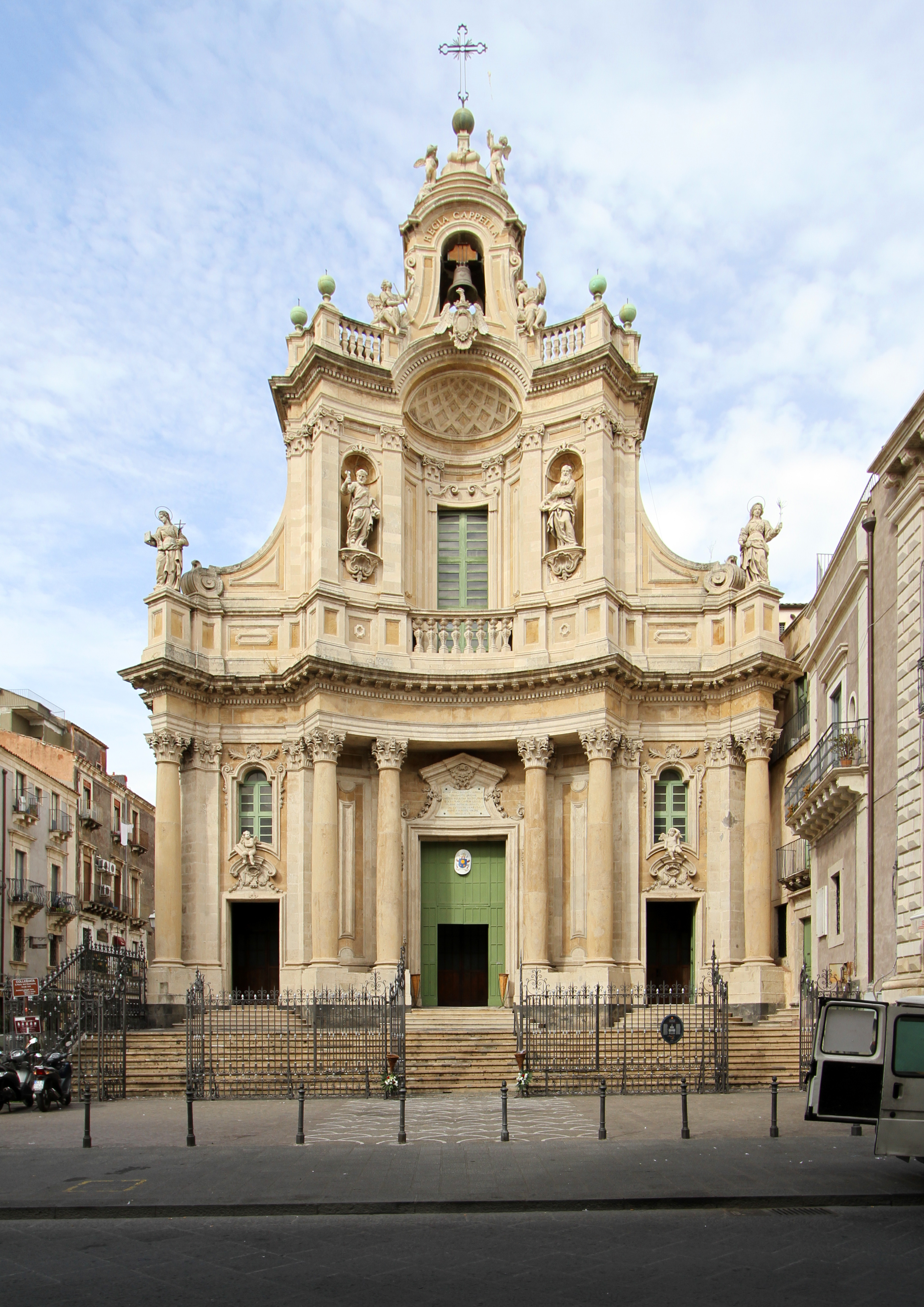
Illustration 1: Sicilian Baroque. Basilica della Collegiata in Catania, designed by Stefano Ittar, c. 1768.

Sicilian Baroque is the distinctive form of Baroque architecture which evolved on the island of Sicily, off the southern coast of Italy, in the 17th and 18th centuries, when it was part of the Spanish Empire. The style is recognisable not only by its typical Baroque curves and flourishes, but also by distinctive grinning masks and putti and a particular flamboyance that has given Sicily a unique architectural identity.

The Sicilian Baroque style came to fruition during a major surge of rebuilding following the massive earthquake in 1693. Previously, the Baroque style had been used on the island in a naïve and parochial manner, having evolved from hybrid native architecture rather than being derived from the great Baroque architects of Rome. After the earthquake, local architects, many of them trained in Rome, were given plentiful opportunities to recreate the more sophisticated Baroque architecture that had become popular in mainland Italy; the work of these local architects – and the new genre of architectural engravings that they pioneered – inspired more local architects to follow their lead. Around 1730, Sicilian architects had developed a confidence in their use of the Baroque style. Their particular interpretation led to further evolution to a personalised and highly localised art form on the island. From the 1780s onwards, the style was gradually replaced by the newly fashionable neoclassicism.

The highly decorative Sicilian Baroque period lasted barely fifty years, and perfectly reflected the social order of the island at a time when, nominally ruled by Spain, it was in fact governed by a wealthy and often extravagant aristocracy into whose hands ownership of the primarily agricultural economy was highly concentrated. Its Baroque architecture gives the island an architectural character that has survived into the 21st century.

== Characteristics ==
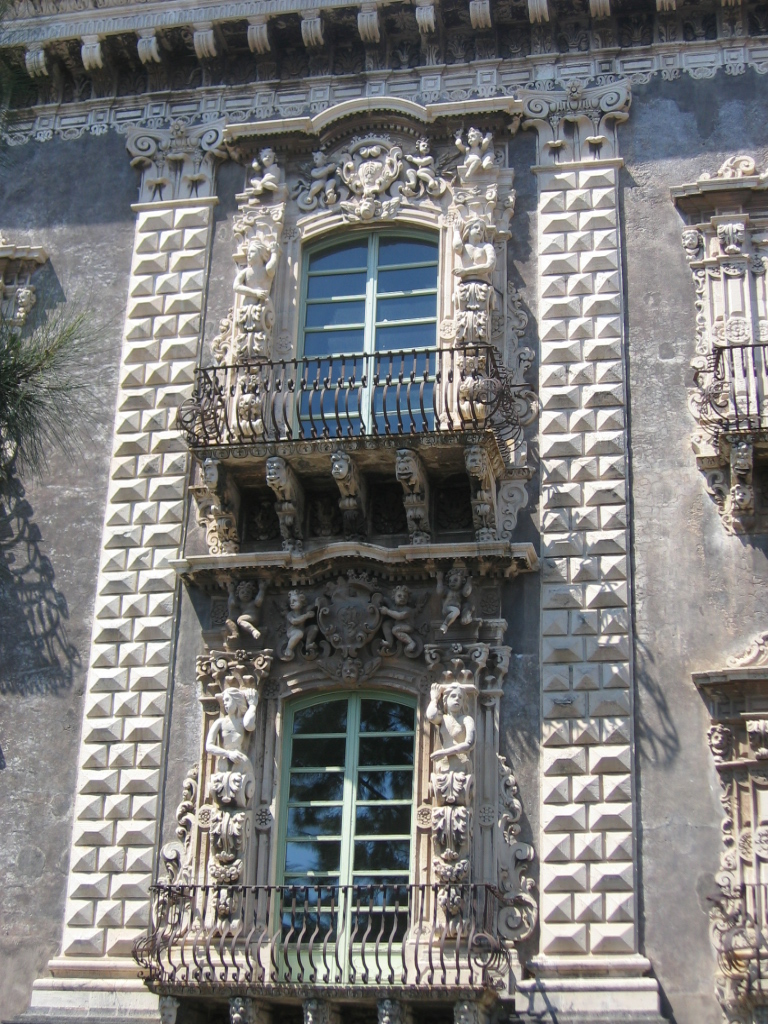
Illustration 2: University of Catania, designed by Vaccarini and completed by 1752, exemplifies typical Sicilian Baroque, with putti supporting the balcony, wrought iron balustrades, decorated rustication and two-tone lava masonry – a reversal of the more conventional rusticated walls and smooth pilasters

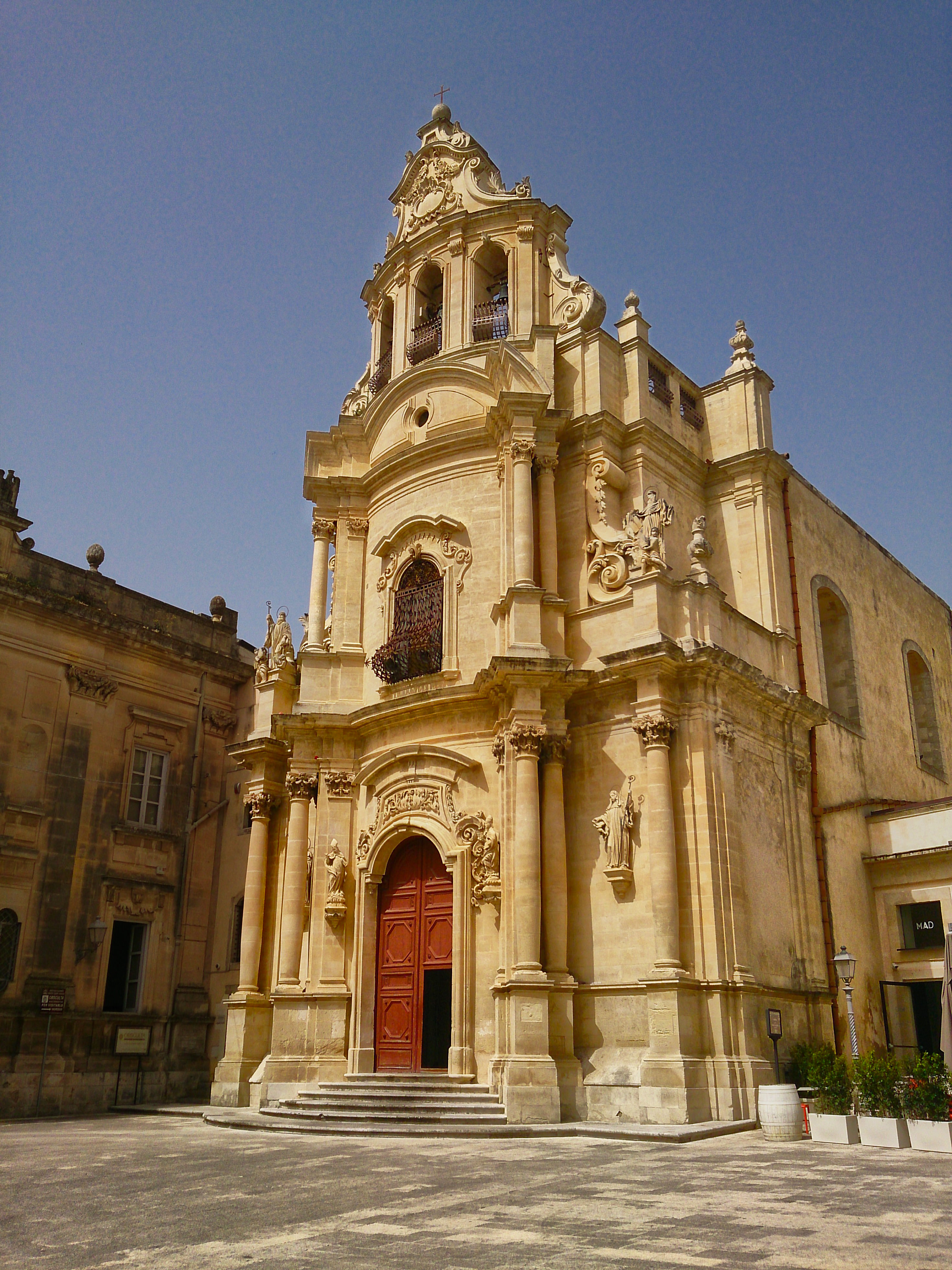
Illustration 3: A Sicilian belfry crowns Rosario Gagliardi's Church of San Giuseppe in Ragusa Ibla

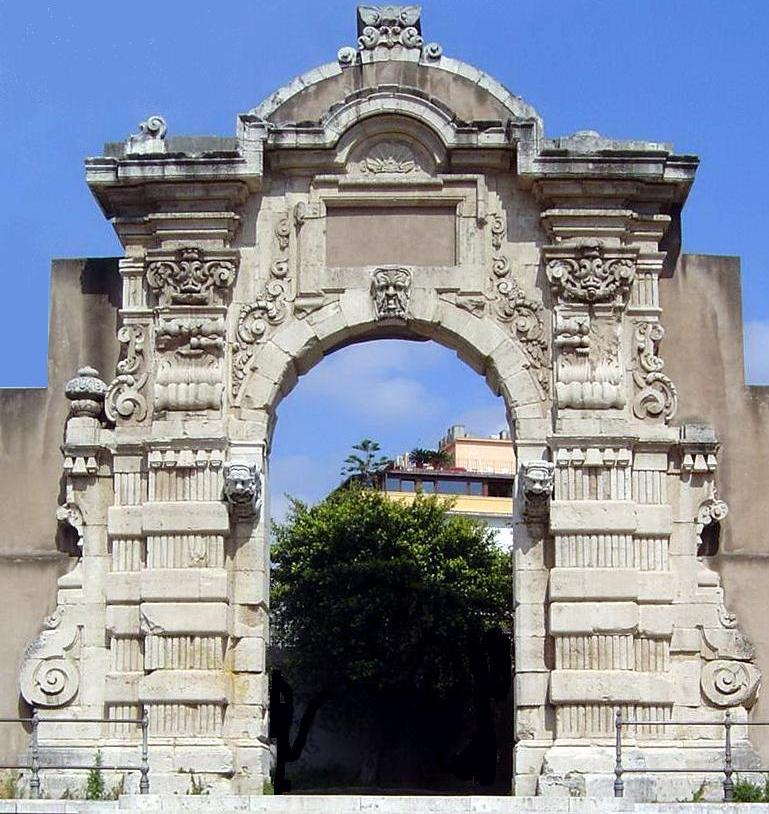
Illustration 4: Messina's Porta Grazia, with its mouldings, scrolls and masks was widely copied all over Catania immediately following the quake.

Baroque architecture is a European phenomenon originating in 17th-century Italy; it is flamboyant and theatrical, and richly ornamented by architectural sculpture and an effect known as chiaroscuro, the strategic use of light and shade on a building created by mass and shadow.

The Baroque style in Sicily was largely confined to buildings erected by the church, and palazzi, the private residences for the Sicilian aristocracy. (Note: Palazzo (pl. palazzi) is any large building in a town, state or private (often much smaller than what the English term palace implies). While palazzo is the technically correct appellation, and postal address, no Sicilian aristocrat would ever use the word, instead referring to his or her own house, however large, as casa. Palazzo followed by the family name was the term used by officials, tradesmen, and delivery men.) The earliest examples of this style in Sicily lacked individuality and were typically heavy-handed pastiches of buildings seen by Sicilian visitors to Rome, Florence, and Naples. However, even at this early stage, provincial architects had begun to incorporate certain vernacular features of Sicily's older architecture. By the middle of the 18th century, when Sicily's Baroque architecture was noticeably different from that of the mainland, it typically included at least two or three of the following features, coupled with a unique freedom of design that is more difficult to characterise in words:

1. Grotesque masks and putti, often supporting balconies or decorating various bands of the entablature of a building; these grinning or glaring faces are a relic of Sicilian architecture from before the mid-17th century (Illustrations 2 and 9).
2. Balconies, often complemented by intricate wrought iron balustrades after 1633 (Illustrations 2 and 9), and by plainer balustrades before that date (Illustration 6).
3. External staircases. Most villas and palazzi were designed for formal entrance by a carriage through an archway in the street façade, leading to a courtyard within. An intricate double staircase would lead from the courtyard to the piano nobile. This would be the palazzo's principal entrance to the first-floor reception rooms; the symmetrical flights of steps would turn inwards and outwards as many as four times. Owing to the topography of their elevated sites it was often necessary to approach churches by many steps; these steps were often transformed into long straight marble staircases, in themselves decorative architectural features (illustration 19), in the manner of the Spanish Steps in Rome.
4. Canted, concave, or convex façades (Illustrations 1 and 6). Occasionally in a villa or palazzo, an external staircase would be fitted into the recess created by the curve.
5. The Sicilian belfry. Belfries were not placed beside the church in a campanile tower as is common in Italy, but on the façade itself, often surmounting the central pediment, with one or more bells clearly displayed beneath its own arch, such as at Catania's Collegiata (Illustration 1). In a large church with many bells this usually resulted in an intricately sculpted and decorated arcade at the highest point of the principal façade (Illustration 3). These belfries are among the most enduring and characteristic features of Sicilian Baroque architecture.
6. Inlaid coloured marble set into both floor and walls, especially in church interiors. This particular form of intarsia developed in Sicily from the 17th century (see the floor of illustration 14).
7. Columns that are often deployed singularly, supporting plain arches and thus displaying the influence of the earlier and much plainer Norman period (Illustration 3). Columns are rarely encountered, as elsewhere in Europe, in clustered groups acting as piers, especially in examples of early Sicilian Baroque.
8. Decorated rustication. Sebastiano Serlio had decorated the blocks of ashlar in his rustication; by the end of the 16th century, Sicilian architects were ornamenting the blocks with carvings of leaves, fish-scales, and even sweets and shells; shells were later to become among the most prevalent ornamental symbols of Baroque design. Sometimes the rustication would be used for pillars rather than walls, a reversal of expectations and almost an architectural joke.(illustration 2)
9. The local volcanic lava stone that was used in the construction of many Sicilian Baroque buildings, because this was the most readily available. Many sculptors and stone-cutters of the period lived at the foot of Mount Etna, making a diversity of objects, including balustrades, pillars, fountains and seats for buildings. Shades of black or grey were used to create contrasting decorative effects, accentuating the Baroque love of light and shade (chiaroscuro) as demonstrated in (illustration 2).
10. European influence :
- The Spanish influence. The architectural influence of the ruling Spanish (Illustration 13), although this was a milder influence than that of the Normans. The Spanish style, a more restrained version of French Renaissance architecture, is particularly evident in eastern Sicily, where, owing to minor insurrections, the Spanish maintained a stronger military presence. Messina's 16th-century Porta Grazia (Illustrations 4), built as the entrance to a Spanish Real Cittadella, would not be out of place in any of the towns and citadels built by the Spanish in their colonies elsewhere. The style of this arched city gate, with its ornate mouldings, scrolls and masks was widely copied all over Catania immediately following the earthquake, with many of its features becoming motifs of the Sicilian Baroque.
- Influence of the Austrian and German Baroque.
- Influence of the French Baroque and the styles that dominated the court of Versailles.
- Influence of taste, art and above all British architecture; due to the strong ties that have linked Sicily to England for a long time; especially the aristocracy

While these characteristics never occur all together in the same building, and none are unique to Sicilian Baroque, it is the coupling together which gives the Sicilian Baroque its distinctive air. Other Baroque characteristics, such as broken pediments over windows, the extravagant use of statuary, curved topped windows and doors and flights of external stairs are all emblematic of Baroque architecture, and can all be found on Baroque buildings all over Europe.

== Early Sicilian Baroque ==
Sicily, a volcanic island in the central Mediterranean, off the Italian Peninsula, was colonised by the Greeks, and then ruled by the Romans, the Byzantines, the Ostrogoths, the Muslims, the Normans, the Hohenstaufen, the Angevins, and the Aragonese. It then became a province of the Spanish Empire and later was part of the Bourbon Kingdom of the Two Sicilies, before finally being absorbed into the Kingdom of Italy in 1860. Thus, Sicilians have been exposed to a rich sequence of disparate cultures, which is reflected in the extraordinary diversity of architecture on the island.

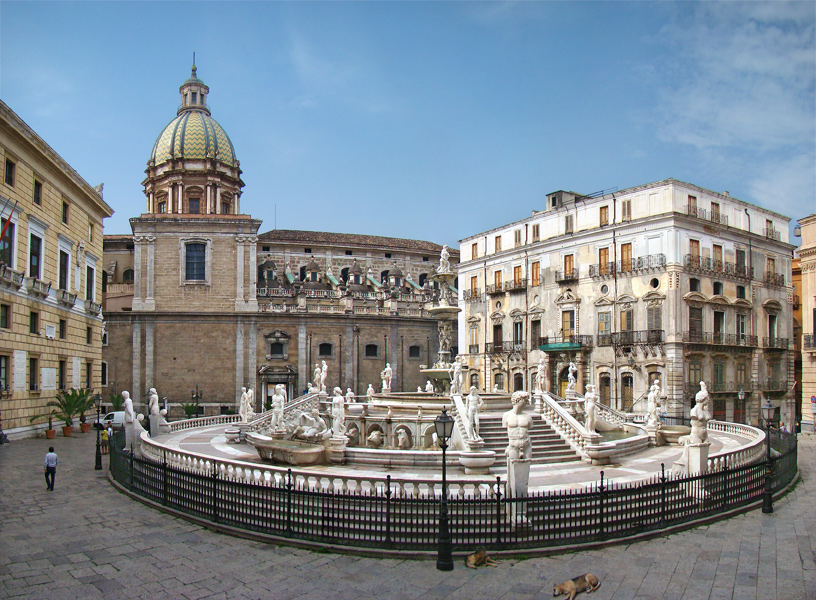
Illustration 5: Piazza Pretoria, Palermo. The Fontana Pretoria (circa 1554) by Francesco Camilliani is a rare example of high Renaissance architecture in the capital city. Behind the fountain is the Church of Santa Caterina (circa 1556), with its spectacular Baroque dome (which was added later).

A form of decorated classical architecture peculiar to Sicily had begun to evolve from the 1530s. Inspired by the ruined Greek architecture and by the Norman cathedrals on the island, this often incorporated Greek architectural motifs such as the Greek key pattern into late Norman architecture with Gothic features such as pointed arches and window apertures. The Sicilian Norman architecture incorporated some Byzantine elements seldom found in Norman architecture elsewhere, and like other Romanesque architecture it went on to incorporate Gothic features. This early ornate architecture differs from that of mainland Europe in not having evolved from Renaissance architecture; instead, it was developed from Norman styles. Renaissance architecture hardly touched Sicily; in the capital city of Palermo, the only remnant of the High Renaissance is the Fontana Pretoria, a water fountain originally made for Don Pietro di Toleda by Florentine artists Franscesco Cammilliani and Michelangelo Naccerino and brought to Sicily when it was already 20 years old (Illustration 5).

Whatever the reason that Renaissance style never became popular in Sicily, it was certainly not ignorance. Antonello Gagini was midway through constructing the Church of Santa Maria di Porto Salvo in 1536 in the Renaissance style when he died; he was superseded by the architect Antonio Scaglione, who completed the building in a Norman style. This style seems to have influenced Sicilian architecture almost up to the time of the 1693 earthquake. Even Mannerism passed the island by. Only in the architecture of Messina (Note: Messina, once Sicily's second city, fell into poverty and obscurity following punitive measures against it by the Spanish following an uprising in 1626. Closely related for geographical reasons to mainland Italy, Messina once contained some of Sicily's finest buildings. The combined effect of earthquakes in 1693, 1783 and 1908, and bombing raids in 1943, robbed the city of virtually all of these.) could a Renaissance influence be discerned, partly for geographical reasons: within sight of mainland Italy and the most important port in Sicily, Messina was always more amenable to the prevailing tides of fashion outside the island. The town's aristocratic patrons would often call on Florence or Rome to provide them with an architect; one example was the Florentine Giovanni Angelo Montorsoli, who established the Tuscan styles of architecture and sculpture there in the mid-16th century. However, these influences remained largely confined to Messina and the surrounding district. The patronage of the Roman Catholic Church, removed from the influences of Roman fashion, remained conservative in architectural taste and far-reaching in its power.

This is not to say that Sicily was completely isolated from trends elsewhere in Europe. Architecture in the island's major cities was strongly influenced by the family of the sculptor Domenico Gagini, who arrived from Florence in 1463. This family of sculptors and painters decorated churches and buildings with ornate decorative and figurative sculpture. Less than a century after his family had begun to cautiously decorate the island's churches (1531–1537), Antonello Gagini completed the proscenium-like arch of the "Capella della Madonna" in the "Santuario dell'Annunziata" at Trapani. This pedimented arch to the sanctuary has pilasters – not fluted, but decorated heavily with relief busts of the saints; and, most importantly in terms of architecture, the pediment is adorned by reclining saints supporting swags linked to the central shield that crowns the pediment. This ornate pediment, although still unbroken, was one of the first signs that Sicily was forming its own style of decorative architecture. Similar in style is the Chiesa del Gesù (Illustration 14), constructed between 1564 and 1633, which also shows early signs of the Sicilian Baroque.

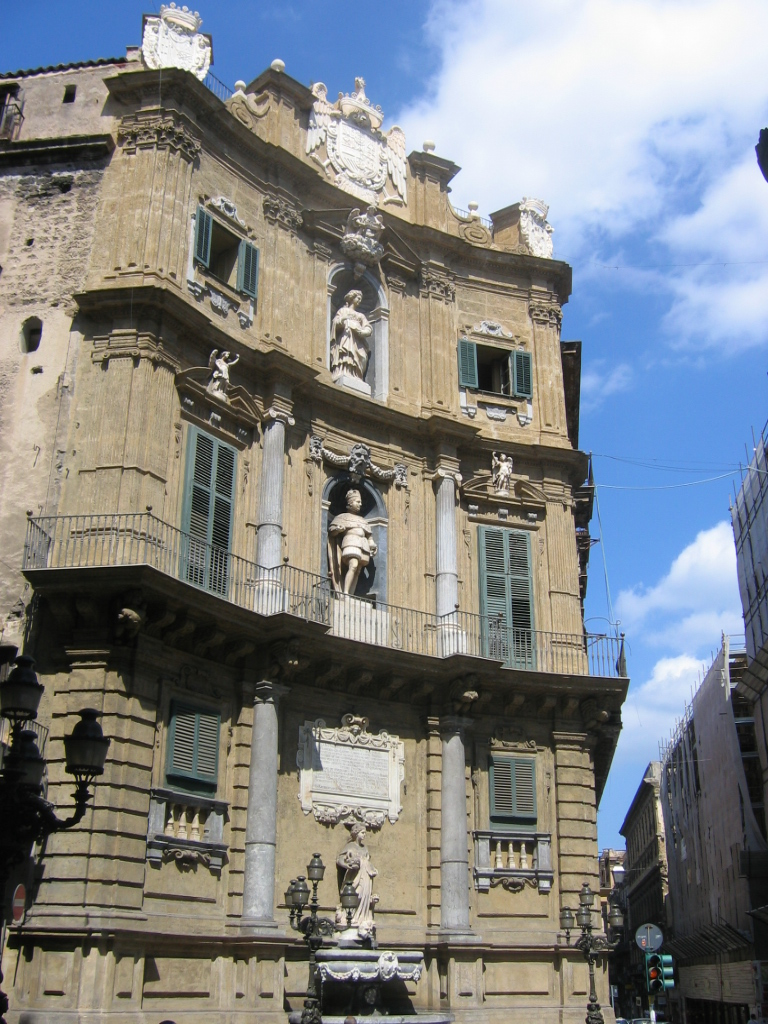
Illustration 6: Early Sicilian Baroque: Quattro Canti, Palermo, (circa 1610)

Thus, a particular brand of Baroque architecture had begun to evolve in Sicily long before the earthquake of 1693. While the majority of those buildings that can be clearly classified as Baroque in style date from around 1650, the scarcity of these isolated, surviving examples of Sicily's 17th-century architectural history makes it hard to fully and accurately evaluate the architecture immediately before the natural disaster: the earthquake destroyed not only most of the buildings, but also most of their documentation. Yet more has been lost in subsequent earthquakes and severe bombing during World War II.

The earliest example of Baroque on the island is Giulio Lasso's Quattro Canti, an octagonal piazza, or circus, constructed around 1610 at the intersection of the city's two principal streets. Around this intersection are four open sides, being the streets, and four matching buildings with identical canted corners. The sides of the four buildings are curved, further heightening the Baroque design of the buildings lining the circus. These four great buildings dominating the circus are each enhanced by a fountain, reminiscent of those of Pope Sixtus V's Quattro Fontane in Rome. However, in Palermo the Baroque theme continues up three storeys of the buildings, which are adorned with statues in recessed niches depicting the four seasons, the four Spanish kings of Sicily, and the four patronesses of Palermo: Saints Cristina, Ninfa, Olivia, and Agata.

While each façade of Quattro Canti is pleasing to the eye, as a scheme it is both out of proportion with the limited size of the piazza and, like most other examples of early Sicilian Baroque, can be considered provincial, naive and heavy-handed, compared with later developments. Whatever its merit, it is evident that during the 17th century the Baroque style in the hands of the local architects and sculptors was already deviating from that of mainland Italy. This localised variation on the mainstream Baroque was not peculiar to Sicily, but occurred as far afield as Bavaria and Russia, where Naryshkin Baroque would be just as eccentric as its Sicilian cousin.

== Sicilian Baroque from 1693 ==
=== Earthquake and patrons ===
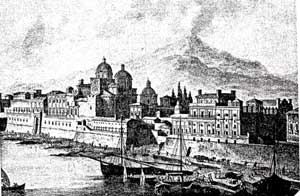
Illustration 7: Catania and the Palazzo Biscari, begun in 1702. Catania replaced Messina as Sicily's second city after the revolt of 1686.

The great Sicilian earthquake of 11 January 1693 destroyed at least 45 towns and cities, affecting an area of 5,600 square kilometres (2,200 sq mi) and causing the deaths of about 60,000 people. The epicentre of the disaster was offshore, although the exact position remains unknown. Towns which suffered severely were Ragusa, Modica, Scicli, and Ispica. Rebuilding began almost immediately.

The lavishness of the architecture that was to arise from this disaster is connected with the politics of Sicily at the time: Sicily was still officially under Spanish rule, but rule was effectively delegated to the native aristocracy. This was led by the Duke of Camastra, whom the Spanish had appointed viceroy to appease the aristocracy, who were numerous. The aristocracy was relatively concentrated compared to most of Europe, and a gentry class was missing. In the 18th century, one estimate held that there were 228 noble families, who provided Sicily with a ruling class consisting of 58 princes, 27 dukes, 37 marquesses, 26 counts, one viscount and 79 barons; the Golden Book of the Sicilian nobility (last published in 1926) lists even more. In addition to these were the younger scions of the families, with their courtesy titles of nobile or baron. (Note: Patrick Brydone, who travelled to Sicily in 1770, recorded his impressions of the local nobility in A Tour through Sicily and Malta, in a Series of Letters to William Beckford Esq., of Somerly in Suffolk: "One of the most common titles here is that of prince; though only created by Philip II of Spain, they take rank of all the other nobility, some of whom, particularly the counts, carry their origin as far back as the Normans, and look with great contempt on these upstart princes. The dukes and marquisses are not so old, so that the dignity of the Sicilian titles may be said to be in the inverse ratio of their antiquity".)

Architecture was not the only legacy of the Normans. Rule over the peasants (there was no established middle class) was also enforced by a feudal system, unchanged since its introduction following the Norman conquest of 1071. Thus, the Sicilian aristocracy had at their command not only wealth but vast manpower, something that had by this time declined in many other parts of Europe. As in Southern Spain, the huge rural estates remained almost as concentrated as when they had been Roman latifundi. The Sicilian economy, though very largely agriculturally based, was very strong, and became more so during the 18th century as shipping became more efficient and the threat of Muslim piracy died away. The export markets for lemons (for the great 18th century fashion for lemonade) and wines increased greatly, and Sicilian wheat remained, as it had been since Roman times, the backbone of the economy. The disaster that was to give Sicily its modern reputation of poverty, namely the opening-up of the American Midwest to wheat-farming, was a century away. When it came, this permanently cut the price of wheat to less than half, and destroyed the old economy forever.

The aristocracy shared their power only with the Roman Catholic Church. The Church ruled by fear of damnation in the next life and of the Inquisition in the present, and consequently both upper and lower classes gave as generously as they could on all major saints' days. Many priests and bishops were members of the aristocracy. The wealth of the Church in Sicily was further enhanced by the tradition of pressing younger children of the aristocracy to enter monasteries and convents, in order to preserve the family estates from division; however, this was seldom a cheap option as expenses and an ongoing "onerous maintenance" had to be paid to the Church. Thus, the wealth of certain religious orders grew out of all proportion to the economic growth of any other group at this time. This is one of the reasons that so many of the Sicilian Baroque churches and monasteries, such as San Martino delle Scale, were rebuilt after 1693 on such a lavish scale.

Once rebuilding began, the poor rebuilt their basic housing in the same primitive fashion as before. By contrast, the wealthiest residents, both secular and spiritual, became caught in an almost manic orgy of building. Most members of the nobility had several homes in Sicily. (Note: Giuseppe Tomasi di Lampedusa, author of The Leopard, wrote of his family's six homes: a townhouse in Palermo, a villa at Bagheria, a palazzo at Toretta, a country house at Reitano, a "great" castle at Santa Marherita de Belice, and "two where we never went": a castle and house at Palma de Montechiaro ("I luoghi della mia prima infanzia" ["Places of my Infancy"]).) For one thing, the Spanish viceroy spent six months of the year in Palermo and six in Catania, holding court in each city, and hence members of the aristocracy needed a town palazzo in each city. A parallel Baroque style adapted to earthquake conditions, called Earthquake Baroque, also developed in the earthquake-prone Spanish colonies of Guatemala and the Philippines and the Spanish administrations there gave their expertise and input to the Spanish and Sicilians in the construction of Sicilian Baroque. Once the palazzi in devastated Catania were rebuilt in the new fashion, the palazzi in Palermo seemed antiquated by comparison, so they too were eventually rebuilt. Following this, from the middle of the 18th century, villas to retire to in the autumn, essentially status symbols, were built at the fashionable enclave at Bagheria. This pattern was repeated, on a smaller scale, throughout the lesser cities of Sicily, each city providing a more entertaining social life and a magnetic draw for the provincial aristocrat than their country estate. The country estate also did not escape the building mania. Often Baroque wings or new façades were added to ancient castles, or country villas were completely rebuilt. Thus, the frenzy of building gained momentum until the increasingly fantastical Baroque architecture demanded by these hedonistic patrons reached its zenith in the mid-18th century.

=== New cities ===
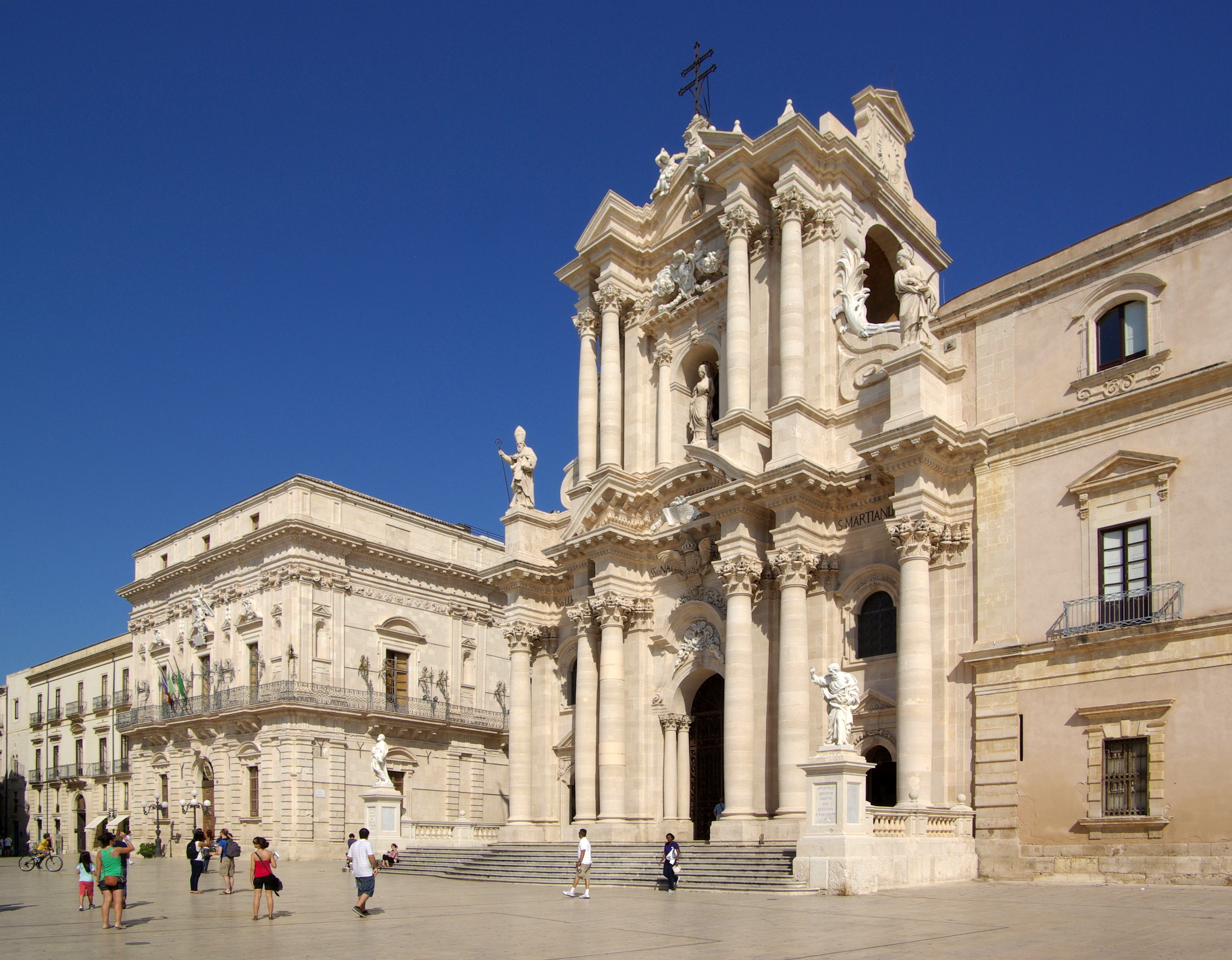
Illustration 8: Piazza del Duomo, Syracuse. Andrea Palma's Cathedral of Syracuse (see illustration 11 below) is flanked by Baroque palazzi.

Following the earthquake, a program of rebuilding was rapidly put into action, but before it began in earnest some important decisions were made that would permanently differentiate many Sicilian cities and towns from other European urban developments. The Viceroy, the Duke of Camastra, aware of new trends in town planning, decreed that rather than rebuilding in the medieval plan of cramped narrow streets, the new rebuilding would offer piazze and wider main streets, often on a rational grid plan. The whole plan was often to take a geometric shape such as a perfect square or a hexagon, typical of Renaissance and Baroque town planning. The city of Grammichele is an example of these new cities rebuilt to a hexagonal plan.

This concept was still very new in the 1690s, and few new cities had had reason to be built in Europe – Christopher Wren's city plan after the Great Fire of London in 1666 having been turned down because of the complexities of land ownership there. There were some other examples such as Richelieu, and later Saint Petersburg. The prototype may well have been the new city of Terra del Sole, constructed in 1564. Another of the first towns to be planned using symmetry and order rather than an evolution of small alleys and streets was Alessandria in southern Piedmont. A little later, from 1711, this Baroque form of planning was favoured in the Hispanic colonies of South America, especially by the Portuguese in Brazil. In other parts of Europe, lack of finance, complex land ownership and divided public opinion made radical replanning after disaster too difficult: after 1666, London was rebuilt on its ancient plan, though new extensions to the west were partially on a grid system. In Sicily, public opinion (that of anyone outside the ruling class) counted for nothing, and hence these seemingly revolutionary new concepts of town planning could be freely executed. (Note: Stephen Tobriner, in his study The Genesis of Noto: An Eighteenth-Century Italian City, describes the process leading to the drastic decision to "move" Noto.)

In Sicily, the decision was taken not just for fashion and appearance but also because it would minimise the damage to property and life likely to be caused in future quakes. In 1693, the cramped housing and streets had caused buildings to collapse together like dominoes. Although after the earthquake the avenues were broadened and the density of housing was lowered overall, cramped and narrow areas of housing still remained, posing a hazard for the poor. Architecturally and aesthetically, the big advantage of the new order of town planning was that unlike many Italian towns and cities, where one frequently encounters a monumental Renaissance church squeezed terrace-fashion between incongruous neighbours, in urban Baroque design one can step back and actually see the architecture in a more conducive setting in relation to its proportions and perspective. This is most notable in the largely rebuilt towns of Caltagirone, Militello in Val di Catania, Catania, Modica, Noto, Palazzolo Acreide, Ragusa, and Scicli.

One of the finest examples of this new urban planning can be seen at Noto (Illustration 9), the town rebuilt approximately 7 kilometres (4.3 mi) from its original site on Mount Alveria. The old ruined town now known as "Noto Antica" can still be viewed in its ruinous state. The new site chosen was flatter than the old to better facilitate a linear grid-like plan. The principal streets run east to west so they would benefit from a better light and a sunnier disposition. (Note: Travelling in Sicily in the early 1920s, the writer Sacheverell Sitwell recorded his astonishment; "It must have been in the winter of 1922-3 that I went to Noto. Its beautiful buildings were even more of a revelation than those of Lecce and I really believe that my brother and myself were the first persons of any nationality to take notice of them since they were built".) This example of town planning is directly attributable to a learned local aristocrat, Giovanni Battista Landolina; helped by three local architects, he is credited with planning the new city himself.

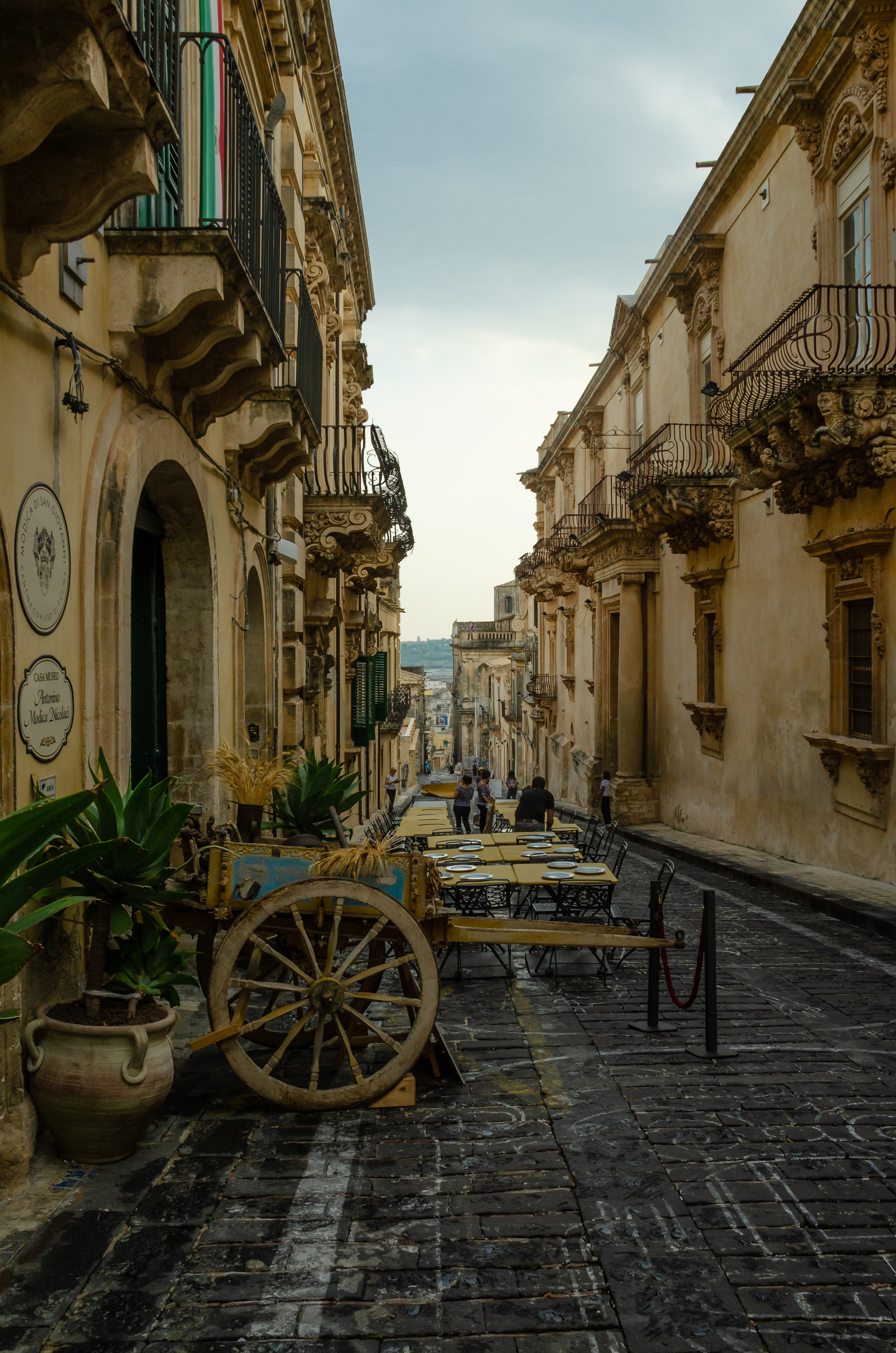
Illustration 9: Via Nicolasi, Noto

In these new towns, the aristocracy was allocated the higher areas, where the air was cooler and fresher and the views finest. The church was placed in the town centre (Illustration 8), both for convenience to all and to reflect the church's global and central position; round the pairing of cathedral and episcopal palazzo vescovile were built the convents. The merchants and storekeepers chose their lots on the planned wider streets leading from the main piazza. Finally, the poor were allowed to erect their simple brick huts and houses in the areas nobody else wanted. Lawyers, doctors, and members of the few professions including the more skilled artisans – those who fell between the strictly defined upper and lower class – and were able to afford building plots, often lived on the periphery of the commercial and upper class residential sectors, but equally often these people just lived in a larger or grander house than their neighbours in the poorer areas. However, many of the skilled artists working on the rebuilding lived as part of the extended households of their patrons. In this way Baroque town planning came to symbolise and reflect political authority, and later its style and philosophy spread as far as Annapolis and Savannah in English America, and most notably Haussmann's 19th century re-designing of Paris. The stage was now set for the explosion of Baroque architecture, which was to predominate in Sicily until the early 19th century.

Later, many other Sicilian towns and cities which had been either little damaged or completely untouched by the earthquake, such as Palermo, were also transformed by the Baroque style, as the fashion spread and aristocrats with a palazzo in Catania came to wish their palazzo in the capital were as opulent as that in the second city. In Palermo the Church of Santa Caterina, began in 1566, was one of many in the city to be redecorated inside in the 18th century in the Baroque style, with coloured marbles.

=== New churches and palazzi ===
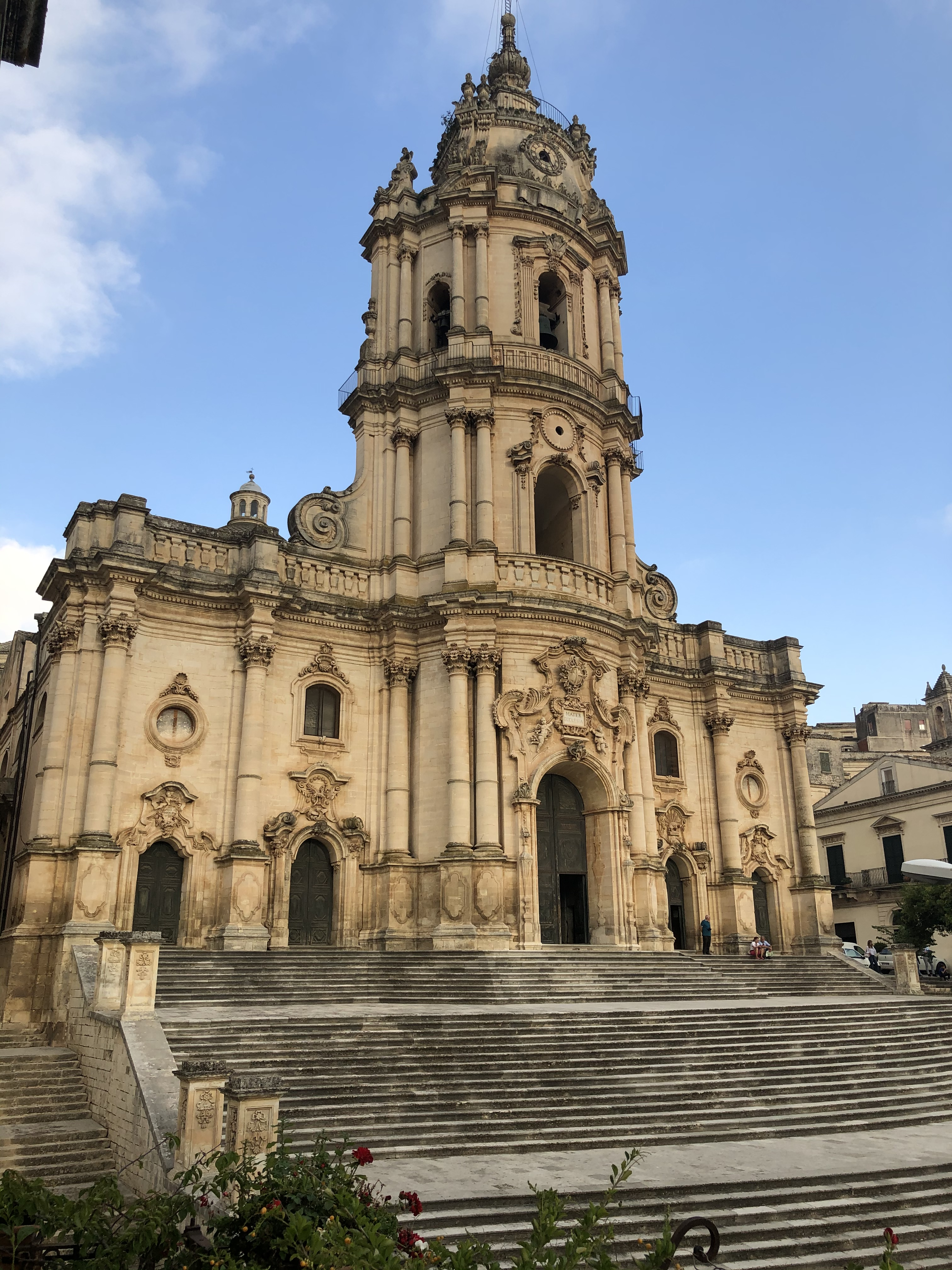
Illustration 10: Cathedral of San Giorgio, Modica

Of Sicily's own form of Baroque, post-1693, it has been said, "The buildings conceived in the wake of this disaster expressed a light-hearted freedom of decoration whose incongruous gaiety was intended, perhaps, to assuage the horror". While this is an accurate description of a style which is almost a celebration of joie de vivre in stone, it is unlikely to be the reason for the choice. As with all architectural styles, the selection of style would have directly linked to current fashion. Versailles had been completed in 1688 in a far sterner Baroque style; Louis XIV's new palace was immediately emulated across Europe by any aristocrat or sovereign in Europe aspiring to wealth, taste, or power.

As the 18th century dawned, Sicilian architects were employed to create the new palazzi and churches. These architects, often local, were able to design in a more sophisticated style than those of the late 17th century: many had been trained in mainland Italy and had returned with a more detailed understanding of the Baroque idiom. Their work inspired less-travelled Sicilian designers. Very importantly, these architects were also assisted by the books of engravings by Domenico de' Rossi, who for the first time wrote down text with his engravings, giving the precise dimensions and measurements of many of the principal Renaissance and Baroque façades in Rome. In this way, the Renaissance finally came late to Sicily by proxy.

At this stage of its development, Sicilian Baroque still lacked the freedom of style that it was later to acquire. Giovanni Battista Vaccarini was the leading Sicilian architect during this period. He arrived on the island in 1730 bringing with him a fusion of the concepts of Bernini and Borromini, and introduced to the island's architecture a unified movement and a play of curves, which would have been unacceptable in Rome itself. However, his works are considered of lesser quality than those which were to come. Notable works which date from this period are the 18th century wings of the Palazzo Biscari at Catania and Vaccarini's Cattedrale di Sant'Agata, also in Catania. On this building Vaccarini quite clearly copied the capitals from Guarino Guarini's Architettura Civile. It is this frequent copying of established designs that causes the architecture from this period, while opulent, also to be disciplined and almost reined in. The style of Vaccarini, appointed City Architect in 1736, was to dominate Catania for the next decades.

A second hindrance to Sicilian architects' fully achieving their potential earlier was that frequently they were only rebuilding a damaged structure, and as a consequence having to match their designs to what had been before, or remained. The Cathedral of San Giorgio at Modica (Illustration 10) is an example. It was badly damaged in an earthquake of 1613, rebuilt in 1643 in a Baroque style while keeping the medieval layout, then damaged again in 1693. Rebuilding again began in 1702, by an unknown architect; Rosario Gagliardi oversaw the façade's completion in 1760,

There were also other influences at work at this time. Between 1718 and 1734 Sicily was ruled personally by Charles VI from Vienna, and as a result close ties with Austrian architecture can be perceived. Several buildings on the island are shameless imitations of the works of Fischer von Erlach, who had begun to rebuild Schönbrunn Palace in 1686 in a simple form of Baroque; this form was later to be reproduced in Sicily in the final years of its Baroque era. The palace also had an external staircase (removed in 1746) similar to those that later evolved in Sicily. One Sicilian architect, Tommaso Napoli, a monk, visited Vienna twice early in the century, returning with a store of engraving and drawings. He was later the architect of two country villas of the early Sicilian Baroque period, remarkable for their concave and convex walls and the complex design of their external staircases. One villa, his Villa Palagonia in Bagheria, begun in 1705, is the most complex and ingenious of any constructed in Sicily's Baroque era: its double staircase of straight flights, frequently changing direction, was to be the prototype of a distinguishing feature of Sicilian Baroque.

Later, a new wave of architects who would master the Baroque sentiments, aware of Rococo interior styles beginning elsewhere to gain an ascendancy over Baroque, would go on to develop the flamboyance and "elastic conceptions of space" that today are synonymous with the term Sicilian Baroque.

== High Sicilian Baroque ==
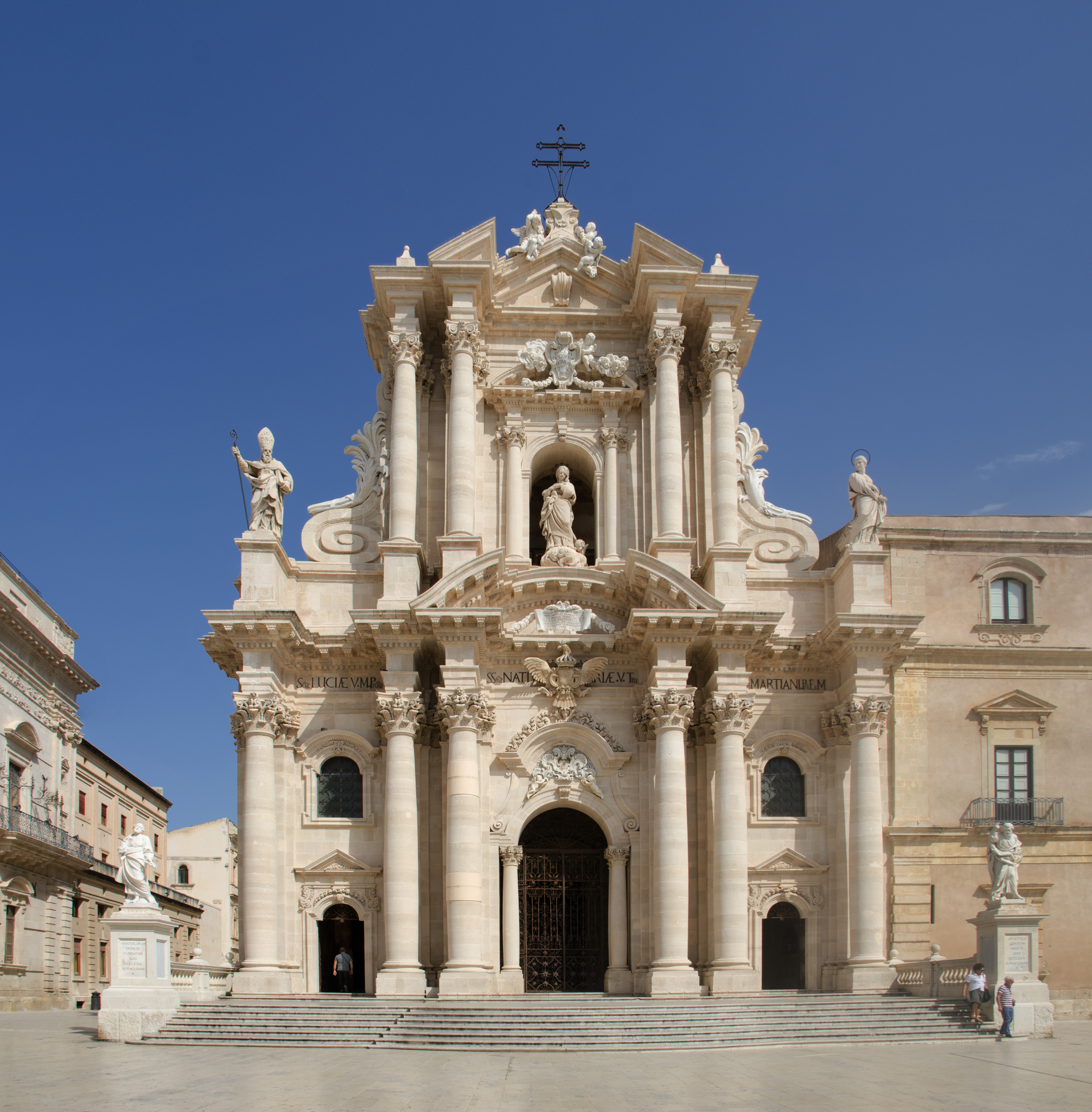
Illustration 11: Cathedral of Syracuse, Andrea Palma's cathedral façade (begun in 1728). Based on the formula of a Roman triumphal arch, the broken masses within a columned façade create a theatrical effect.

Around 1730, the Baroque style gradually began to break away from the defined Roman style of Baroque and gain an even stronger individuality, for two reasons: the rush to rebuild was subsiding and construction was becoming more leisurely and thoughtful; and a new clutch of home-grown Sicilian architects came to the forefront. This new generation had watched the rebuilding in the Baroque, and studied the engravings and architectural books and treatises arriving ever more frequently from the mainland. However, they were not like their predecessors (the former students of the Romans), and consequently were able to formulate strong individual styles of their own. They included Andrea Palma, Rosario Gagliardi and Tommaso Napoli. (Note: The art historian John Varriano notes Napoli's four-flight double staircase in the Villa Palagonia, a building Varriano considers "one of the most striking in all of Italy".) While taking account of the Baroque of Naples and Rome, they now adapted their designs for the local needs and traditions. Their use of resources and exploitation of the sites was often wildly inventive. Napoli and then Vaccarini had promoted the use of the external staircase, which was now taken to a new dimension: hilltop churches would be reached by fantastical flights of steps evoking Vaccarini's mentor Francesco de Sanctis's Spanish Steps in Rome.

Façades of churches often came to resemble wedding cakes rather than places of worship as the architects grew in confidence, competence, and stature. (Note: Sir John Summerson describes Andrea Palma's Syracuse cathedral façade as a "volatile interpretation" of Giacomo Barozzi da Vignola's Church of the Gesù in Rome.) Church interiors, which until this date had been slightly pedestrian, came especially in Palermo to be decorated in a riot of inlaid marbles of a wide variety of colours. Anthony Blunt has described this decoration as "either fascinating or repulsive, but however the individual spectator may react to it, this style is a characteristic manifestation of Sicilian exuberance, and must be classed amongst the most important and original creations of Baroque art on the island". This is the key to Sicilian Baroque: it was ideally matched to the Sicilian personality, and this was the reason it evolved so dramatically on the island. Nowhere in Sicily is the development of the new Baroque style more evident than in Ragusa and Catania.

=== Ragusa ===
Ragusa was very badly damaged in 1693. The town is in two halves, divided by a deep ravine known as the "Valle dei Ponti": the older town of Ragusa Ibla, and the higher Ragusa Superiore.

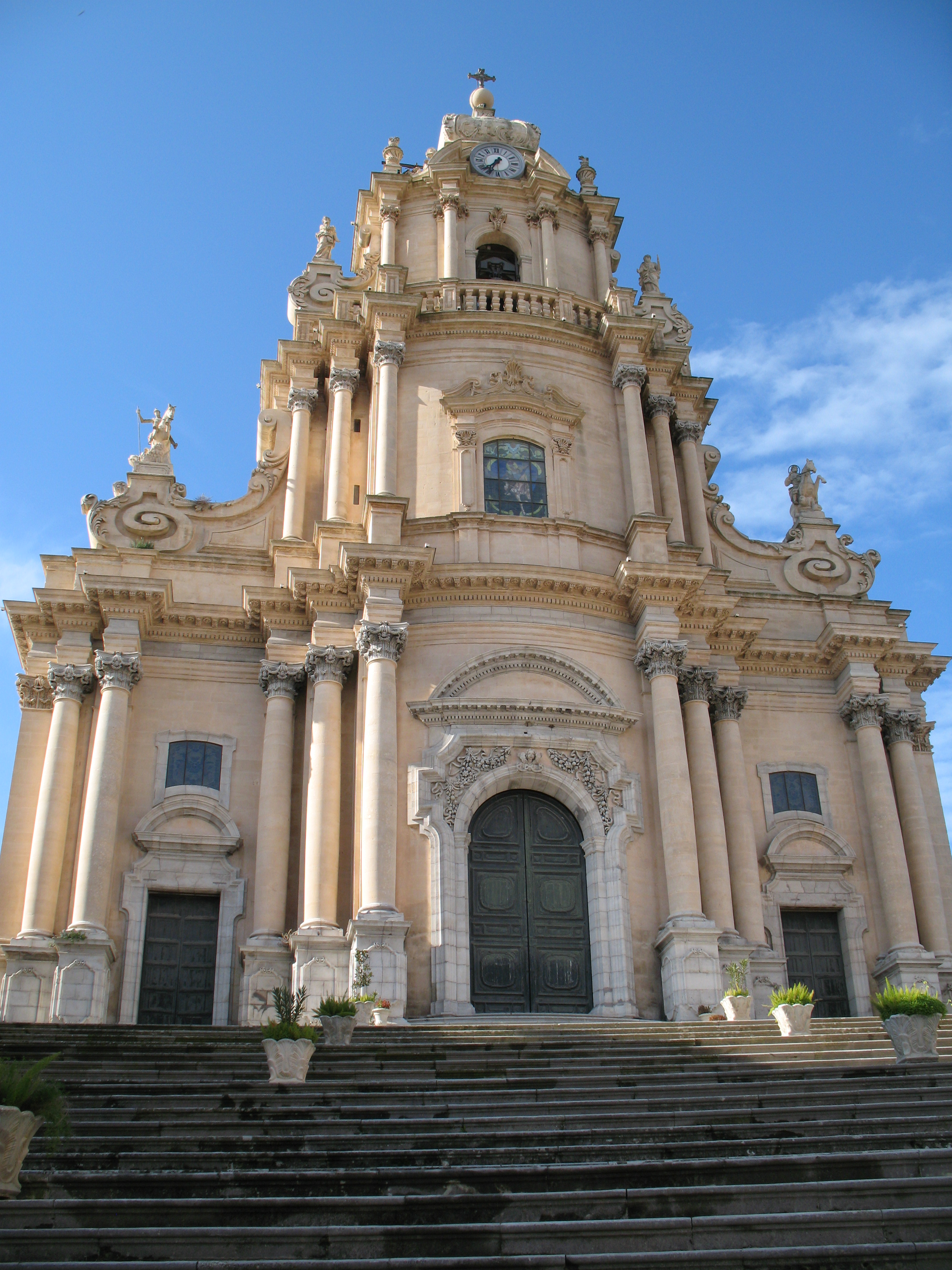
Illustration 12: Rosario Gagliardi's Duomo of San Giorgio in Ragusa

Ragusa Ibla, the lower city, boasts an impressive array of Baroque architecture, which includes the Duomo of San Giorgio by Rosario Gagliardi, designed in 1738 (Illustration 12). In the design of this church, Gagliardi exploited the difficult terrain of the hillside site. The church towers impressively over a massive marble staircase of some 250 steps, a Baroque feature, especially exploited in Sicily due to the island's topography. The tower seems to explode from the façade, accentuated by the columns and pilasters canted against the curved walls. Above the doorways and window apertures, pediments scroll and curve with a sense of freedom and movement which would have been unthinkable to those earlier architects inspired by Bernini and Borromini. The neoclassical dome was not added until 1820.

In an alley connecting Ragusa Ibla with Ragusa Superiore is the church of Santa Maria delle Scale. This church is interesting, though badly damaged in the earthquake. Only half the church was rebuilt in Baroque style, while the surviving half was kept in the original Norman (with Gothic features), thus demonstrating the evolution of Sicilian Baroque.

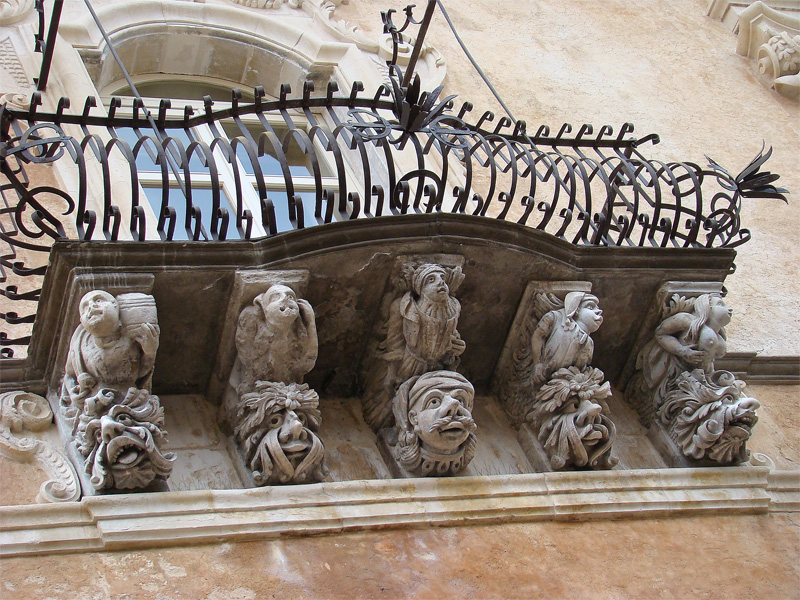
A balcony of the Palazzo Zacco

The Palazzo Zacco is one of the more notable Baroque buildings of the city, its Corinthian columns supporting balconies of amazing wrought iron work, while supports of grotesques mock, shock or amuse the passerby. The palazzo was built in the second half of the 18th century by the Baron Melfi di San Antonio. It was later acquired by the Zacco family, after which it is named. The building has two street façades, each with six wide balconies bearing the coat of arms of the Melfi family, a frame of acanthus leaves from which a putto leans. The balconies, a feature of the palazzo, are notable for the differing corbels which support them, ranging from putti to musicians and grotesques. The focal points of the principal façade are the three central balconies, divided by columns with Corinthian capitals. Here the balconies are supported by images of musicians with grotesque faces.

The Ragusa Cathedral in Ragusa Superiore was built between 1718 and 1778. Its principal façade is pure Baroque, containing fine carvings and sculptures. The cathedral has a high Sicilian belfry in the same style. The ornate Baroque interior is separated into three colonnaded aisles. Ragusa Superiore was replanned following 1693 around the cathedral and displays an unusual phenomenon of Sicilian Baroque: the palazzi here are peculiar to this town, of only two storeys and long, with the central bay only emphasised by a balcony and an arch to the inner garden. This very Austrian style, probably designed to minimise damage in future earthquakes, is very different from the palazzi in Ragusa Ibla, which are in true Sicilian style. Unusually, Baroque lingered on here until the early 19th century. The last palazzo built here was in the Baroque form but with columns of Roman Doric and neoclassical balconies.

=== Catania ===
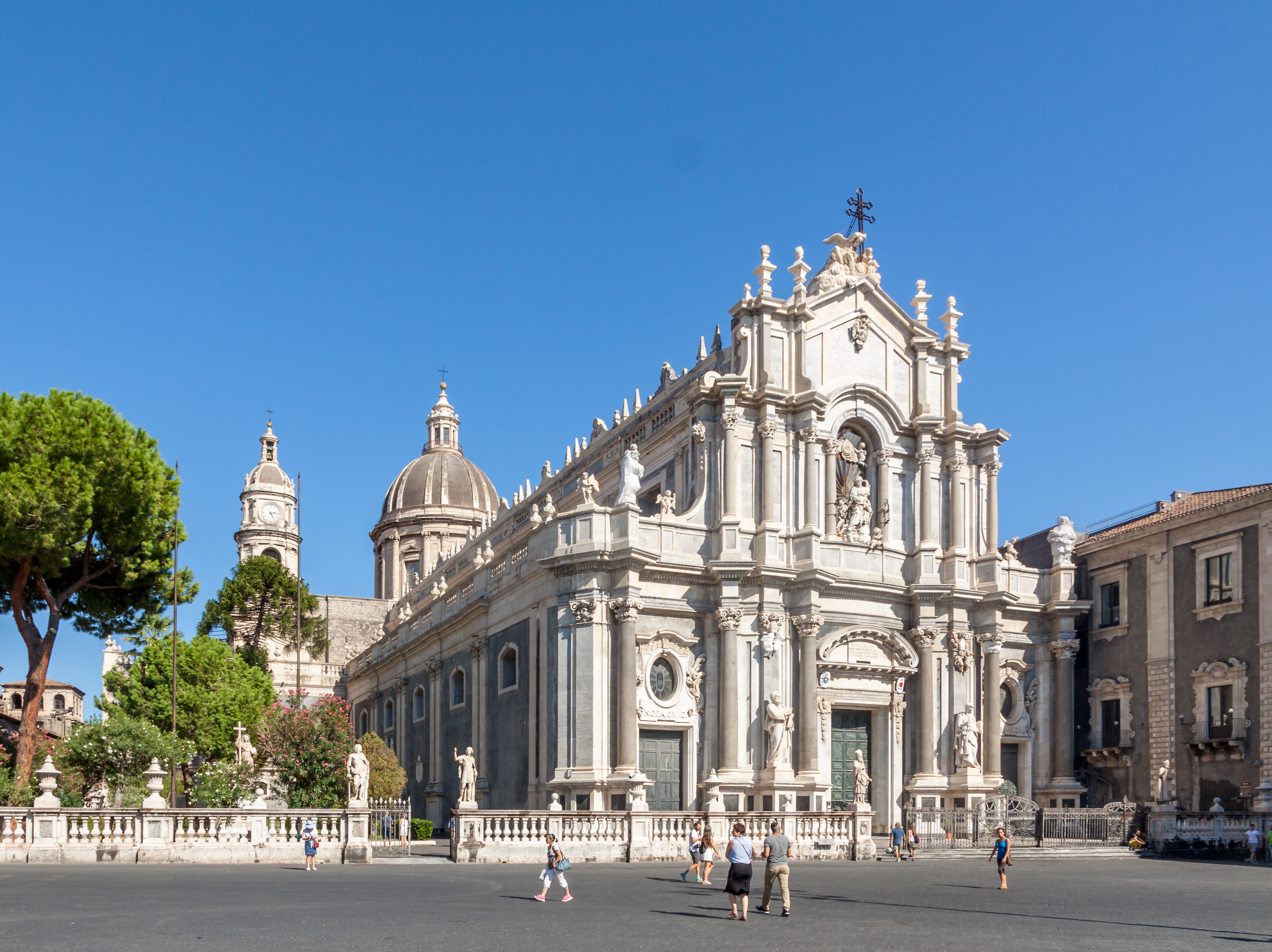
Illustration 13: Catania Cathedral. Giovanni Battista Vaccarini's principal façade of 1736 shows Spanish architectural influences.

Sicily's second city, Catania, was the most damaged of all the larger cities in 1693, with only the medieval Castello Ursino and three tribunes of the cathedral remaining; thus it was replanned and rebuilt. The new design separated the city into quarters, divided by two roads meeting at an intersection known as the Piazza del Duomo (Cathedral Square). Rebuilding was supervised by the Bishop of Catania, and the city's only surviving architect, Alonzo di Benedetto. Di Benedetto headed a team of junior architects called in from Messina, which quickly began to rebuild, concentrating first on the Piazza del Duomo. Three palazzi are situated here, the Bishop's Palace, the Seminario and one other. The architects worked in complete harmony and it is impossible to distinguish di Benedetto's work from that of his junior colleagues. The work is competent but not remarkable, with decorated rustication in the 17th-century Sicilian style, but often the decoration on the upper floors is superficial. This is typical of the Baroque of this period immediately after the earthquake.

In 1730, Vaccarini arrived in Catania as the appointed city architect and immediately impressed on the architecture the Roman Baroque style. The pilasters lose their rustication and support Roman type cornices and entablatures, or curved pediments, and free-standing columns support balconies. Vaccarini also exploited the local black lava stone as a decorative feature rather than a general building material, using it intermittently with other materials, and spectacularly for an obelisk supported on the back of the Catanian heraldic elephant, for a fountain in the style of Bernini in front of the new Town hall. Vaccarini's principal façade to Catania's cathedral, dedicated to Santa Agata, shows strong Spanish influences even at this late stage of Sicilian Baroque. Also in the city is Stefano Ittar's Basilica della Collegiata, built around 1768, and an example of Sicilian Baroque at its most stylistically simple.

== Church interiors ==
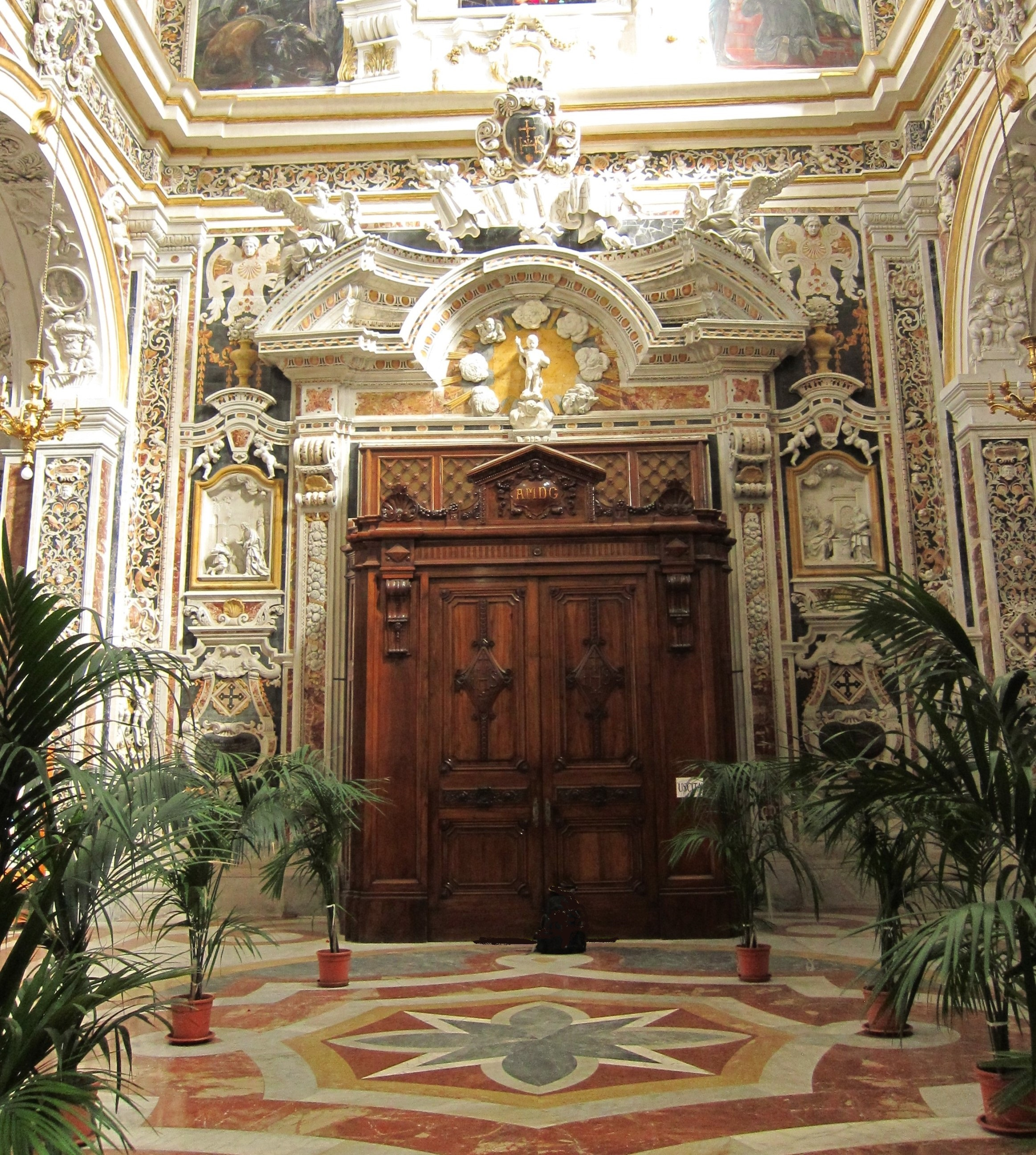
Illustration 14: Chiesa del Gesù, Palermo (1564–1633), with abundant use of polychrome marble on the floor and walls

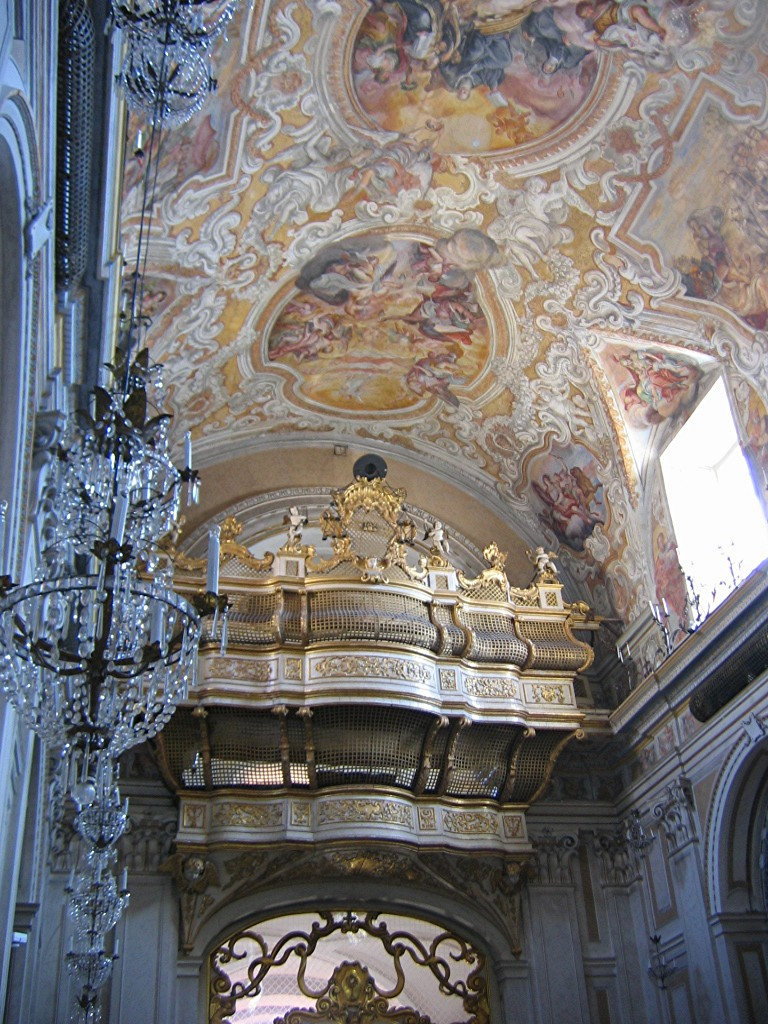
Illustration 15: The nun's choir in the Church of San Benedetto, Catania

Sicilian church exteriors had been decorated in elaborate styles from the first quarter of the 17th century, with ample use of sculpture, stucco, frescoes, and marble (Illustration 14). As the post-earthquake churches were becoming completed in the late 1720s, interiors also began to reflect this external decoration, becoming lighter and less intense (compare illustration 14 to the later interior of illustration 15), with profuse sculpted ornamentation of pillars, cornices, and pediments, often in the form of putti, flora, and fauna. Inlaid coloured marbles on floors and walls in complex patterns are one of the most defining features of the style. These patterns with their roundels of porphyry are often derived from designs found in the Norman cathedrals of Europe, again demonstrating the Norman origins of Sicilian architecture. The high altar is usually the pièce de resistance: in many instances a single block of coloured marble, decorated with gilt scrolls and festoons, and frequently inset with other stones such as lapis lazuli and agate. Steps leading to the altar dais are characteristically curving between concave and convex and in many cases decorated with inlaid coloured marbles. An example of this is in the church of St Zita in Palermo.

The building of Sicily's churches would typically be funded not just by individual religious orders but also by an aristocratic family. Contrary to popular belief, the majority of Sicily's nobility did not choose to have their mortal remains displayed for eternity in the Catacombe dei Cappuccini, but were buried quite conventionally in vaults beneath their family churches. It has been said, though, that "the funeral of a Sicilian aristocrat was one of the great moments of his life, and the luxury he had enjoyed in this life was to lead him into the next". Funerals became tremendous shows of wealth; a result of this ostentation was that the stone memorial slabs covering the burial vaults today provide an accurate barometer of the development of Baroque and marble inlay techniques at any specific time. For instance, those from the first half of the 17th century are of simple white marble decorated with an incised armorial bearing, name, date, etc. From c. 1650, small quantities of coloured marble inlay appear, forming patterns, and this can be seen developing until, by the end of the century, the coats of arms and calligraphy are entirely of inset coloured marble, with decorative patterned borders. Long after Baroque began to fall from fashion in the 1780s, Baroque decor was still deemed more suitable for Catholic ritual than the new, pagan-based neoclassicism.

The Church of San Benedetto in Catania (Illustration 15) is a fine example of a Sicilian Baroque interior, decorated between 1726 and 1762, the period when Sicilian Baroque was at the height of its fashion and individuality. The ceilings were frescoed by the artist Giovanni Tuccari. The most spectacular part of the church's decoration is the nuns' choir (Illustration 15), created c. 1750, which was designed in such a way that the nuns' voices could be heard during services, but the nuns themselves were still quite separate from and unseen by the less spiritual world outside.

== Palazzi interiors ==
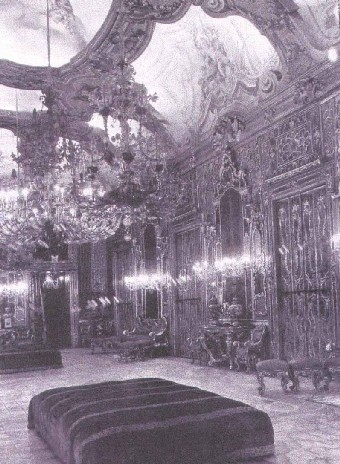
Illustration 16: The ballroom at the Palazzo Gangi, Palermo

Frequently the interiors of the palazzi are less elaborate than those of Sicily's Baroque churches. Many were finished with little ornate interior decoration because they took so long to build: by the time they were completed, Baroque had passed from fashion; in these cases, the principal rooms were frequently decorated in a neoclassical style influenced by the late 18th century Sicilian Anglomania and particularly an admiration of Robert Adam and Wedgwood pottery. However, in true Sicilian style, even this more chaste style would often be embellished with Baroque trompe-l'œil figures and colourful Sicilian tiled floors, such as can be found at the Villa Spedalotto at Bagheria.

Often a fusion of the two styles is found, as in the ballroom wing of the Palazzo Ajutamicristo in Palermo, built by Andrea Giganti in 1763, where the ballroom ceiling was frescoed by Giuseppe Crestadoro with allegorical scenes framed by Baroque gilded motifs in plaster. This ceiling was already old-fashioned when it was finished, and the rest of the room was decorated in a far simpler mode. When Baroque interior decoration did occur, as elsewhere in Italy, the finest and most decorated rooms were those on the piano nobile, reserved for guests and entertaining. Occasionally, however, the late date of completion means that the decoration can be described as Rococo – the flamboyant swan song of the Baroque era.

A further reason for the absence of Baroque decoration, and the most common, is that most rooms were never intended for public view and, therefore, expensive decoration. Many of the palazzi were vast; the Palazzo Biscari has 700 rooms. This was necessary because the household of a Sicilian aristocrat, beginning with himself, his wife and many children, would typically also contain a collection of poorer relatives and other extended family members, all of whom had minor apartments in the house. Moreover, there were paid employees, often including a private chaplain or confessor, a majordomo, governesses, secretary, archivist, accountant, librarian, and innumerable lower servants, such as a porter to ring a bell a prescribed number of times according to the rank of an approaching guest. Often the servants' extended families, especially if elderly, also lived in the palazzo. Thus, many rooms were needed to house the household. These everyday living quarters, even the bedrooms of "Maestro and Maestra di Casa", were often simply decorated and furnished. Gérard Gefen states in his book Sicily, Land of the Leopard Princes that bedrooms were kept austere as they were rooms for fighting off temptation and sin as much as for sleeping.

Further rooms were required by the Sicilian tradition that it was a sign of poor breeding to permit even mere acquaintances to stay in local inns. Any visiting foreigner, especially from a distant European metropolis, was regarded as a special trophy and added social prestige. Hence the Sicilian aristocrat's home was seldom empty or quiet.

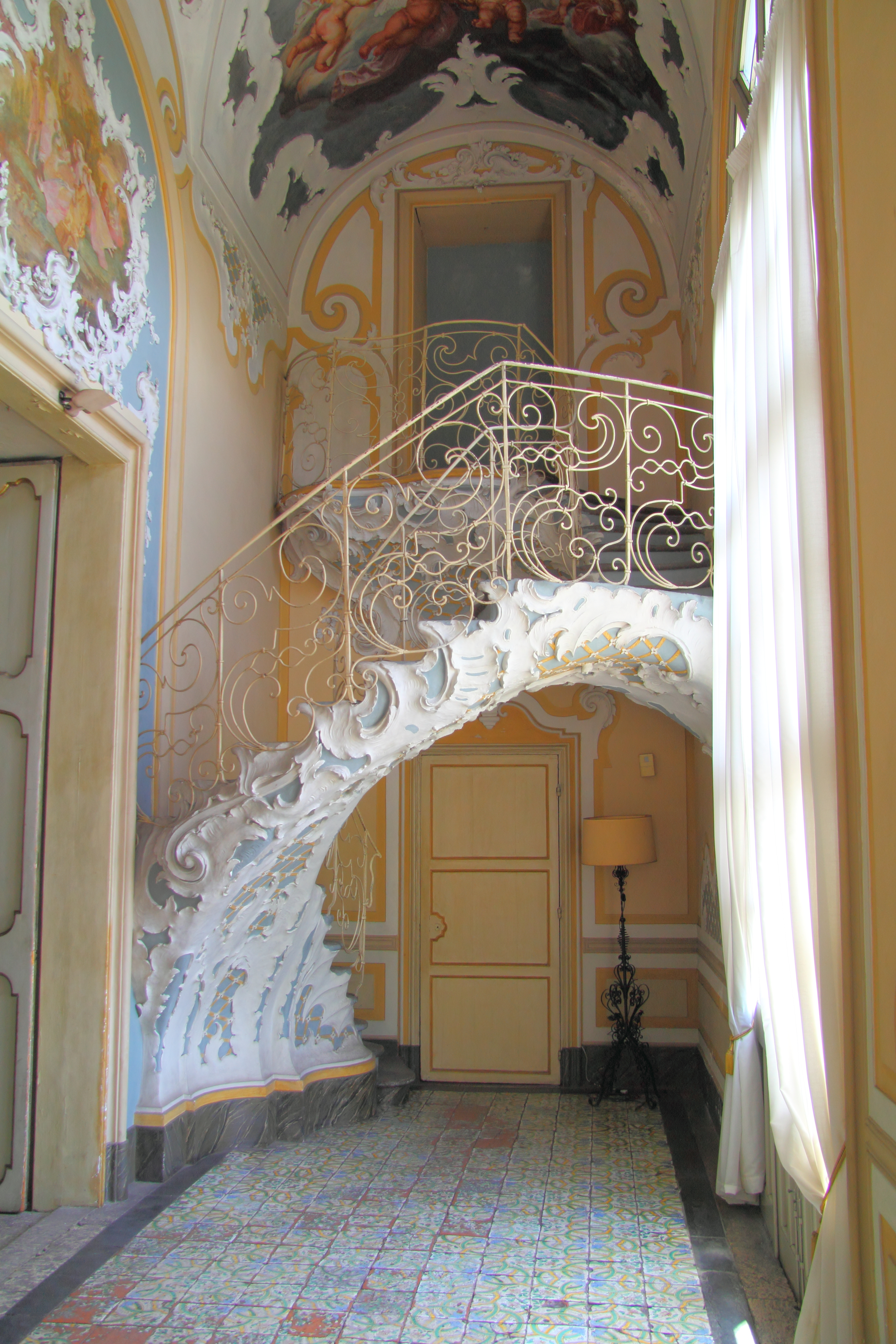
Illustration 17: The flamboyant staircase at the Palazzo Biscari

The rooms of the piano nobile were entered formally from an external Baroque double staircase: they consisted of a suite of large and small salons, with one very large salon being the principal room of the house, often used as a ballroom. Sometimes the guest bedrooms were sited here too, but by the end of the 18th century they were more often on a secondary floor above. If decorated during the Baroque era, the rooms would be profusely ornamented. Walls were frequently mirrored, the mirrors inset into gilded frames in the walls, often alternating with paintings similarly framed, while moulded nymphs and shepherdesses decorated the spaces between. Ceilings were high and frescoed, and from the ceiling hung huge coloured chandeliers of Murano glass, while further light came from gilded sconces flanking the mirrors adorning the walls. One of the most notable rooms in this style is the Gallery of Mirrors in Palermo's Palazzo Valguarnera-Gangi (Illustration 16), a building described as "Sicily's most famous palazzo". This room with its frescoed ceiling by Gaspare Fumagalli is, however, one of the few Baroque rooms in this Baroque palazzo, which was (from 1750) extended and transformed by its owner Marianna Valguarnera, mostly in the later neoclassical style. (Note: The room was used for the ballroom scene of Visconti's The Leopard) Baroque interior decoration eventually reached such an exuberance that it became known as Rococo: this is exemplified by the internal staircase (Illustration 17) at the Palazzo Biscari, completed in 1763.

Furniture during the Baroque era was in keeping with the style: ornate, gilded and frequently with marble used for tabletops. The furniture was transient within the house, frequently moved between rooms as required, while leaving other rooms unfurnished. Sometimes furniture was specifically commissioned for a certain room, for example to match a silk wall panel within a gilt frame. For the greater part of the 18th century furniture would always be left arranged against a wall, never in the later conversational style in the centre of a room, which in the Baroque era was always left empty: an arrangement which displayed the marble, or more often ceramic, patterned floor tiles.

Common to both church and palazzi interior design was the stucco work. Stucco is an important component of the Baroque design and philosophy, as it seamlessly combines architecture, sculpture, and painting in three-dimensional form. Its combination with trompe l'œil ceilings and walls in Baroque illusionistic painting confuses reality and art. While in churches the stucco could represent angels and putti linked by swags of flowers, in a private house it might represent musical instruments or the owner's favourite foods.

Changing use over the past 250 years has simplified palazzo decor further, as the ground floors are now usually shops, banks, or restaurants, and the upper floors divided into apartments, their interiors lost or decayed.

== Late Sicilian Baroque ==
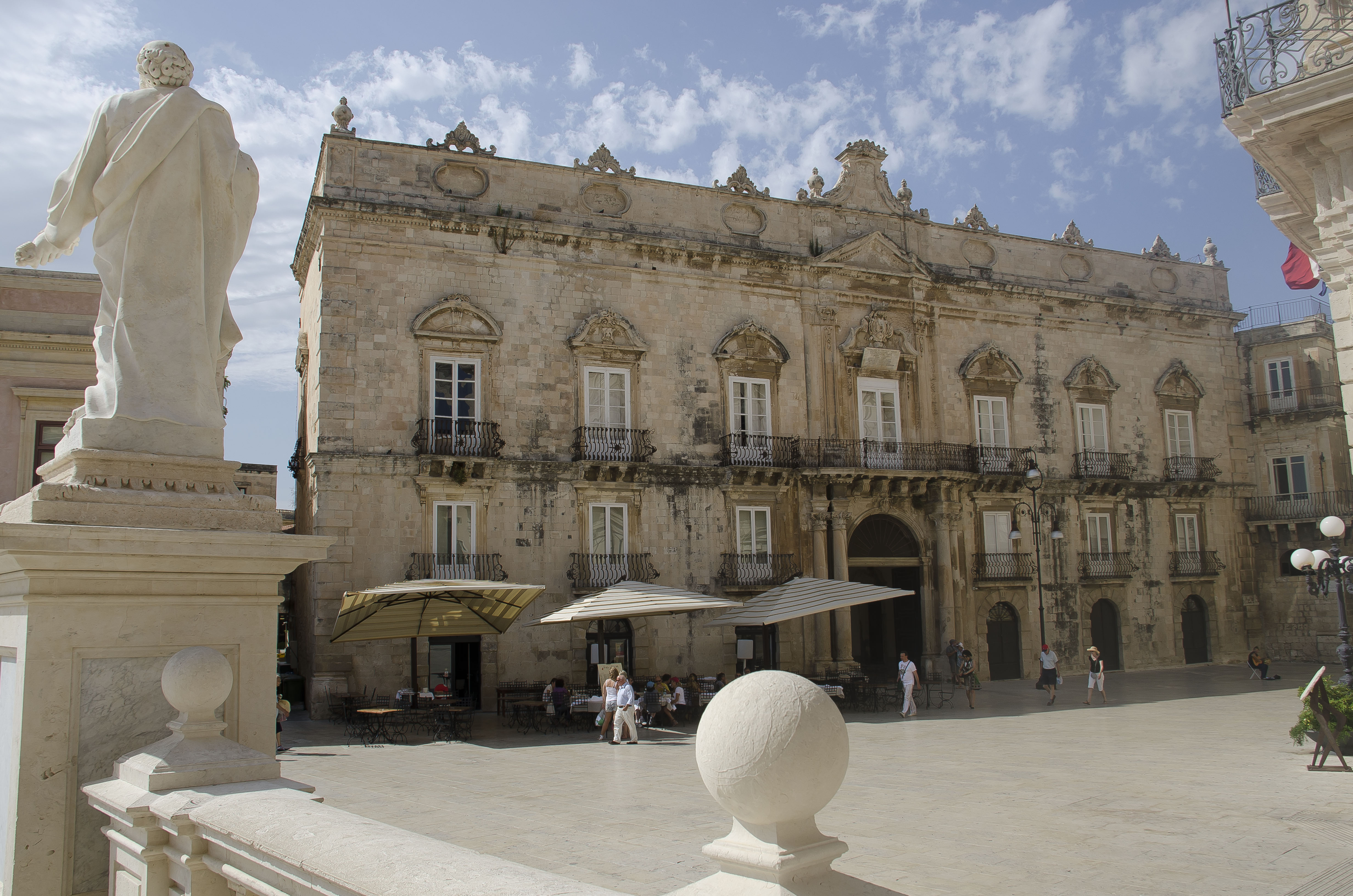
Illustration 18: Palazzo Beneventano del Bosco (1779), Syracuse, designed by Luciano Alì in restrained late Sicilian Baroque. The wrought iron balconies and sweeping curves, however, keep the approaching neoclassicism at bay.

Baroque eventually went out of fashion. In some parts of Europe, it metamorphosed into the Rococo, but not in Sicily where the Rococo is only found internally. No longer ruled by Austria, Sicily, from 1735 officially the Kingdom of Sicily, was ruled by the King of Naples, Ferdinand IV. Hence Palermo was in constant association with the principal capital Naples, where there was architecturally a growing reversion to the more classical styles of architecture. Coupled with this, many of the more cultured Sicilian nobility developed a fashionable obsession with all things French, from philosophy to arts, fashion, and architecture. Many of them visited Paris in pursuit of these interests and returned with the latest architectural engravings and theoretical treatises.

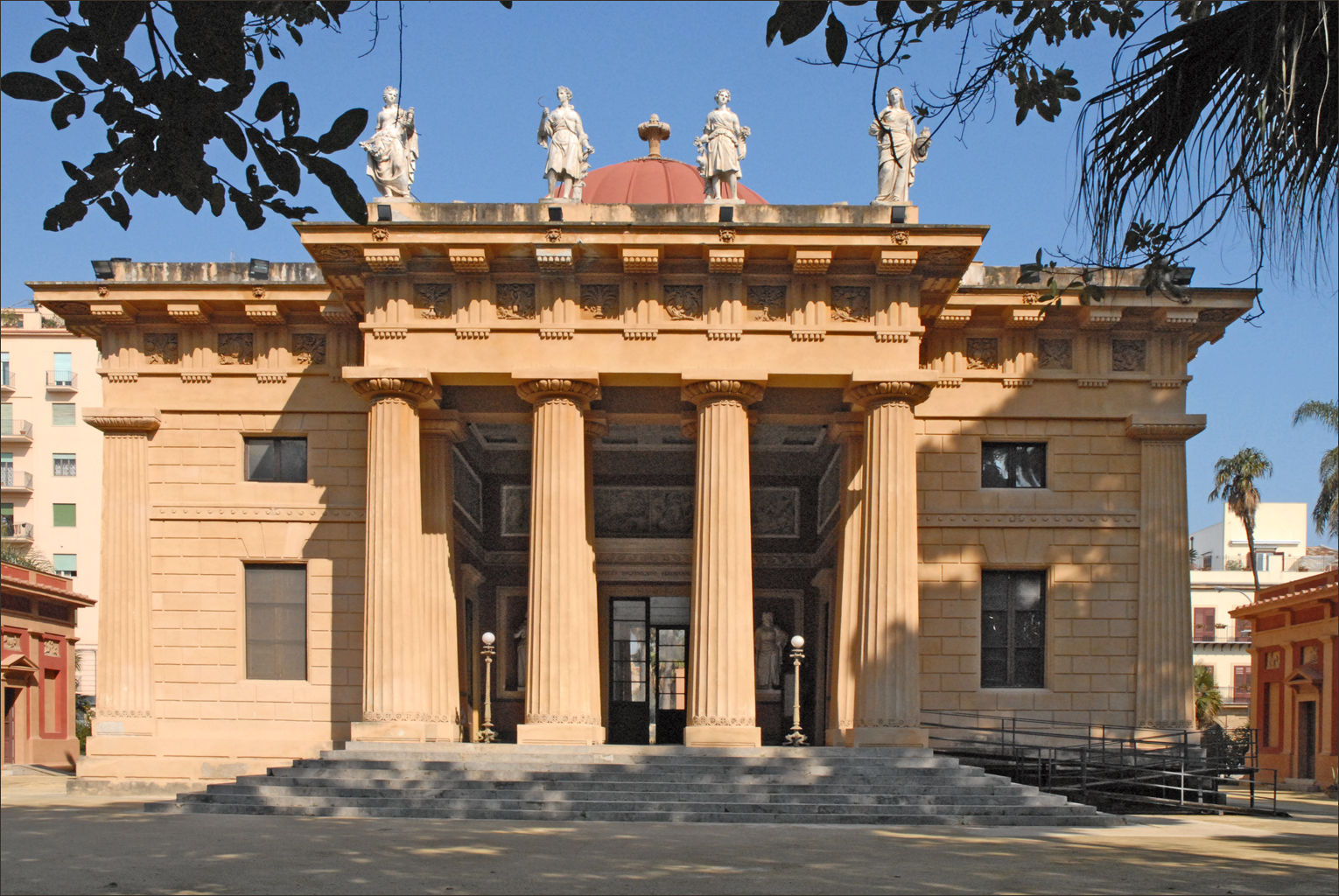
The "Entrance Temple" to the Orto botanico di Palermo

The French architect Léon Dufourny was in Sicily between 1787 and 1794 to study and analyse the ancient Greek temples on the island. Thus Sicilians rediscovered their ancient past, which with its classical idioms was now the height of fashion. The change in tastes did not come about overnight. Baroque remained popular on the island, but now Sicilian balconies, extravagant as ever, would be placed next to severe classical columns. Dufourny began designing in Palermo, and his "Entrance Temple" (1789) to the Palermo Botanical Garden was the first building in Sicily in a style based on the Greek Doric order. It is pure neoclassical architecture, as established in England since 1760, and it was a sign of things to come. (Note: Commenting on Dufourny's "blatantly Neo-Classic" pavilion, John Varriano noted, "it would issue in the new age. But nowhere in Italy did the Baroque die so graceful and dignified a death".)

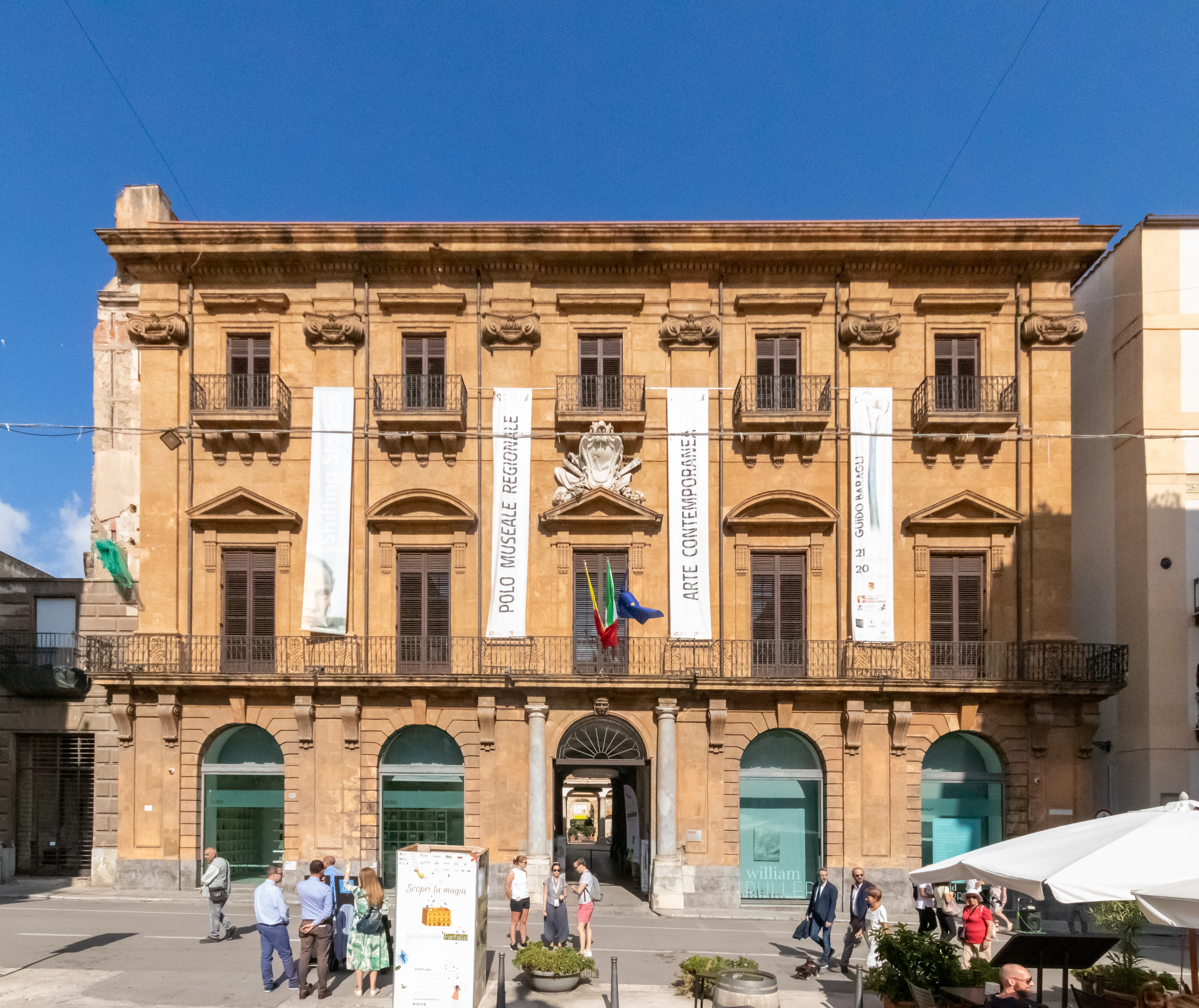
Illustration 21: Palazzo Belmonte Riso (1784), restrained late Sicilian Baroque with more dominant neoclassical features. The upper windows have neoclassical pediments, while the piano nobile has Baroque pediments and a balcony with decorated corbels. The pilasters have decorated Baroque capitals, but are otherwise simple and unadorned.

It was Dufourny's great friend and fellow architect Giuseppe Marvuglia who was to preside over the gradual decline of Sicilian Baroque. In 1784 he designed the Palazzo Belmonte Riso (Illustration 21), a good example of the period of architectural transition, combining both Baroque and neoclassical motifs, built around an arcaded courtyard providing Baroque masses of light and shade, or chiaroscuro. (Note: The Palazzo, badly damaged by bombing in World War II, was restored in 2008 and is now a museum of contemporary art.) The main façade, punctuated by giant pilasters, also had Baroque features, but the skyline was unbroken. The pilasters were undecorated, simple, and Ionic, and supported an undecorated entablature. Above the windows were classical unbroken pediments. Sicilian Baroque was waning.

By the closing years of the 18th century, impoverished Sicily was ruled from Naples by the weak Ferdinand IV and his dominant wife. In 1798 and again in 1806, the King was forced by the invading French to flee Naples to Sicily. The French were only kept at bay from Sicily by an expeditionary force of 17,000 British troops, and Sicily was now ruled by Britain in effect if not in name. King Ferdinand then in 1811 imposed Sicily's first tax, at a single stroke alienating his aristocracy.

However, the British influence in Sicily was to provide Sicilian Baroque with one last flourish. Marvuglia, recognising the new fashion for all things British, developed the style he had first cautiously used at Palazzo Belmonte Riso in 1784, combining some of the plainer, more solid elements of Baroque with Palladian motifs rather than Palladian designs. The late Sicilian Baroque was similar in style to the Baroque popular in England at the beginning of the 18th century, popularised by Sir John Vanbrugh with such edifices as Blenheim Palace. An example is Marvuglia's Church of San Francesco di Sales, which is almost English in its interpretation of Baroque. However, this was only a temporary success and the neoclassical style was soon dominant. Few aristocrats could now afford to build, and the new style was mainly used in public and civil buildings such as those at the Palermo Botanical Garden. Sicilian architects – even Andrea Giganti, once a competent architect in Baroque – now began to design in the neoclassical style, but in the version of the neoclassical adopted by fashionable France. An example is his Villa Galletti at Bagheria, inspired by the work of Ange-Jacques Gabriel. A contemporary traveller, the Comte de Borch, noted the French influence, describing the villa as "décorée à la française, avec trumeaux, boiseries légères, etc."

== Decline ==
The decline of Sicilian Baroque was inevitable. Not only were tastes changing generally, but the aristocratic money was running out. During the 17th century, the aristocracy had lived principally on their landed estates, tending and improving them, and as a result their income also increased. During the 18th century, the nobility gradually migrated towards the cities, in particular Palermo, to enjoy the social delights of the Viceroy's court and Catania. Their town palazzi grew in size and splendour, to the detriment of the abandoned estates, which were still expected to provide the revenue. The land agents left to run the estates over time became less efficient, or corrupt, often both. Consequently, aristocratic incomes fell. (Note: The historian Denis Mack Smith, in his A History of Sicily: Medieval Sicily, 800–1713, noted: "The fact that the Sicilian aristocracy consumed a great deal and produced nothing was fundamental in explaining the problems of the island".) The aristocracy borrowed money using the estates as surety, until the value of the neglected estates fell below the money borrowed against them. Moreover, Sicily was by now as unstable politically as its nobility were financially.

Ferdinand's unpopular tax of 1811 was rescinded by the British in 1812, who then imposed a British style constitution on the island. One legal innovation of this time of particular consequence for the aristocracy was that creditors, who had previously only been able to enforce repayments of the interest on a loan or mortgage, could now seize property. Property began to change hands in smaller parcels at auctions, and consequently a land-owning bourgeoisie immediately began to flourish. Revolts against the Bourbons in 1821 and 1848 divided the nobility, and liberalism was in the air. These factors, coupled with the social and political upheaval of the following Risorgimento in the 19th century, meant the Sicilian aristocracy was a doomed class, having to live off their capital. Immediately following the Risorgimento, Sicily's annexation to the new Italian state was economically disastrous for the island, in no small part due to the relaxation of foreign exchange, which was advantageous only to the more industrial north of the new kingdom, but forced the more agricultural south to compete in the North American commodity markets. Furthermore, because of their neglect and dereliction of noblesse oblige, an essential element of the feudal system, the countryside was often ruled by bandits outside the enclosed villages, and the once grand country villas were decaying. The dominance of the Sicilian upper class was over.

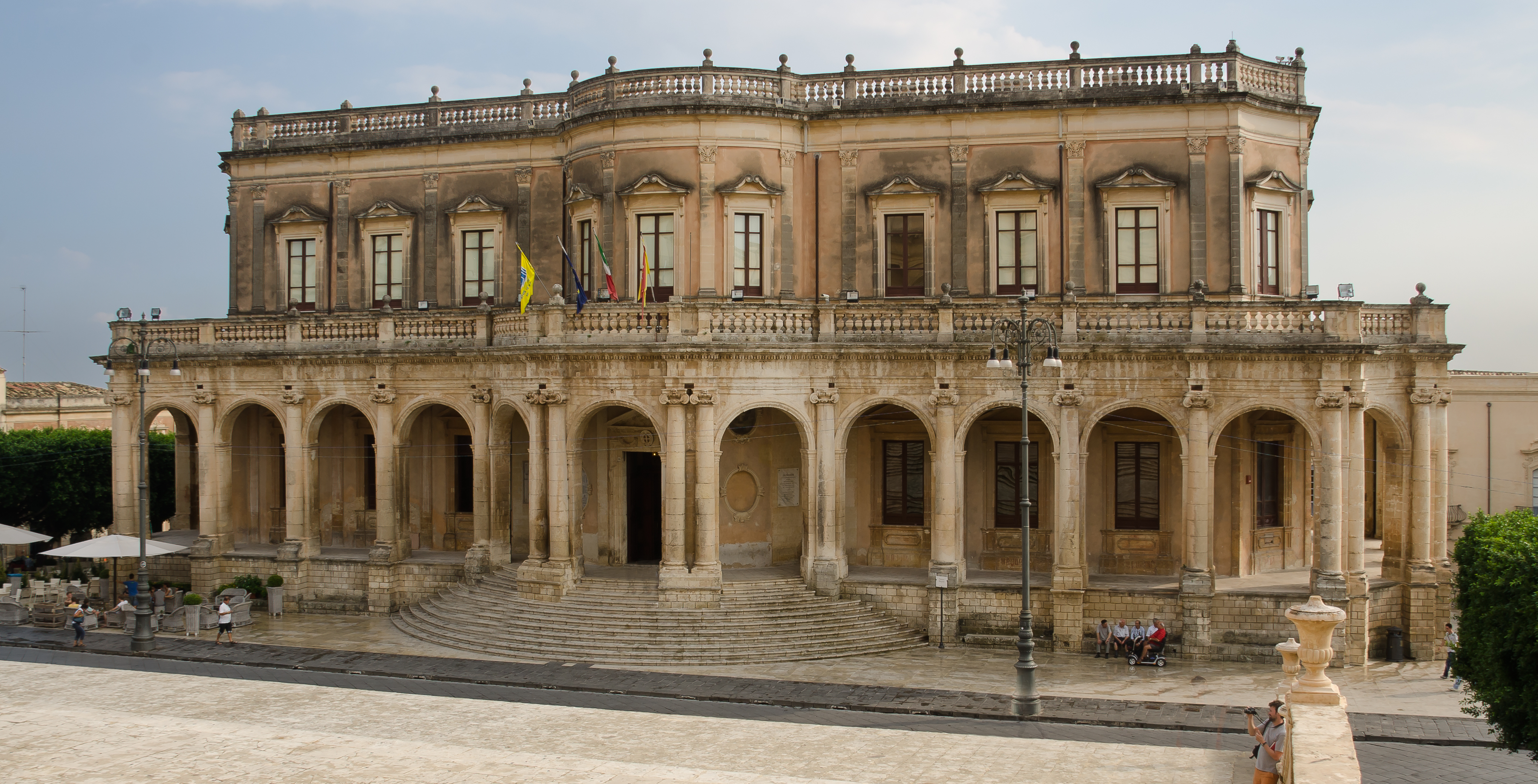
Illustration 19: Palazzo Ducezio at Noto

As with the early days of Sicilian Baroque, the first buildings of the new neoclassical era were often copies or hybrids of the two styles. The Palazzo Ducezio (Illustration 19) was begun in 1746, and the ground floor with arcades creating play of light and shadow is pure Baroque. However, when a few years later the upper floor was added, despite the use of Baroque broken pediments above the windows, the neoclassical French influence is very pronounced, highlighted by the central curved bay. The Sicilian Baroque was gradually and slowly being superseded by French neoclassicism.

== Legacy ==
Sicilian Baroque is today recognised as an architectural style, largely due to the work of Sacheverall Sitwell, whose Southern Baroque Art of 1924 was the first book to appreciate the style, followed by the more academic work of Anthony Blunt in 1968.

Most of the Baroque palazzi continued in private ownership throughout the 19th century, as the old aristocracy either married middle-class money or fell further into debt. There were a few exceptions and some of these still retain their ancestral palazzi today. Thanks to the continuing religious devotion of the Sicilian people, many of the Sicilian Baroque churches are today still in the use for which they were designed. Large parts of Messina, rebuilt after the 1783 earthquake, were destroyed by another in 1908.

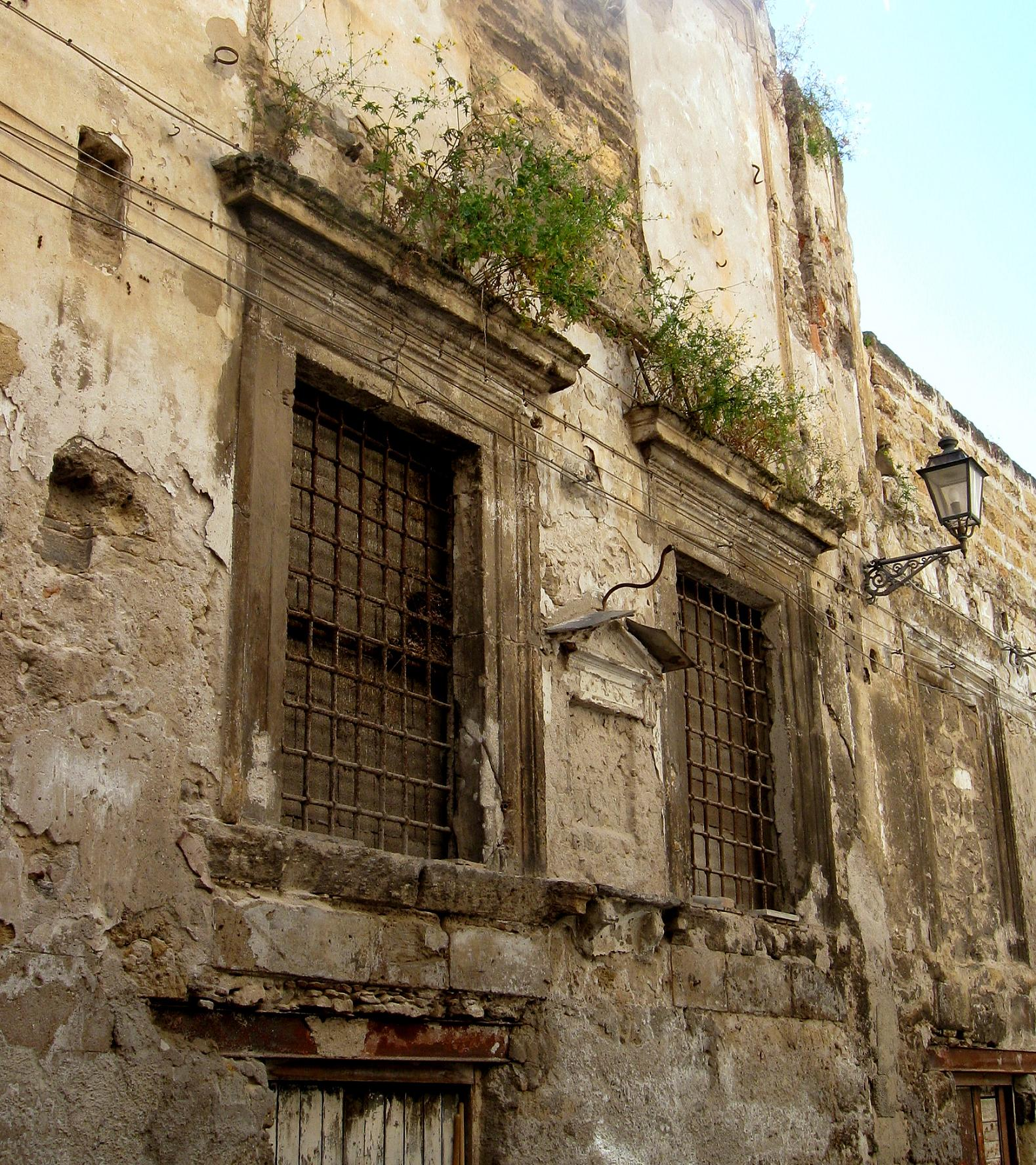
Illustration 20: Palazzo Lampedusa in Palermo

However, much of the blame for the decay and ruinous state of preservation of so many palazzi must fall not just on owners unwilling to accept change, but on the political agendas of successive socialist governments. Some of the finest Baroque villas and palazzi are still in ruins following the United States bombing raids of 1943. In many cases, no attempt has been made to restore or even secure them. Those that survived the raids in good repair, and also some of those that didn't, including Palazzo Lampedusa, the Palermo home of the Princes of Lampedusa, are often sub-divided into offices or apartments, their Baroque interiors dismantled, divided, and sold.

The remaining members of the Sicilian aristocracy who still inhabit their ancestral palazzi are unable to make opening their houses to tourism a major source of income, unlike some Northern, especially English, counterparts. The local equivalent of the National Trust is very small, and there is much less local interest among the general population. The princes, marquesses, and counts of Sicily still living in their houses dwell in splendid isolation, surrounded often by beauty and decay. It is only today that both owners and the state are awakening to the possibility that if action is not taken soon it will be too late to save this particular part of the Sicilian heritage.

As Sicily now becomes a more politically stable, secure and less corrupt environment, the Baroque palazzi are slowly beginning to open their doors to an eager paying public, American and Northern European as much as Italian. In 1963, when the movie The Leopard was released, the Gangi Palace ballroom was almost unique in having been a film set, but today long unused salons and ballrooms are hosting corporate and public events. Some palazzi are offering a bed and breakfast service to paying guests, once again providing impressive hospitality to visitors to Sicily, the purpose for which they were originally intended.

In 2002, UNESCO selectively included Baroque monuments of Val di Noto into its World Heritage List as "providing outstanding testimony to the exuberant genius of late Baroque art and architecture" and "representing the culmination and final flowering of Baroque art in Europe.

== Notable architects ==
- Paolo Amato
- Giacomo Amato
- Mariano Smiriglio
- Angelo Italia
- Rosario Gagliardi
- Andrea Giganti
- Gaspare Guercio
- Guarino Guarini
- Stefano Ittar
- Paolo Labisi
- Giulio Lasso
- Giuseppe Venanzio Marvuglia
- Tommaso Napoli
- Andrea Palma
- Vincenzo Sinatra
- Giovanni Battista Vaccarini
- Francesco Battaglia

== See also ==
- List of architectural styles
- Maltese Baroque architecture
