= Duomo of San Giorgio, Ragusa =

Baroque church on Sicily, Italy

Coordinates: 36.9267°N 14.7419°E

Duomo of San Giorgio
- Insigne collegiata di San Giorgio
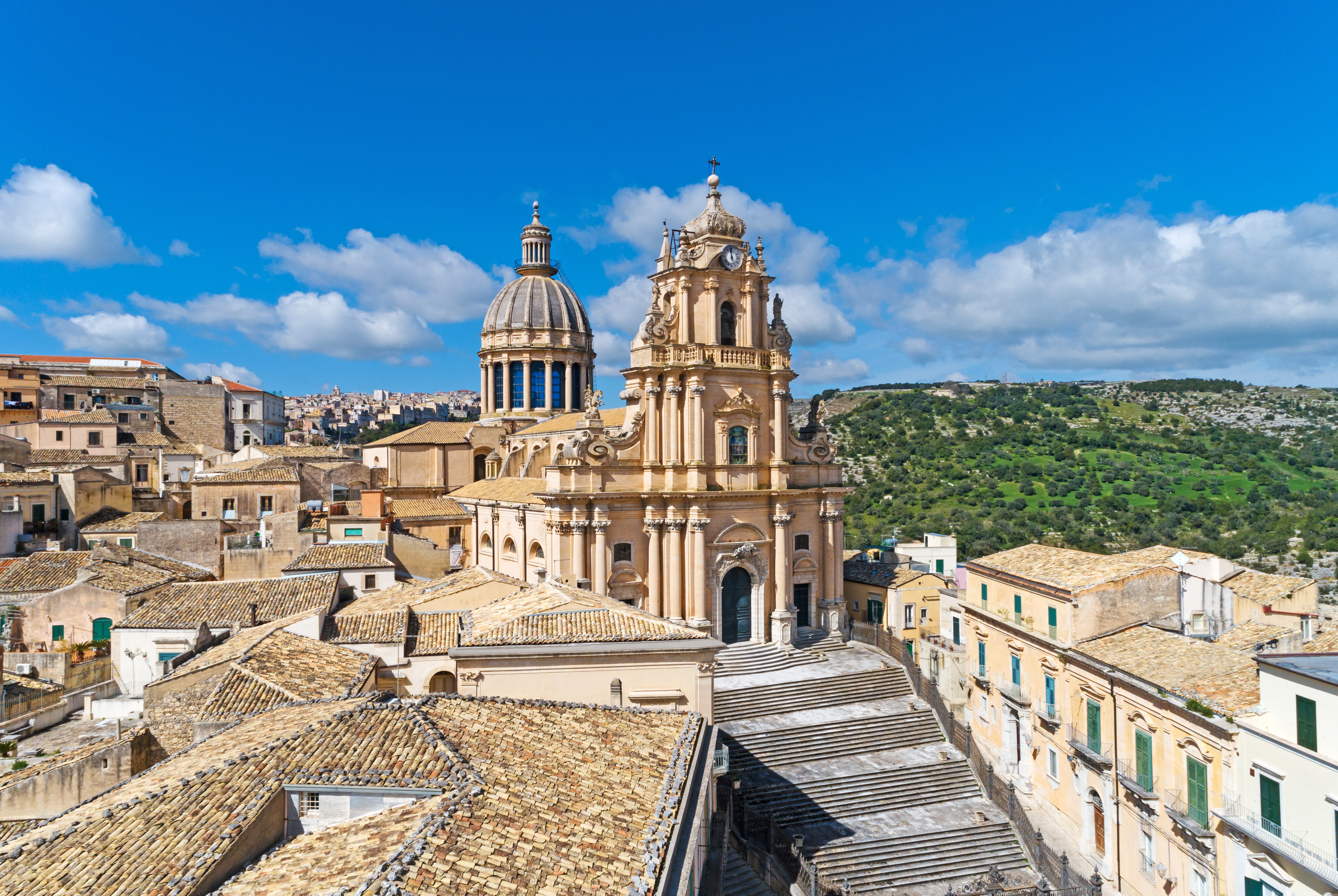

Religion
- Affiliation: Catholic Church
- Region: Diocese of Ragusa
- Rite: Roman

Location
- Location: Ragusa
- Country: Italy
- Interactive map of Duomo of San Giorgio

Architecture
- Architect: Rosario Gagliardi
- Style: Sicilian Baroque, neoclassical
- Groundbreaking: 1739
- Completed: circa 1775

The Duomo of San Giorgio (i.e. "Dome of St. George") is a Baroque church located in Ragusa Ibla, Sicily, Italy.

Its construction began in 1738 and ended in 1775.

The cathedral appears in the opening credits of the Italian TV series Inspector Montalbano, and it also features in some episodes, as does the similarly named cathedral of Modica.

== See also ==
- Catholic Church in Italy
