= Palazzo Beneventano del Bosco =

Coordinates: 37°03′36″N 15°17′34″E

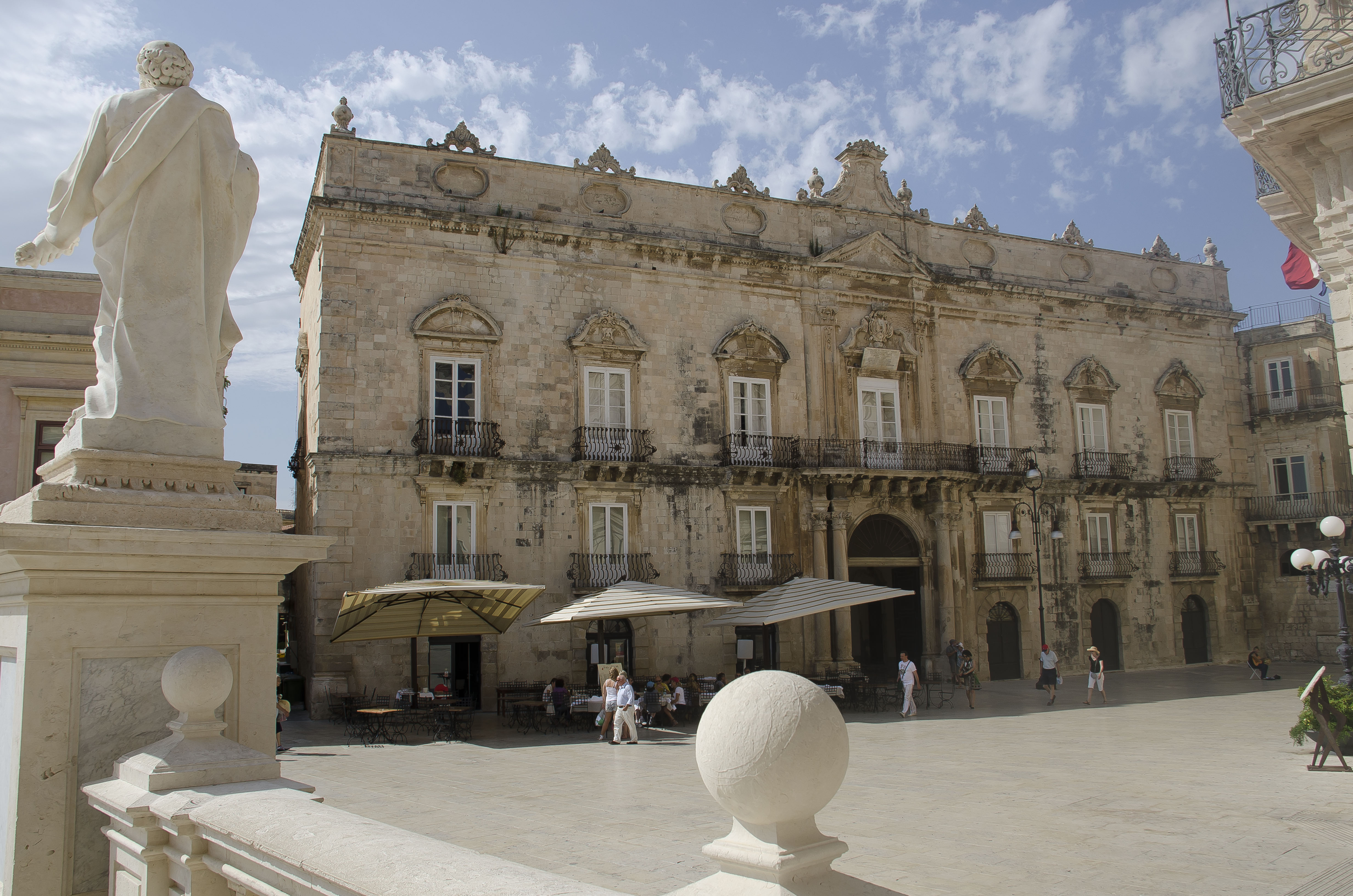
Facade

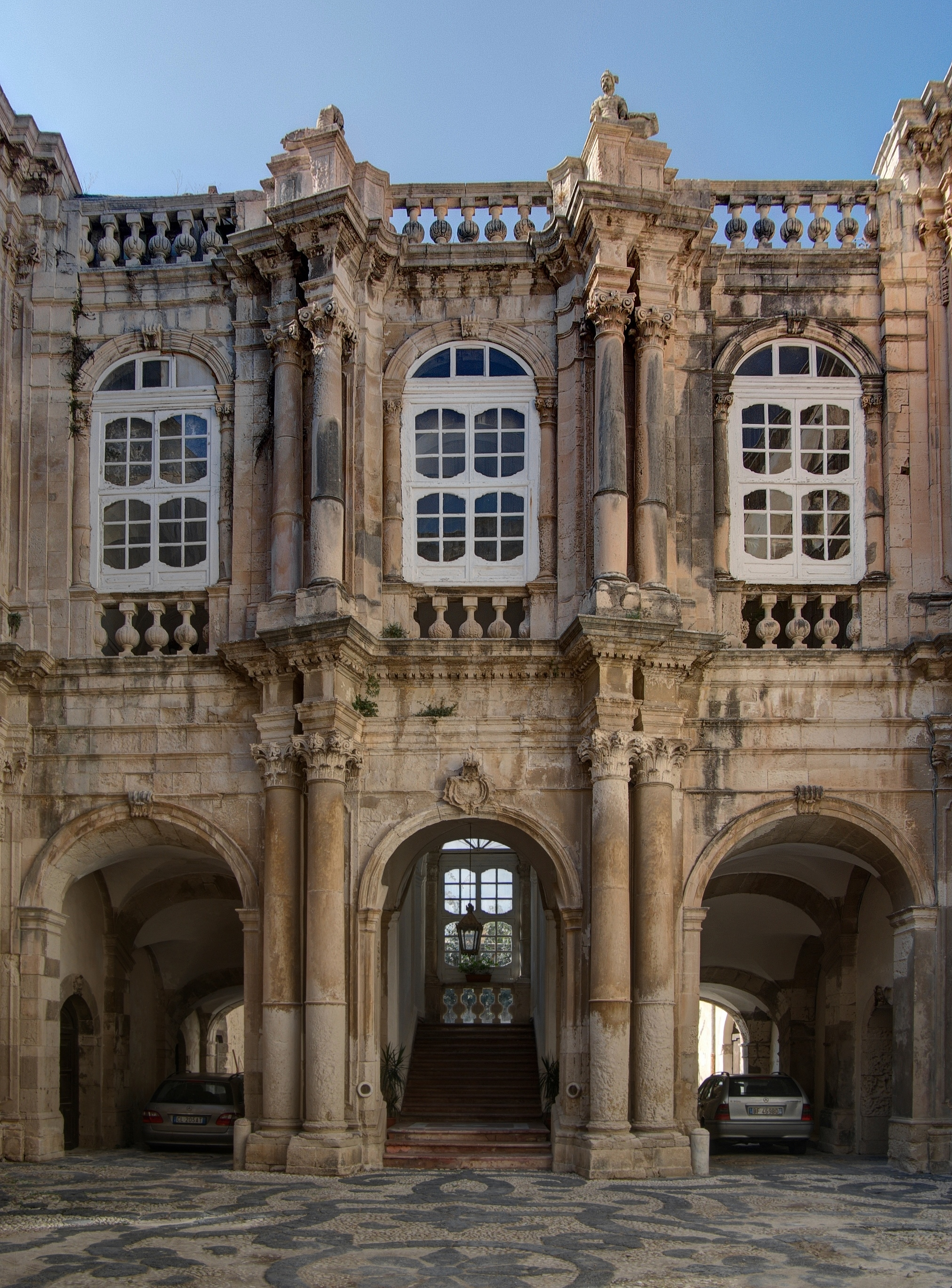
Inner courtyard of Palazzo Beneventano del Bosco.

The Palazzo Beneventano del Bosco is a large urban palace, located on piazza Duomo, across from the present city hall and diagonal to the Cathedral of Syracuse, in the island of Ortigia in the city of Syracuse in Sicily, Italy.

== Description ==
A palace at the site dates from the Middle Ages, when it was constructed for the Arezzo family. However, damaged by the 1693 Sicily earthquake, following its purchase by Baron Guglielmo Beneventano, the palace was rebuilt mainly between 1779 and 1788 in the Sicilian Baroque style.

Beneventano commissioned the design from the architect Luciano Alì, who transformed the medieval building, which had been used as a seat of local government, into a private house. Built around an enclosed courtyard, the internal courtyard has canted facades are adorned with twin columns, putti, and statuary, that accentuate the surface complexity with chiaroscuro.

The ornate design continues into the interior with sculptures by a Palermitano artist, Lombardic Gregorio, and frescoes by Ermenegido Martorana. To further create the air of fantasy and extravagance, huge crystal chandeliers were imported from Murano. The interior of the palazzo is not open to the public but can be viewed by special permission from the owners.

Palazzo Beneventano del Bosco at night
