= Palazzo Valguarnera-Gangi =

Palace in Palermo, Sicily, Italy

Coordinates: 38.11475°N 13.36577°E

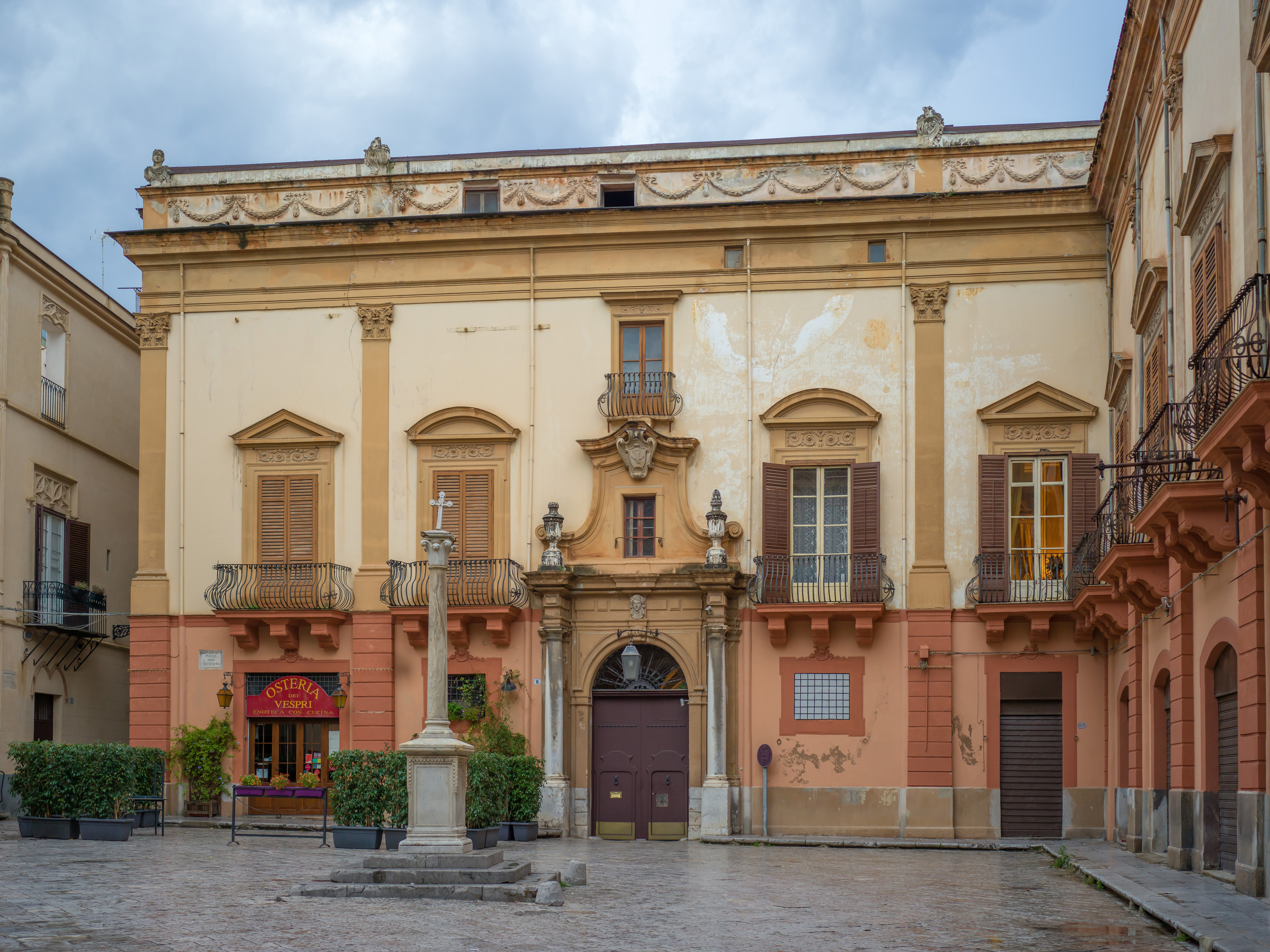
The palace on Piazza Croce dei Vespri

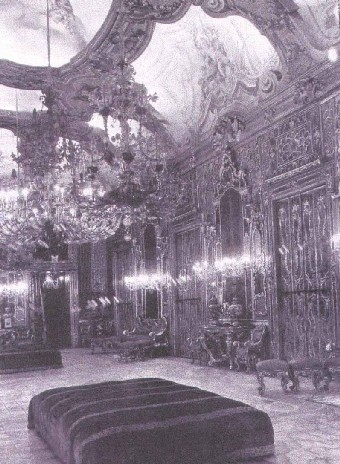
The ballroom of the Palazzo Gangi

Palazzo Valguarnera-Gangi is an urban palace, first of the Princes Valguarnera and then of the Princes Gangi, situated in the Piazza Croce dei Vespri, in the ancient quarter of the Kalsa in the city of Palermo, region of Sicily, Italy. The palace still retains its original rich Rococo interior decoration, and is located a block south of the church of Sant'Anna la Misericordia.

== History ==
The house was constructed in several phases during the 18th century and completed in circa 1780. The palace is designed in the Baroque style, although its ornamentation is of a more severe form in respect of what is generally accepted as Sicilian Baroque. The tall windows of the piano nobile are decorated with alternating pointed and segmented pediments, while the windows of the lower and upper floors are much smaller, almost cell like, indicating a more modest function of the rooms they belong. In this way the architecture could be said to be more Renaissance than Baroque.

In 1750 the interior was created in a Rococo style by Marianna Valguarnera, with special furniture in the very ornate style, created by local craftsmen. The creation of the house took so long that the Baroque style passed out of fashion in favour of the neoclassical style, and it was during this era that the large circular and domed dining room was created with its painted panels on the dome by Giuseppe Velasco.

In 1963 the palazzo, and most memorably its ballroom, were the setting for Luchino Visconti's film' Il Gattopardo (The Leopard). Today, while the famous ballroom may be hired for events, and some rooms toured by reservation; the rest of the house is still used as a private residence.
