= Paolo Labisi =

Italian architect

Paolo Labisi was an 18th-century Italian architect. He worked principally in the Baroque style. His most notable works are in the Sicilian town of Noto, which was completely rebuilt on a new site following the earthquake of 1693. Labisi's work later came to be known under the banner of Sicilian Baroque. His work on the Palazzo Villadorata in Noto is perhaps one of the finest examples of his talent, displaying puttini seemingly supporting balconies with intricate wrought iron balustrading.
