= Andrea Palma (architect) =

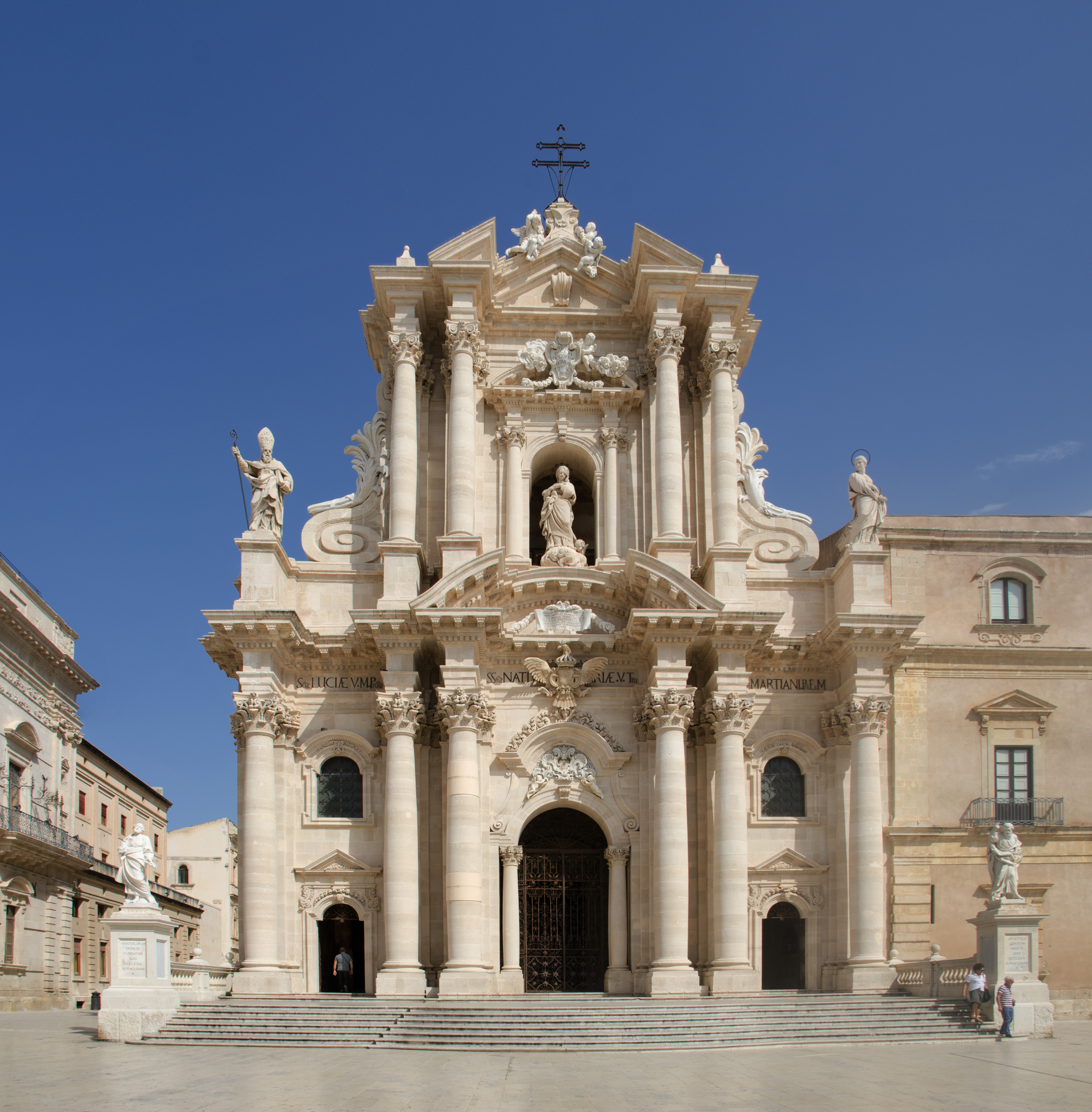
Cathedral of Syracuse; Andrea Palma's cathedral facade (begun in 1728). Based on the ideology of a Roman triumphal arch, the architect uses broken masses within a columned façade to a create a theatrical effect.

Andrea Palma (b. Trapani, 1644 or 1664 – d. 1730) was an 18th-century Italian architect, working in the Baroque style. He is credited with being one of the most notable architects of the Sicilian Baroque movement.

His works include the Cathedral of Syracuse, which was recognized by UNESCO as a World Heritage Site. Other works by Palma include "Chiesa di Santa Maria di Montevergini", and the Chiesa di San Gioacchino, whose baroque facade he designed in the early 18th century.
