= Giuseppe Lanza =

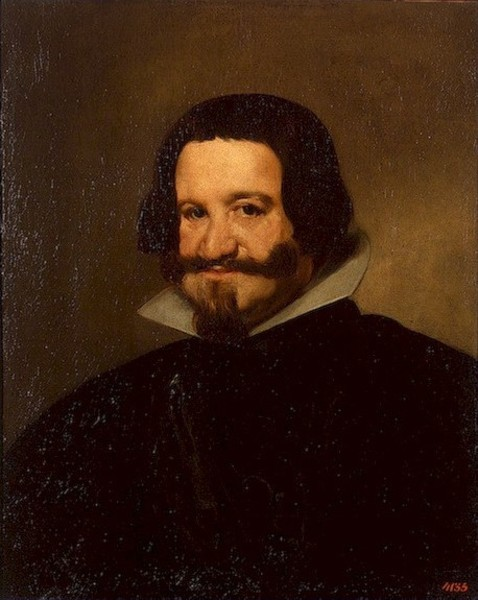
A portrait of Giuseppe Lanza

Giuseppe Lanza, Duke of Camastra, was a 17th-century Sicilian nobleman who oversaw the reconstruction of many Sicilian towns and cities following the earthquake of 1693.

He was created 1st Duke of Camastra, and Prince of Santo Stefano. He married twice, his first wife, whom he married in Palermo in 1668 was Maria Gomez de Sylveira, Principessa di Santo Stefano, the daughter of Luigi Gomez de Sylveira and Giovanna Ferreri, she died in 1675. His second wife was Melchiorra Castello, daughter of Gregorio Castello, Principe di Castelferrato and Anna Marchese.

His daughter Giovanna Lanza, Duchessa di Camastra married her kinsman Ignazio Lanza, the 4th Prince of Trabia. The surname is today Lanza Branciforte.

== Sources ==
- Genealogisches Handbuch des Adels Fuerstliche Haeuser
