= San Giorgio Cathedral, Modica =

Roman Catholic Cathedral in Modica, Italy

Coordinates: 36.8640°N 14.7616°E

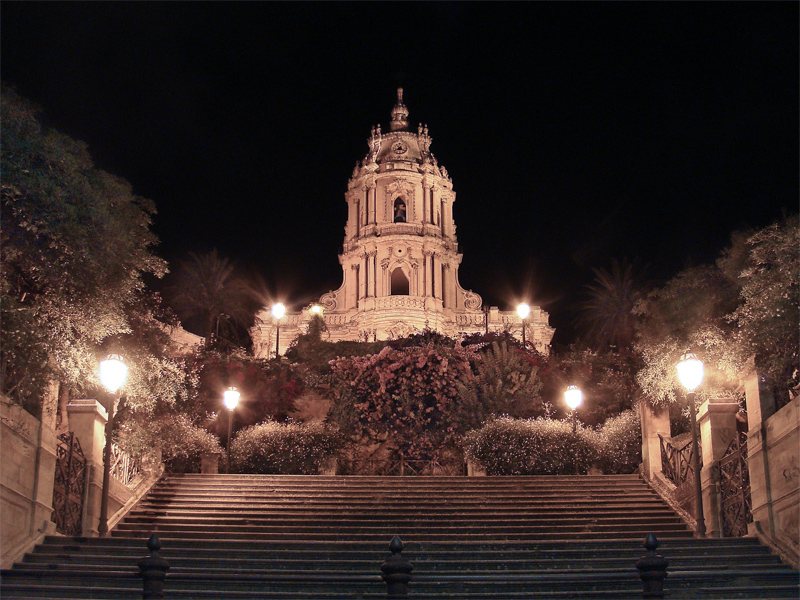
Duomo of San Giorgio

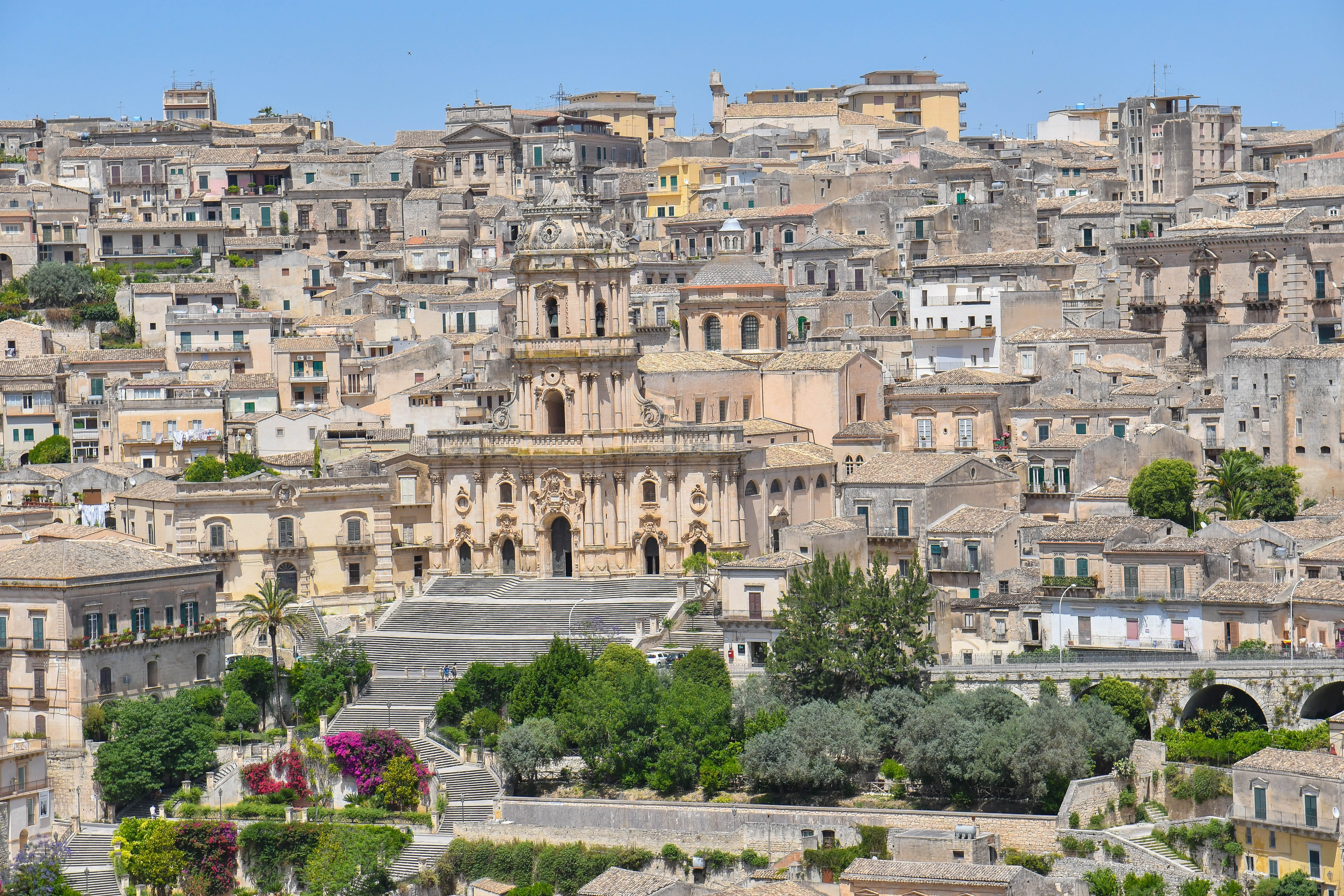
Duomo of San Giorgio in Modica

The Duomo of San Giorgio (English: Cathedral of St George) is a Baroque church in Modica, Ragusa, Sicily, Italy. It is the mother church of the city and is included in the World Heritage List by UNESCO.

The building is the final result of the eighteenth-century reconstruction which took place following the disastrous earthquakes that struck Modica in 1542, 1613, and 1693. Reconstruction began in 1702 and ended in 1738. Further work was done until the affixing of the iron cross on the spire in 1842, which marked the definitive appearance of the church.

According to art historian Maurizio Fagiolo dell'Arco, the church should be included among "the seven wonders of the baroque world".
