= St. Sebastian's Church =

St. Sebastian's Church, St. Sebastian Church, San Sebastian Church or St. Sebastian Parish Church may refer to:

== Brazil ==
- St. Sebastian Church, Manaus, Amazonas

== Germany ==
- Church of St. Fabian and St. Sebastian, Sülze, an Evangelical-Lutheran parish church

== India ==
- St. Sebastian Church, Papanasam
- St Sebastian's Church, Neyyassery
- St. Sebastian's Church, Chemmakkad of the Roman Catholic Diocese of Quilon
- St. Sebastian's Syro-Malabar Catholic Church, Udayamperoor
- St. Sebastian's Church (Dilshad Garden)
- St. Sebastian's Church, Chittattukara

== Italy ==
- San Sebastiano, Palazzolo Acreide, a Baroque church in Palazzolo Acreide, Sicily
- San Sebastiano, Verona, a former church in Verona destroyed in World War II

== Malta ==
- Church of St Sebastian, Qormi
- Old Church of St Sebastian, Qormi

== Peru ==
- St. Sebastian's Church, Lima

== Philippines ==
- San Sebastian Church (Manila), Quiapo, Manila
- San Sebastian Parish Church (Lumban), Laguna

== Spain ==
- St Sebastian's Church, Madrid

== Sri Lanka ==
- St. Sebastian's Cathedral, Mannar
- St. Sebastian's Church, Katuwapitiya
- St. Sebastian's Church, Wellaweediya

== United States ==
- St. Sebastian Church (Middletown, Connecticut)
- St. Sebastian Roman Catholic Church (Queens), New York City
- St. Sebastian's Catholic Church (Sebastian, Ohio)
