= Palazzo Nicolaci di Villadorata =

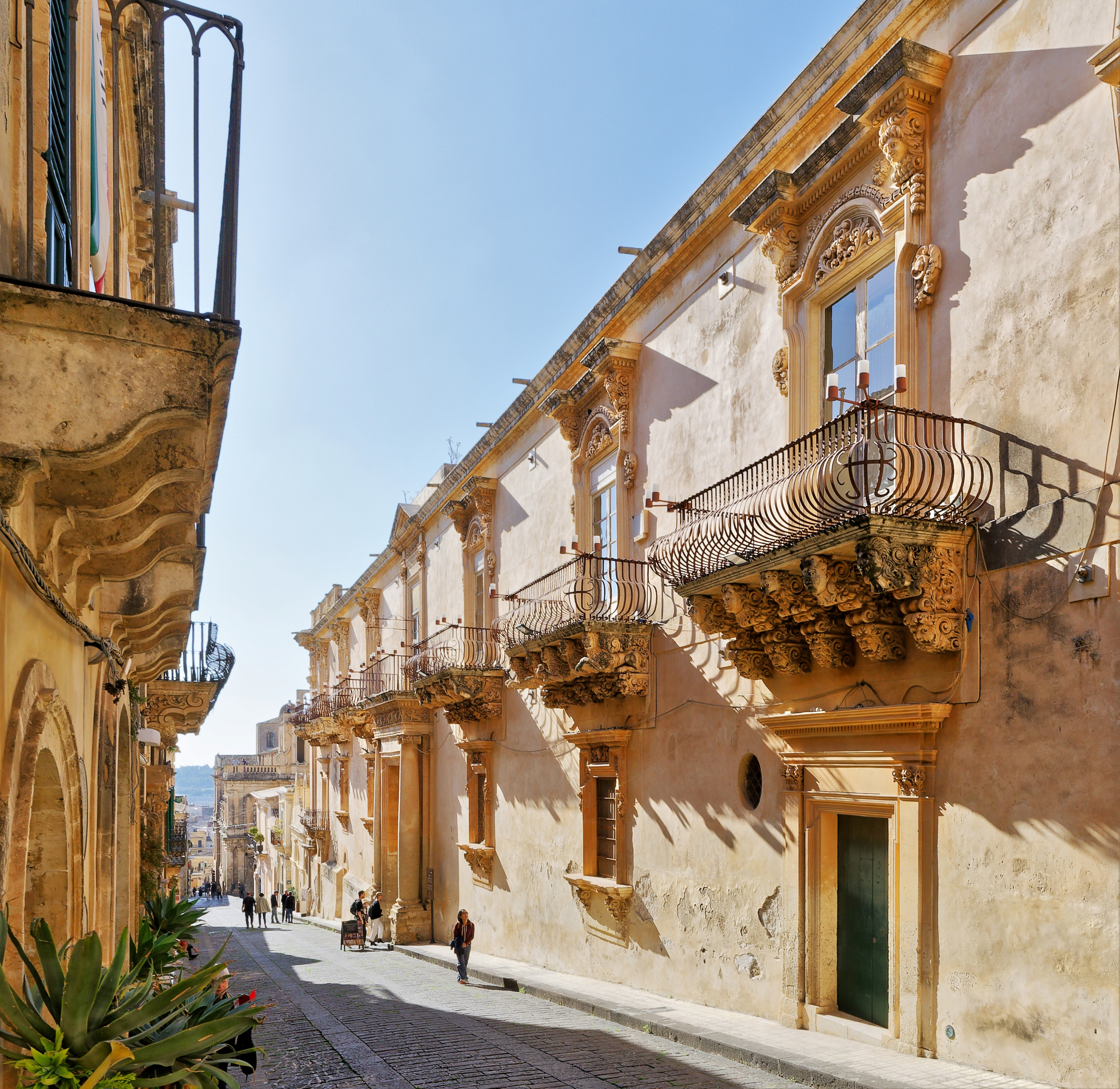
- Palazzo Nicolaci di Villadorata in Noto
- Click on the map for a fullscreen view

General information
- Architectural style: Baroque
- Location: Noto, Italy
- Coordinates: 36°53′30.87″N 15°4′11.33″E

Design and construction
- Architect(s): Rosario Gagliardi

Palazzo Nicolaci di Villadorata is a historic building situated in Noto, Italy.

== History ==
Construction works of the building started in the first half of the 18th century with the likely participation of architects Rosario Gagliardi, Vincenzo Sinatra and Francesco Paolo Labisi, and were completed in 1765.

== Description ==
The building features a Baroque style. The façade is characterized by a large portal flanked by two grand Ionic columns and topped by a balcony. On each side of the portal there are three smaller balconies, supported by large corbels, each sculpted differently with the appearances of lions, children, centaurs, winged horses, chimeras, and sirens.
