= St. Sebastian's Church, Negombo =

St. Sebastian's Church, Negombo may refer to:

- St. Sebastian's Church, Wellaweediya
- St. Sebastian's Church, Katuwapitiya
