= San Filippo Neri, Siracusa =

Church in Sicily, Italy

Filippo Neri
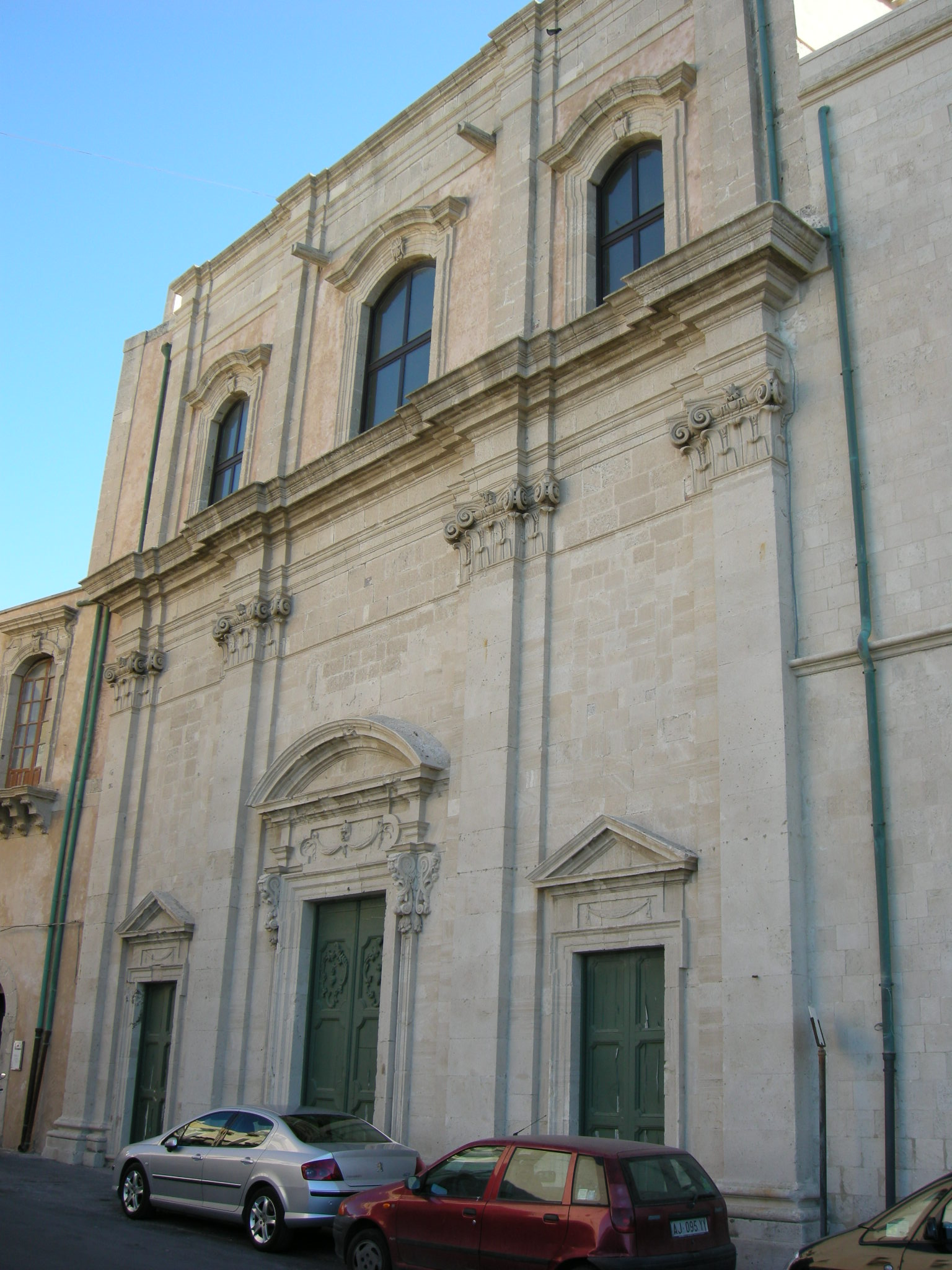
- Facade of church

Religion
- Affiliation: Catholic Church
- Province: Siracusa

Location
- Location: Siracusa, Italy
- Interactive map of Filippo Neri
- Coordinates: 37°03′45″N 15°17′47″E

Architecture
- Type: Church
- Style: Baroque

San Filippo Neri is a baroque-style, Roman Catholic church located on via Vittorio Veneto, facing seaside, on the island of Ortigia, in the historic city center of Siracusa in Sicily, Italy.

== Description ==
The Oratorians established a home in Siracusa in 1650 under the patronage of the aristocrat Margherita De Grandi, whose grandson was a priest. A church at this site was refurbished in 1669 by designs of Giovanni Vermexio. A prior church here belonged to the benedictine monastery of Santa Caterina da Siena, founded in 1614, but which was fused with the Benedictine monastery dell'Annunziata.

This new church was rebuilt after the 1693 Sicily earthquake, standing next to the former Interlandi palace, with its broad rounded portal, asymmetrically placed on the facade. The two story facade is framed by echoing doric pilasters and a protruding first floor cornice. The portal tympanums are comprised by triangles, and a semicircular central tympanum. There is a sparsity of sculptural decoration, except for the whimsical masks and sireneic caryatids around the central portal, with windows reserved for the second story. Just lateral to the upper left corner of the central portal, there is a small lizard carving, a signature insignia of the architect Vermexio, who also worked on Santa Lucia extra moenia and Santa Lucia al Sepolcro. The interior has an roughly oval interior, with a white sandstone floor with floral dark basalt inlays. The interior layout and decoration is attributed in part to the architect Rosario Gagliardi.

In 1741, the oratory was converted in the Collegio di San Carlo, and places under the adeministration of the Bishop Monsignor Testa. The rebuilt church was not reconsecrated until 1770. The Oratorians and the Collegio were suppressed in 1866. The locale was used as a high school, but the church was soon granted to a local lay confraternity, once associated with the church of Santa Maria d'Idria. Later it served as a neighborhood parish. The church suffered damage during World War I. In the past century, a passage from the adjacent convent was made into the apse, and two altars from the former church of San Tommaso in via Mirabella were moved here. The altarpiece flanking the right nave is a 19th century depiction of Christ in the Orchard by Giuseppe Mancinelli, was commissioned by Marchesa Anna Gargallo. A number of late baroque canvases, including the main altarpiece in the church appear to be from followers of Mario Minniti.
