= Palazzolo Acreide =

- Comune
- Comune di Palazzolo Acreide
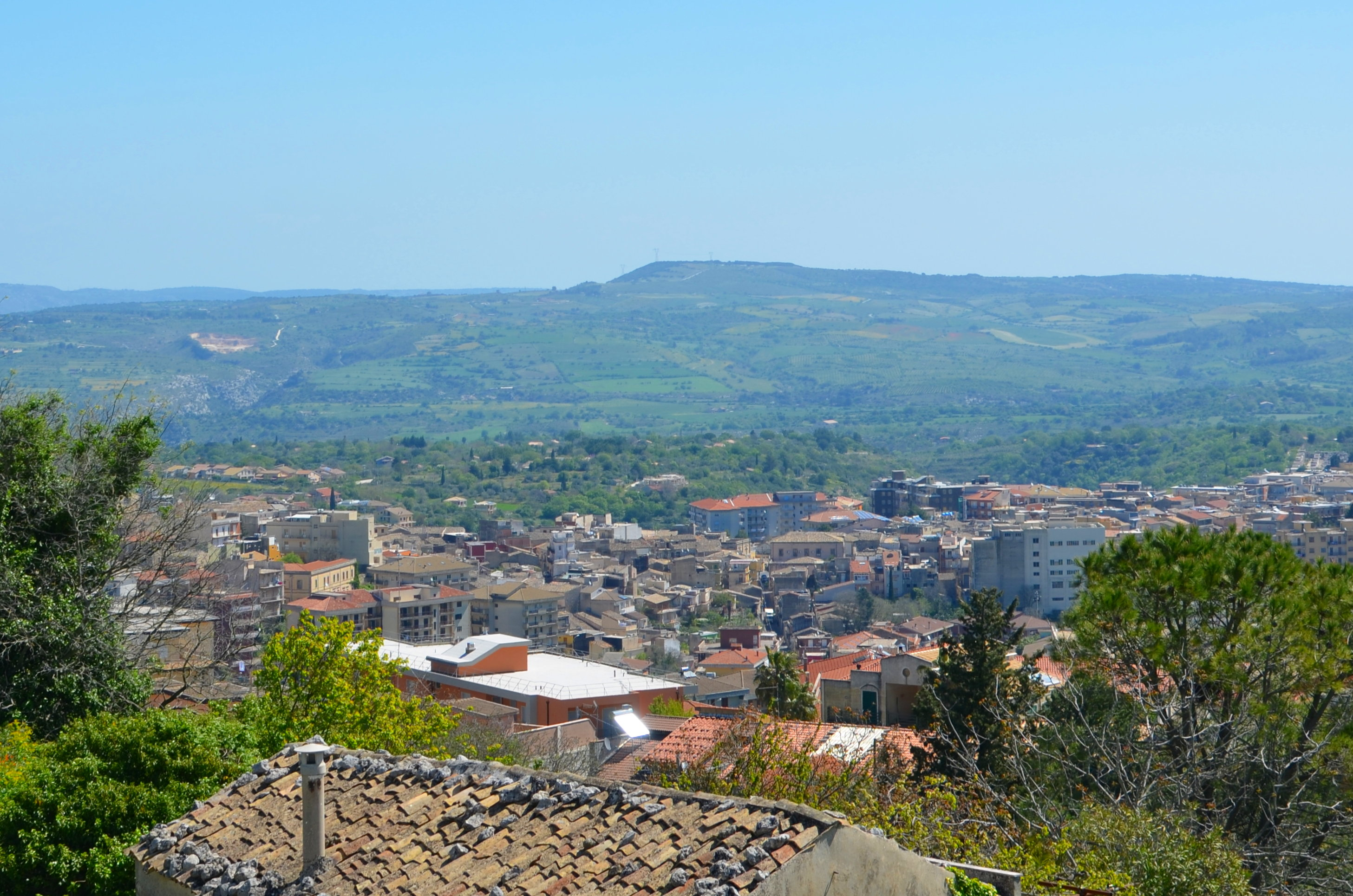
- View of the town from the acropolis of ancient Akrai

- Location within Italy Location within Sicily
- Coordinates: 37°04′N 14°54′E
- Country: Italy
- Region: Sicily
- Province: Syracuse (SR)

Government
  - Mayor: Salvatore Gallo

Area
  - Total: 86.34 km^{2} (33.34 sq mi)
- Elevation: 670 m (2,200 ft)

Population (30 November 2017)
  - Total: 8,668
  - Density: 100.4/km^{2} (260.0/sq mi)
- Demonym: Palazzolesi
- Time zone: UTC+1 (CET)
  - Summer (DST): UTC+2 (CEST)
- Postal code: 96010
- Dialing code: 0931
- Patron saint: St. Paul
- Saint day: June 29
- Website: Official website

UNESCO World Heritage Site
- Part of: Late Baroque Towns of the Val di Noto (South-Eastern Sicily)
- Criteria: Cultural: (i)(ii)(iv)(v)
- Reference: 1024rev-006
- Inscription: 2002 (26th Session)
- Area: 1.37 ha (147,000 sq ft)
- Buffer zone: 33.74 ha (3,632,000 sq ft)

Palazzolo Acreide (Sicilian: Palazzolu, in the local dialect: Palazzuolu) is a town and comune in the Province of Syracuse, Sicily (southern Italy). It is 43 kilometres (27 mi) from the city of Syracuse in the Hyblean Mountains. It is one of I Borghi più belli d'Italia ("The most beautiful villages of Italy").

== History ==
The area around Palazzolo Acreide has been inhabited since ancient times. In the 10th-11th centuries BC, the Sicels lived here in small villages. The town occupies the site of the ancient Akrai (Latin Acrae), founded by Syracuse around 664 BC. The city was important as it controlled the paths of communication between the towns on the southern coast of the island. According to Thucydides, the Syracusans defeated the Athenians here in 413 BC.

In the treaty between the Romans and Hiero II of Syracuse in 263 BC it was assigned to the latter. After the Roman conquest, it became a civitas stipendiaria, and was still prospering in the course of the early Christian age.

The old city was probably destroyed by the Arabs, in the first half of the 9th century. The new city was built around a Norman castle, which no longer exists. An earthquake in 1693 destroyed almost the entire city, which was slowly rebuilt in the following centuries.

=== Ancient city ===
The Ancient City lies on the hill above the modern town, the approach to it being defended by quarries, in which tombs of all periods have been discovered. The auditorium of the small theatre is well-preserved, though nothing of the stage remains. Nearby are the ruins of other buildings, which bear, without justification, the names Naumachia, Odeum (perhaps a bath establishment) and Palace of Hiero. The water supply was obtained by subterranean aqueducts. In the cliffs of the Monte Pineta to the south are other burial niches, and curious bas-reliefs called Santoni or Santicelli, carved in the 19th century by a peasant proprietor, which also appear to be related to funeral ceremonies. Also nearby is the necropolis of the Acrocoro della Torre, where many sarcophagi have been found. About 5 miles (8 km) north lies Buscemi, near which a sacred grotto has been discovered; and also a church cut into the rock and surrounded by a cemetery.

== Economy ==
The economy of Palazzolo Acreide relies mainly on agriculture (cereals) and farming of cattle and sheep. The population in 2009 was approximately 9,000, on a downward trend to about 8,500 by 2019.

== Sports ==
The major football club of the comune is A.S.D. S.C. Palazzolo. It replaced A.C. Palazzolo A.S.D. which relocated elsewhere in 2013.

== Main sights ==
- San Sebastiano (15th century) -church rebuilt after the 17th century).
- San Paolo (18th century) -Basilica church
- Church of Santa Maria della Medaglia.
- Church of San Michele (15th to 16th centuries, rebuilt after 1693). It is a typical example of "minor Sicilian Baroque", with a notable belfry covered by a cupola.
- Church of the Assunta or Immacolata (18th century). It has a convex façade and a single nave interior, with rich decorations. It houses a statue of the Madonna, in Carrara white marble, sculpted by Francesco Laurana in 1471–72.
- Church of St. Anthony (18th century), unfinished, with a neo-Romanesque façade.
- The Chiesa Madre ("Mother Church"). The first document attesting its existence dates from 1215, when the church was dedicated to St. Nicholas. It was largely rebuilt and redecorated after the earthquake of 1693, with a Neo-classicist façade. The interior is on the Latin cross plan, with a nave and two aisles decorated with precious polychrome marbles.
- Antonino Uccello's Museum House. It houses artifacts and remains from the peasant civilization of Sicily, including working tools, glass paintings, wax statues and others.
- Palazzo Cappellani, where the Archaeological Museum is located (soon to be opened).
- Grotto of St. Conrad, a small church carved in a cliff, on the site where the hermit Corrado Confalonieri retired in the 14th century. Traces of mosaics and the base of the altar remain.
- "Il Teatro Greco di Akrai" (Ancient Greek theater)
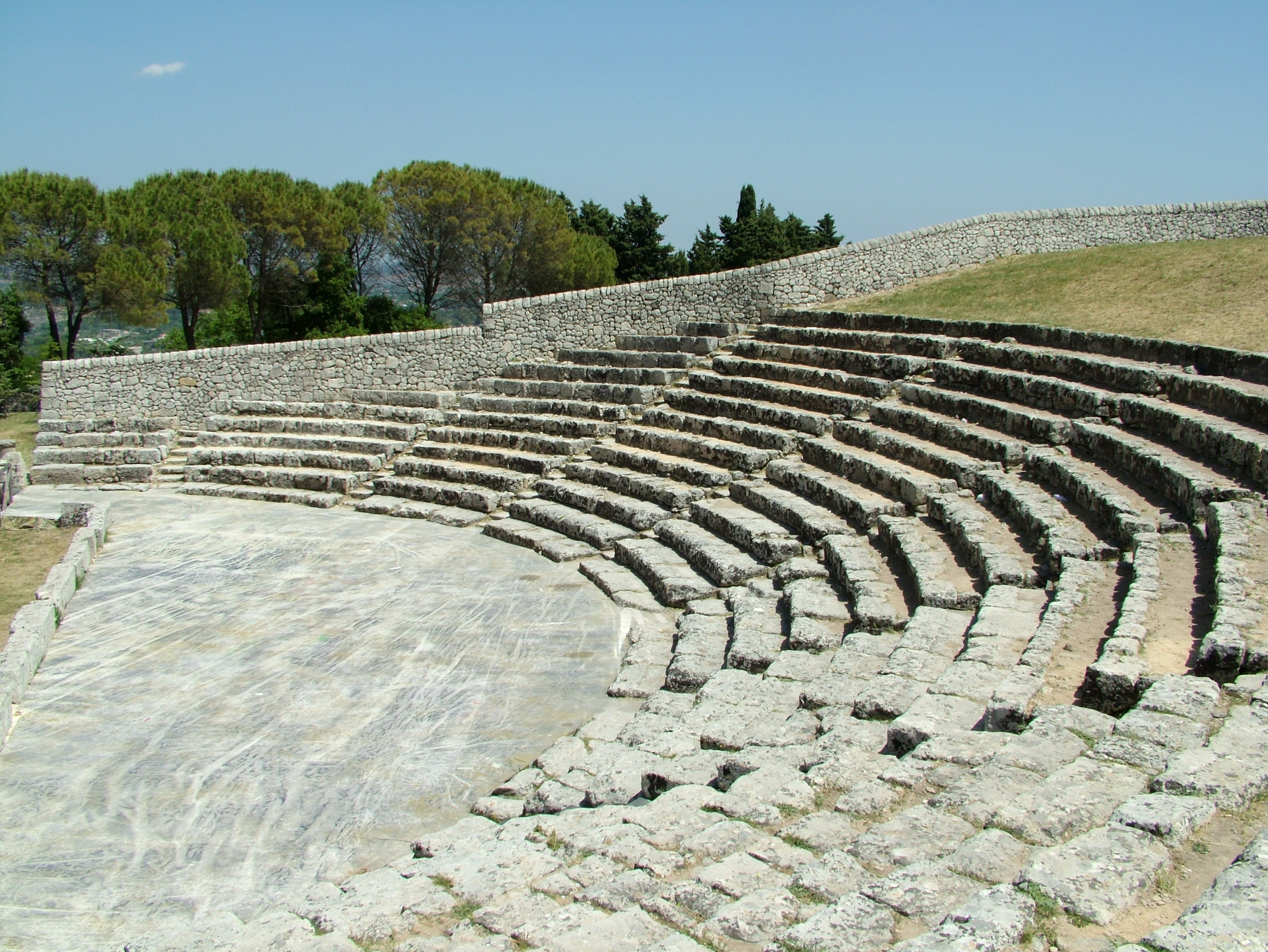
  The Greek theater of ancient Akrai

== Personalities ==
- Francesco Carpino (1905–1993), cardinal
- Turi Golino (1920–2000), trumpeter and composer
- Antonino Uccello (1922–1979), poet and anthropologist
- Giuseppe Fava (1925–1984), investigative journalist, playwright, essayist and anti-mafia activist who ultimately was murdered by the Sicilian Mafia.
- Gaetano Giuliano (1929–2023), politician
- Silvia Salemi (1978–), singer
