= Gaetano Giuliano =

Italian politician (1929–2023)

President of Sicily (acting)
- In office 6 January 1980 – 1 May 1980

Personal details
- Born: 23 July 1929 Palazzolo Acreide, Italy
- Died: 3 December 2023 (aged 94) Palazzolo Acreide, Italy
- Party: Italian Socialist Party

Gaetano Giuliano (23 July 1929 – 3 December 2023) was an Italian politician. In 1980 he served as Acting President of the Sicilian Region. Giuliano died on 3 December 2023, at the age of 94.
