= Palazzo Ducezio =

- Palazzo Ducezio in 2012
- Click on the map for a fullscreen view

General information
- Location: Noto, Italy
- Coordinates: 36°53′26.732″N 15°4′14.128″E

Design and construction
- Architect: Vincenzo Sinatra

Palazzo Ducezio is the town hall of the town of Noto, in Sicily.

== History ==
Construction works of the building were started by architect Vincenzo Sinatra in 1746, drawing inspiration from some French palaces of the 17th century. The Palazzo Ducezio, seat of the Town Hall, was built around 1760. The oval Hall known as the Hall of Mirrors was enriched with stucco and gold in Louis XV style and with sumptuous mirrors at the end of the nineteenth century. At the beginning of the 1930s, on the occasion of the official visit of Umberto and Marie-José, Princes of Piedmont, the hall was restored by the painter Gregorietti. The furnishings were made by the master Dugo, craftsman of the Franza Company.

Palazzo Ducezio (Night view)

The central painting on the vault, attributed to Antonimo Mazza, was made in 1826, and depicts an allegory of Ducezio, king of the Siculi, to whom an officer of the Engineers shows the site of Neas on Mount Alveria. Site on which in the pre-Hellenic age the fortified city of Noto Antica was rebuilt, to defend against the attack of the Greeks. In the side panels there are inscriptions that relate to the glories of the city of Noto; and expressions taken from Diodorus Siculus, Littara and Randazzo. On the left side there is also a telegram from Garibaldi to the patriots of Noto from 1860. The Hall of Mirrors is the city's reception room, and continues to host illustrious delegations and prestigious events, such as the signing of the memorandum of understanding between the Eight UNESCO Municipalities for the creation of the cultural district. The hall has been used to receive many Heads of State. After being closed in the 1990s, it was reopened after restoration on 14 July 2001, on the occasion of the visit of the delegation of the Hungarian Government, for the twinning between the city and Hungary, for the two poets Sador Petofi and Giuseppe Cassone, the latter being the Italian translator of the Hungarian poet. On that occasion, the Hungarian Government donated a marble bust placed at the entrance of the Town Hall.

== Description ==
The façade, convex in shape, is characterized by twenty arches supported by Ionic order columns on the lower floor, and thirteen rectangular windows in the upper floor. Inside, the Hall of Mirrors is noteworthy. This is an oval-shaped hall furnished with Louis XV-style furniture and large mirrors carved by Avoli artist Sebastiano Dugo. Adorning the ceiling of the hall is The Foundation of Neas, a neoclassical fresco by painter Antonio Mazza depicting the foundation of Noto by Sicilian leader Ducetius.

== Gallery ==
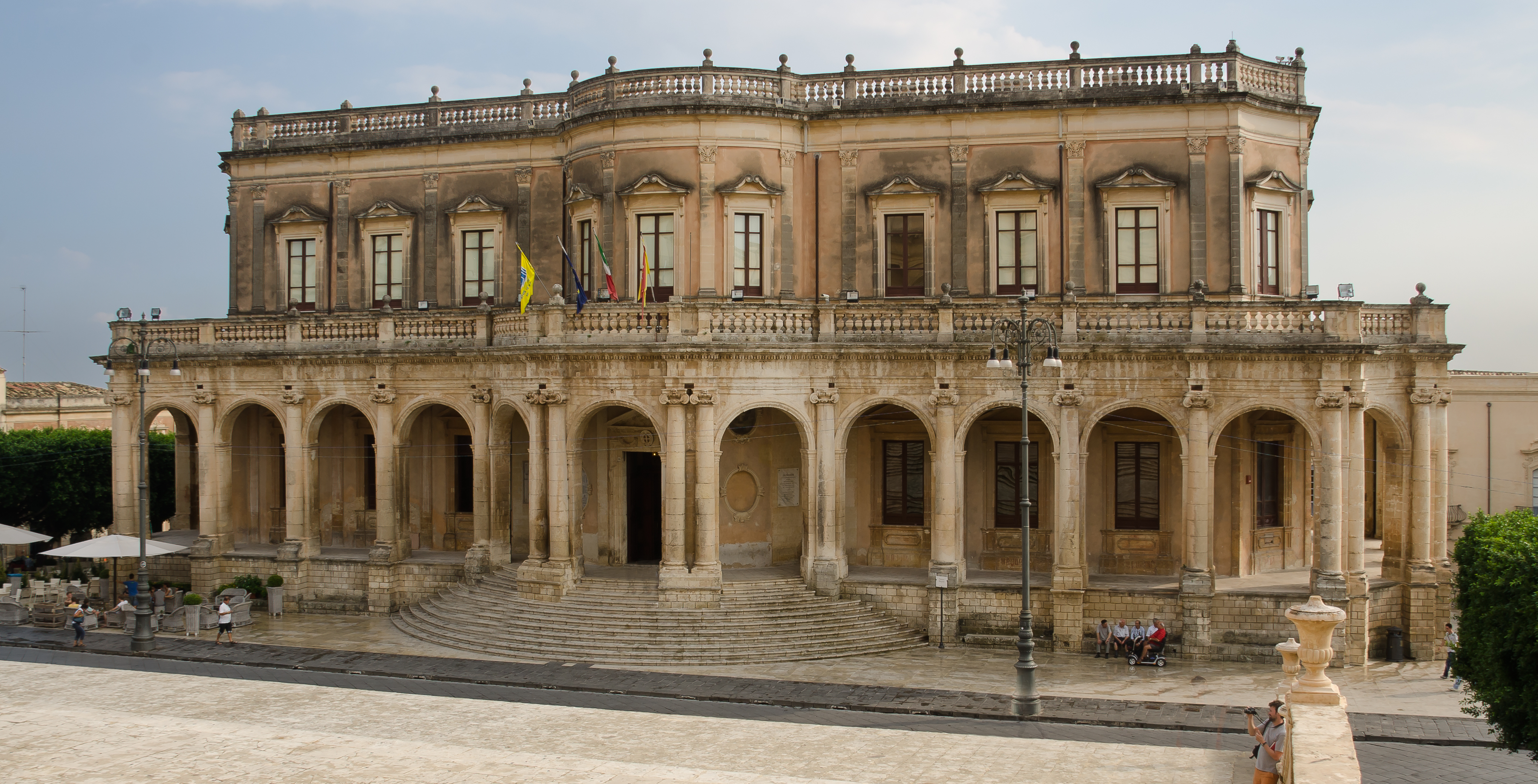

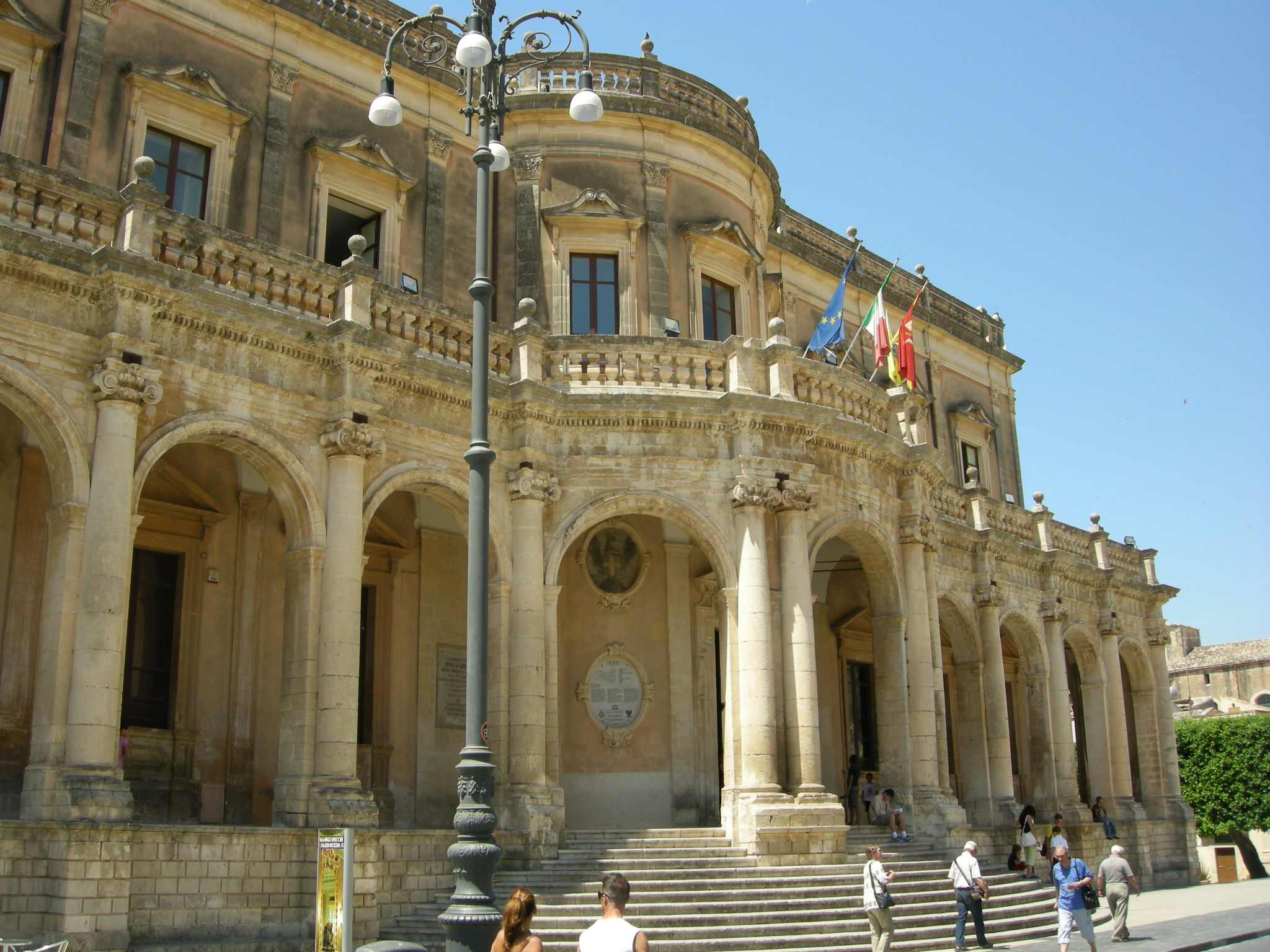

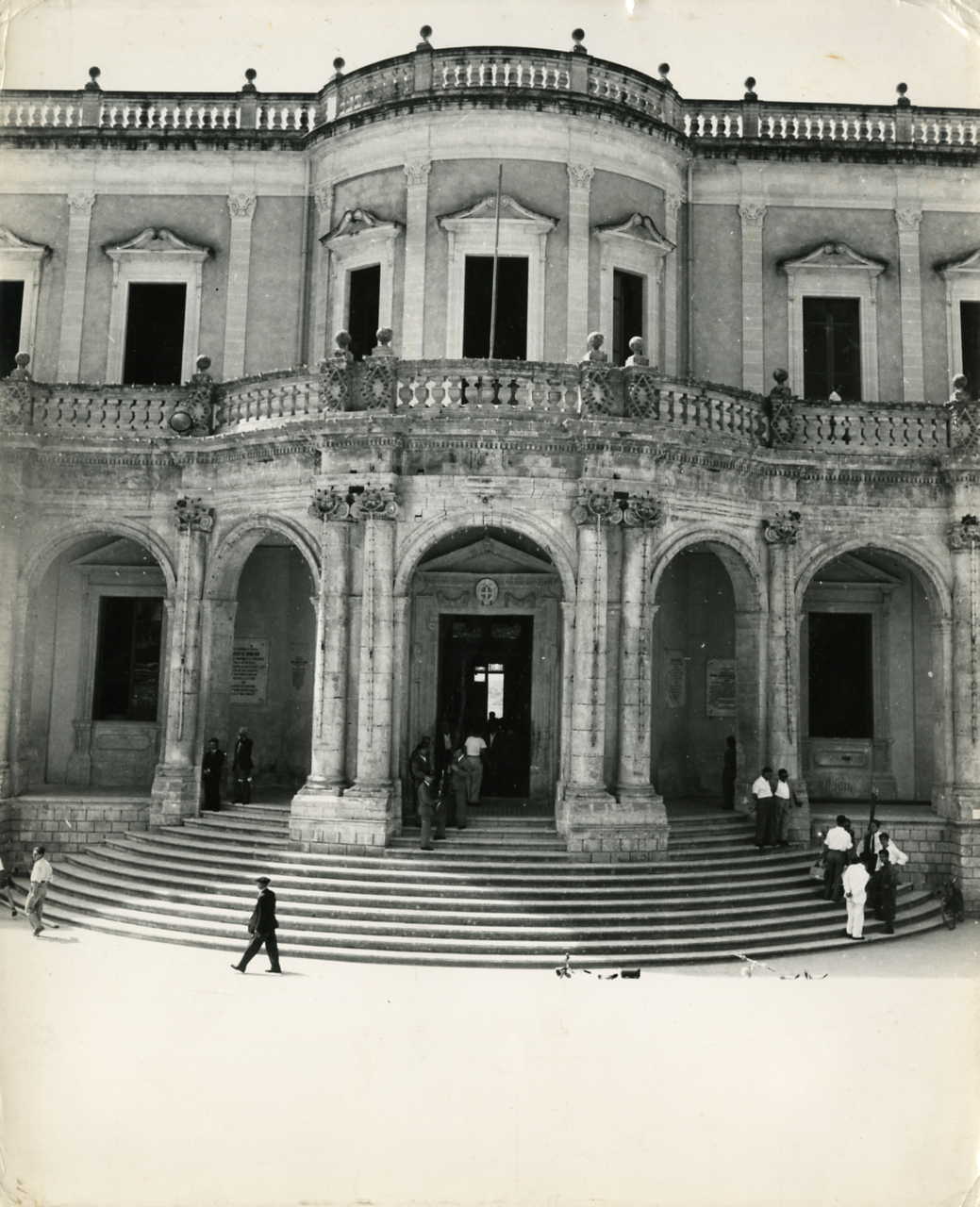
