= Saint John Church (Middletown, Connecticut) =

Historic church in Connecticut, United States

- Saint John the Evangelist Roman Catholic Church & Parish
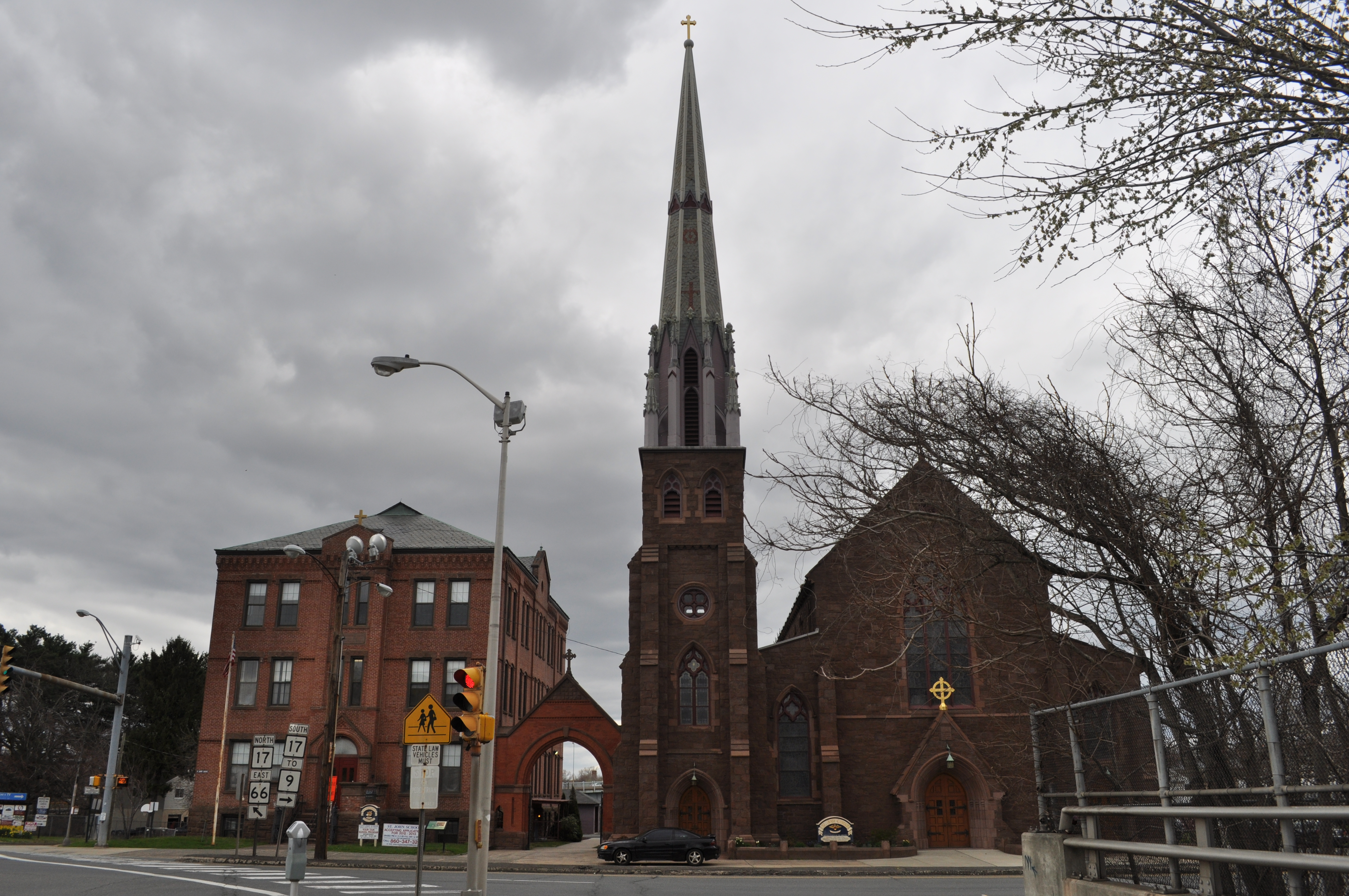
- Saint John Church in 2002
- Saint John Church
- 41.566479°N 72.651886°W
- Location: 9 St. John Square; Middletown, Connecticut
- Country: United States
- Denomination: Roman Catholic
- Website: saintjohnmiddletownct.weebly.com

History
- Founded: September 30, 1843
- Founder: Irish Immigrants of Middletown
- Dedication: Saint John
- Dedicated: September 05, 1852
- Consecrated: September 10, 1886

Administration
- Province: Hartford
- Diocese: Norwich
- Deanery: Middletown Deanery
- Parish: Saint John

Clergy
- Pastor: Gregory P. Galvin
- St. John Roman Catholic Church
- U.S. Historic district – Contributing property
- Built: 1843
- Architect: Patrick Charles Keely
- Architectural style: Gothic Revival
- Part of: Main Street Historic District (Middletown, CT) (ID83001275)
- Designated CP: June 3, 1983

Saint John Church is a Roman Catholic church and parish in Middletown, Connecticut, part of the Diocese of Norwich.

== History ==
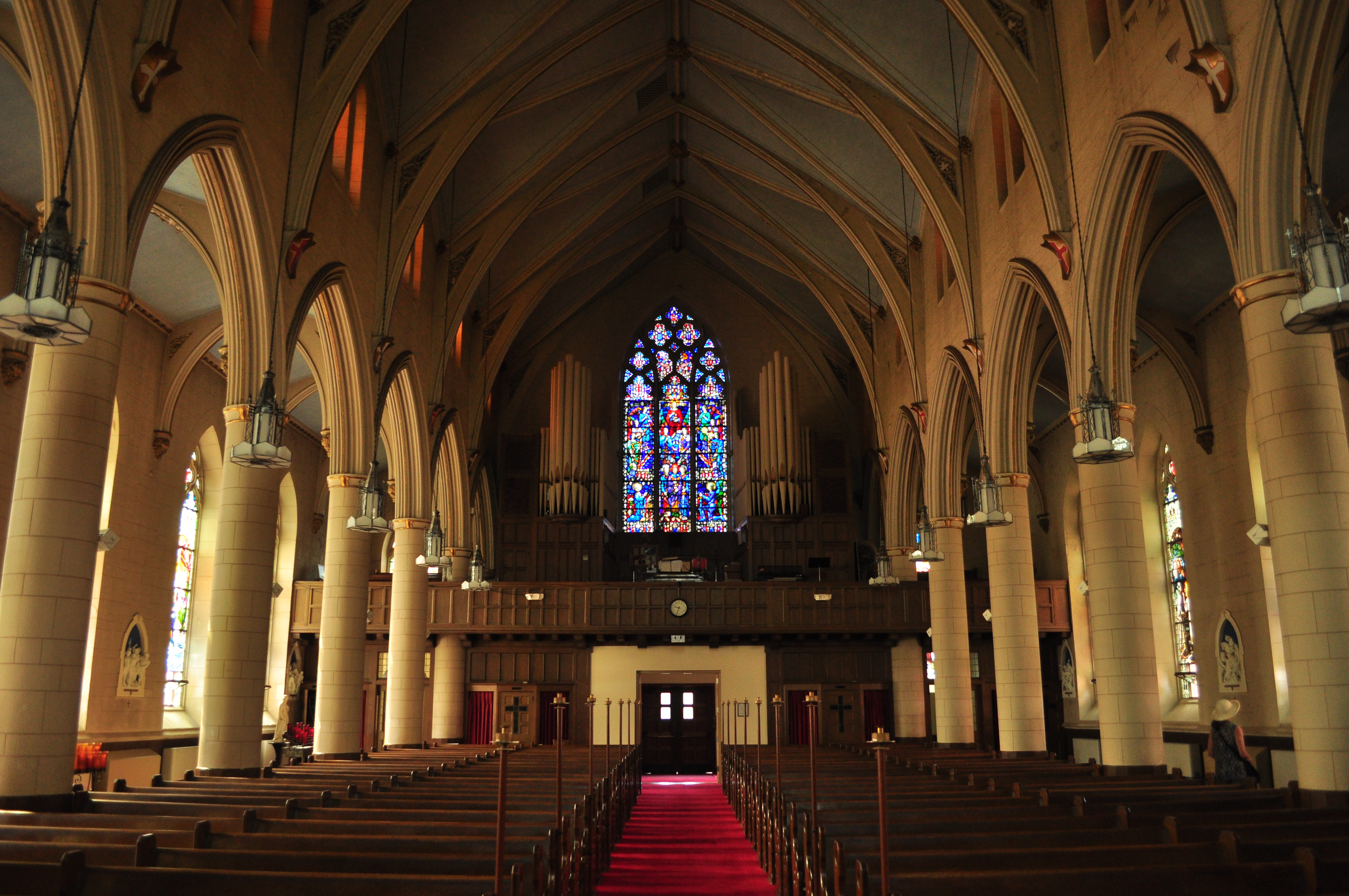
Interior of St. John's

In the early 19th Century, immigrants from Ireland moved in large numbers to Middletown. By 1830 there were enough families there to form a vibrant and close-knit Irish community that desired its own place of worship. In 1841, two acres of land were purchased on the current site of the church. Most of the future parishioners of Saint John worked across the river in the brownstone quarries of Portland and the owners of the quarries donated large blocks of brownstone to help build the first church.

== Oldest church of the diocese ==
Saint John Church was built back in 1843, predating the erection of the Diocese of Norwich on August 6, 1953, by Pope Pius XII, making it the oldest church in the newly organized diocese. The Diocese of Norwich was split from the Diocese of Hartford in 1953, after which Hartford was elevated to an archdiocese.

== Buildings ==
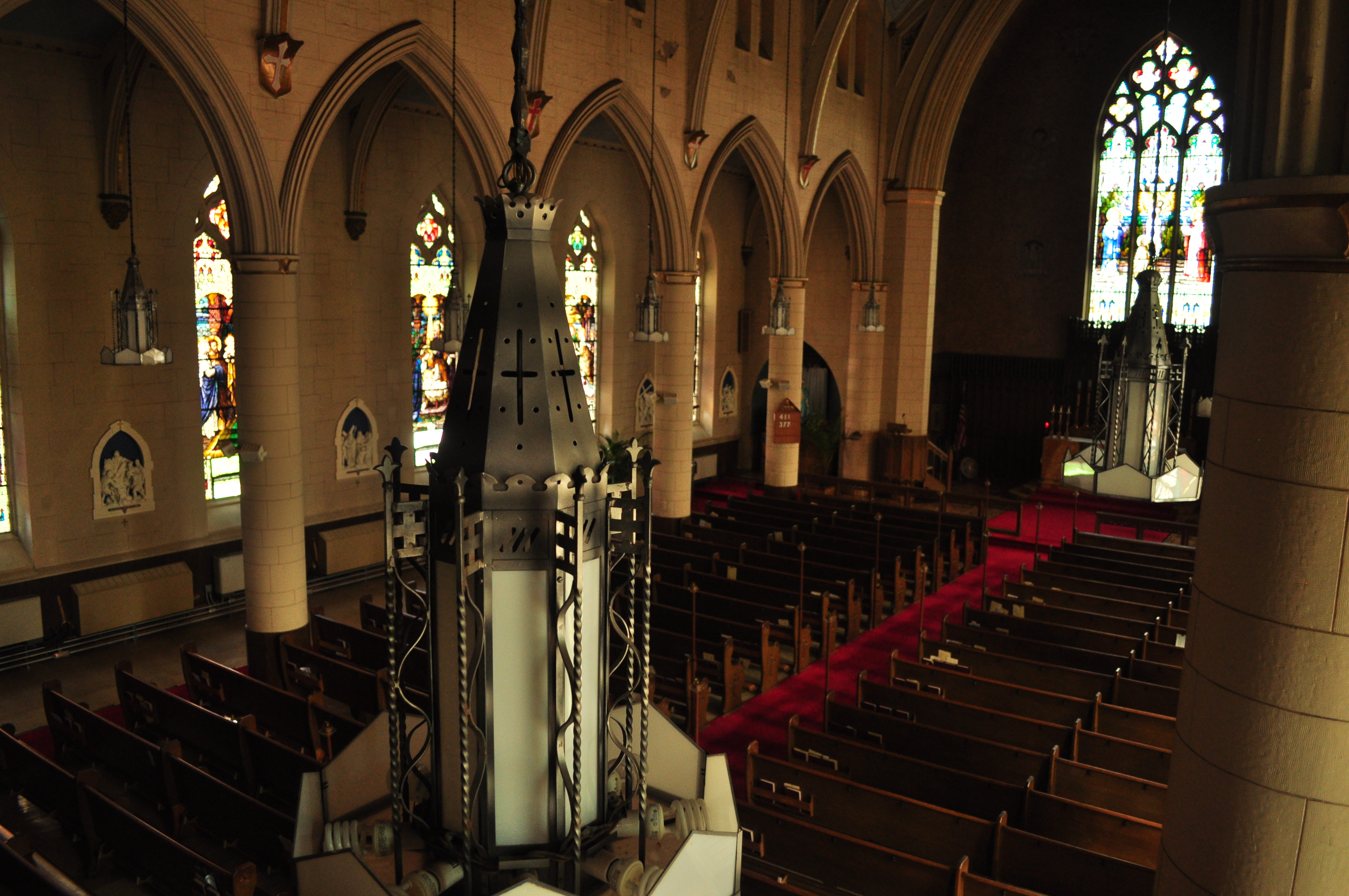
Interior of Saint John Church

The imposing 1843 Irish-influenced ecclesiastical Gothic Revival church building was designed by architect, Patrick Charles Keely and it was built by local Irish immigrants that were led by prominent local builder Barzialli Sage. The original church that was completed in 1843 was just a small church building and the existing spire for the church was erected in 1864. There have been three renovations to the exterior of the building. The 1843 building is now the sacristy for St. John's and the current church was finished in 1852. The church can hold up to one thousand worshipers. The interior walls of the church were frescoed by William Borgett, a local artist and there have been several interior renovations over the years.

The building is listed as significant contributing property of the City of Middletown Historic District.

=== St. Elizabeth Convent ===
During the construction of the church, it was decided that a convent was to be built. Saint Elizabeth Convent was finished in 1873. The convent was used as a Parish Center after the Sisters of Mercy vacated the property in the 1960s. In 2007, the former convent was demolished due to being in disrepair.

=== St. John parochial school ===
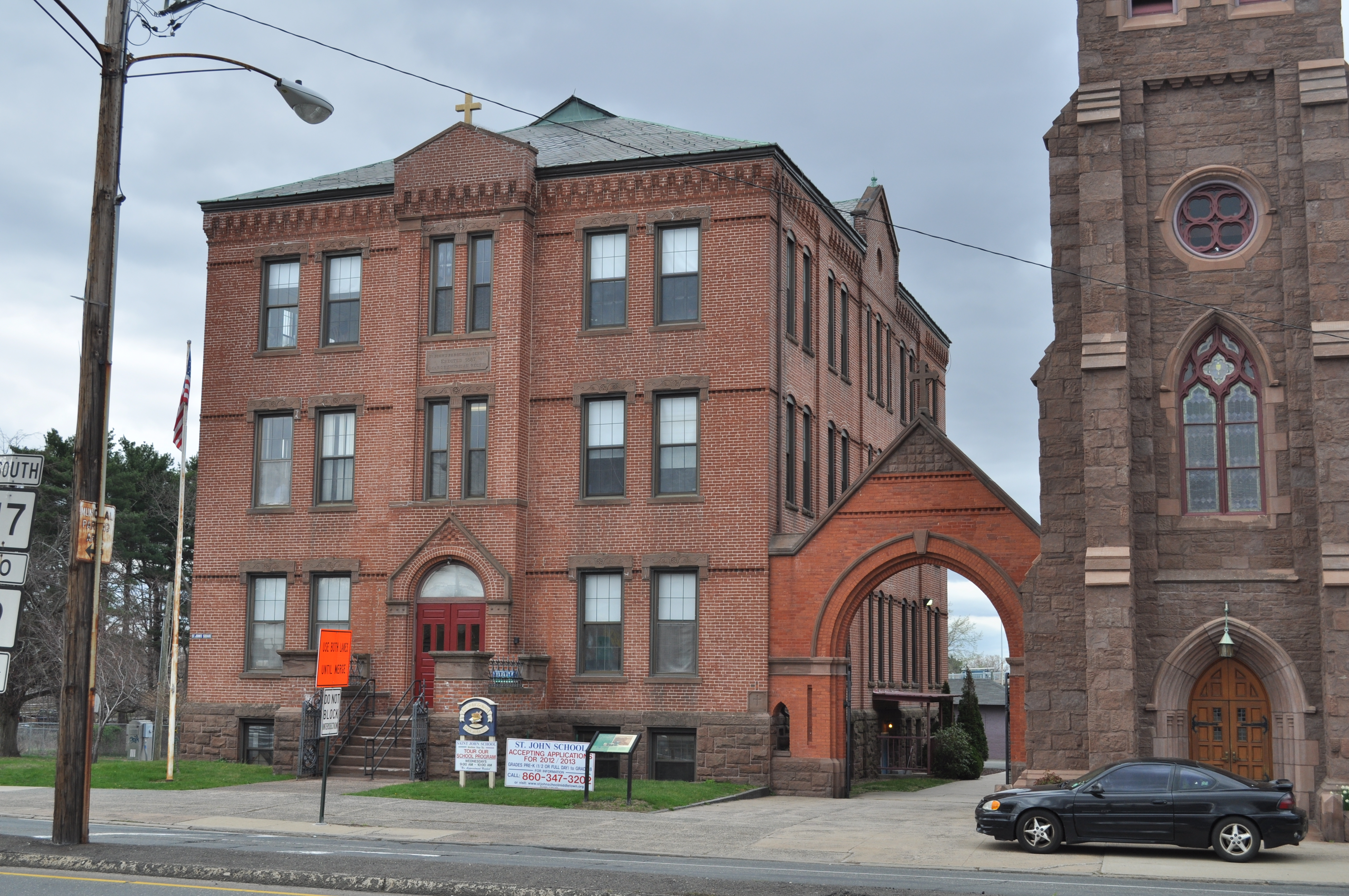
St. John School

Saint John Diocesan School was a Catholic parochial elementary school that was operational from 1888 until 2013. The school merged with the Saint Mary Diocesan School to form Saint Pope John Paul II Regional Diocesan School which still operates today serving students from pre-Kindergarten to 8th Grade.. In 2025, the church began the process of selling the former school building to PB Projects 18, LLC who will convert the old school building into apartments. The sale finalized in June 2026.

=== St. John graveyard and cemetery ===
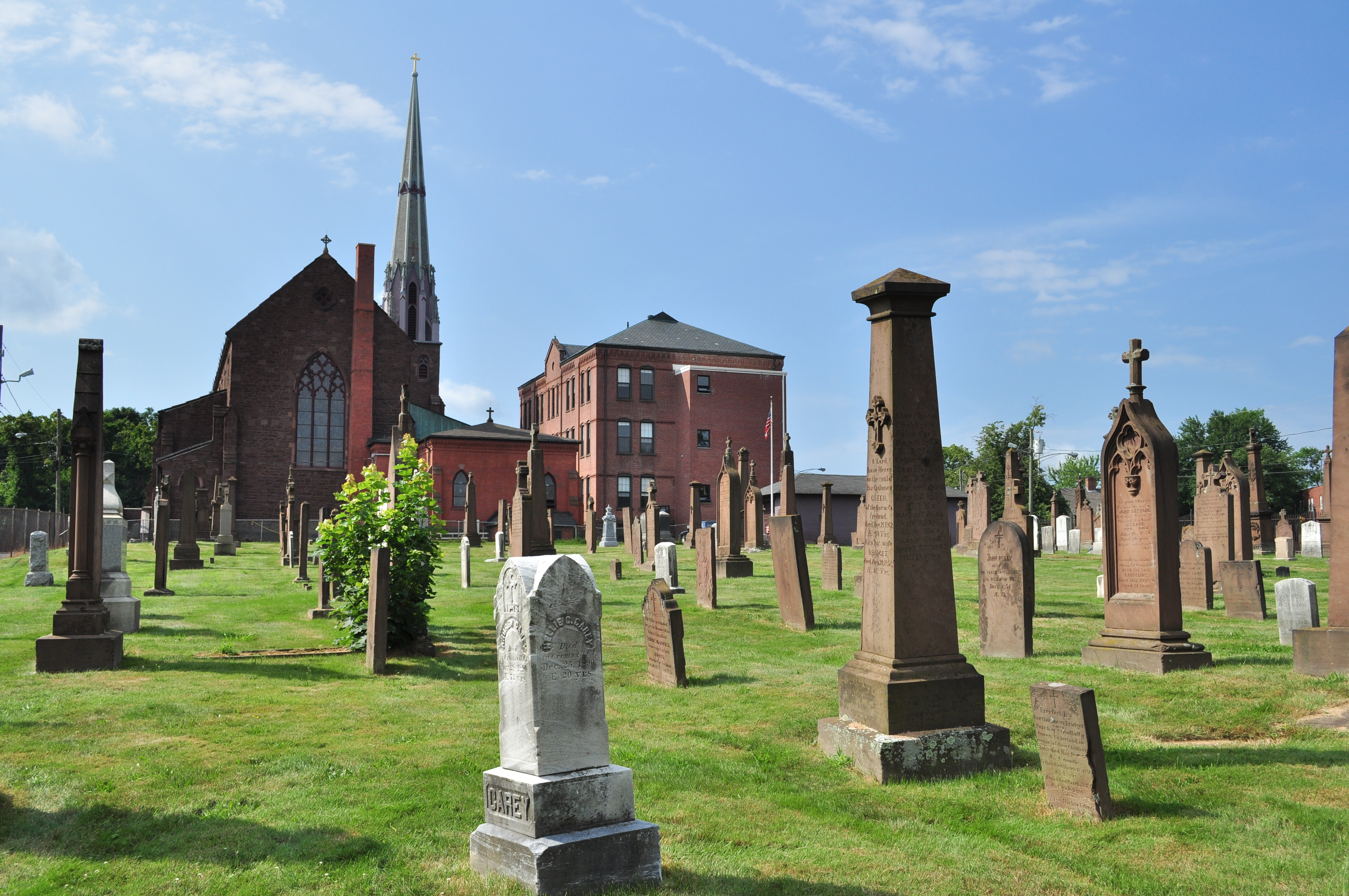
Old Saint John Graveyard

The church maintains two cemeteries. The original graveyard is located directly behind the church and the newer cemetery is located on Johnson Street in Middletown.

=== Yoked Parish ===
In 2017, the Bishop of Norwich yoked the Parishes of Saint Sebastian and Saint John which means that both parishes share a Priest. Daily Mass and Sunday Masses are held at both Parishes. The Parishes are still their own entities and are not merged into a combined Parish. In 2026, the yoked status ended with the appointment of a full-time pastor.

=== List of priests that served St. John Church as pastor/rector ===
1. John Brady, Sr. (1837-1845)
2. John Brady, Jr. (1845-1855)
3. Lawrence T.P. Mangan (1855-1857)
4. James Lynch (1857-1873)
5. Edward J. O'Brien (1873-1876)
6. Francis P. O'Keefe (1876-1881)
7. Denis Desmond (1881-1885)
8. Bernard O'Reilly Sheridan (1885-1903)
9. James Patrick Donovan (1903-1928)
10. Denis F. Baker (1928-1931)
11. William J. Fitzgerald (1931-1934)
12. John C. Brennan (1934-1944)
13. Bernard F. McCarthy (1944-1948)
14. John J. McGrath (1948-1961)
15. Edward J. McKenna (1962-1986)
16. Joseph C. Ashe (1986-2002)
17. Dennis G. Carey (2002-2004)
18. Anthony P. Gruber (2004-2005)
19. James J. Sucholet (2005-2009)
20. Michael L. Phillippino (2009-2017)
21. James Thaikoottathil (2017–2026)
22. Gregory P. Galvin
