= Chiesa di Montevergine, Noto =

Roman Catholic church in Sicily, Italy

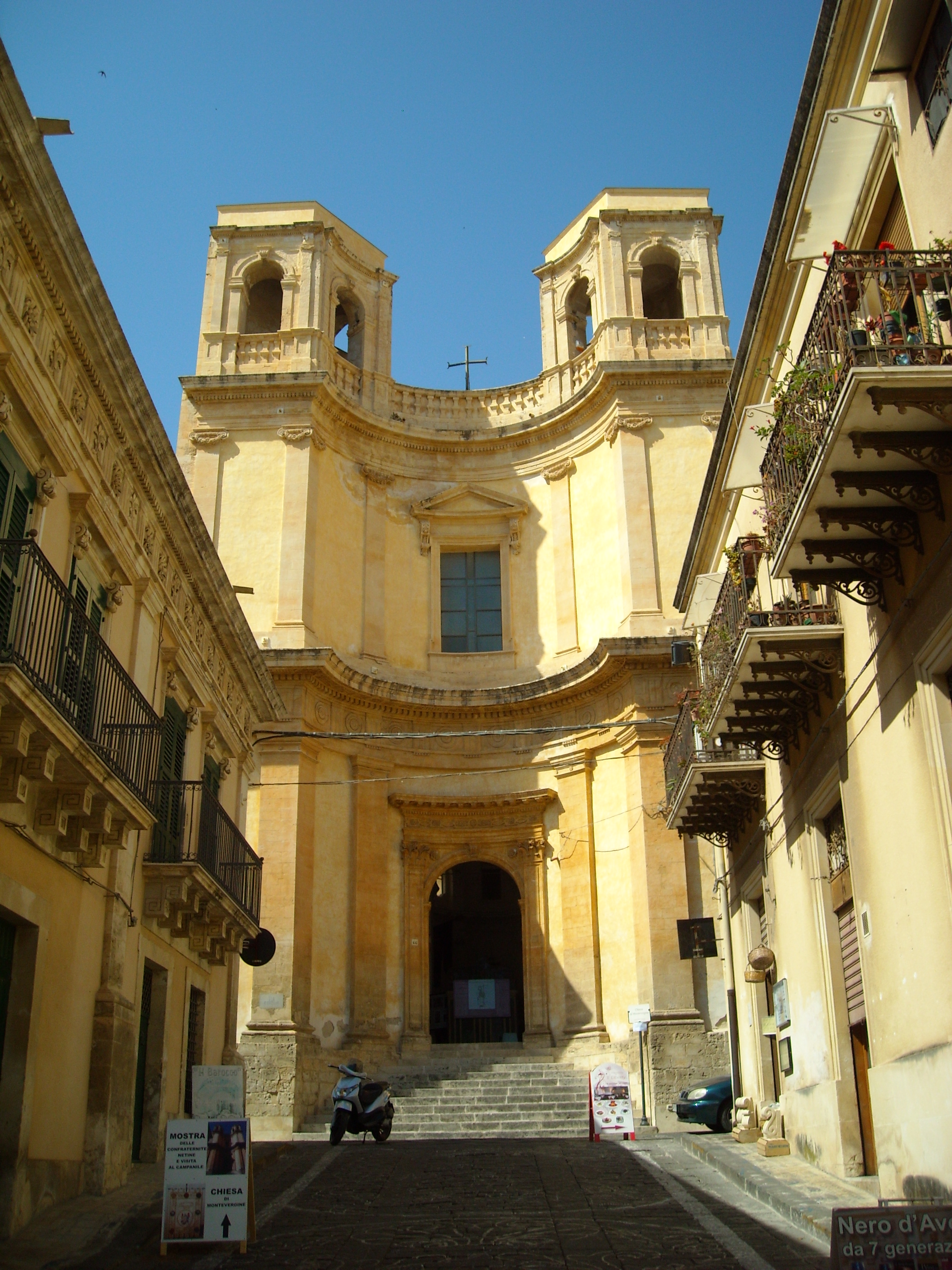
Chiesa di Montevergine, Noto

The Chiesa di Montevergine (Church of Montevergine), also known as San Girolamo, is a Baroque-style Roman Catholic church in Noto, region of Sicily, Italy.

Initial plans to build the church were made between 1695 and 1697, after the 1693 Sicily earthquake that leveled the town. It was built for the Benedictine nuns of the Order of Monte Vergine. The church is dedicated to St Jerome. It has a concave facade which is flanked by two bell-towers.

Most historians attribute the construction of the church to Vincenzo Sinatra. The construction of the church was completed in 1762.

The church rises at the top of stone steps, and the layout has a single nave flanked by Corinthian columns, and a rich stucco decoration. The interior has altarpieces by Constantino Carasi, including a Marriage of the Virgin and a Pieta.
