= San Paolo, Palazzolo Acreide =

Church in Sicily, Italy

Coordinates: 37.06480°N 14.90279°E

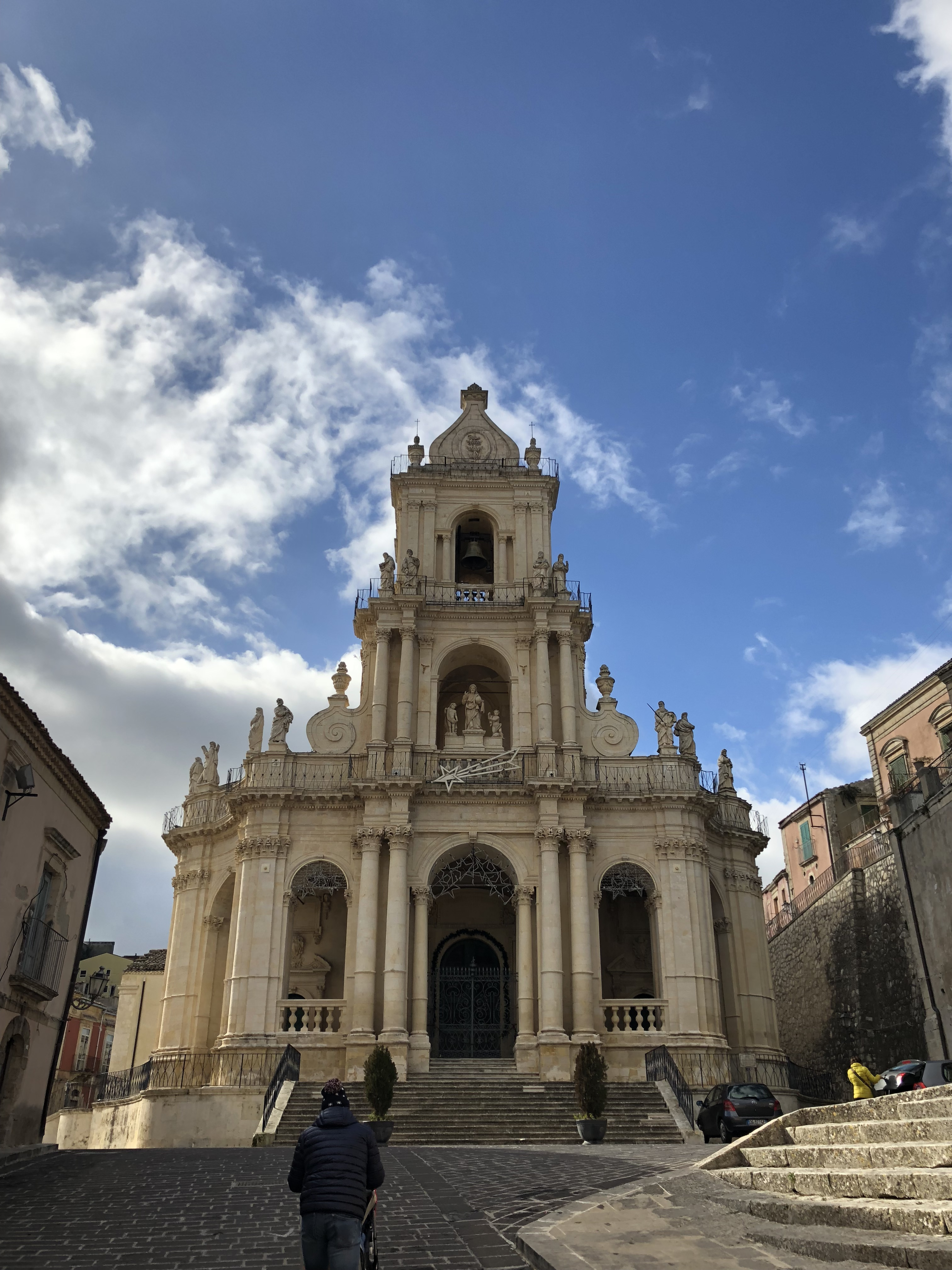
Facade of the church

San Paolo is a Roman Catholic basilica church located in the town of Palazzolo Acreide, in the region of Sicily, Italy.

== History and description ==
A small church dedicated to Santa Sofia, mother of Pope Gregory I (Saint Gregory the Great) was located on this site, but had been razed to erect a larger basilica church. This one in turn was razed by the 1693 Sicily earthquake, and a new Baroque church was erected between 1720 and 1730.

The facade, rich in detail, was designed by Vincenzo Sinatra. It has projecting corinthian columns, and atop these, in the third story, are statues of twelve apostles. The central arch above the portal has a statue of Christ blessing flanked by two cherubim. The facade harbors a portico or pronaos, which is approached through two scenic ramps of stairs. The portal has bronze reliefs depicting scenes from the life of St Paul. The central bell-tower has a peculiar onion dome, peculiar for Italian churches; it is flanked by doric pilasters. The central second story is linked to the flank with curling volutes.

Until the early 1900s, the facade, studded with six pairs of statues of the Apostles, was surmounted by a frieze, no longer existing today, which depicted a sword, symbol of the Apostle Paul, twisted by a snake, and inserted into the inside of a royal crown.

The interior of the basilica has three naves. A large organ is placed above the entrance portal. The main altar has a 16th-17th century crucifix. One of the paintings of the altar depicts the Conversion of St. Paul attributed to Giuseppe Crestadoro. He also painted over half a dozen of the lateral altarpieces. The statue of St Paul was sculpted by Vincenzo Lorefice in 1567. St Paul was chosen as patron of Palazzolo in September 1688.
