= San Sebastiano, Palazzolo Acreide =

Church building in Palazzolo Acreide, Italy

Coordinates: 37.06150°N 14.90434°E

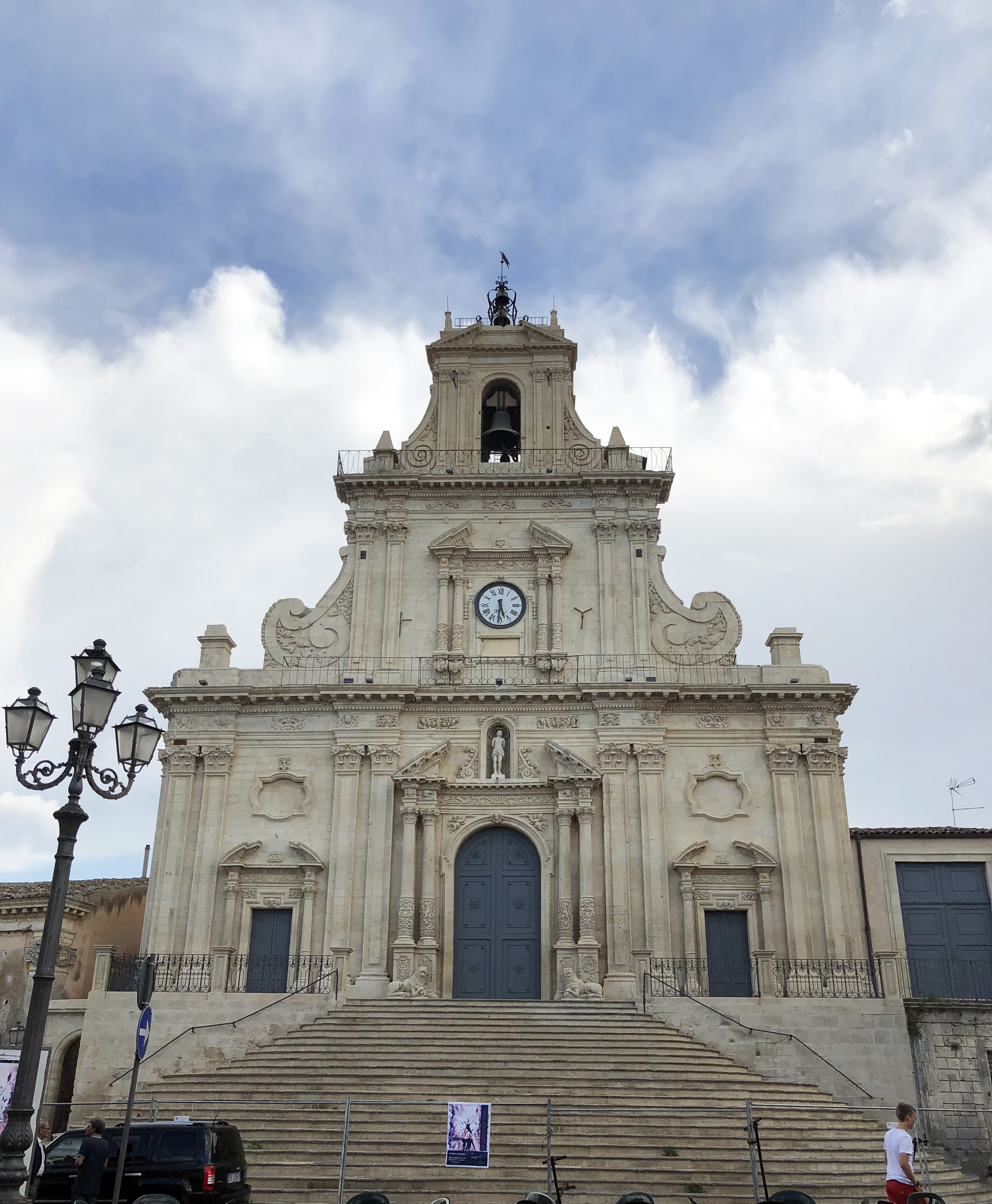
Facade of San Sebastiano

San Sebastiano is a Baroque style church in the town of Palazzolo Acreide, province of Siracusa, region of Sicily, Italy.

== History and description ==
A church at the site, also dedicated to St Sebastian, stood at the site since the 15th century, next to a smaller church dedicated to St Roch (San Rocco). It was enlarged in the 16th and 17th centuries but, like most of the edifices of Palazzolo, was destroyed in 1693 by a huge earthquake.

In the early 18th century a new edifice was built, with a nave and two aisles. The monumental façade was begun in 1723, designed by the Siracusan sculptor Mario Diamanti. It was completed, along with the campanile, in 1768.

The church is noteworthy for its fine Baroque decorations, including a wide use of stuccoes in the interior. The vault of the central nave has three large 19th-century frescoes, while the altars are decorated with polychrome marbles, with altarpieces or statues portraying saints. The central nave ends with an apse including the St Crucifix Chapel and a majestic marble high altar, with a 17th-century crucifix.

Other artworks include the titular saint's statue (by an unknown artist, 1663), a statue of the Madonna, the organ (1728-29) and a painting of St. Marguerite (1758) by Olivio Sozzi.
