= St. Sebastian's Church, Udayamperoor =

Coordinates: 9.88264°N 76.37609°E

St. Sebastian's Church, Udayamperoor, is a Christian church in Kerala, India.

It is part of the Syro-Malabar Catholic Archdiocese of Ernakulam-Angamaly (Syro-Malabar Catholic Church), and is situated 8 kilometers (5.0 mi) south of Thripunithura, a historical and traditional place in Ernakulam District, Kerala state, South India and 2 1/2 miles (4.0 km) north of Poothotta, the border of Ernakulam and Kottayam districts, near Vembanad lake. Udayamperoor is a historically significant place, where the Synod of Diamper in 1599 held at All Saints Church, Udayamperoor (Old) is very near to this church.

The feast of Jesus, Mary and St. John the Baptist and St. Sebastian is celebrated every year on the first Sunday after the feast of Dhanaha (January 6). The Parish has the history of service in the field of education. An English Medium School started here in 2002 instead of Malayalam medium unaided school for the need of the people.

== History ==
A Christian community called ‘Nazranis’ (the disciples of Jesus of Nazareth) was formed at Kodungaloor. A group of 72 families from Syria and Mesopotamia under the leadership of Knanayi Thoma, a disciple of Thomas the Apostle, migrated to Kodungaloor in 345 AD. Later they moved to different parts of Kerala like Udayamperoor, Kottayam, etc. St. Sebastian's Church was established in 1893, by a group of parishioners under the leadership of Fr. Yohannan Manickanamparambil. The parishioners separated themselves from St. John the Baptist Church, South Parur established in 802 AD.

In the beginning, the sacraments were administered in a school hall and later a new church was built here with the cooperation of the parishioners. Many renovations took place in different periods. The centenary was celebrated in 1993. A new church was built and consecrated on 6 January 2005 by Mar Thomas Chakkiath (Auxiliary bishop of Ernakulam-Angamaly). The relics of St. Sebastian, the martyr and Patron Saint of the parish, were brought from Rome by Mar Sebastian Adayantharath (Auxiliary bishop of Ernakulam- Angamaly).

== 21st century ==
In 2024, the vicar is Rev. Fr. Varghese Mampilly. The church has over 1800 members.
