= St. Sebastian Church (Middletown, Connecticut) =

Historic church in Connecticut, United States

Coordinates: 41°33′41.12″N 72°39′12.52″W

Saint Sebastian Church
- Saint Sebastian's Roman Catholic Church
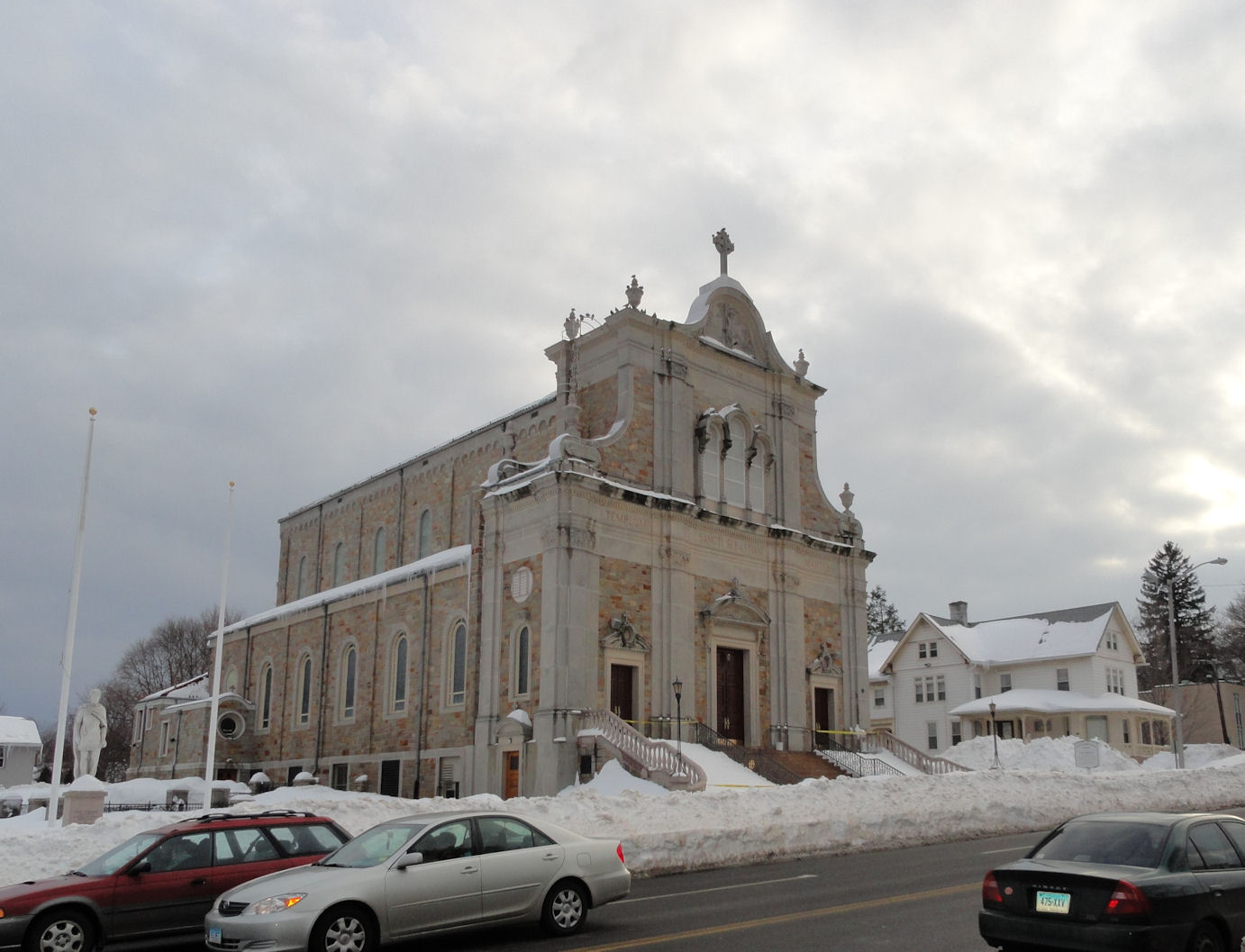
- St. Sebastian Church, January 2011
- Saint Sebastian Church
- Location: 155 Washington Street; Middletown, Connecticut
- Country: United States
- Denomination: Roman Catholic

History
- Founder: Middletown Italian Immigrants
- Dedication: Saint Sebastian
- Dedicated: December 06, 1931

Architecture
- Architect: Raymond C. Gorrani

Administration
- Province: Hartford
- Diocese: Norwich
- Deanery: Middletown
- Parish: Saint Sebastian

Clergy
- Bishop: Richard Francis Reidy
- Pastor(s): Rev. James Thaikoottathil, J.C.D.
- St. Sebastian Roman Catholic Church
- U.S. Historic district – Contributing property
- Location within Connecticut
- Built: 1931
- Architect: Raymond C. Gorrani
- Architectural style: Renaissance Revival
- Part of: Washington Street Historic District (Middletown, CT) (ID85001018)
- Designated CP: May 9, 1985

Saint Sebastian is a Roman Catholic church in Middletown, Connecticut, part of the Diocese of Norwich.

== History ==
In the early 20th Century, immigrants from the Sicilian town of Melilli moved in large numbers to Middletown. By 1920 there were enough families there to form a vibrant and close-knit Italian community that desired its own place of worship. Through a massive fundraising effort, the donation of materials, and the labor of masons, plasterers and stone carvers, the Italian community realized the dream of its own church, a significant local cultural symbol and the only Italian national parish in the Diocese of Norwich.

== Building ==
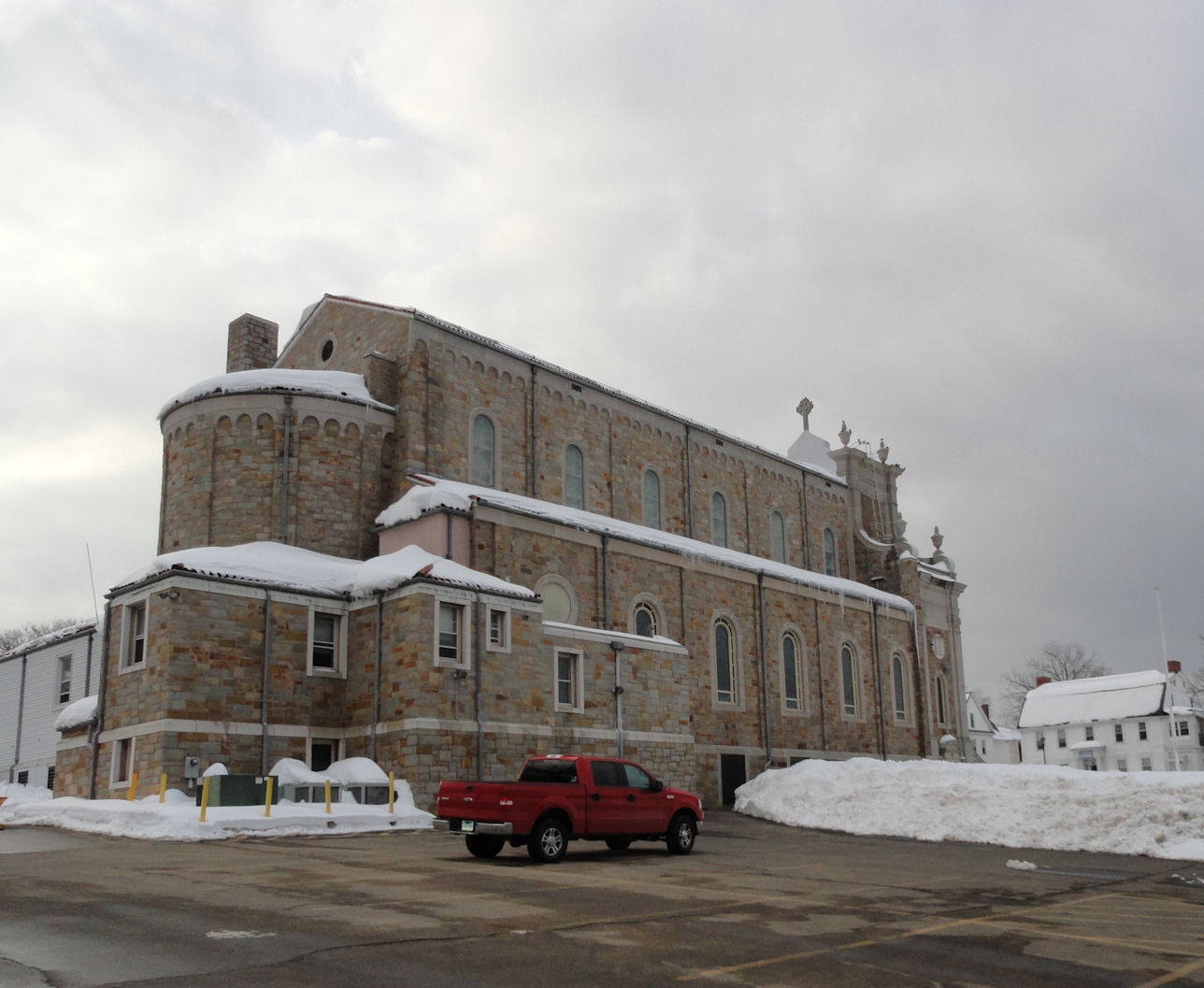
St. Sebastian Church, Middletown Connecticut as seen from behind

The imposing 1931 Italian influenced Renaissance Revival church building was designed by architect Raymond C. Gorrani of Worcester, Massachusetts. Gorrani had designed the very similar Church of Our Lady of Mt. Carmel in Worcester a few years earlier and, according to a recent history of St. Sebastian, members of the parish actually traveled to Worcester to inspect Mt. Carmel Church before employing Gorrani. In keeping with the desire of his clients, Gorrani's finished design is heavily influenced by the design of the Basilica of St. Sebastian in Melilli.

In December 1931, shortly after construction on the church had begun, Fr. Rocco Guerriero was appointed the first resident pastor of St. Sebastian Church. Very shortly thereafter Fr. Guerriero appointed his brother, Daniel A. Guerriero as the supervising architect to oversee the completion of Gorrani's design. Little is known about Raymond Gorrani but it is known that after St. Sebastian, which was built while the architect was also designing a church for St. Ann Parish in Marlboro, Massachusetts, he had no additional commissions.

The building is listed as a significant contributing property of the City of Middletown Historic District.

== Music ==
The Church's Organ is an Austin Organs, Inc. Opus 1828 that has 2 manuals and 15 ranks. The Church also has an Adult Choir and Children's Choir.

== St. Sebastian Feast ==
The beloved Feast of St. Sebastian was first celebrated in Middletown in the early 20th century. Proceeds from the feast's early years helped finance the building of the church. Held annually, the three-day festival features a parade through Middletown's streets, carrying the statue of the patron saint.

== Yoked Parish ==
The Parishes of St. Sebastian and St. John share a Priest since 2017, so Daily Mass and Sunday Masses are held at both Parishes. The Parishes are still their own entities and are not merged as a combined parish.

== Priests that served St. Sebastian Parish ==
1. Rev. Rocco Joseph Guerriero (1931-1936)
2. Rev. John James Keane (1936-1952)
3. Rev. Richard David Curtin (1952- 1962)
4. Rev. Paul J. Rivard (1962-1965)
5. Rev. Maurice F. Sullivan (1965-1969)
6. Rev. Zenon Algrid Smilga (1969-1980)
7. Rev. Salvatore Bentivegna, O.S.J. (1980-1990)
8. Rev. Joseph Sibliano, O.S.J. (1990-1998)
9. Rev. Daniel Schwebs, O.S.J. (1998-2001)
10. Rev. Thomas J. Smith (2001-2004)
11. Rev. Augustine Naduvilekoot (2004-2007)
12. Rev. James Thaikoottathil, J.C.D. (2007–Present)

- St. Sebastian Roman Catholic Church
- U.S. Historic district – Contributing property
- Location within Connecticut
- Location: 155 Washington Street; Middletown, Connecticut
- Built: 1921
- Architect: Raymond C. Gorrani
- Architectural style: Renaissance Gothic
- Part of: Main Street Historic District (Middletown, CT) (ID83001275)
- Designated CP: June 3, 1983
