= Vincenzo Sinatra =

Sicilian architect

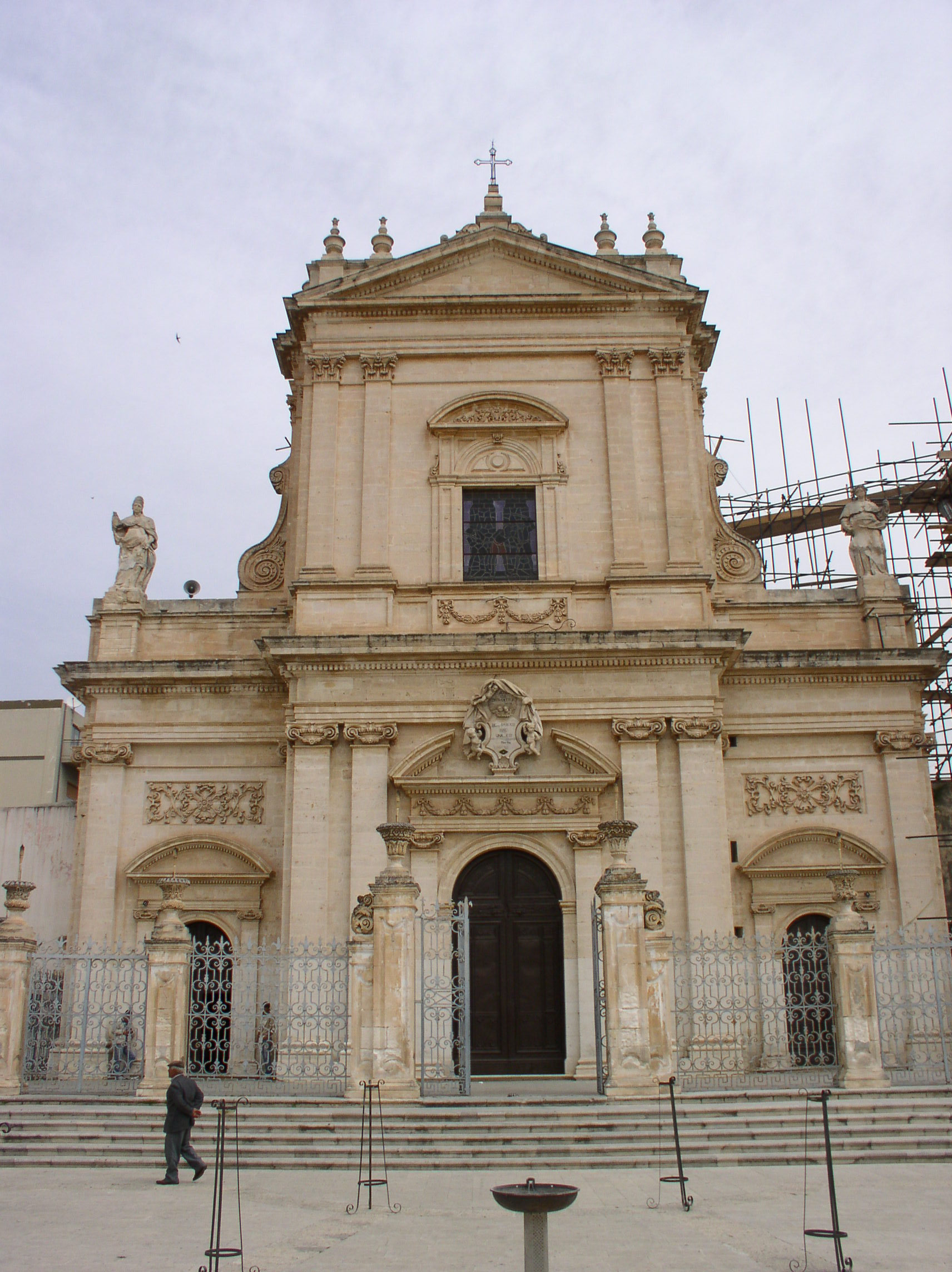
- Basilica di Santa Maria Maggiore, Ipsica
- Born: 1707; Noto, Kingdom of Sicily
- Died: 26 August 1765 (aged 57–58); Noto, Kingdom of Sicily
- Occupation: Architect
- Movement: Baroque; Neoclassicism

Vincenzo Sinatra (1707 – 26 August 1782) was a Sicilian architect. He was a pupil of Rosario Gagliardi. Sinatra worked in both the Baroque style and later in Neo-Classical style. He was active in Noto until 1767, working on the reconstruction of the city after the earthquake of 1693. His works in the city included the Church of Montevergine, the Church of San Giovanni Battista and the Basilica di Santa Maria Maggiore and its Loggiato in Ispica. One of his most notable works was the ground floor of Palazzo Ducezio (now the town hall known as the Municipio) which was begun in 1746; an upper floor was added in similar style in the early 20th century. He also designed the church of San Paolo, Palazzolo Acreide.

== Biography ==
Following the 1693 earthquake, the city of Noto was completely rebuilt on a new site. Sinatra was responsible for many of the new buildings in the new city. Around 1730 he worked as a stone-cutter in the construction of the monastery of Santa Maria dell’Arco with his uncle by marriage Rosario Gagliardi. Sinatra’s career and artistic development must have been greatly influenced by his association with Gagliardi. They collaborated until 1762, when the master named him as his agent and successor.

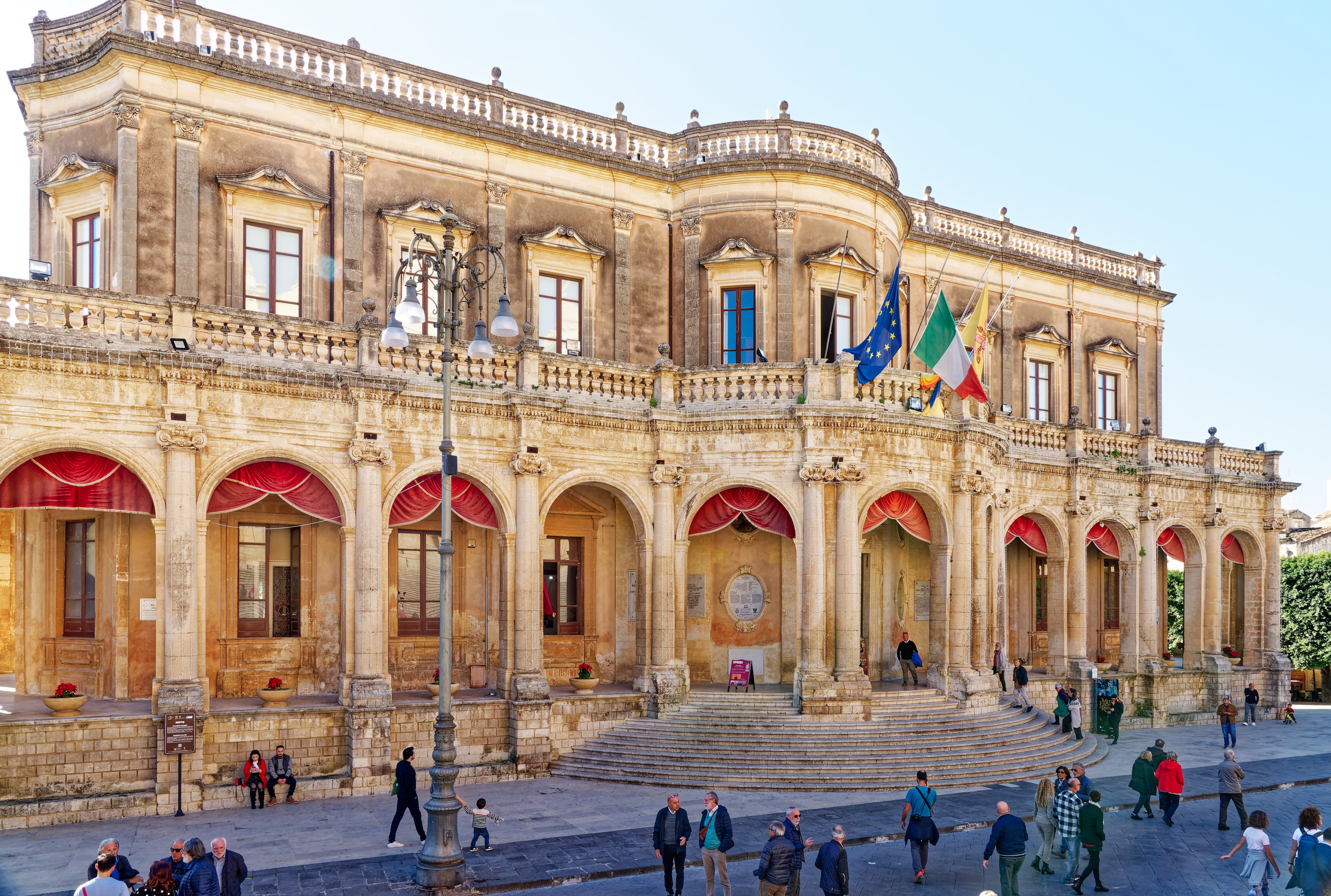
Palazzo Ducezio, Noto; the ground floor is by Vincenzo Sinatra

Sinatra is best known for his work on the Palazzo Ducezio (now the Municipio) at Noto, on which he was employed for more than ten years (from 1742). While he is the only architect mentioned in relevant documents, it is not known whether he was responsible for the original design, which was clearly inspired by French models. A portico runs round the palazzo on three sides, each pier faced with an Ionic column, above which the entablature breaks forward. At the corners an arched bay is set at an angle and curved inwards. The palazzo was originally conceived as a single-storey structure crowned with a dome: the present upper floor was added at the end of the 19th century and completed in 1950.

Sinatra worked on many projects in the city and elsewhere in the Val di Noto. Some scholars have attributed to Sinatra the church of San Paolo (c. 1750) at Palazzolo Acrèide, which has a portico similar to that of the Palazzo Ducezio. The church of Montevergine (c. 1762), Noto, is generally agreed to be by him; the central bay of the façade is dished inwards, the curves continuing into the side walls of the flanking towers in a manner reminiscent of Johann Bernhard Fischer von Erlach’s Holy Trinity Church (1694–1702) in Salzburg.

Sinatra’s personal architectural style is difficult to assess, owing to a lack of reliable information. He is mentioned in numerous documents, but often in conjunction with Gagliardi and the other prominent Noto architect, Paolo Labisi; evidently most of his work was carried out in collaboration with others. The buildings with which his name is most closely linked show the influence of Gagliardi’s late Sicilian Baroque style, but they also exhibit Neoclassical tendencies, albeit with some Rococo ornamentation.

== Gallery ==
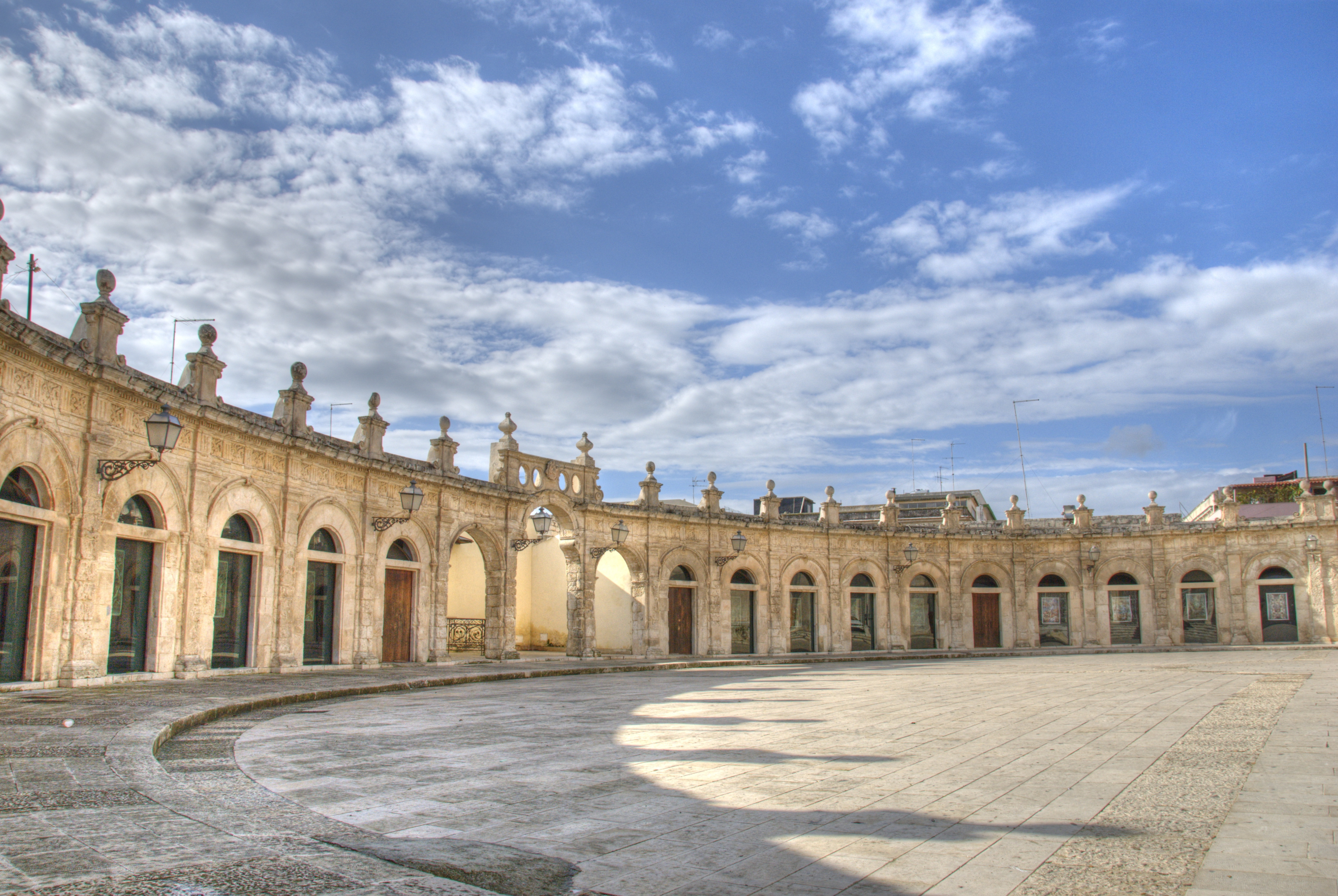
The "Loggiato" in Santa Maria Maggiore in Ispica

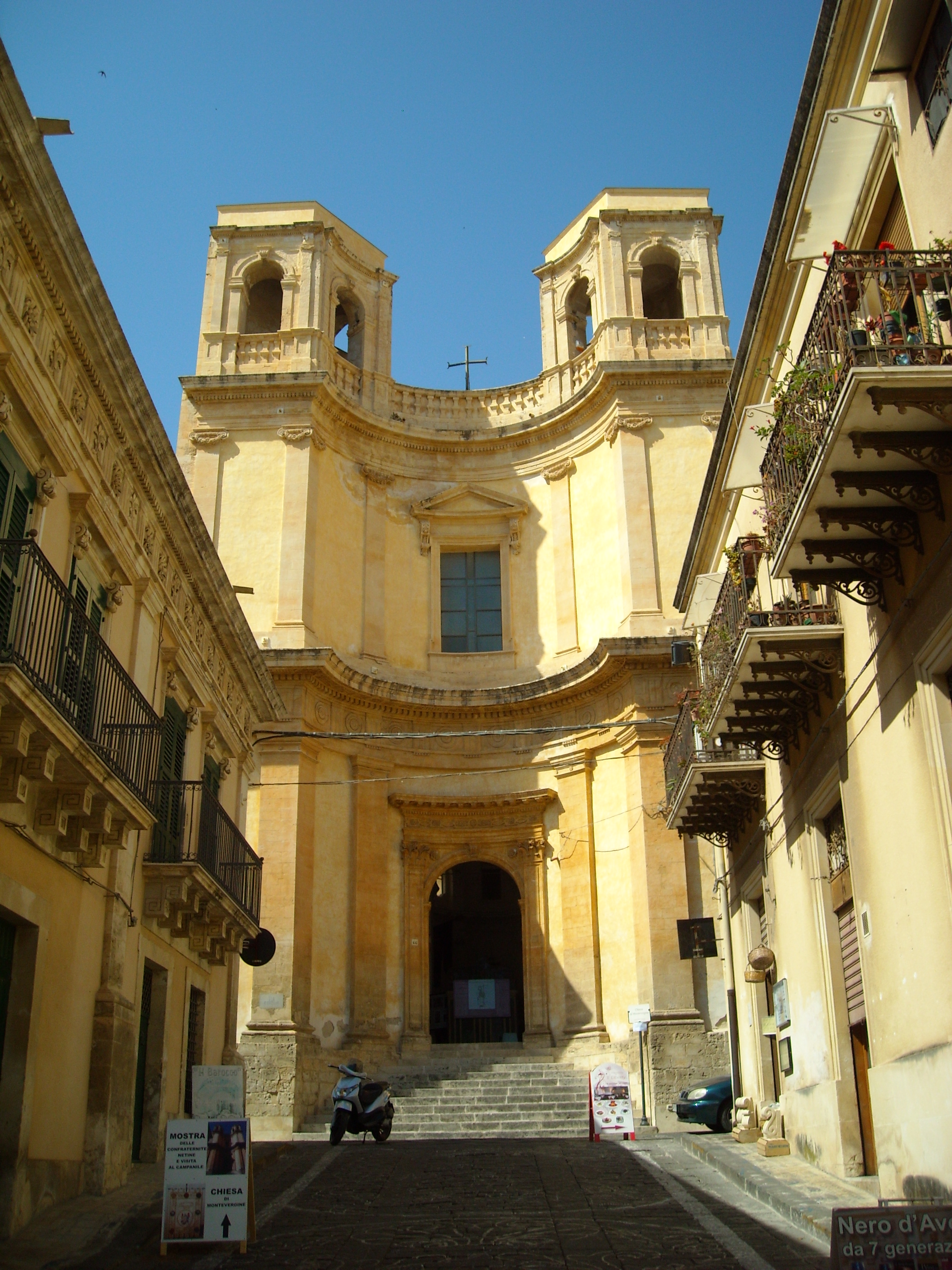
Church of Montevergine

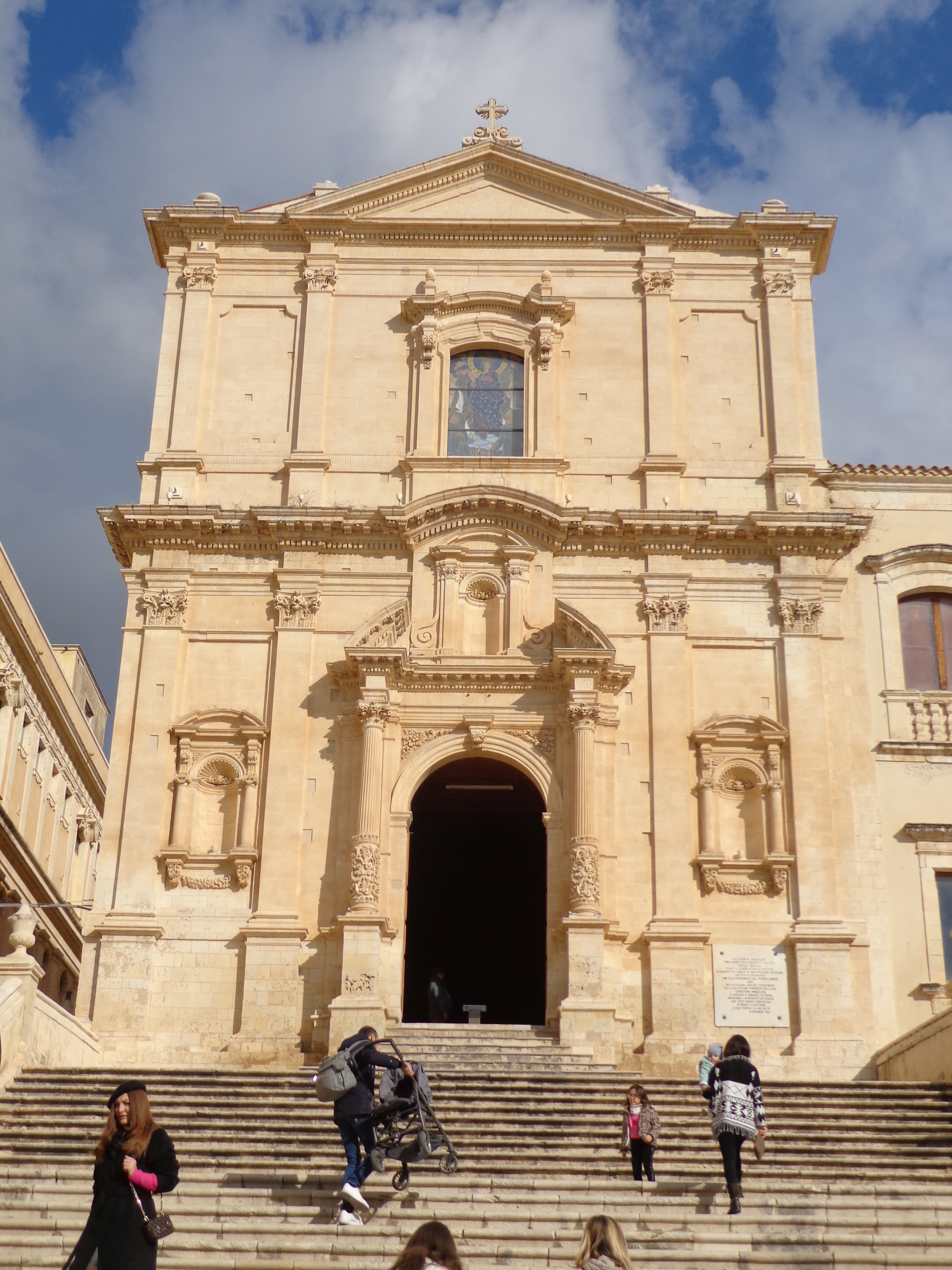
Church of San Francesco, Noto

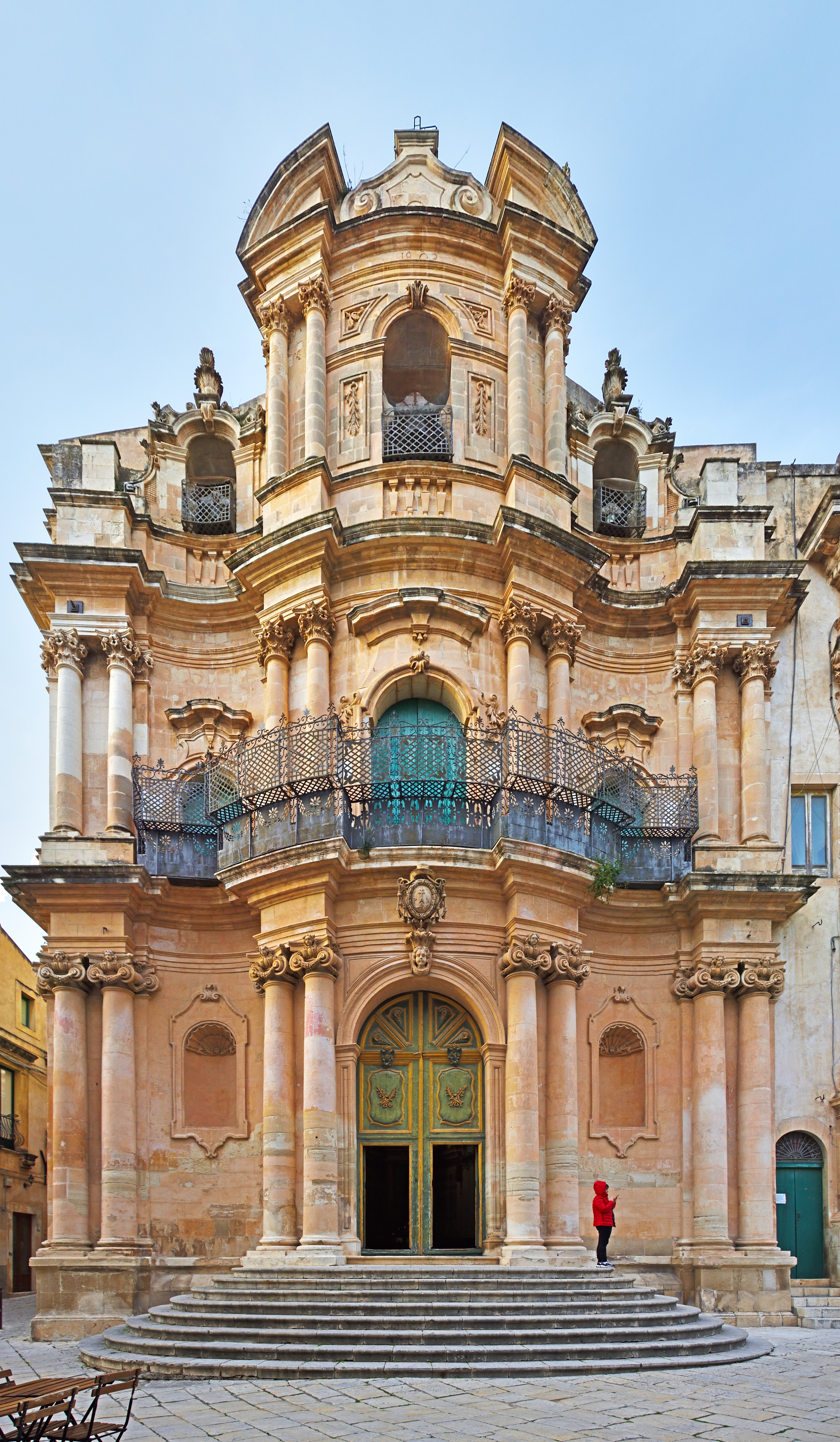
Church of St. John Evangelist, Scicli

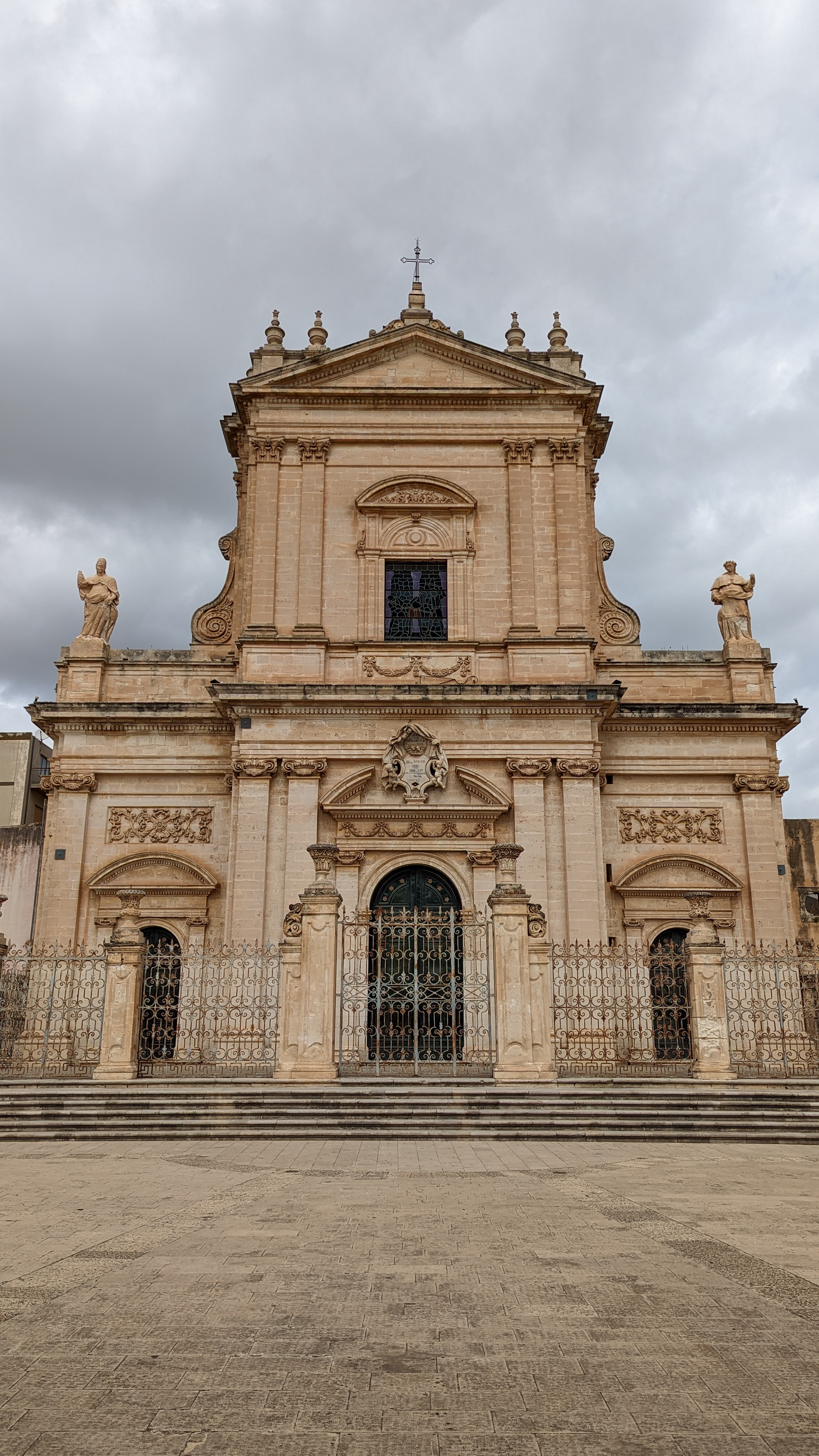
Façade of Santa Maria Maggiore

== Bibliography ==
- Pisani, Nicolò (1950). Noto: Barocco e opera d’arte. Syracuse. p. 81.
- Canale, Cleofe Giovanni (1976). Noto: La struttura continua della città tardo-barocca. Palermo: Flaccovio.
- Tobriner, Stephen (1982). The Genesis of Noto. London: University of California Press. ISBN 978-0520035263.
