= St. Sebastian's Church, Wellaweediya =

Roman Catholic church in Negombo, Sri Lanka

Coordinates: 7.219°N 79.839°E

St. Sebastian’s Church, Negombo
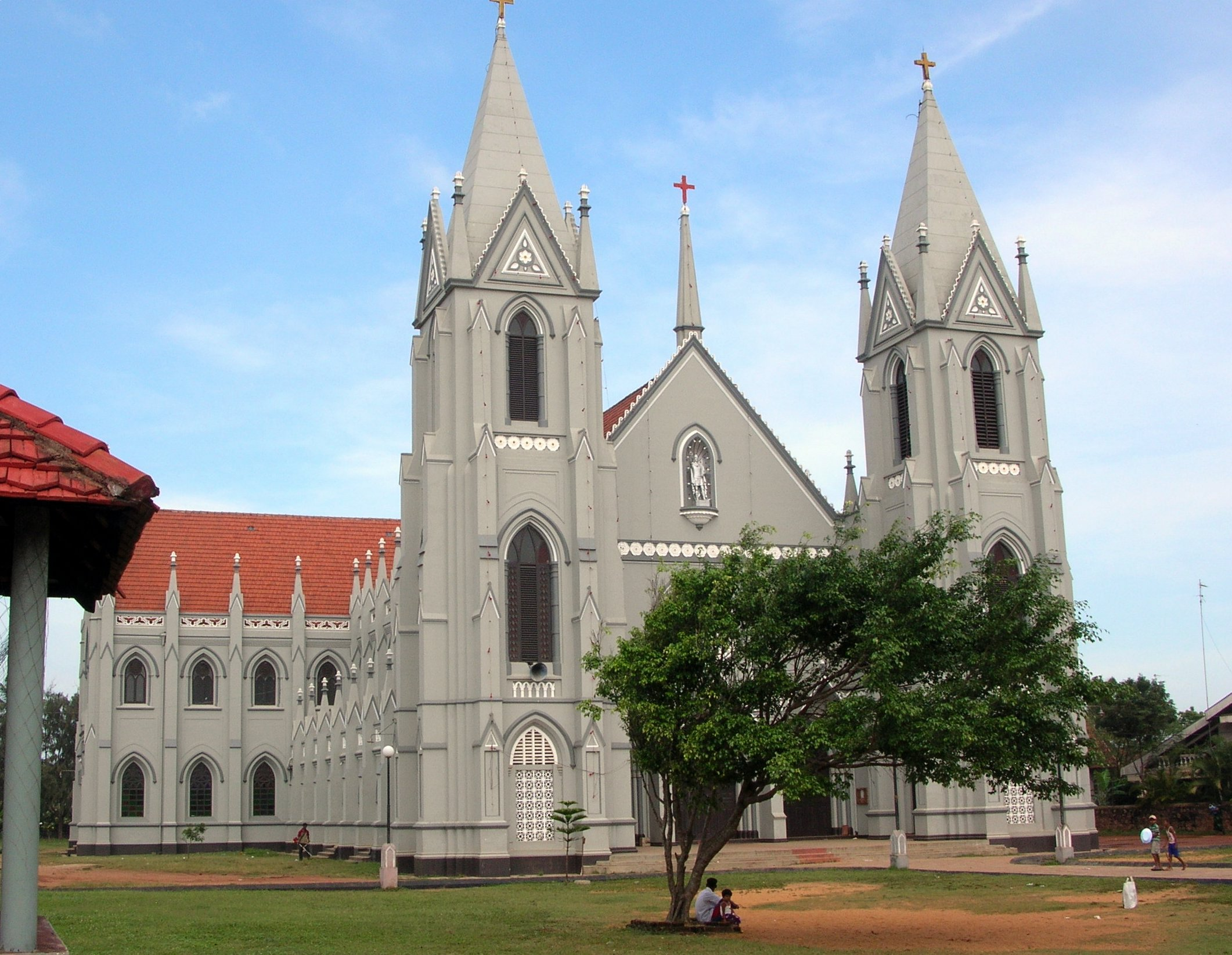

Religion
- Affiliation: Roman Catholic
- Rite: Latin Rite

Location
- Location: Negombo, Sri Lanka
- Interactive map of St. Sebastian’s Church, Negombo

Architecture
- Architect: Fr. G. Gannon
- Type: Church
- Style: Gothic Revival
- Groundbreaking: 2 February 1936
- Completed: 1946

The St. Sebastian's Church, Negombo, also known as St. Sebastian's Church, Wellaweediya, is a Roman Catholic church in Negombo, in Sri Lanka. It is architecturally based on the Reims Cathedral in France and is built in Gothic Revival style. Saint Sebastian is the patron saint of the city of Negombo.

== Location ==
The church is located in Sea Street in Negombo, Sri Lanka.

== History ==
The church was designed by Father G. Gannon, parish priest of Sea Street. Although the foundation stone was laid by the Archbishop of Colombo, Pierre-Guillaume Marque, on 2 February 1936, construction was not completed until ten years later. It replaced a smaller church to accommodate the increasing number of parishioners in the majority catholic city. It is said to be modeled in Gothic Revival style on the lines of the Reims Cathedral in France. A shadow of this church is seen in the Negombo Lagoon.

This church is one of the many churches in Sri Lanka dedicated to St Sebastian, who is considered a martyr in the Catholic Church history. His veneration is particularly celebrated seeking relief from epidemics. A festival called the "Feast of St Sebastian" is held every year here during the month of January. A tali drama narrating the life of Saint Sebastian used to be enacted here before 1950. Now, "Raja Tunkattuwa", a Sinhalese language drama about the Three Kings is held here during Christmas.

== Festival ==
At the St. Sebastian Church an annual festival dedicated to St. Sebastian is held on the last Sunday of the month of January. On this occasion a decorated flagstaff is affixed at the church premises before two weeks and food is served free to poor people. Also the whole village is decorated with colourful lights. On the feast day a beautiful procession carrying the statue of St.Sebastian is travelled around the village in a grandeur manner.

== Bibliography ==
- Anandappa, J. B. Clinton (1990). The Catholic directory of Sri Lanka, 1989/90. J.B.C. Anandappa.
- Frey, Elke; Lemmer, Gerhard; Namasivayam, Jayanthi (2001). Sri Lanka. Nelles. ISBN 978-3-88618-229-9.
