= Rosario Gagliardi =

Italian architect (1698–1762)

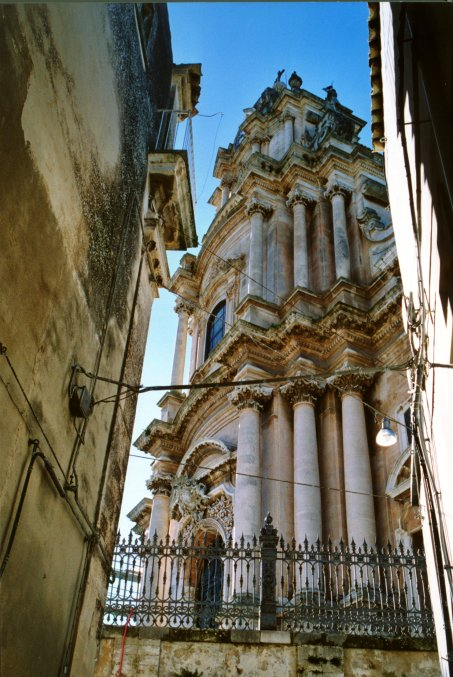
- Church of San Giorgio, Ragusa. Designed in 1738 by Rosario Gagliardi, it is approached by huge staircase of some 250 steps
- Born: 1698; Sarausa, Kingdom of Sicily
- Died: 1762 (aged 63–64); Noto, Kingdom of Sicily
- Occupation: Architect
- Movement: Sicilian Baroque

Rosario Gagliardi (1698 – 1762) was an Italian architect born in Syracuse. He was one of the leading architects working in the Sicilian Baroque. He worked mostly in the Sicilian Baroque beginning with the cathedral at Modica in 1702.

== Works ==
He was already living in Noto in 1708 and remained there for most of his life.

The old town on Monte Alveria, 7 km to the north-west, had been destroyed by the 1693 Sicily earthquake, and Gagliardi’s career was mostly spent in the construction of the new town. In 1713 he began work on plans for Santa Maria dell’Arco, in which he showed a traditionalist tendency. By then he had already acquired the title of Magister, and he reached the status of architetto in 1726. He was later appointed municipal architect, a greatly coveted position involving special commissions from the municipality. He also seems to have collaborated on the planning, construction and supervision of the most important religious buildings in Noto. Gagliardi was also responsible for numerous palazzi in Noto and other places on the island.

As well as Santa Maria dell’Arco, the churches of Santa Chiara (1748), San Domenico (1727; façade 1732–6) and Santissimo Crocefisso are now known to be his work, while others are attributed to him (San Carlo, San Nicolò, Santissimo Salvatore).

As ‘architect of the city of Noto and its valley’, Gagliardi also worked in Syracuse, Modica, and Ragusa.

He also worked in Caltagirone and Comiso.

An excellent example of his spatial inventiveness can be seen in the plan for San Giorgio (1744), Ragusa Ibla, where he revealed his mastery of façade design with a campanile in the Sicilian style. His use of this element, together with his strong interest in the scenic setting of his buildings, was something he shared with other architects working in 18th-century Europe. That model, with its transformation of the central part of the campanile into a tower, had a widespread influence on the buildings constructed in the Val di Noto; in Gagliardi’s own work the Austrian-style central tower may be seen again at Noto Cathedral and at San Giorgio (1738), Modica. In 1762, by then in poor health, Gagliardi appointed his nephew Vincenzo Sinatra, already his collaborator, as his proxy and successor. After that date Gagliardi’s name disappears from all documents, so that 1762 is thought to be the year of his death.

Recent research has revealed Gagliardi to have had a considerable influence on his contemporaries in Noto. His work shows the strong imprint of the Italian Baroque tradition, mediated by his knowledge of basic Renaissance concepts and his familiarity with the treatise literature.

== Gallery ==
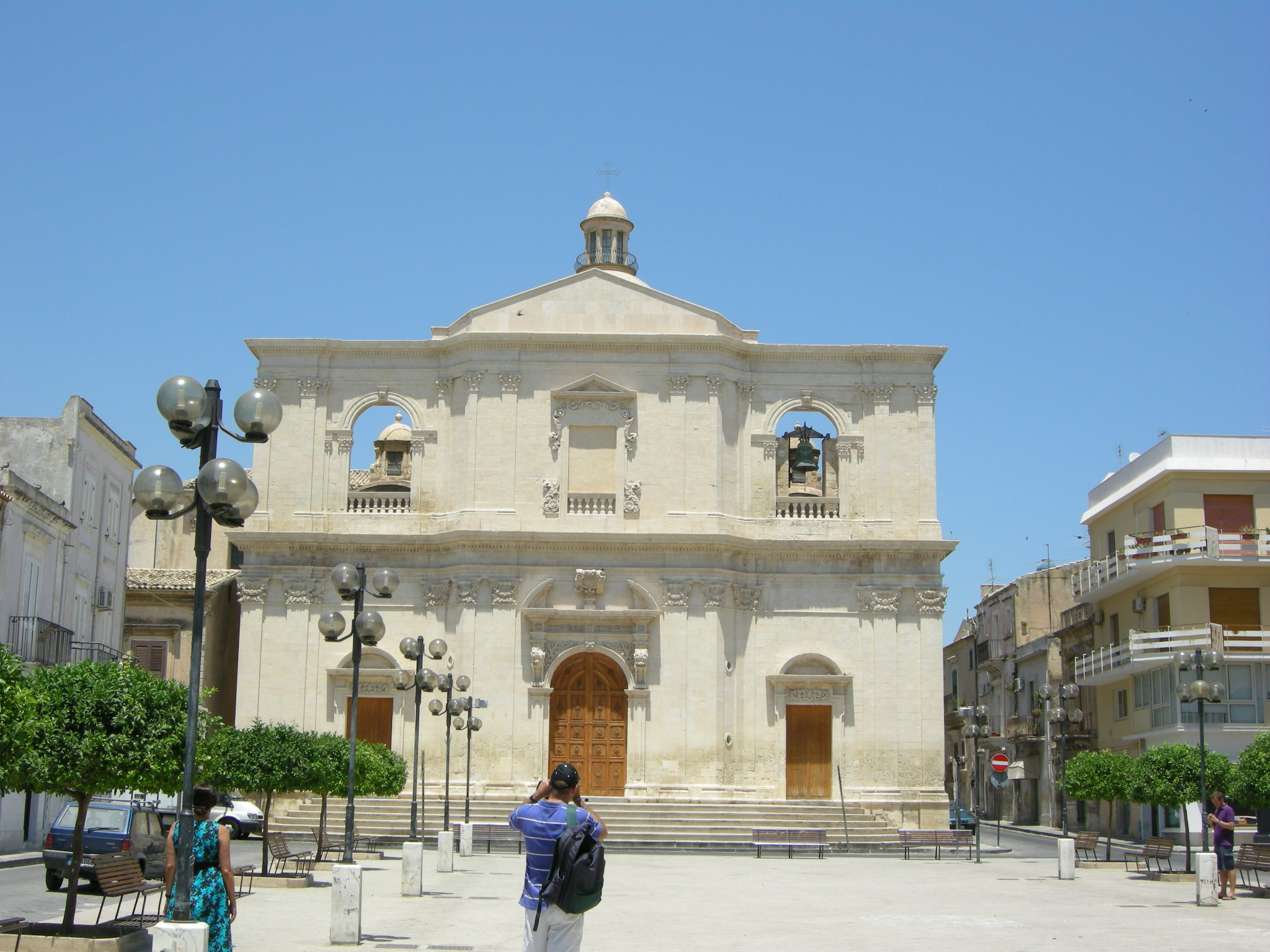
Santissimo Crocefisso, Noto

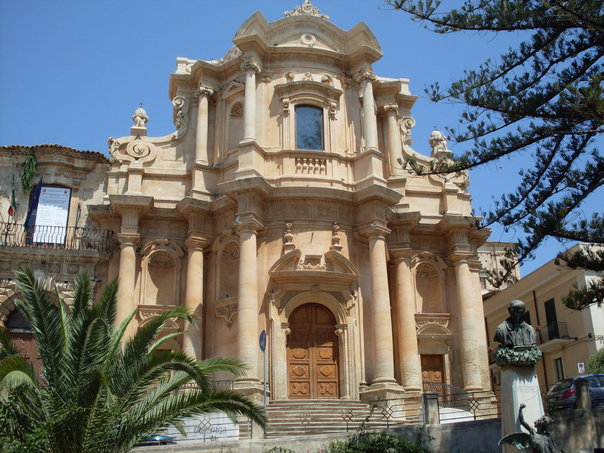
Church of San Domenico, Noto

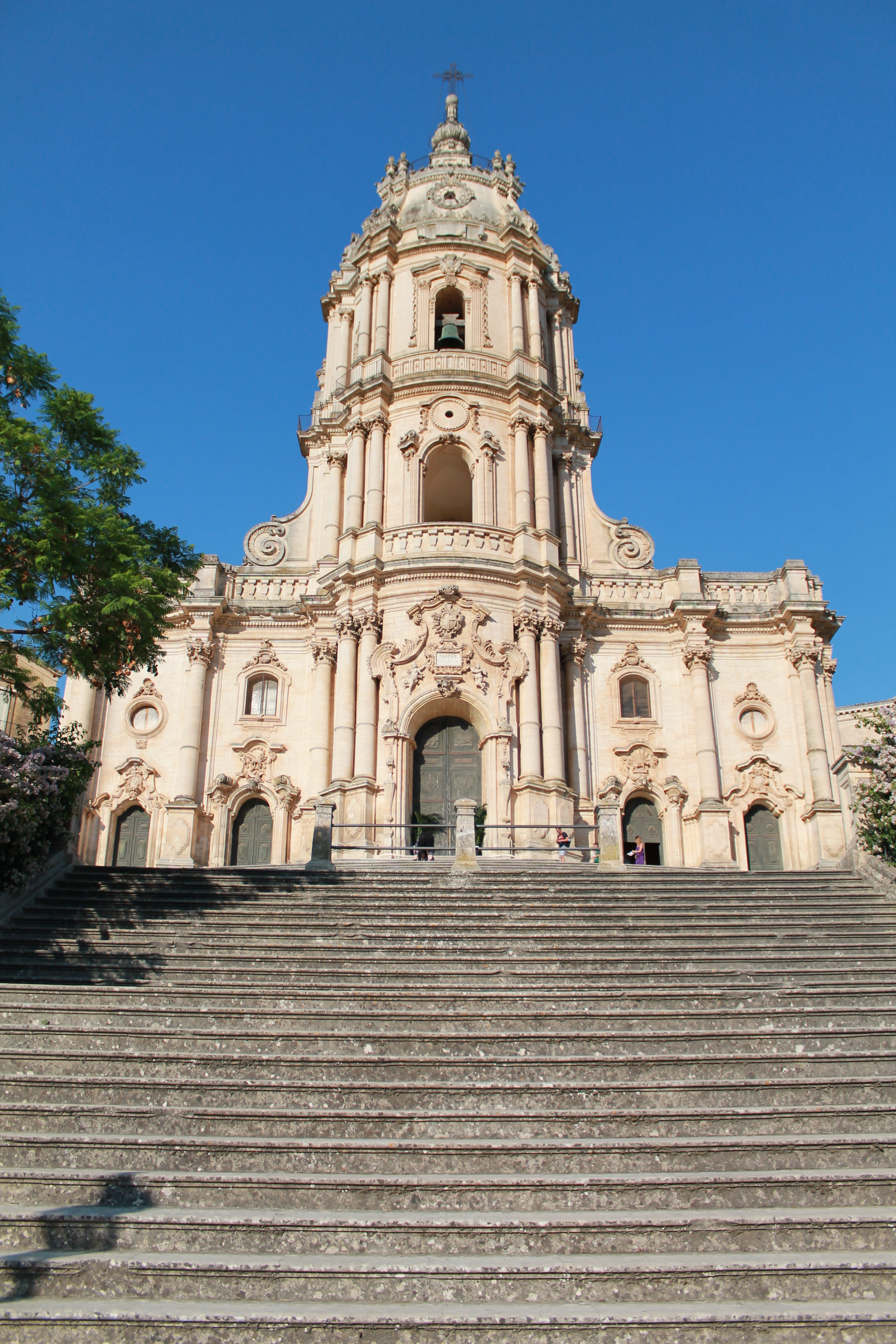
Church of San Giorgio, Modica

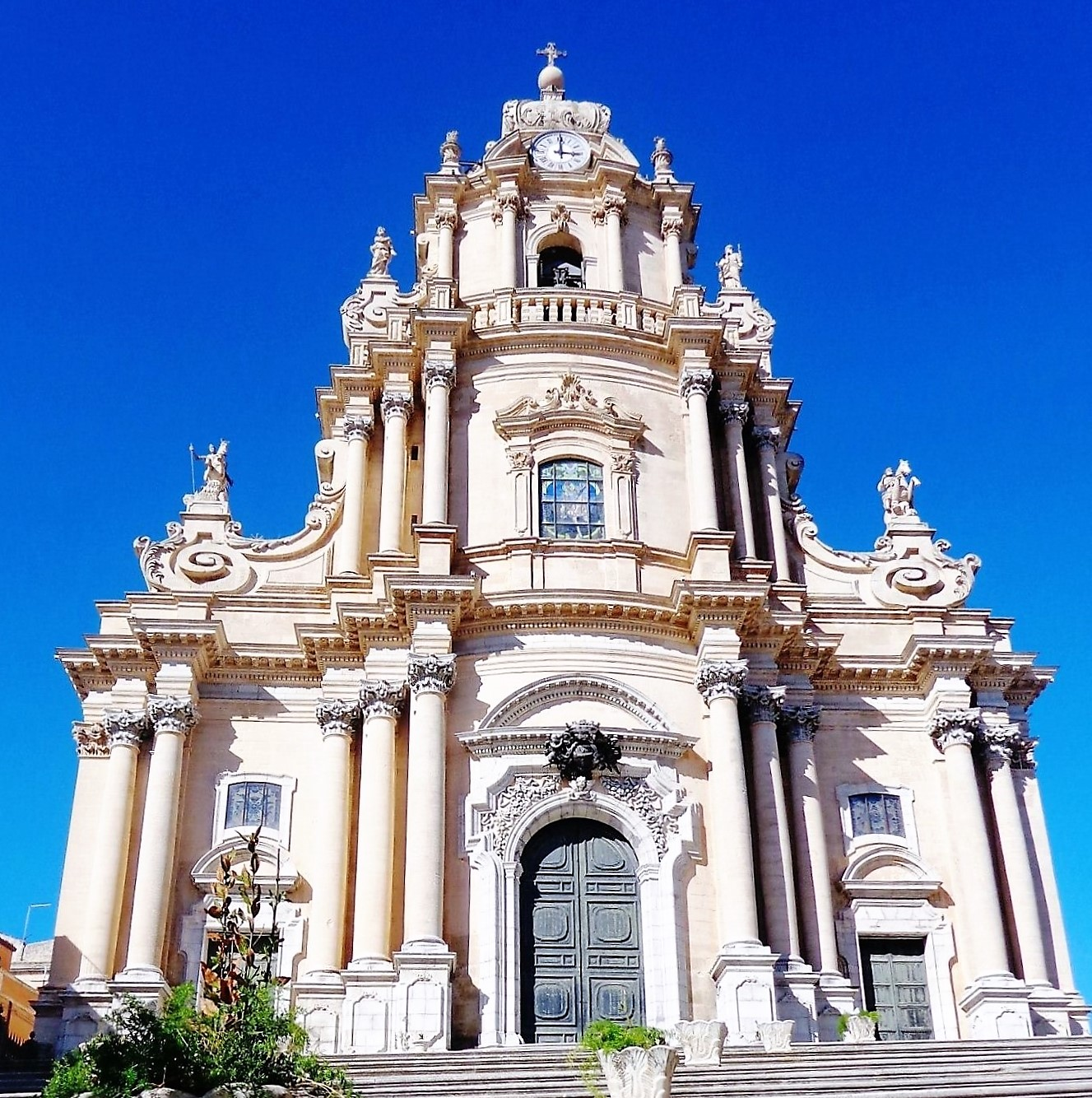
San Giorgio, Ragusa Ibla

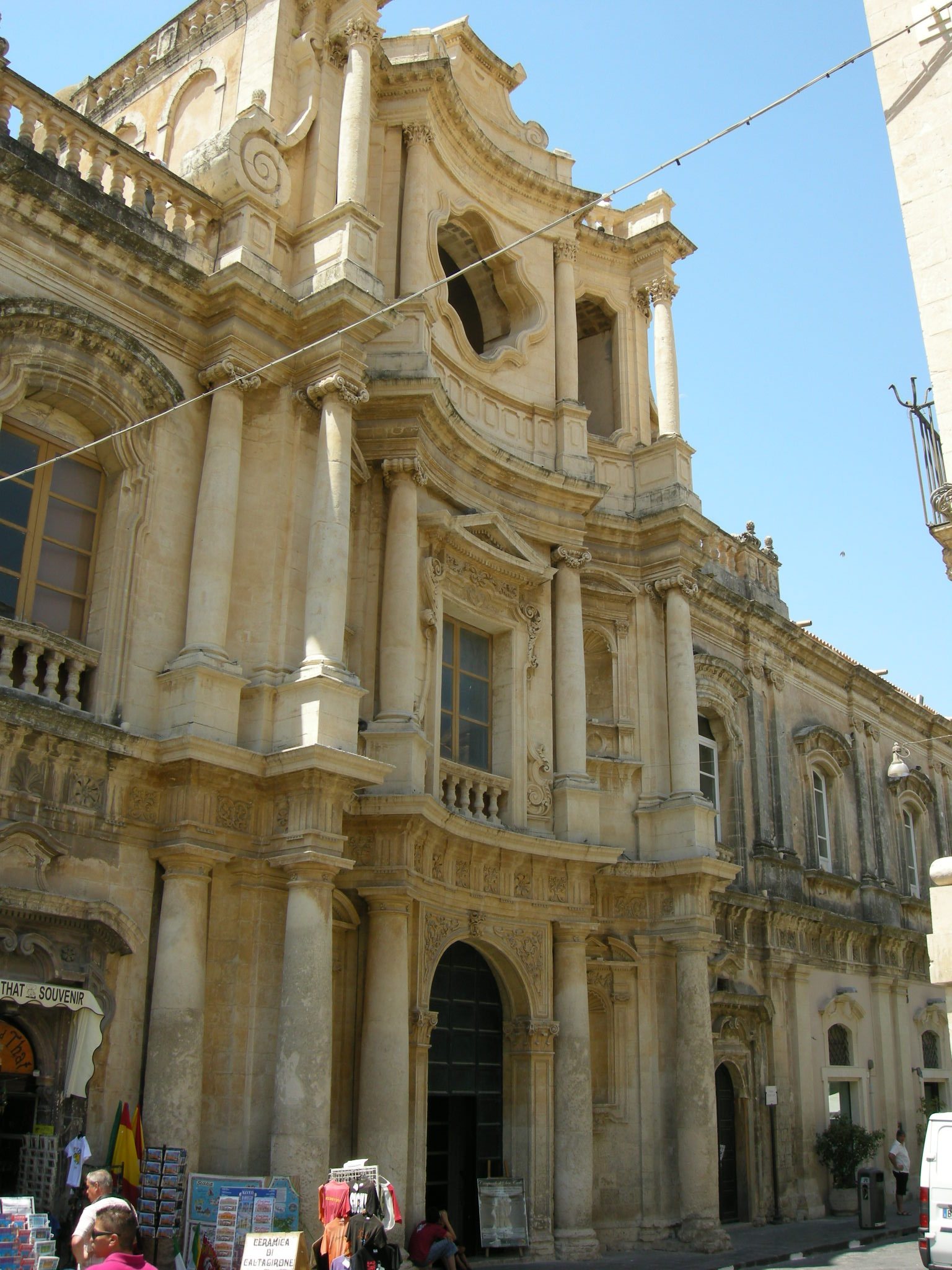
Façade of San Carlo al Corso, Noto

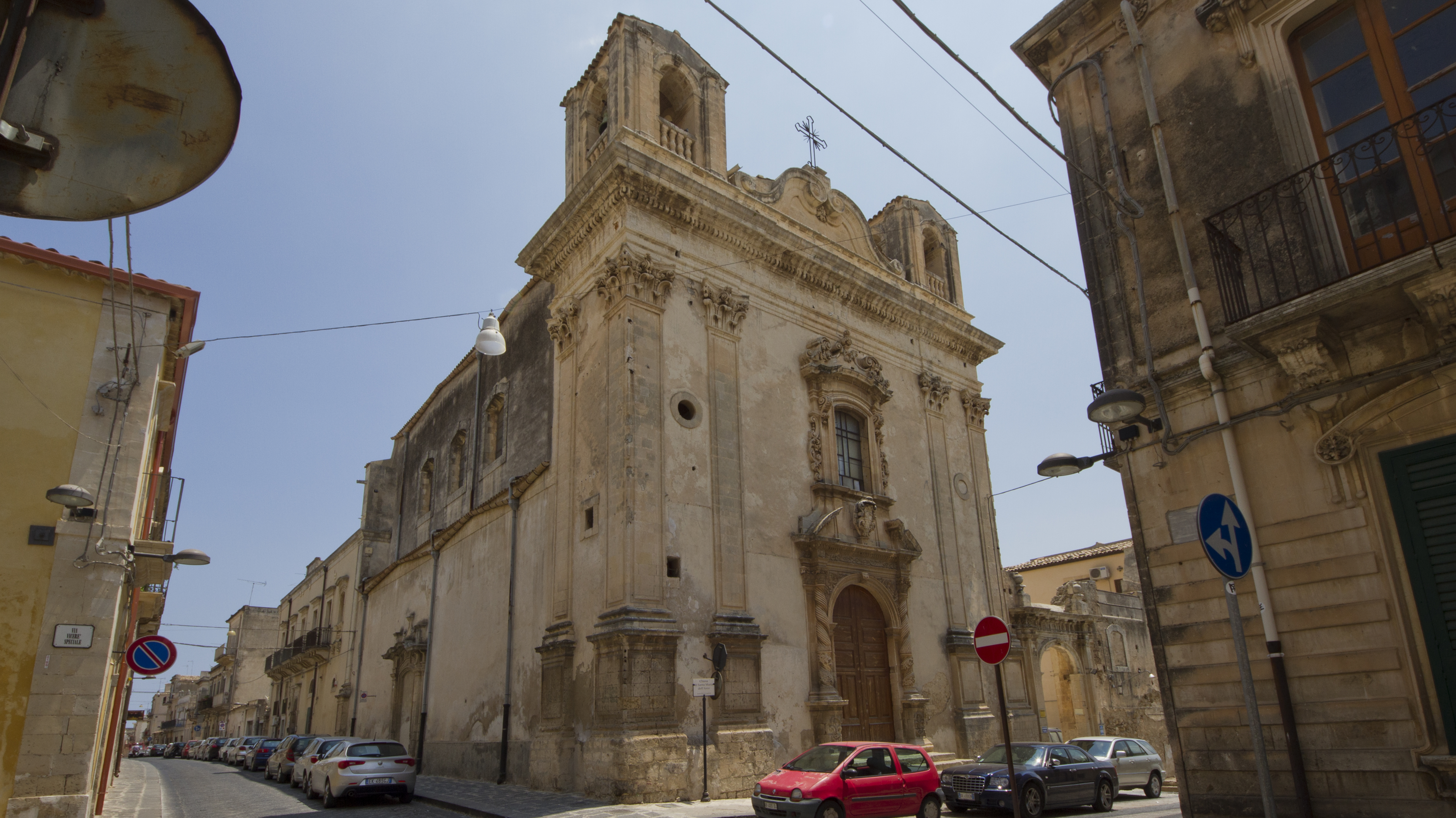
Santa Maria dell'Arco, Noto
