= Helorum =

Helorum may refer to several different things:

- Helorum, a figure in the Book of Mormon
- Helorus, an ancient city in Sicily
