= Giovanni Battista Landolina =

Sicilian landowner and mathematician

Giovanni Battista Landolina, "Marchese di S. Alfano", was a Sicilian landowner and intellectual (mathematician) instrumental in having the city of Noto removed from its former site on Mount Alveria and rebuilt in a more level location following the earthquake in 1693 centred on the Val di Noto. He is commemorated by a piazza in the city named in his honour.

Ultimate responsibility for the re-building of Sicily at this time was however in the hands of the Spanish viceroy, Duke of Camastra; but Landolina successfully argued his case for the rebuilding to be some 10 km. from the former site. He is credited with having designed the city with the help of three local architects. It is based on three parallel streets, interconnected by a series of narrower streets at right angles, thus producing a grid pattern, providing vistas to the three piazzas, each with their own church, the largest having a cathedral. Landolina's town planning philosophy was based on the Baroque system, in which the town was divided according to social rank and position, the aristocracy were given the highest sites, the church the town centre, to reflect their position at the centre of one's life, and the poor the periphery of the town where no one else wanted to live. Later the architects Giovanni Battista Vaccarini, and Rosario Gagliardi designed many buildings in the city.

== Palazzo Landolina ==
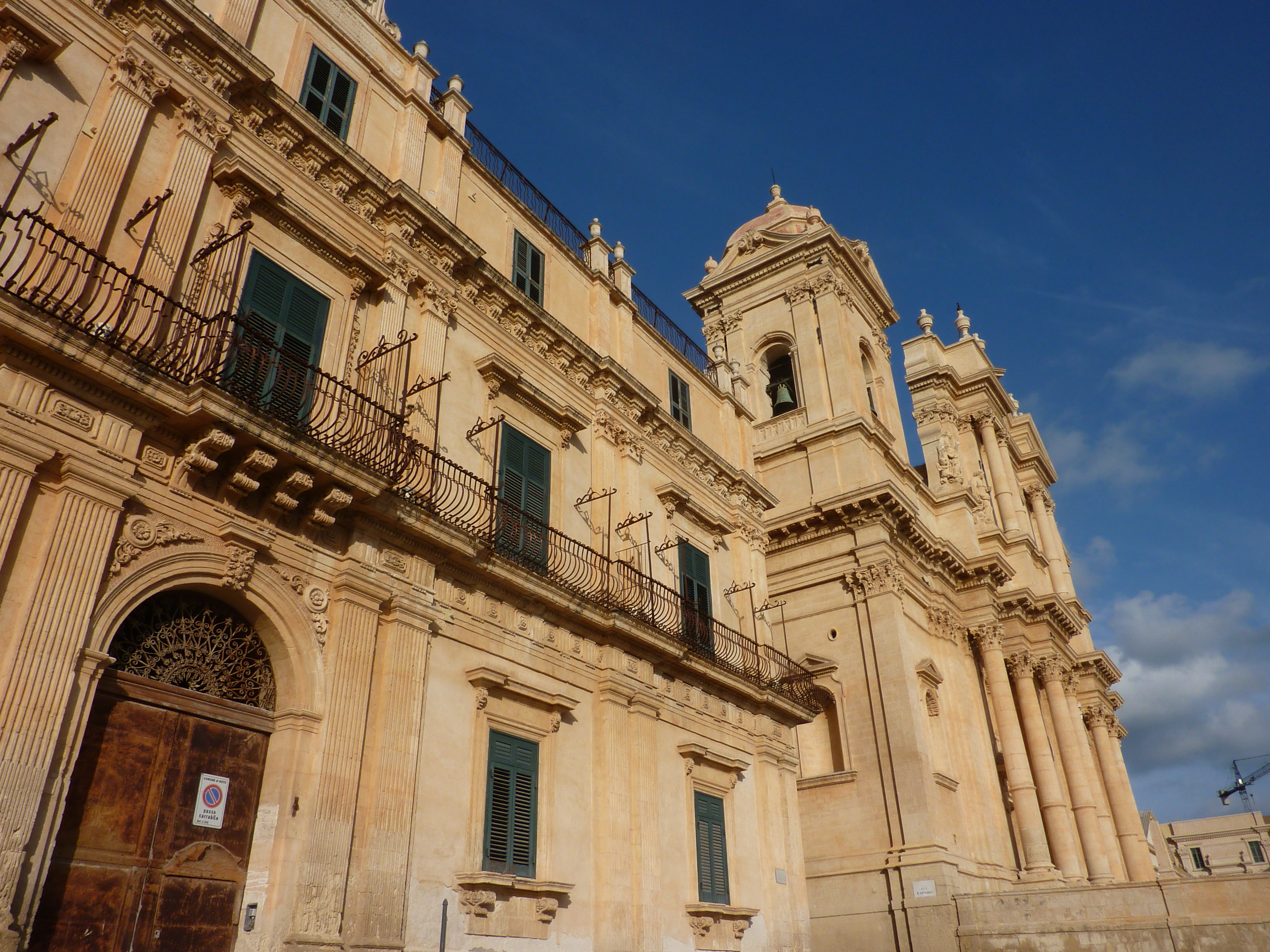
Palazzo Landolina in Noto

Landolina rule was broken in 1730 when his son Francesco Landolina, Marchese di S. Alfano, built his new house the "Palazzo Landolina", in the town centre next to the new cathedral. Today, Noto is a great tourist attraction owing to the many examples of Sicilian Baroque built during Landolina's time as town planner.
