= Villa Romana del Tellaro =

Roman villa in Noto, Sicily, Italy

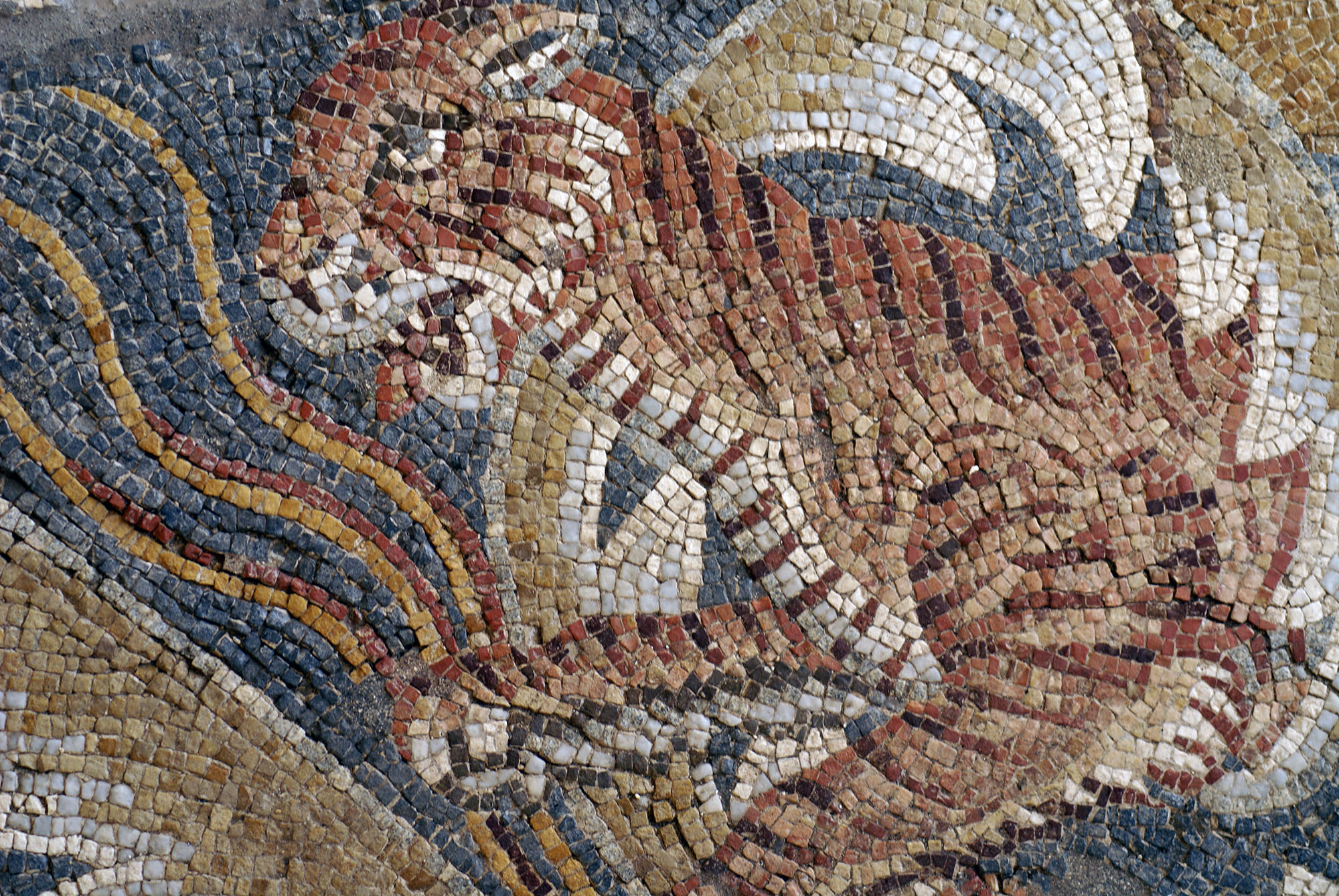
- Mosaic floor

- Location within Italy
- 36°50′07″N 15°04′43″E
- Type: Dwelling
- Periods: Roman Imperial
- Cultures: Roman
- Location: Noto, Province of Syracuse, Sicily, Italy

Site notes
- Condition: Restored
- Owner: Public
- Management: Soprintendenza BB.CC.AA. di Siracusa
- Public access: Yes
- Website: www.villaromanadeltellaro.com

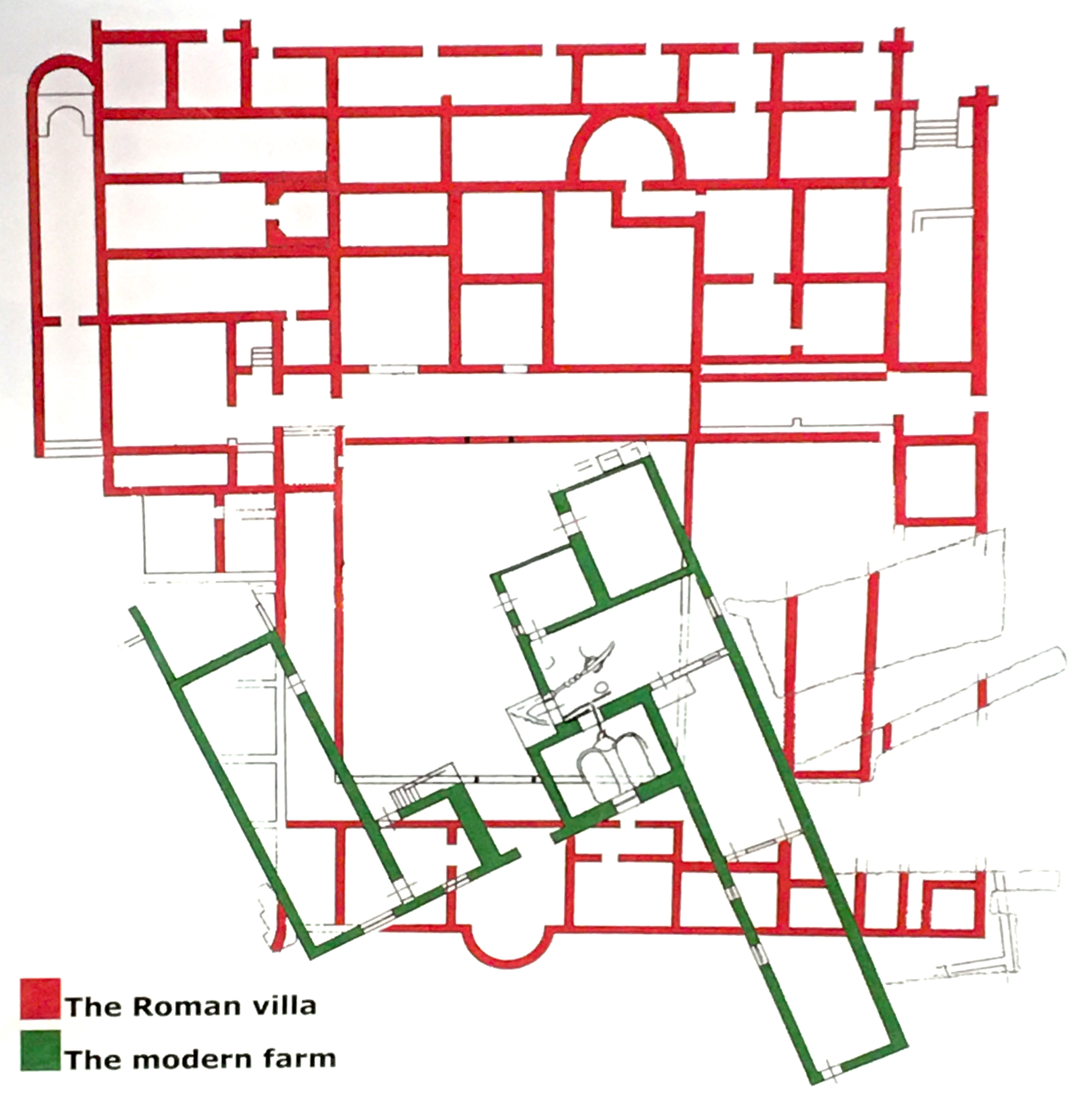
Plan showing later farm building overlay

The Villa Romana del Tellaro is a large, elaborate Roman villa dating from the late Roman Empire.

It is also known (in English) as the villa of Caddeddi, the name of the locality.

It is located south of Noto in the province of Syracuse, Sicily in southern Italy.

== Discovery and site ==
The remains of the villa were found in 1971 beneath an old farm building dating from the 17th century. Treasure hunters had tried to remove and sell the mosaics illegally but they were intercepted. Eventually, the farmhouse was bought to allow excavations and eventual opening to the public.

The site is near the Tellaro river in a fertile agricultural area.

In 2008, more than 30 years after the start of excavations, it was opened to the public.

== History ==
=== Background ===
The villa is likely to be one of the latifundia, or great private estates, specialising in agriculture destined for export (grain, olive oil, wine) which played a large role in society and in the economy in the Imperial period.

By the 2nd century AD, latifundia had displaced small farms as the agricultural foundation of the Roman Empire.

During the first two centuries of the Empire, however, Sicily had gone through an economic depression due to the production system of the large estates based on slave labour: Urban life had suffered a decline, the countryside was deserted and the rich owners did not reside there, as the lack of suitable villas would seem to indicate. Furthermore, the Roman government neglected the territory, which became a place of exile and a refuge for slaves and brigands.

At the beginning of the 4th century, rural Sicily entered a new period of prosperity with commercial settlements and agricultural villages reaching the apex of their expansion and activity. An obvious sign of transformation was the new title assigned to the governor of the island, from corrector to consularis. In the 4th century therefore, Sicily was not merely the "granary of Rome," but also became a favourite residence for families of the high Roman aristocracy, like the Nichomachi and the Caeionii, who brought with them the luxury and taste of the capital of the empire.

The reasons seem to be twofold: First of all, the renewed importance of the provinces of proconsular Africa and Tripolitania for grain supplies to Italy, while Egyptian production, which had up to then satisfied the needs of Rome, was sent to Constantinople (new imperial capital from 330). Sicily consequently assumed a central role on the new trade routes from Africa. Secondly, the more affluent classes, of equestrian and senatorial rank, began to abandon urban life by retreating to their possessions in the countryside, due to the growing tax burden and the expenses they had to pay for cities. The owners also looked after their own lands, which were no longer cultivated by slaves, but by colonists. Considerable sums of money were spent on enlarging, beautifying and making the villas more comfortable.

The latifundia were often owned by the Roman Senatorial class as they did not pay land taxes. It was the only acceptable source of wealth for senators, though Romans of the elite class would set up their freedmen as estate managers.

=== History of the villa ===
There was an earlier villa on the site and some of its walls have been found below the later one on a different alignment.

The villa was built after 350 AD as evidenced by a small hoard of coins dated to latest 348 AD found under a floor.

== The villa ==
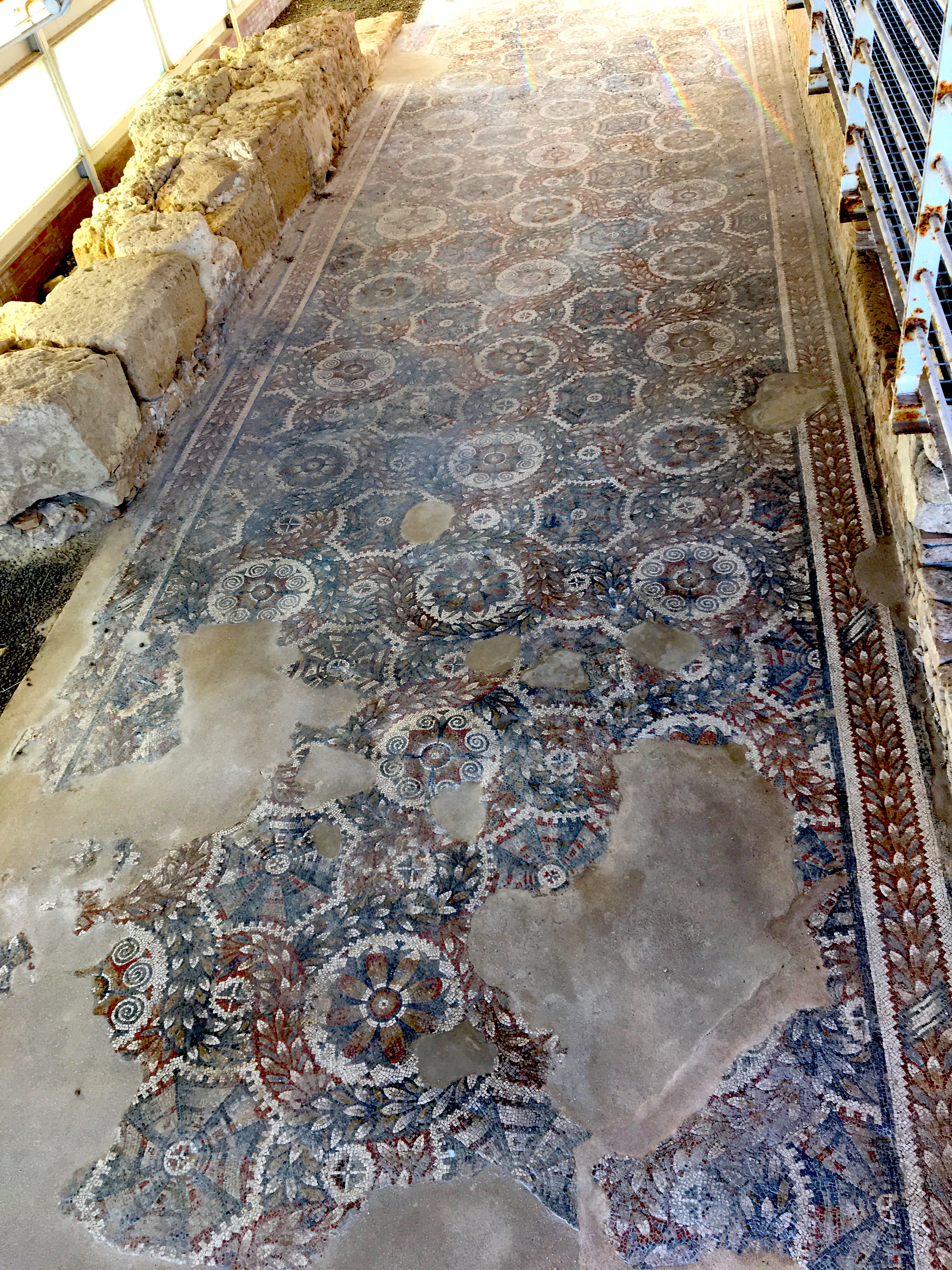
Portico mosaic

The villa was constructed around a 20m-long peristyle courtyard, on the north side of which opened three luxurious residential rooms of the villa decorated with exceptional figurative polychrome mosaic floors.

The high quality of the mosaics and the scenes depicted demonstrate not only the high artistic levels of the craftsmen, but also the refined taste, wealth and sophistication of the owners.

Many other mosaic floors that were probably in rooms to the north and east of them have completely disappeared, although a few mosaic fragments were found collapsed into basement rooms.

The main Roman road along the east coast of Sicily passed nearby to the east of the villa. The entrance to the villa was at its north-east corner, convenient for access from the road, and was imposing with a series of seven wide steps in white marble leading up to a small vestibule which had a geometric mosaic floor.

The portico on the north side had a 15 m-long mosaic floor with a veritable carpet of laurel wreaths forming circles and octagons with geometric and floral motifs. More octagonal medallions with concave sides fill the voids between the laurel wreaths, forming a continuous pattern with bright colours and brilliantly mastered chromatic variations, giving the pattern depth, naturalness and fluidity. This mosaic, in contrast to the others, was not removed and reassembled after conservation, and still exhibits some dark stains on its western side, traces of the fire that destroyed the building around the middle of the 5th century AD. The notable unevenness of the floor's surface is also a consequence of the fire, whether through the roof collapsing or due to the many earthquakes that have occurred over the centuries.

=== Mosaic of the ransom of the body of Hector ===
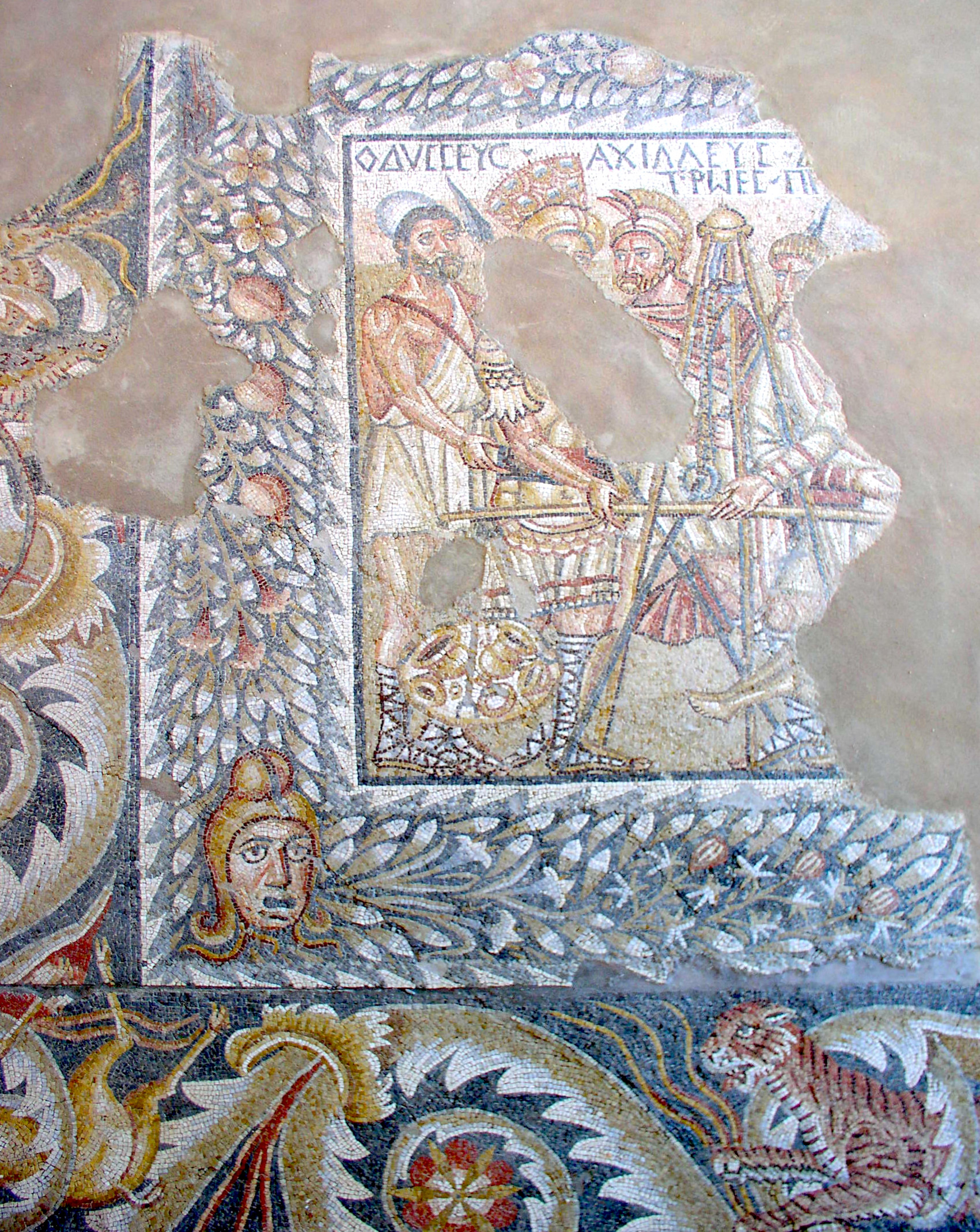
Hector mosaic

In the first of the three rooms is a mosaic floor with scenes of the ransom of the body of Hector from Homer's epic poem, the Iliad. Only the southwest corner of the mosaic is preserved as the rest was destroyed by one of the rooms of the farm, which was later demolished in order to uncover the north section of the villa. A frame with whorls of leaves and flowers, a tiger, a leopard and an antelope, and a second inner frame with garlands of leaves and flowers and theatrical masks on the comers surround the central scene of the mosaic (émblema). Ancient Greek inscriptions indicate the characters.

From left to right, we see Ulysses, Achilles (the upper part of the head with the helmet with a high feathered crest is preserved), Diomedes and perhaps the herald Idaios, while the figures of the old Priam and the Trojans have been lost. The characters are arranged around weighing scales, in the left pan of which, we see the gold vessels for Hector's ransom, while in the right pan lies Hector's body of which only the feet are visible.

The theatrical masks at the corners are there for a reason: the scene of the weighing of Hector's body is not described in Homer's Iliad, but it was likely performed in this way on the stage by Aeschylus (in the lost play "Phrygians"). The choice of depicting a specific version of this myth is evidence of the refined, still profoundly Greek, culture of the owners of the villa. as the ancient Greek inscriptions also suggest.

The room must have been the main public reception room of the villa and probably a banquet hall.

=== Bacchus mosaic ===
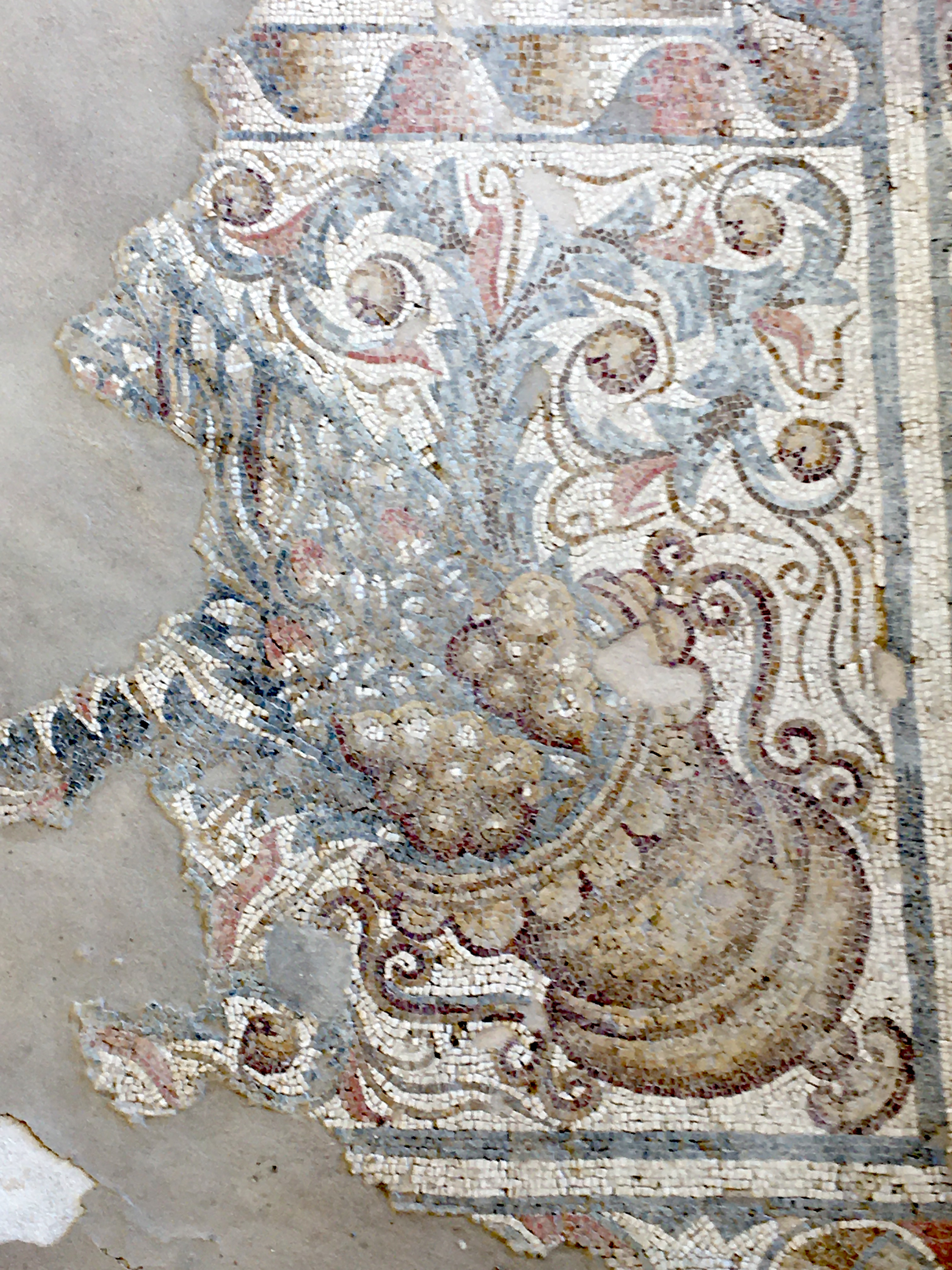
Bacchus mosaic krater

The central room is the smallest of the three. It contains the Bacchus mosaic, adorned with the traditional representations of various fruits and scenes of satyrs and maenads surrounding Bacchus himself, and is stylistically similar to some from Carthage, perhaps even the work of the same group of craftsmen. The mosaic has four large kraters in the corners from which festoons of leaves, flowers and fruit emerge to form an arch over four rectangular frames. Each frame features a satyr and a maenad dancing with musical instruments in their hands. The central scene has been lost but it probably showed the god Dionysus to whose court the Satyrs and Maenads belonged. Four masks are depicted above the festuons, close to the corners. This is another example or the mastery of the mosaic technique and the use of colours in the creation of vivid scenes and figures rich in decorative detail, including the symmetry of the decorative scheme.

=== Hunt mosaic ===
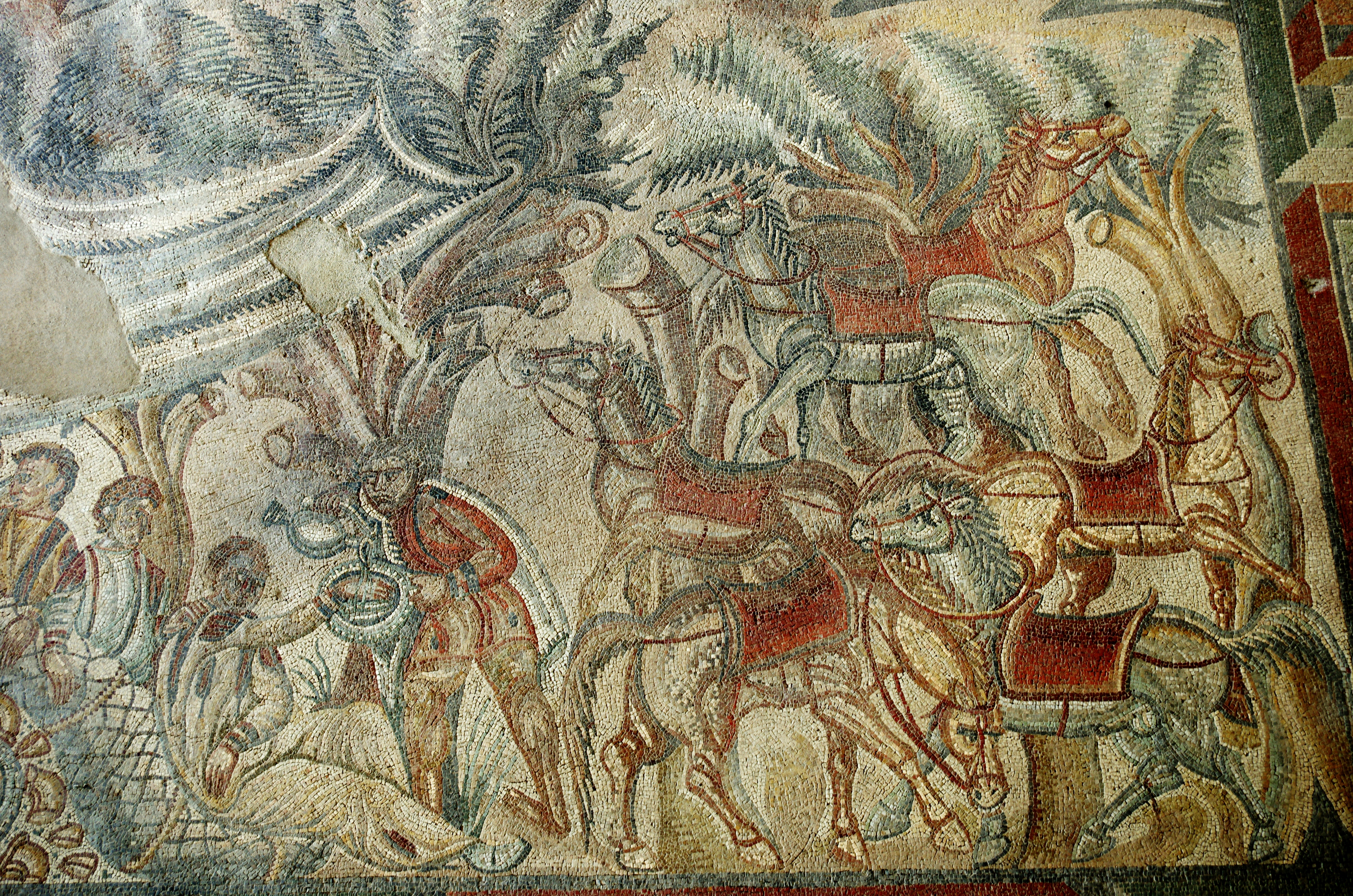
Part of hunting scene mosaic

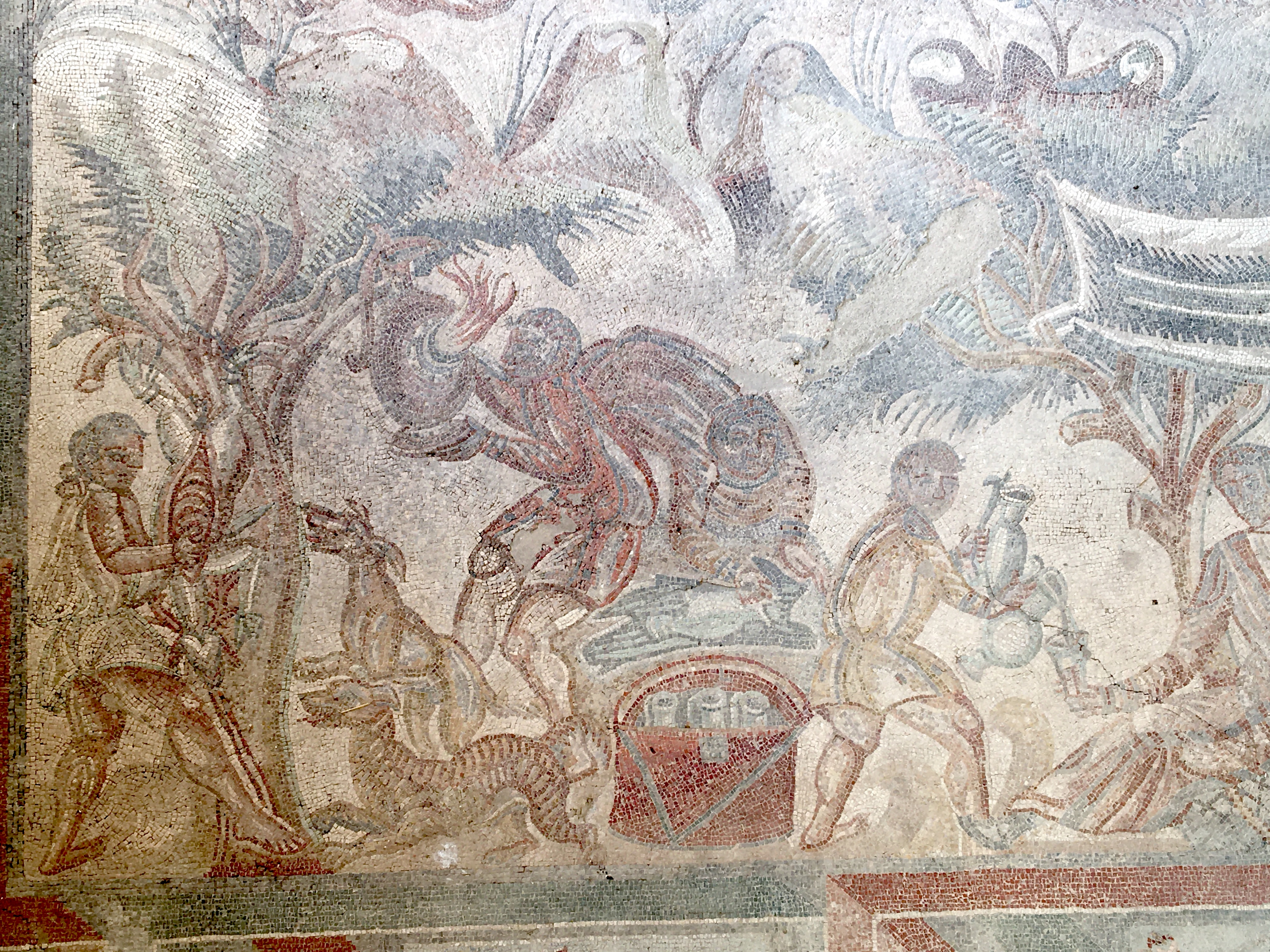
Hunt mosaic

The mosaic floor in the third room shows a hunting scene with a banquet in the open air among the trees. The female figure in the scene is the personification of Africa. It is bordered by a frame with aquatic birds alternating with swastika figures. The actions are highly vivid and realistic: in the right-hand scene, the artist put much effort into reproducing water reflections around the legs of the men and animals crossing the river; in the left-hand scene, he depicted the terror on the face of the hunter defeated by the tiger, while a comrade holding a spear arrives from above to help. In the lower section, the excitement of the upper scenes gives way to the calmer representation of a banquet at the end of the strenuous hunt; the horses are now tied to the trees and the bounty lies on the table. Only the servants are still busy around the diners, pouring wine for one, water to wash the hands of another, while others on the left are preparing food. The sense of motion, realism and the great freedom in the arrangement of the scenes and the wise use of colour distinguish this amazing mosaic. The scenes are reminiscent of the mosaics in the Villa Romana del Casale near Piazza Armerina. However, this mosaic has more stylised figures and two-dimensional, uncertain proportions, making the effect very different.

The mosaics were probably the work of craftsmen from North Africa. Based on numismatic evidence, they were made in the second half of the fourth century.

The villa was destroyed by fire in the middle of the 5th century and never rebuilt.

== Gallery ==
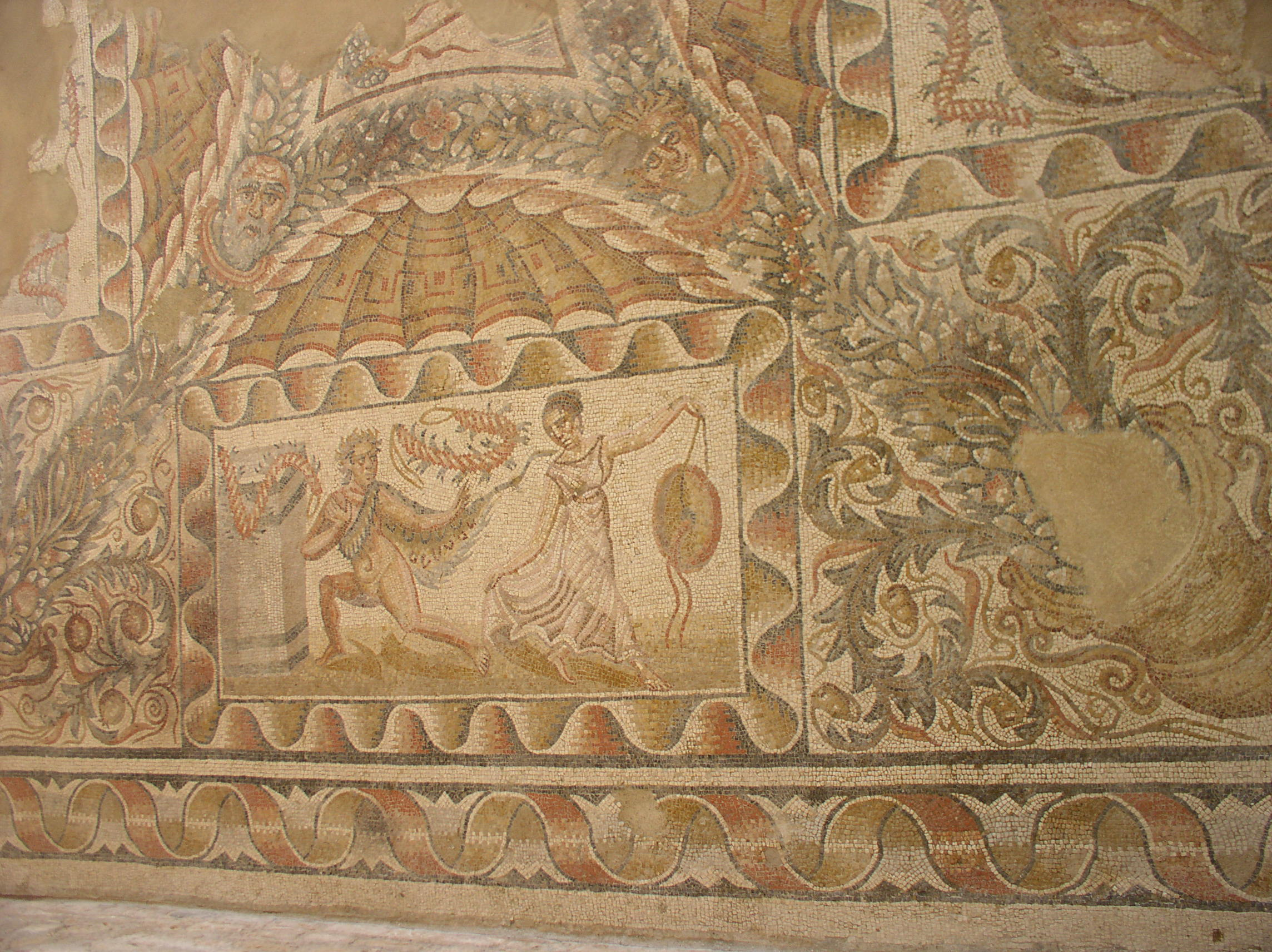
Satyr

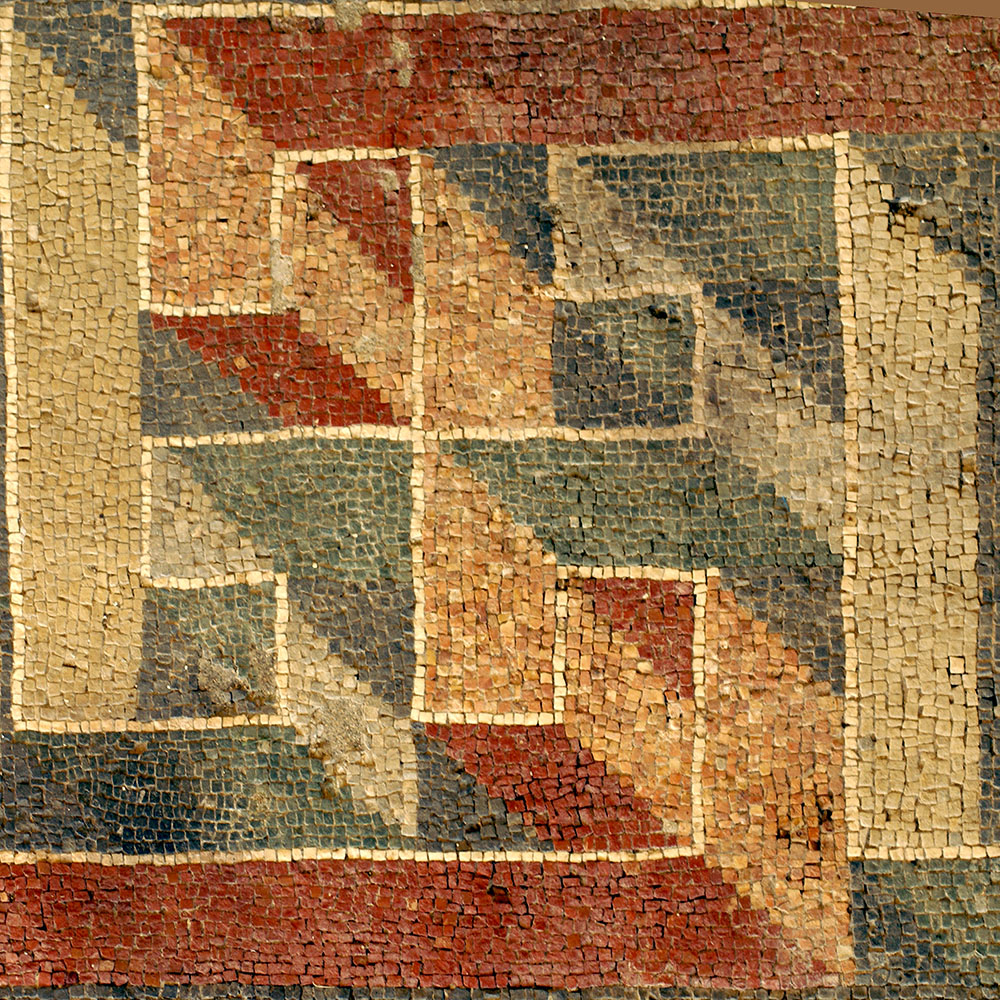
Geometric motif
