= San Carlo al Corso =

San Carlo al Corso may refer to:

- San Carlo al Corso, Milan, church in Milan, Italy
- San Carlo al Corso, Noto, church in Noto, Italy
- Sant'Ambrogio e Carlo al Corso, church in Rome, Italy
