= Riserva naturale orientata Oasi Faunistica di Vendicari =

Protected area in Italy

- Riserva di Vendicari
- IUCN category IV (habitat/species management area)
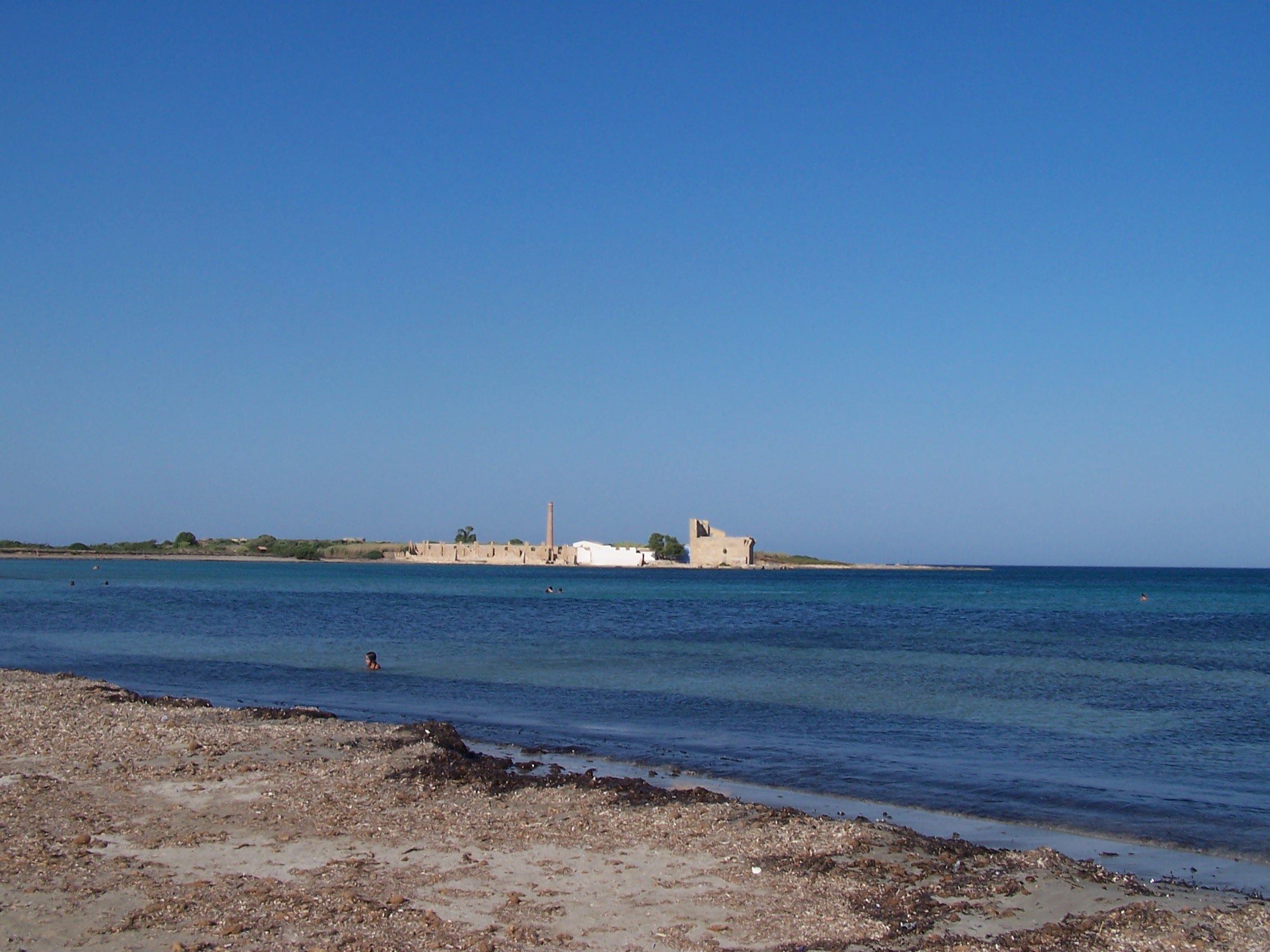
- Interactive map of Riserva naturale orientata Oasi Faunistica di Vendicari
- Location: Noto, Pachino, Province of Syracuse, Italy
- Coordinates: 36°47′26″N 15°05′27″E
- Area: 1,512 ha (3,736 acres)
- Established: 1984
- Governing body: Regione Siciliana
- Website: www.cavagrandedelcassibile.it

The Oasi Faunistica of Vendicari is a nature reserve near the towns of Noto and Pachino in the Province of Syracuse, Sicily, Italy.

It was established in 1984 and opened to the public in 1989. It extends for 1,512 ha (3,736 acres).

== Description ==
The reserve includes a large lagoon, beaches, sand dunes, and salt pans, making it an important wetland area and a vital stopover for migratory birds. It is estimated that about 180 species of birds visit the reserve each year, including pink flamingos, spoonbills, and herons.

The reserve also featured ruins from Ancient Greece, the remains of a Byzantine necropolis, and an old tuna fishery.
