= San Domenico, Noto =

Church building in Noto, Italy

Coordinates: 36.89213°N 15.06814°E

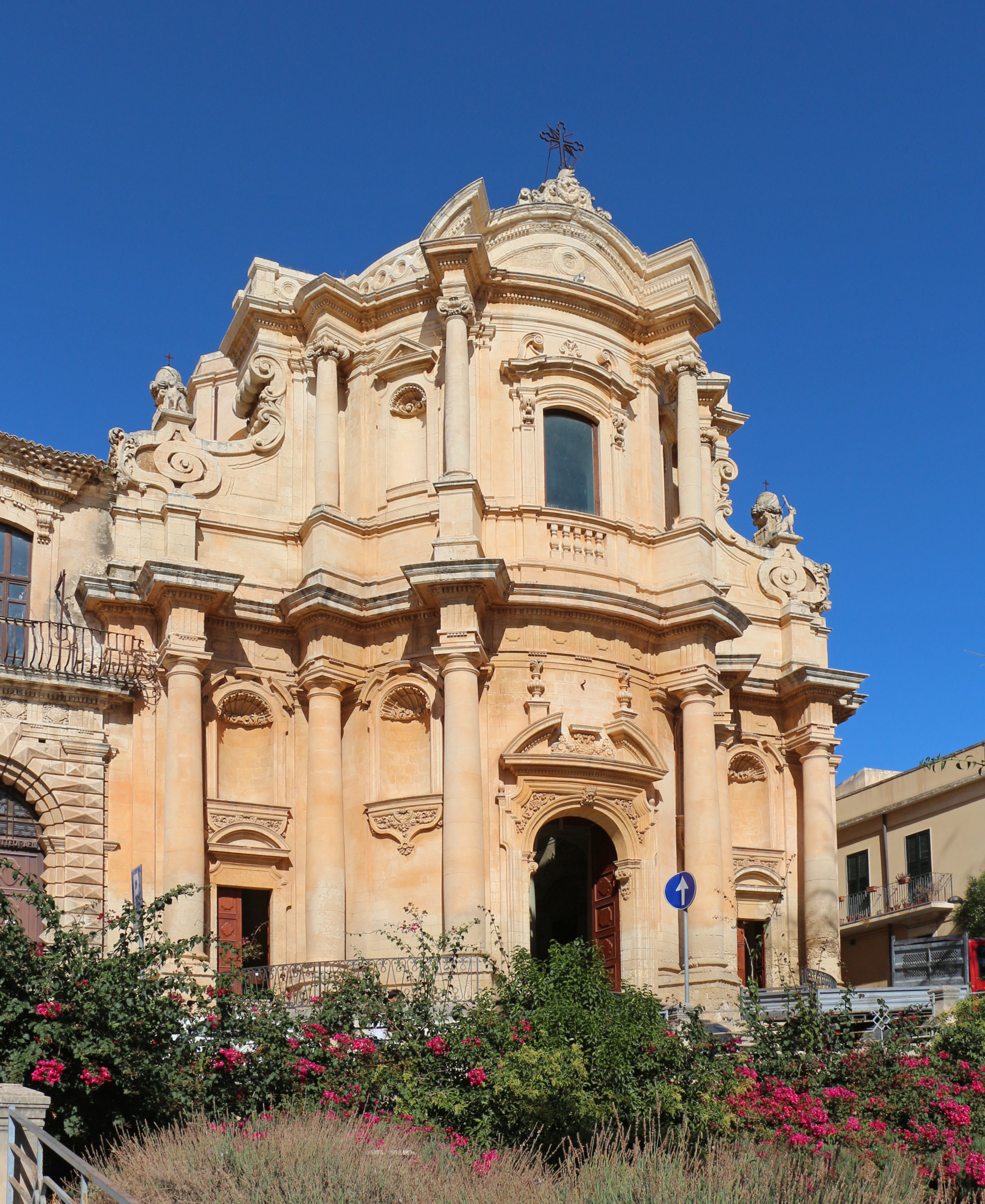
Church of San Domenico, Piazza XVI Maggio, Noto, Sicily, Italy

San Domenico is a Baroque-style, Roman Catholic church and monastery located on via Matteo Raeli facing Piazza XVI Maggio in the town of Noto (province of Syracuse) in the region of Sicily, Italy. Across the park with the Fontana di Ercole and Via Vittorio Emmanuele rises the town's opera house, now called the Teatro Comunale Tina di Lorenzo. The church is considered one of the masterworks of the architect Rosario Gagliardi.

== History ==
The church was erected between 1703 and 1727 using designs by Gagliardi. It rises above the avenue level of the park. The concave facade is rich in projecting columns, doric at the base and ionic in the second story.

The interior has three naves with polychrome marble side altars. The interior has a rich stucco decoration. The third altar to the left depicts a sculpted crucifixion with scenes of the Passion. Others depict a St Dominic receiving the Holy Spirit and a Madonna of the Rosary (1712) by Vito D’Anna. The main altar has a depiction of the Madonna of the Rosary in a gilded wooden ciborium designed by Antonio Basile.
