= Santissimo Salvatore, Noto =

Church and Benedictine monastery in Noto, Italy

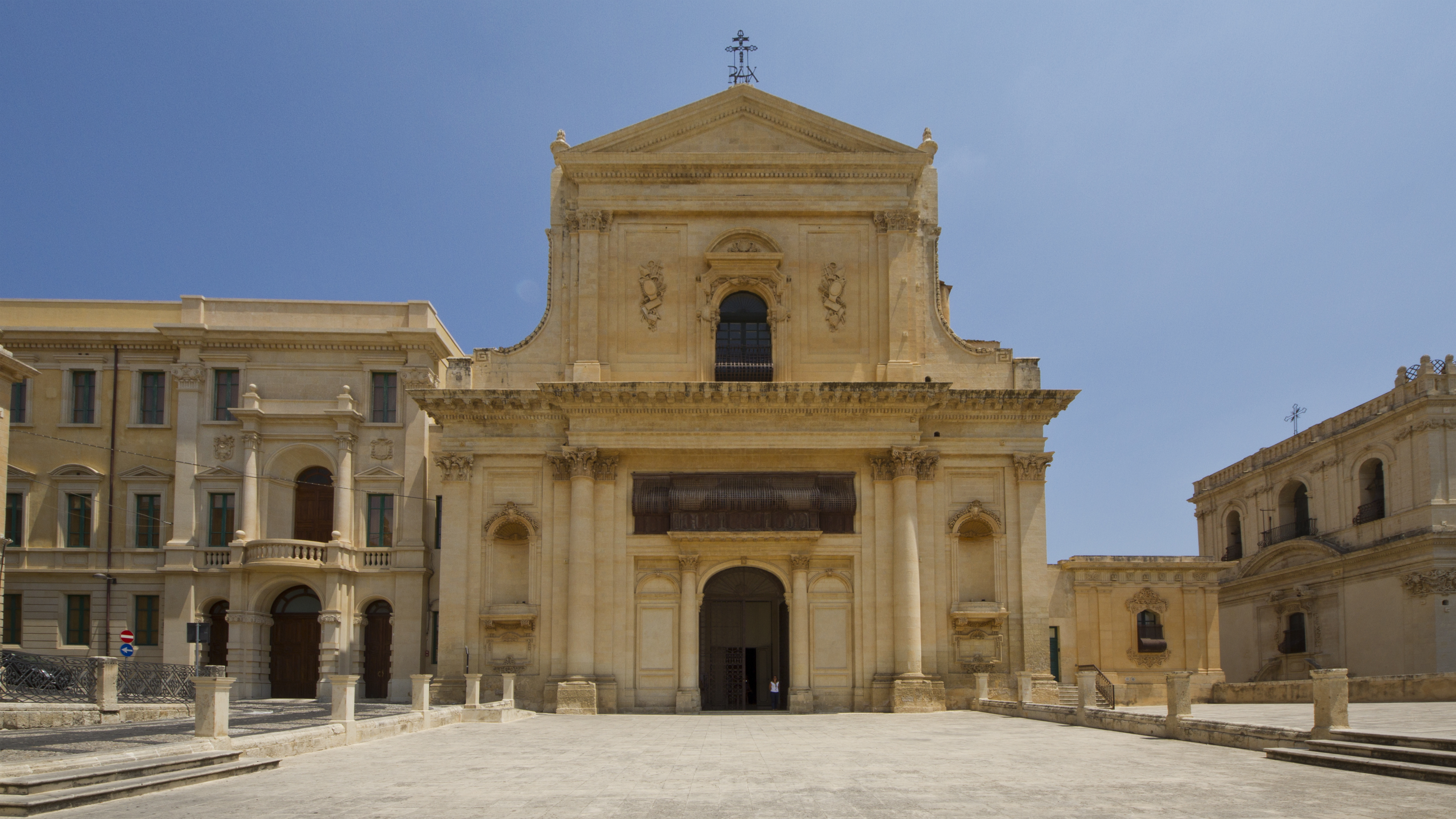
Facade and adjacent seminary

Santissimo Salvatore is a Baroque-style, Roman Catholic church and Benedictine monastery located on Via Vincento Gioberti in the town of Noto, region of Sicily, Italy. While the church is still consecrated, the adjacent convent no longer has cloistered nuns and instead houses the seminarians.

== History and description ==
The present church and monastery, dedicated to the Holy Saviour, replaced an earlier complex. The prior convent was said to house the relics of San Destituto. The adjacent buildings are used as the seminary of the Diocese of Noto. Part of the seminary was rebuilt in 1932 after a fire. Called the Seminario Nuovo, since formerly it was located adjacent to the Cathedral of Noto.

The monastery rises along Corso Vittorio Emanuele, facing the Monasteries of the Franciscans (San Francesco all’Immacolata) and the Poor Clares (Santa Chiara). The church and monastery were designed in the first half of the 1700s by Vincenzo Sinatra, who died before it was completed. Like all of Noto, it was rebuilt after the 1693 Sicily Earthquake. The facade and counterfacade have second story balconies with iron grillwork, which was meant to allow the cloistered nuns to hear mass separately from the lay public and to have a view of the piazza in front of the church.
