= Noto =

City in Sicily, Italy

Noto Nèiton (Greek)
- Comune
- Città di Noto
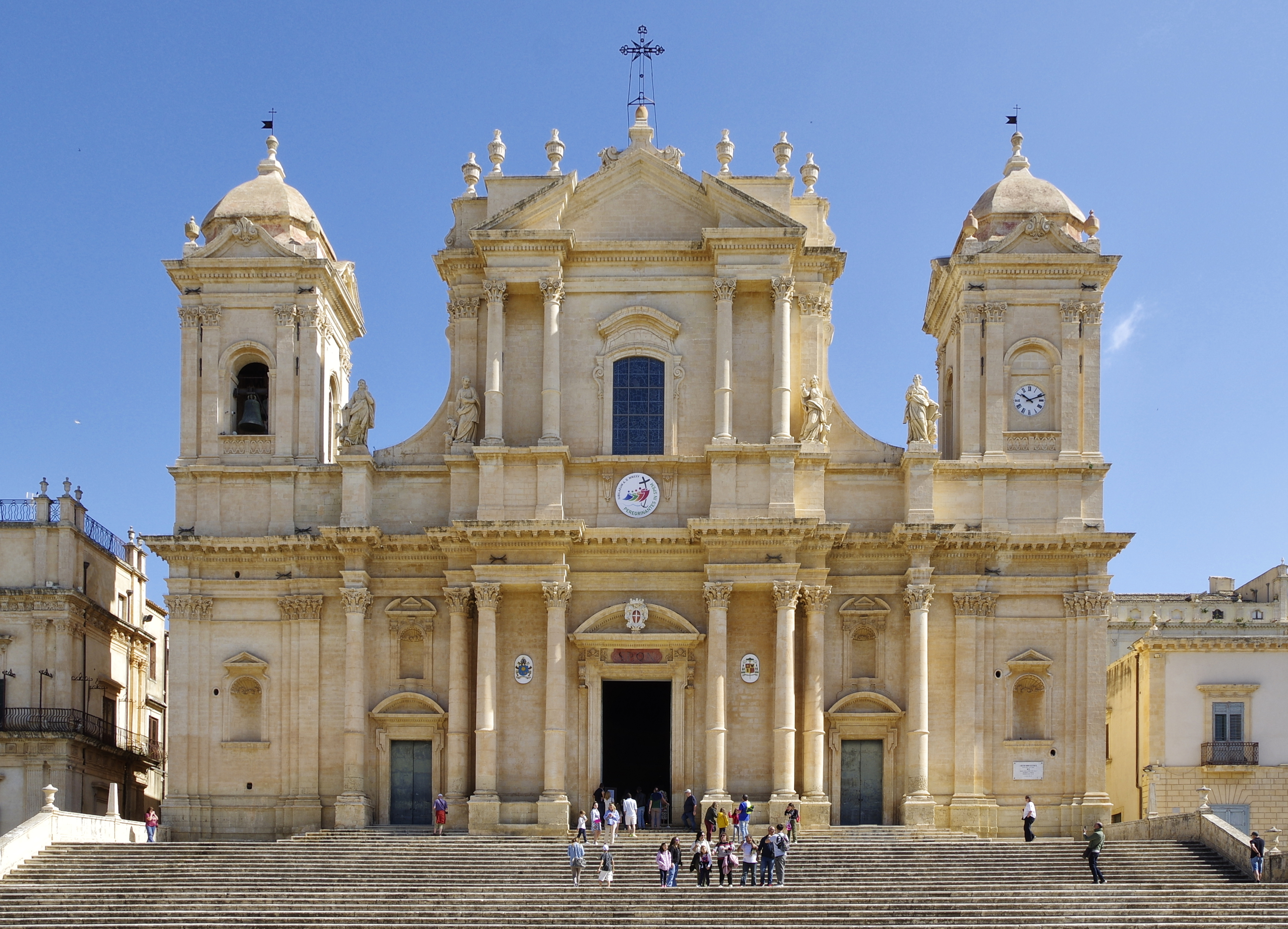
- Noto Cathedral

- Coat of arms

- Location within Italy Location within Sicily
- Coordinates: 36°53′N 15°05′E
- Country: Italy
- Region: Sicily
- Province: Siracusa (SR)
- Frazioni: see list

Government
  - Mayor: Corrado Figura

Area
  - Total: 550.86 km^{2} (212.69 sq mi)
- Elevation: 152 m (499 ft)

Population (31 December 2022)
  - Total: 24,264
  - Density: 44.047/km^{2} (114.08/sq mi)
- Demonym: Notinesi or Netini
- Time zone: UTC+1 (CET)
  - Summer (DST): UTC+2 (CEST)
- Postal code: 96017
- Dialing code: 0931
- Patron saint: San Corrado Confalonieri
- Saint day: February 19
- Website: www.comune.noto.sr.it

UNESCO World Heritage Site
- Part of: Late Baroque Towns of the Val di Noto (South-Eastern Sicily)
- Criteria: Cultural: (i)(ii)(iv)(v)
- Reference: 1024rev-005
- Inscription: 2002 (26th Session)
- Area: 21.38 ha (2,301,000 sq ft)
- Buffer zone: 48.09 ha (5,176,000 sq ft)

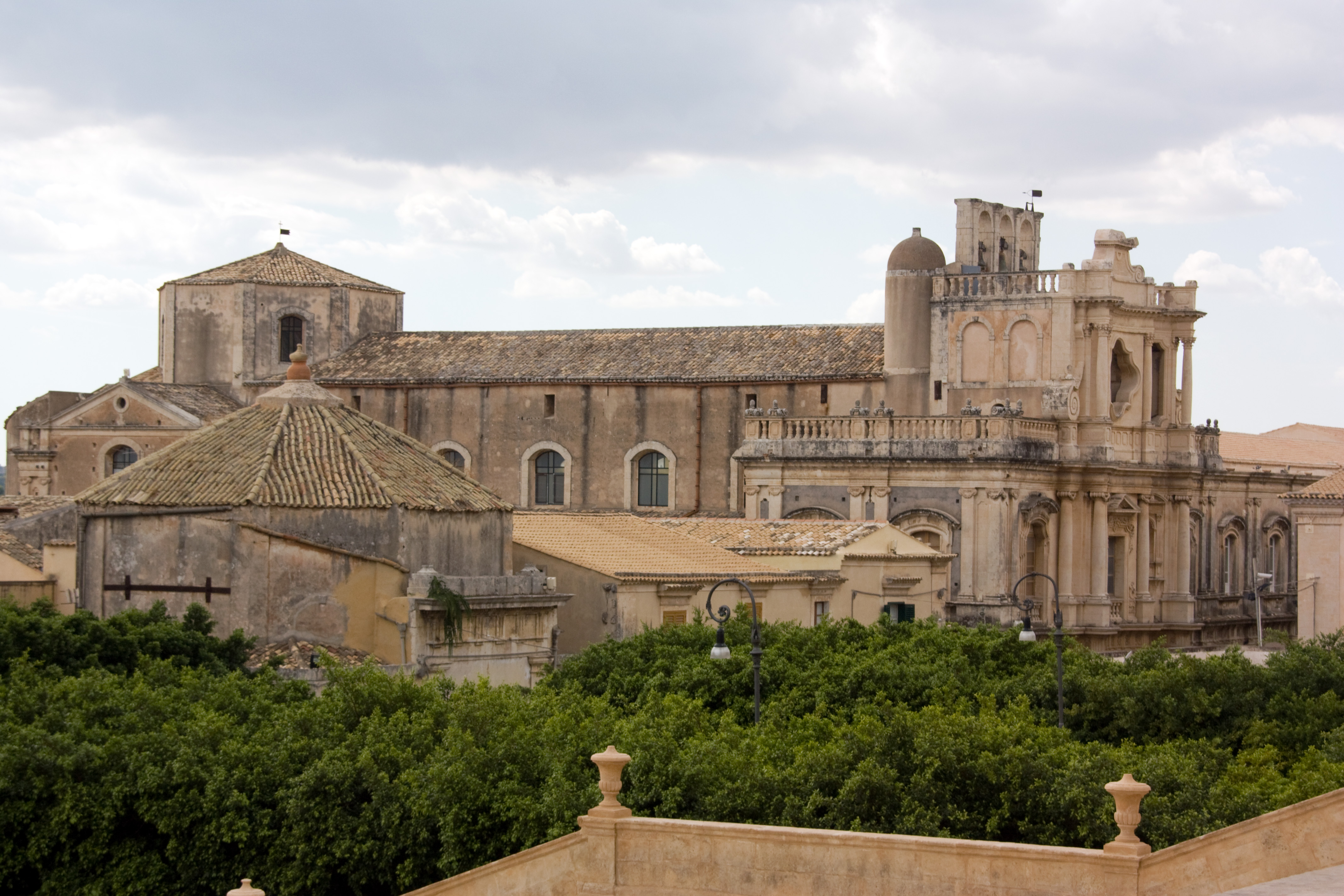
Church of St. Charles Borromeo.

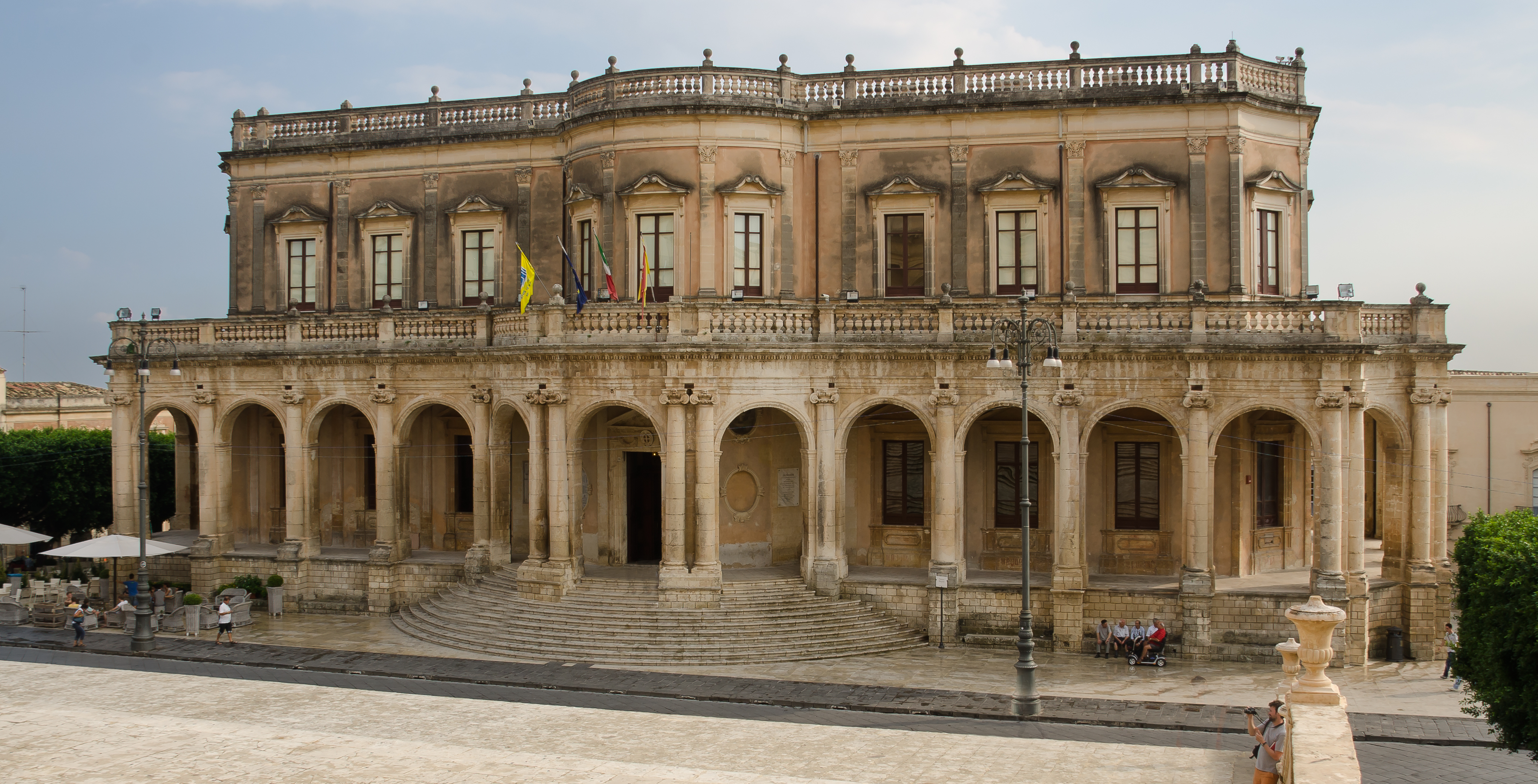
A view of Noto Town Hall.

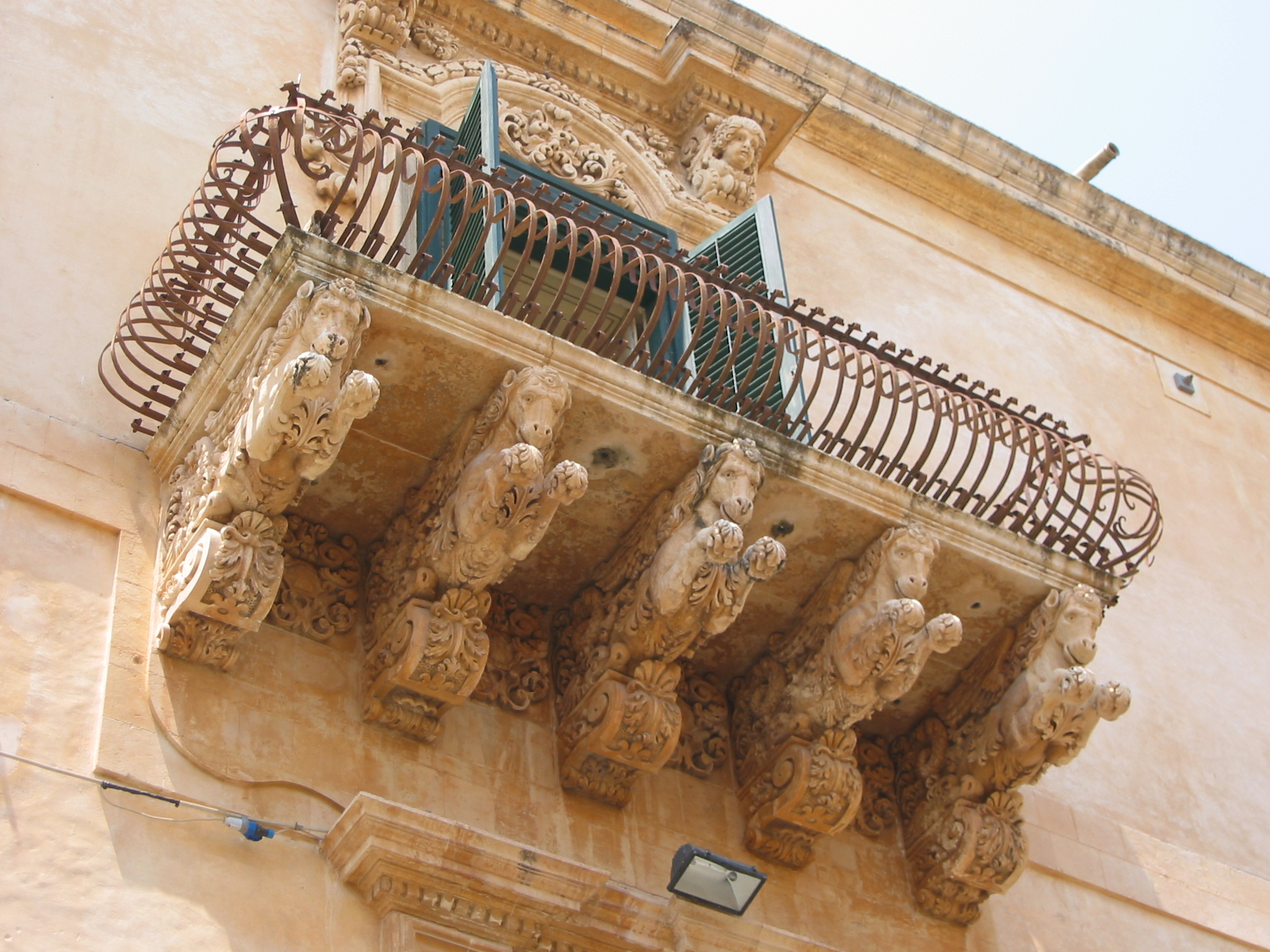
A balcony of the Villadorata palace.

Noto (Sicilian: Notu; Latin: Netum) is a city and comune in the Province of Syracuse, Sicily, Italy. It is 32 kilometres (20 mi) southwest of the city of Syracuse at the foot of the Hyblaean Mountains. It lends its name to the surrounding area Val di Noto. In 2002 Noto and its church were declared a UNESCO World Heritage Site.

== Etymology ==
The exact origin of the name "Noto" is unclear. Its name in Ancient Greek was Νέητον (Néēton), which could be related to Ancient Greek νέᾰτος (néătos, "uttermost, lowest"). The site of ancient Noto dates to the early Bronze Age (c. 3000 BC), so the name could be of pre-Greek origin.

== History ==
The old town, Noto Antica, lies 8 kilometres (5 mi) directly north on Mount Alveria. A city of Sicel origin, it was known as Netum in ancient times. In 263 BCE the city was granted to Hiero II by the Romans. According to legend, Daedalus stayed in the city after his flight over the Ionian Sea, as did Hercules after his seventh task. During the Roman era, it opposed the magistrate Verres.

In 866, the Muslims conquered the city. In 1091, after the Norman conquest of the island, which began in 1061 with the landing of Robert Guiscard and Roger I of Hauteville, Noto, the last Arab stronghold in Sicily, fell definitively under Norman rule, thus marking the end of Muslim rule in Sicily. The city was enfeoffed by the Great Count Roger to his son Jordan of Hauteville, who began construction of the castle and Christian churches. During the reign of Emperor Frederick II, the Cistercian monastery of Santa Maria dell'Arco was built in Noto, governed by Lord Isinbardo Morengia. Jordan of Hauteville, the eldest son of the first Norman Count of Sicily, was made lord of Noto. Under Norman rule, it later flourished as a wealthy and influential city.

In the 16th and 17th centuries, the city was home to several notable intellectual figures, including Giovanni Aurispa, jurists Andrea Barbazio and Antonio Corsetto, architect Matteo Carnelivari, and composer Mario Capuana. In 1503 King Ferdinand III granted it the title of civitas ingeniosa ("Ingenious City"). In the following centuries, the city expanded, growing beyond its medieval limits, and new buildings, churches, and convents were built.

The medieval town of Noto was virtually razed by the 1693 Sicilian earthquake. Over half the population is said to have died in the quake. It was decided to rebuild the town at the present site, on the left bank of the River Asinaro, closer to the Ionian shore. These circumstances have given Noto a unique architectural homogeneity, since the core of the town was built over the decades after the calamity in a typical and highly preserved example of Sicilian baroque. The layout followed a grid system by Giovanni Battista Landolina and utilized the sloping hillside for scenographic effects. The architects Rosario Gagliardi, Francesco Sortino, and others participated in designing multiple structures. The town was dubbed the "Stone Garden" by Cesare Brandi and is listed among UNESCO's World Heritage Sites. Many of the newer structures are built of a soft tufa stone, which assumes a honey tonality under sunlight. Parts of the cathedral unexpectedly collapsed in 1996.

The city, which lost its provincial capital status in 1817, rebelled against the House of Bourbon on 16 May 1860, leaving its gates open to Giuseppe Garibaldi and his expedition. On 21 October, a plebiscite sealed the annexation of Noto to Piedmont.

In 1844, Noto was named a diocese, but in 1866 it suffered the abolition of the religious guilds, which had been deeply linked to the city's structures and buildings.

Noto was freed from the fascist dictatorship of Benito Mussolini in July 1943 by British troops under General Bernard Montgomery as part of the opening phase of Operation Husky, the allied mission to liberate Sicily. The Notinesi people voted in favour of the monarchy in the referendum of 1946.

Scenes from the 2015 film By the Sea (starring Brad Pitt and Angelina Jolie) were filmed in Noto.

== Main sights ==
Noto is famous for its buildings from the early 18th century, many of which are considered to be among the finest examples of Sicilian baroque style. It is a place of many religious buildings and several palaces.

=== Palazzi and other buildings ===
- Palazzo Ducezio, the town hall. Designed by Vincenzo Sinatra, it houses neo-classical style frescos by Antonio Mazza.
- Palazzo Astuto
- Palazzo di Villadorata on via Nicolaci which was built by P. Labisi in 1733.
- Palazzo di Lorenzo del Castelluccio
- Town Library

=== Religious buildings ===
- Noto Cathedral (Cattedrale di San Nicolò di Mira, finished in 1776)
- Santa Agata church
- Sant'Andrea Apostolo church
- Anime Sante del Purgatorio ("Holy Souls of the Purgatory") church
- Annunziata church
- Sant'Antonio Abate church
- Santa Caterina church
- Santa Chiara church, with a precious Madonna (by Antonello Gagini), and Benedictine monastery
- Church of San Francesco d'Assisi (Immacolata)
- San Carlo al Corso church, designed by Rosario Gagliardi
- Collegio di San Carlo church
- San Corrado church
- Santissimo Crocifisso church
- Crociferio di San Camillo church
- San Domenico church by Rosario Gagliardi
- Ecce Homo church
- Sant'Egidio Vescovo church
- San Girolamo church also known as Chiesa di Montevergine
- Santa Maria dell'Arco: church and former Cistercian monastery, founded in 1212 under the patronage of Count Isimberto or Isemberto di Morengia and is wife Sara The church moved from Arco to the old Noto, then after 1693 to the new Noto. Church designed by Rosario Gagliardi. The monastery was closed by 1789, and little remains of the original structure.
- Santa Maria del Carmelo church
- Santa Maria del Gesù church
- Santa Maria della Rotonda church
- Santa Maria della Scala church
- San Michele Arcangelo church
- San Nicola di Mira church
- Sacro Nome di Gesu church
- San Pietro Martire church
- San Pietro delle Rose (Saints Peter and Paul) church
- Santissimo Salvatore church
- Santissimo Salvatore: church and benedictine convent (1735), designed by Gagliardi. It has an oval plant, the interior divided by twelve columns housing a Madonna with Child from the 16th century
- Spirito Santo church
- Santissima Trinità church

=== Archaeological sites ===
The remains of Noto's ancient structures are almost entirely hidden beneath the ruins of the mediaeval town, except for three chambers cut into the rock. An inscription in the Noto library says one belonged to a gymnasium while the other two were heroa (shrines of heroes). Explorations have discovered four cemeteries dating to the third Sicel period and one from the Greek period. Among other finds are catacombs of the Christian period and several Byzantine tombs.

About 6 kilometres (4 mi) south of Noto, on the left bank of the Tellaro (Helorus) river, stands a stone column about 10 metres (33 ft) high, which is believed to be a memorial to the surrender of Nicias. In the 3rd century BC, a tomb was excavated in the rectangular area around it, destroying an apparently preexisting tomb. Remnants of a later burial site belonging to the necropolis of the small town of Helorus, 750 metres (2,460 ft) to the southeast, have been discovered. The Villa Romana del Tellaro is a Roman villa south of Noto.

=== Nature reserves ===
Two nature reserves are near Noto: the Riserva naturale orientata Cavagrande del Cassibile, established in 1990, and the Riserva naturale orientata Oasi Faunistica di Vendicari, established in 1984.

== Culture ==
In the Noto neighbourhood, a 32-m radiotelescope was installed by the Istituto di Radioastronomia di Bologna as part of the Consiglio Nazionale delle Ricerche. It works in collaboration with a similar instrument in Medicina, Bologna.

The city has held an annual flower festival, the Infiorata, every May since the 1980s, lining the Corrado Nicolaci with floral mosaics.

One episode in the movie L'Avventura (1960) was shot in Noto and features views of its cathedral and square.

== Economy ==
The local area is home to several quality wine producers.

== Gallery ==
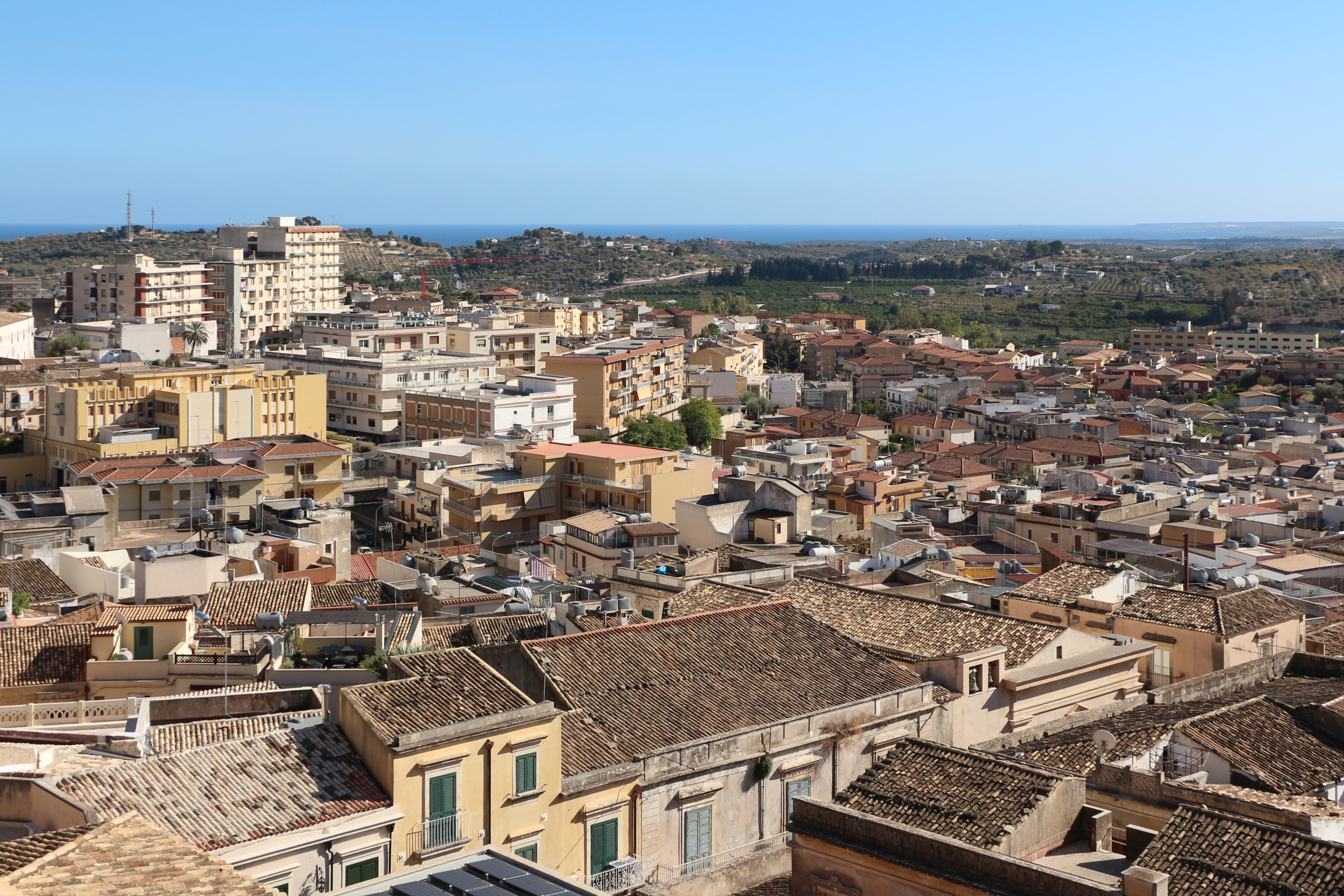
Cityscape of Noto

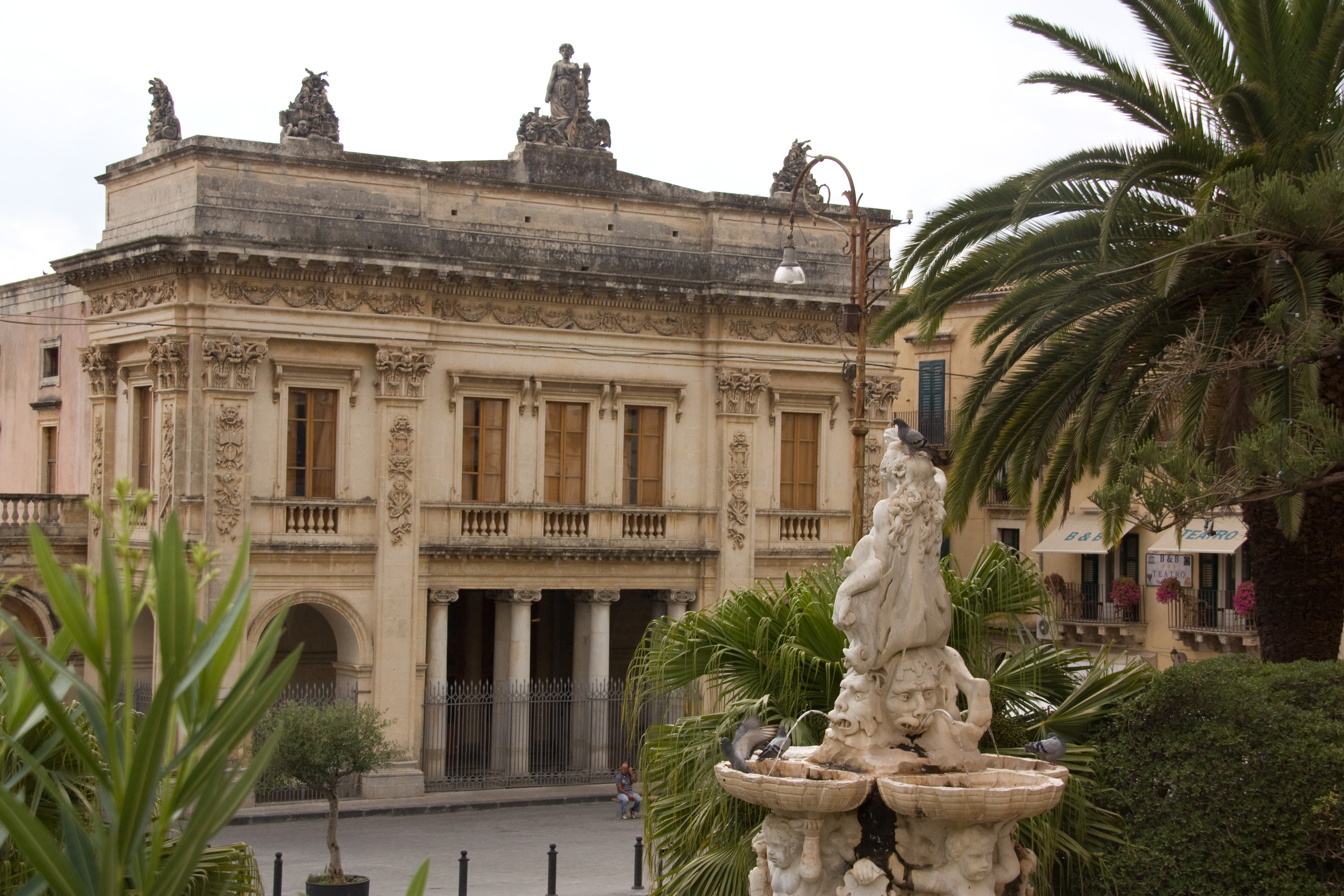
Theatre

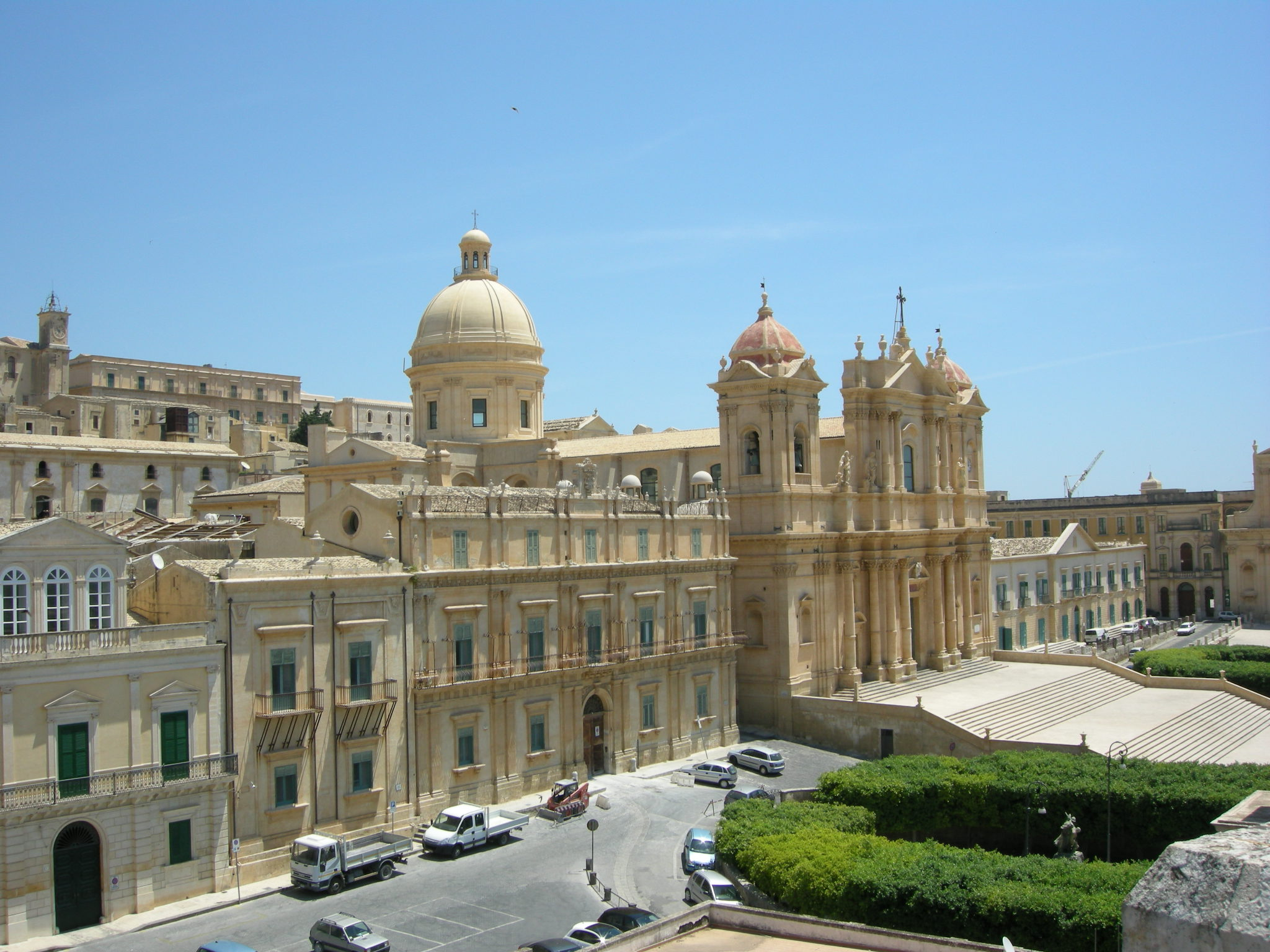
Noto Cathedral

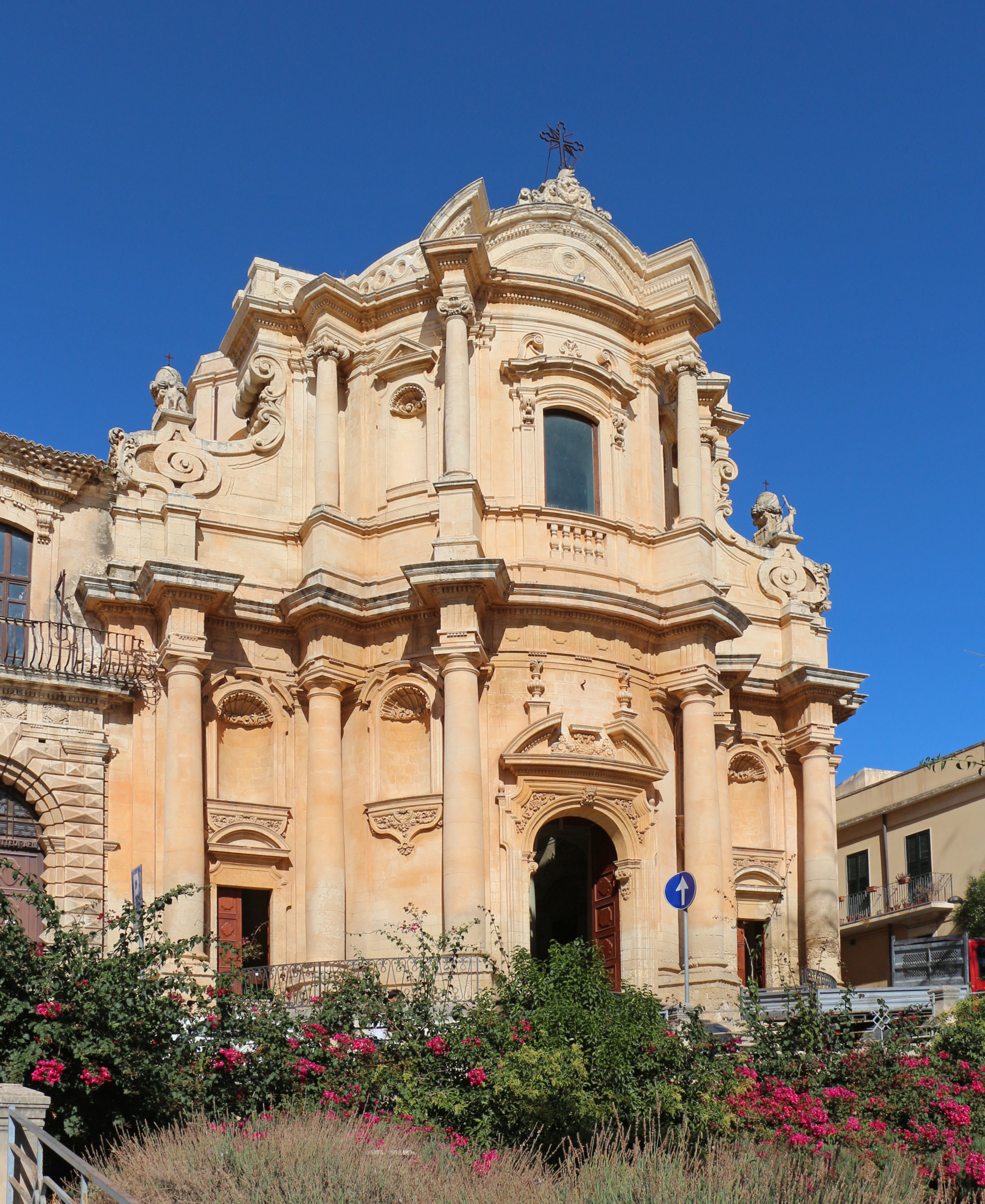
Church of San Domenico

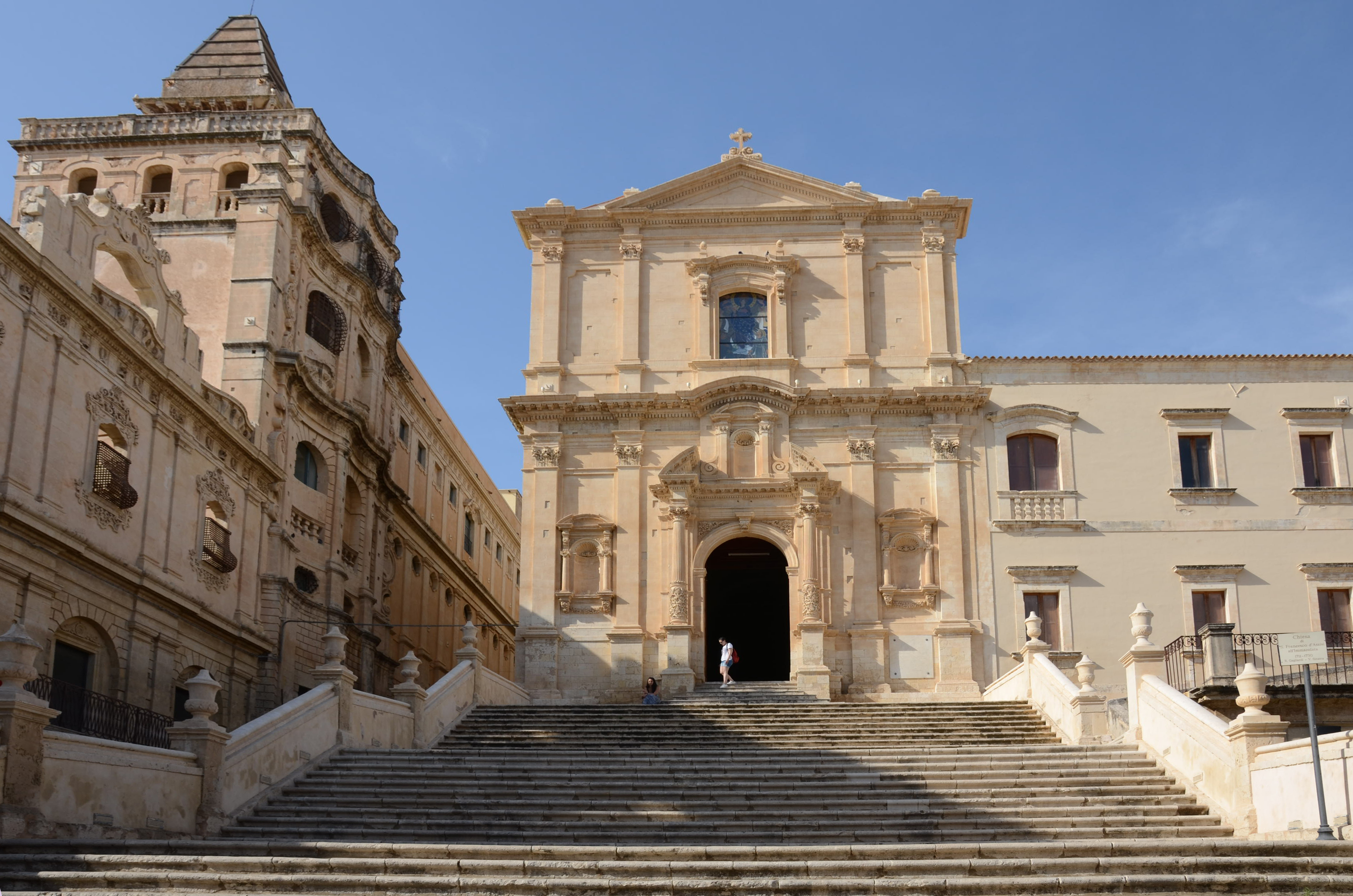
Church of San Francesco all'Immacolata

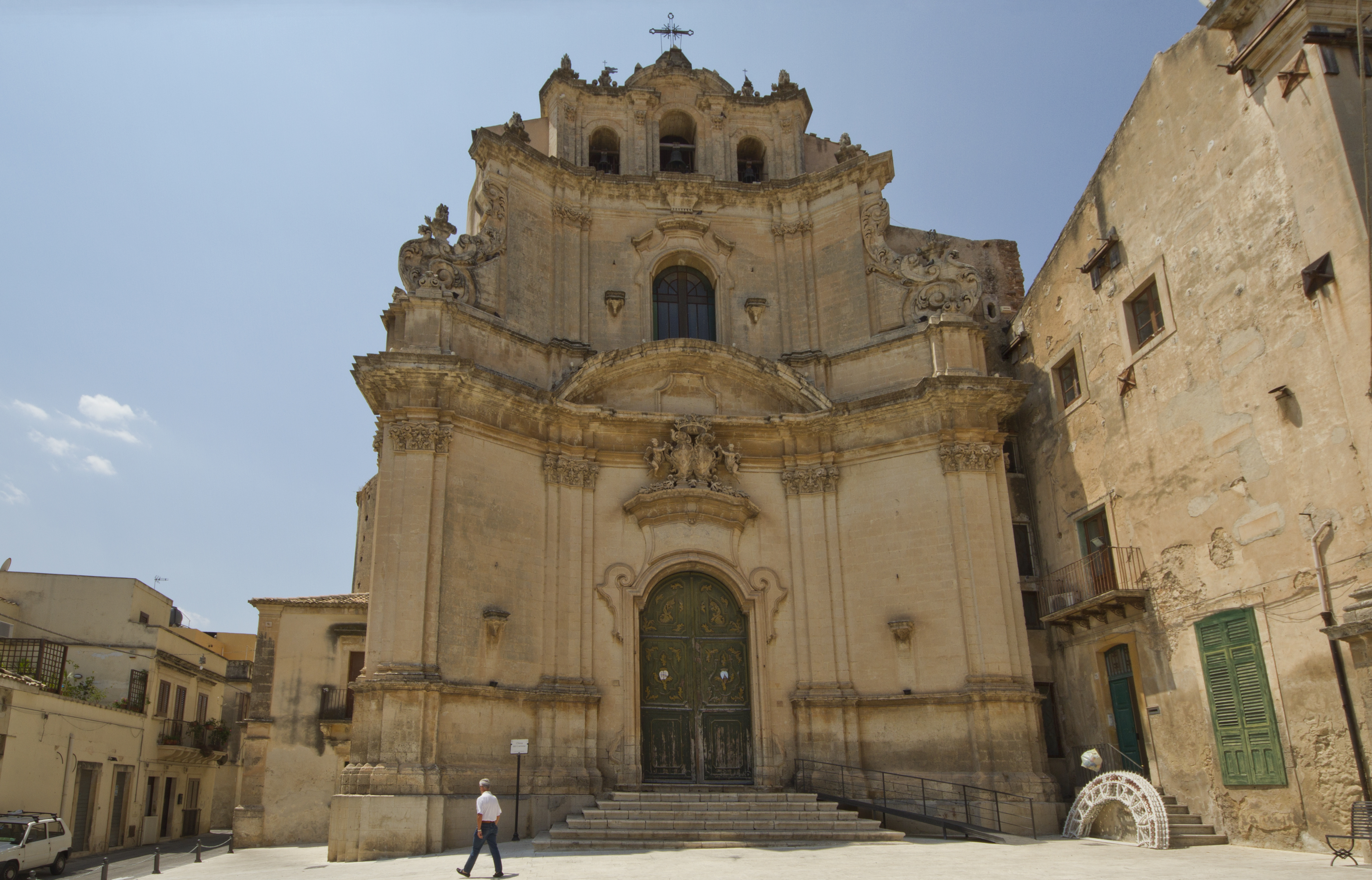
Church of the Carmine

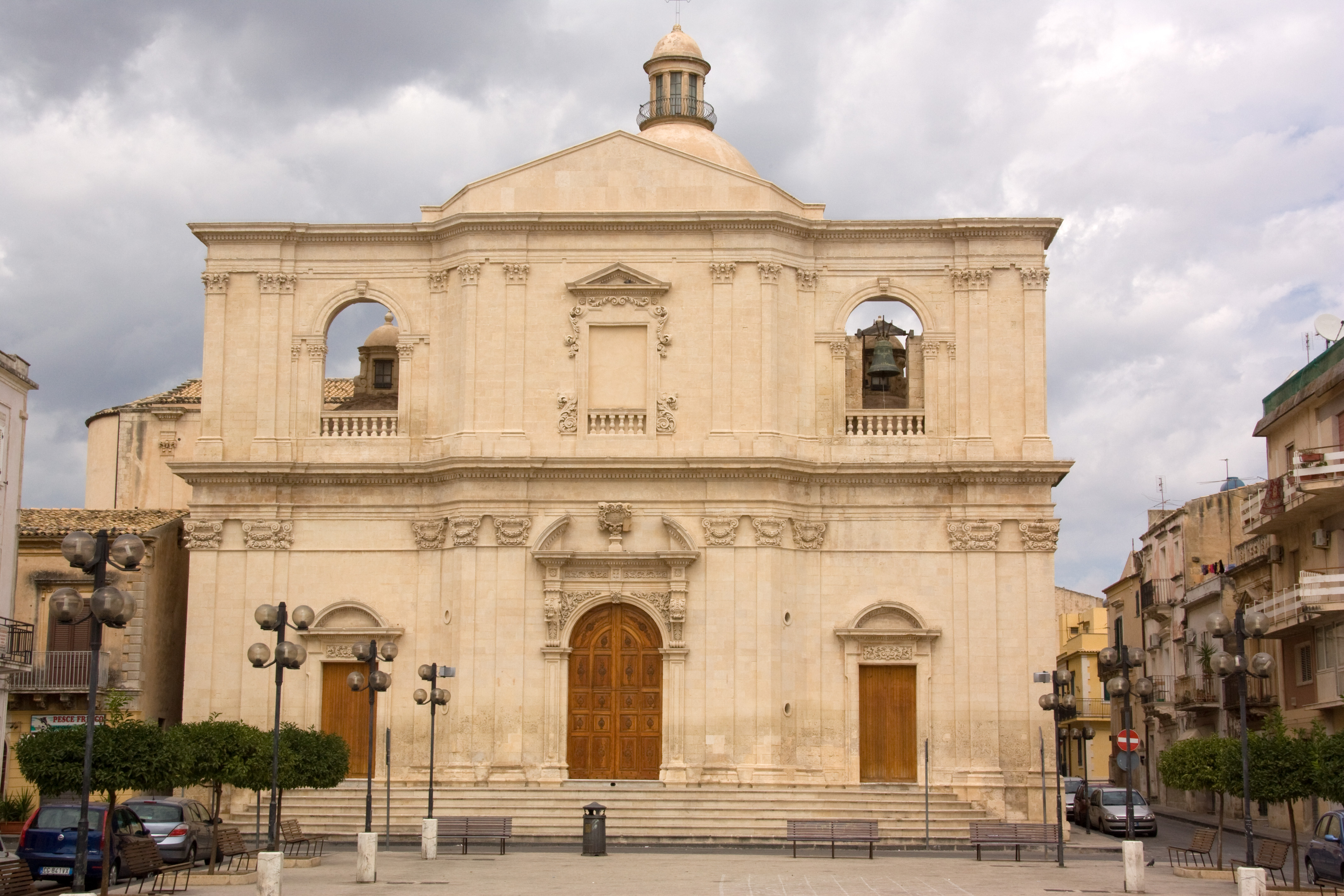
Church of the Santissimo Crocifisso

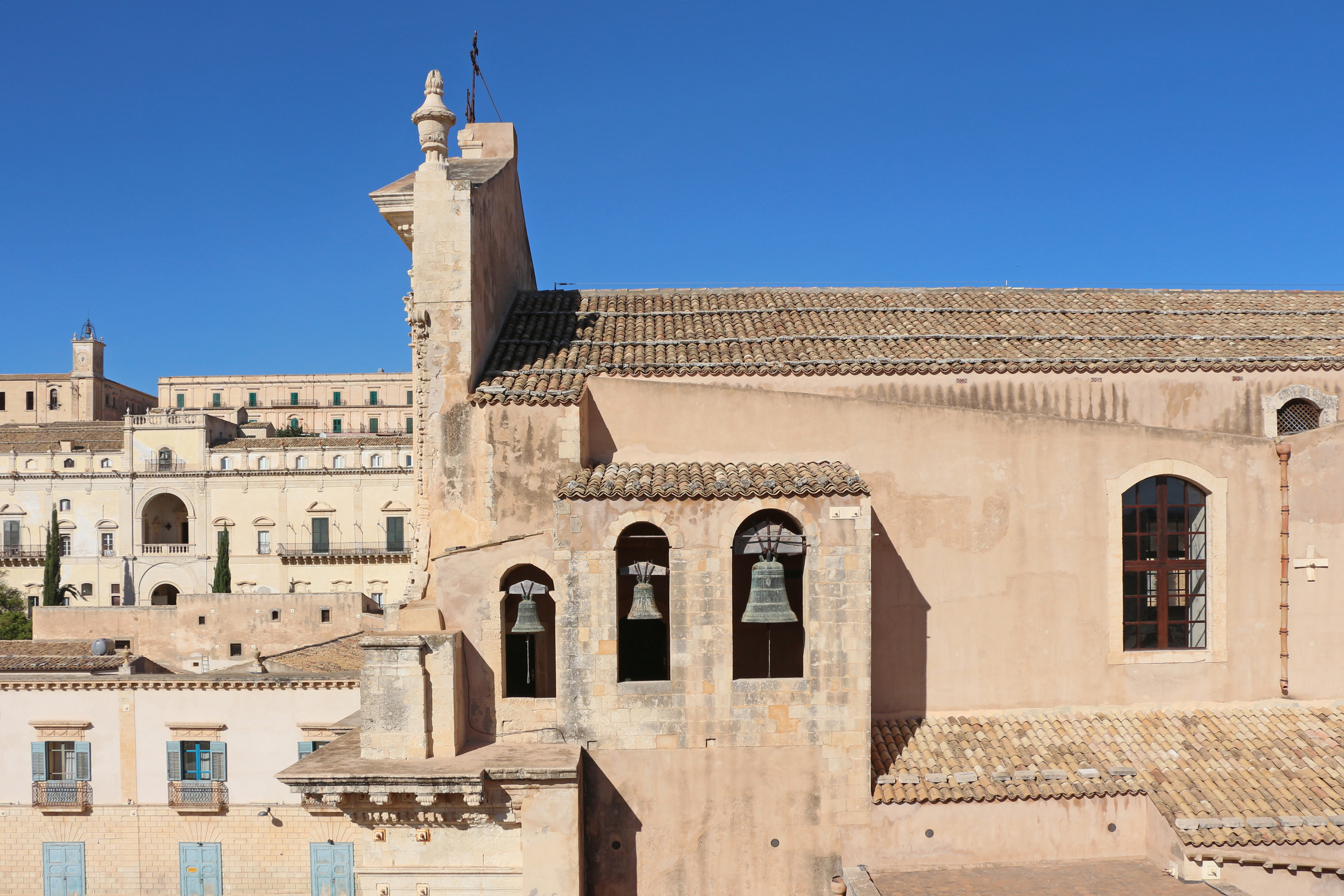
Church of Santissimo Salvatore

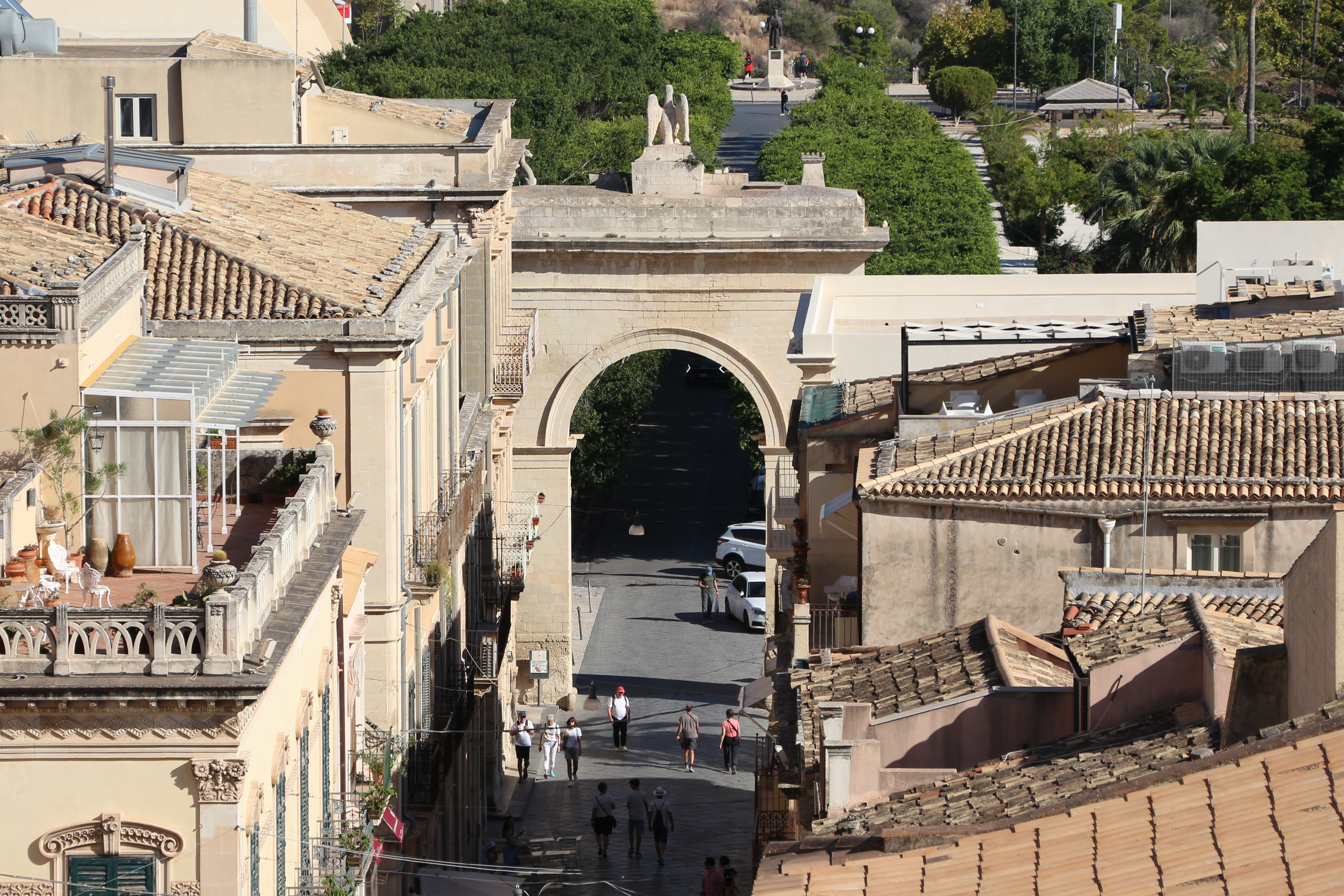
Porta Reale

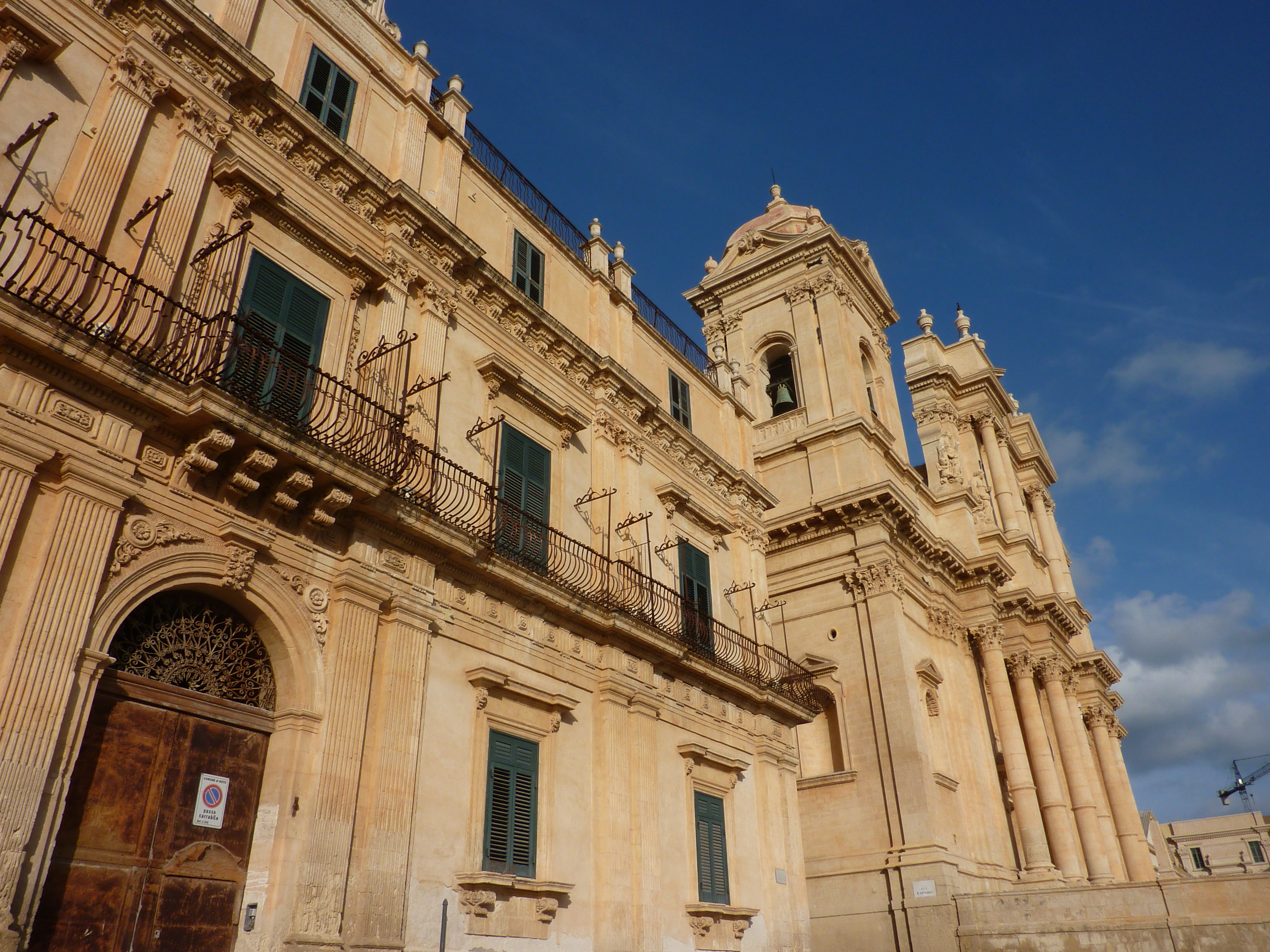
Palazzo Landolina

== See also ==
- Sicilian Baroque
- Val di Noto
- Roman Catholic Diocese of Noto
