= San Carlo al Corso, Noto =

Church building in Noto, Italy

Coordinates: 36°53′28″N 15°04′10″E

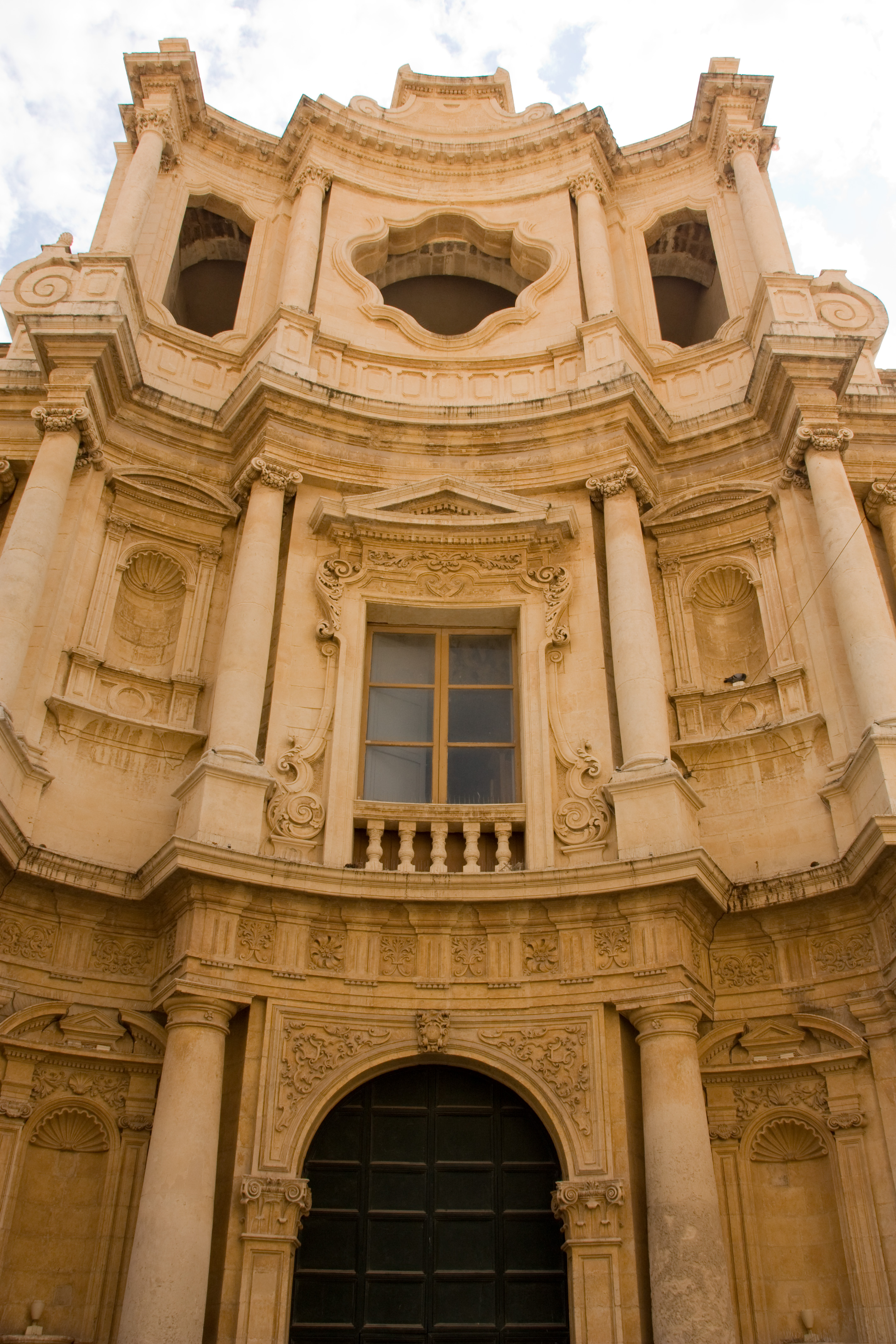
Detail of facade

San Carlo al Corso is a Baroque-style, Roman Catholic church located on Corso Vittorio Emanuele #119 in the town of Noto, region of Sicily, Italy. This is also known as the Collegiata or collegiate church due to the adjacent Jesuit seminary and monastery.

== History and description ==
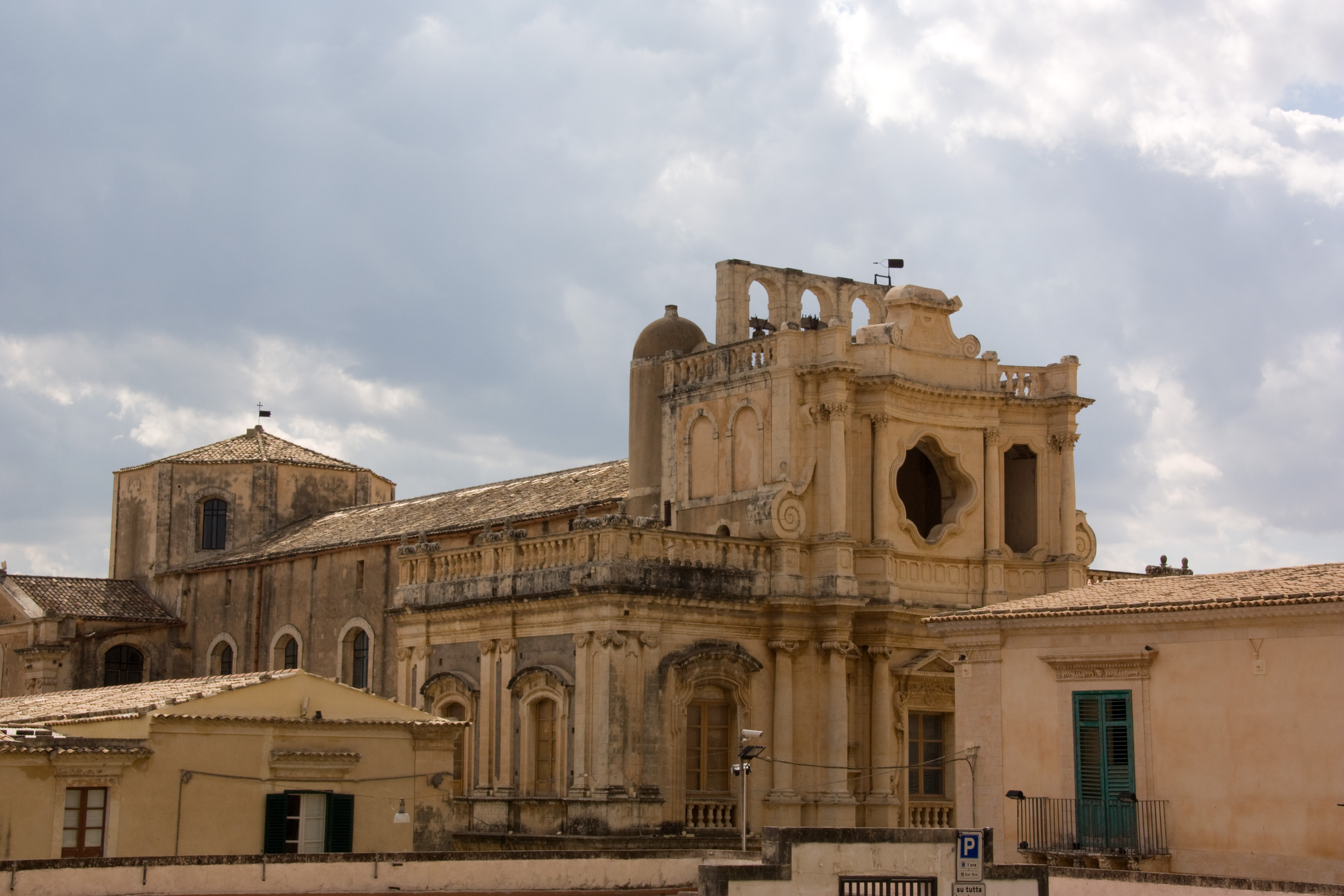
Church and dome from a distance

The present church, dedicated to San Carlo Borromeo, replaced an earlier church. This church likely designed by Rosario Gagliardi, was part of the town reconstruction after the 1693 Sicily earthquake.

The concave façade has three superimposed orders of columns, identified by their capitals from base to roofline as Doric, Ionic and Corinthian; in the progression expected in classical construction. The third story has floral oculus. The interior has a longitudinal layout with a barrel vault sustained by pilasters. The main altar was rescued from the prior church.

Inside the church, the 18th-century altarpieces display a Sacrifice of Isaac; a Flight into Egypt; a Deposition; San Carlo Borromeo ministering to those ill with the plague; a Virgin and Child with saints; Biblical Scene; St Ignatius of Loyola, founder of the Jesuit order; and wood icon of St Aloyitius Gonzaga, another Jesuit saint. The main altar is flanked by marble statues symbolizing Faith and Hope respectively, sculpted by Giuseppe Giuliano. The nave ceiling is frescoed by Costantino Carasi, depicting the Transfiguration and the Healing of the Paralytic, with a central panel depicting the Triumph of the Agnus Dei. The spandrels that support the dome are frescoed with the evangelists, and just below are four allegorical statues depicting the respective cardinal virtues: Temperance and Fortitude (on the right), Justice and Prudence (on the left).

== See also ==
- List of Jesuit sites
