= Helorus =

Ancient Greek city of Sicily

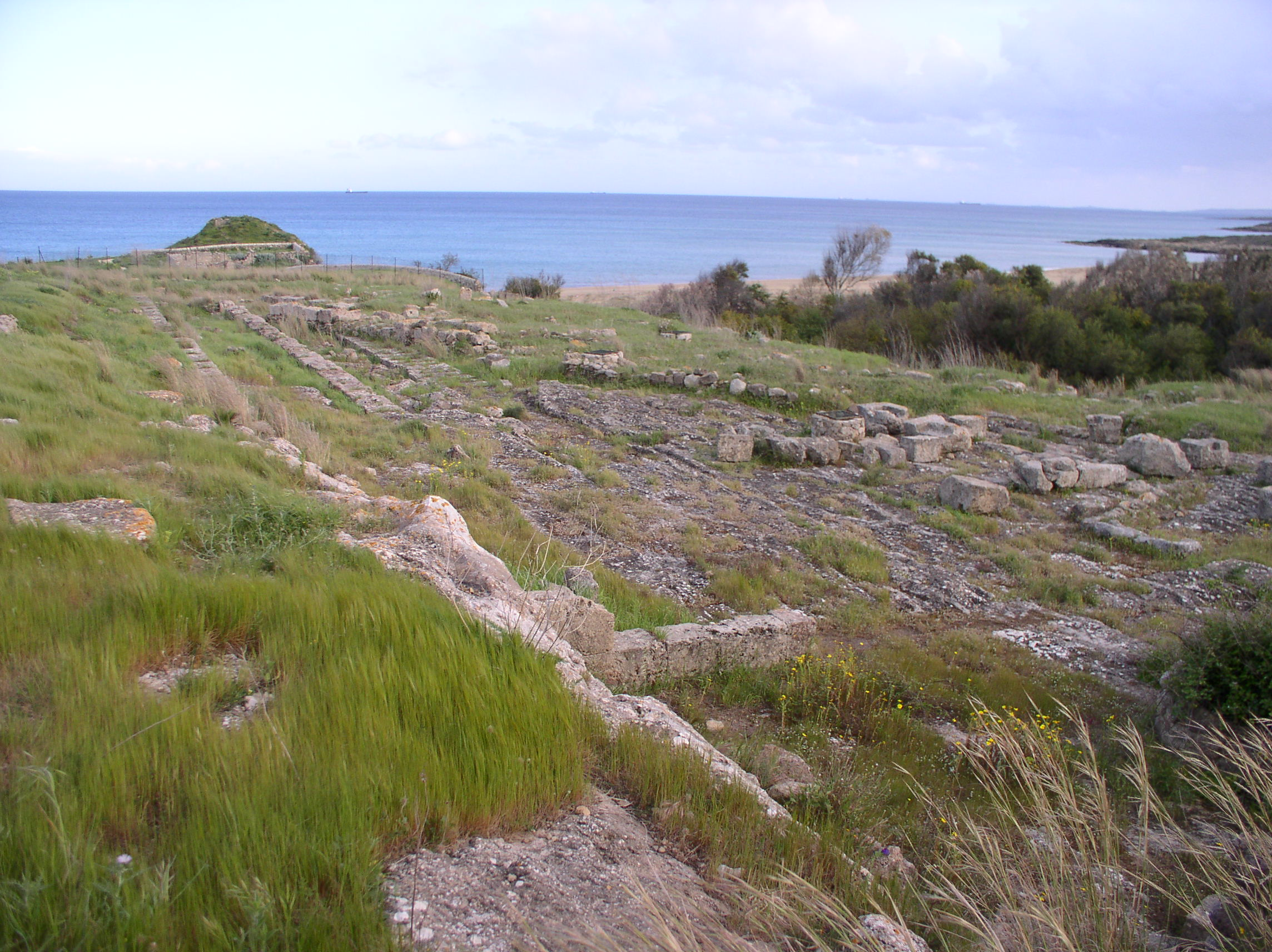
- The archaeological site of Helorus

- Location within Italy
- 36°50′32″N 15°06′34″E
- Satellite of: Syracuse
- Location: Noto, Province of Syracuse, Sicily, Italy

Helorus, Heloros, Helorum, or Elorus (Greek: Ἔλωρος or Ἕλωρος, Ptol., Steph. B. or Ἕλωρον, Scyl.; Italian: Eloro), was an ancient Greek city of Magna Graecia in Sicily, situated near the east coast, about 40 km south of Syracuse and on the banks of the river of the same name. It is currently an archaeological site in the modern comune of Noto.

== History ==
We have no account of its origin, but it was probably a colony of Syracuse, of which it appears to have continued always a dependency. The name is first found in Scylax; for, though Thucydides repeatedly mentions the road leading to Helorus from Syracuse, which was that followed by the Athenians in their disastrous retreat, he never speaks of the town itself. It was one of the cities which remained the under the government of Hieron II by the treaty concluded with him by the Romans, in 263 BC: and, having during the Second Punic War declared in favour of the Carthaginians, was recovered by Marcus Claudius Marcellus in 214 BC.

Under the Romans it appears to have been dependent on Syracuse, and had perhaps no separate municipal existence, though in a passage of Cicero it appears to be noticed as a civitas. Its name is again mentioned by the orator (Id. v. 34) as a maritime town where the squadron fitted out by Verres was attacked by pirates: but it does not occur in Pliny's list of the towns of Sicily; though he elsewhere mentions it as a castellum on the river of the same name: and Ptolemy speaks of a city of Helorus.

== The site ==
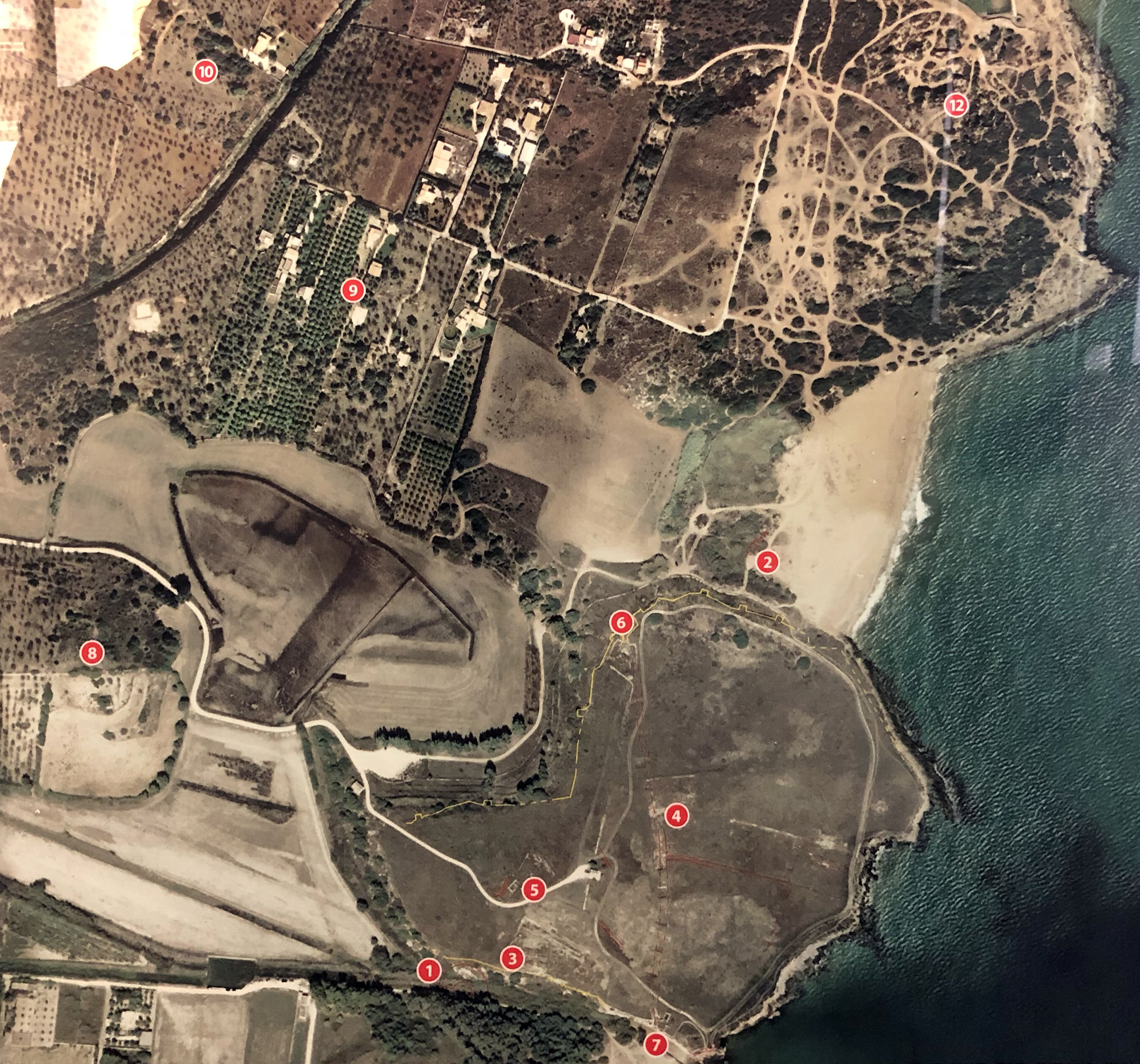
Aerial view of Heloros: 1. theatre 3. Sanctuary of Demeter and Kore 4. Agora 5. Asklepieion 6. north gate 7. south gate 8. Necropoli A 9. Necropoli D 10. Necropoli C 11. Necropoli B 12. Latomie 13. colomn Pizzuta

Its ruins were still visible in the days of Fazello; a little to the north of the river Helorus, and about a mile from the sea-coast. The most conspicuous of them were the remains of a theatre, called by the country people Colisseo: but great part of the walls and other buildings could be traced. The extent of them was, however, inconsiderable.

Today the impressive walls, with square bastions, of large ashlars without mortar are visible in some places. The theatre and agora and several other buildings can be seen.

The sanctuary of Demeter and Kore dating from the second half of the 4th c. BC has been excavated on the shore north of the city, just outside city walls. The sanctuary flourished from the archaic to the Hellenistic period as shown by the rich votive offerings.

== See also ==
- List of ancient Greek cities
- Heloris
