= Mount Alveria =

Mountain in Italy

Coordinates: 36°56′04″N 15°01′11″E

Mount Alveria is a mountain located in the Province of Siracusa, south-eastern Sicily, Italy.

== History ==
This mountainside has been inhabited since prehistoric times. The Elymians lived there before the 10th century B.C. They were followed by the Sicani and then the Siculians. Many Bronze Age artifacts have been found in this locality. One of the oldest archeological sites in the area is the Necropolis of Castelluccio thought to date from the 17th-15th centuries BC. The Roman Villa of Tellaro has also been excavated on Mount Alveria.

Mount Alveria was the original site of the city of Noto. Noto was relocated to a more level site 10 kilometres away after the earthquake of 1693. The ruins of the old city of Noto, known today as Noto Antica, still remain on a ridge on the mountainside.
