= Tellaro (river) =

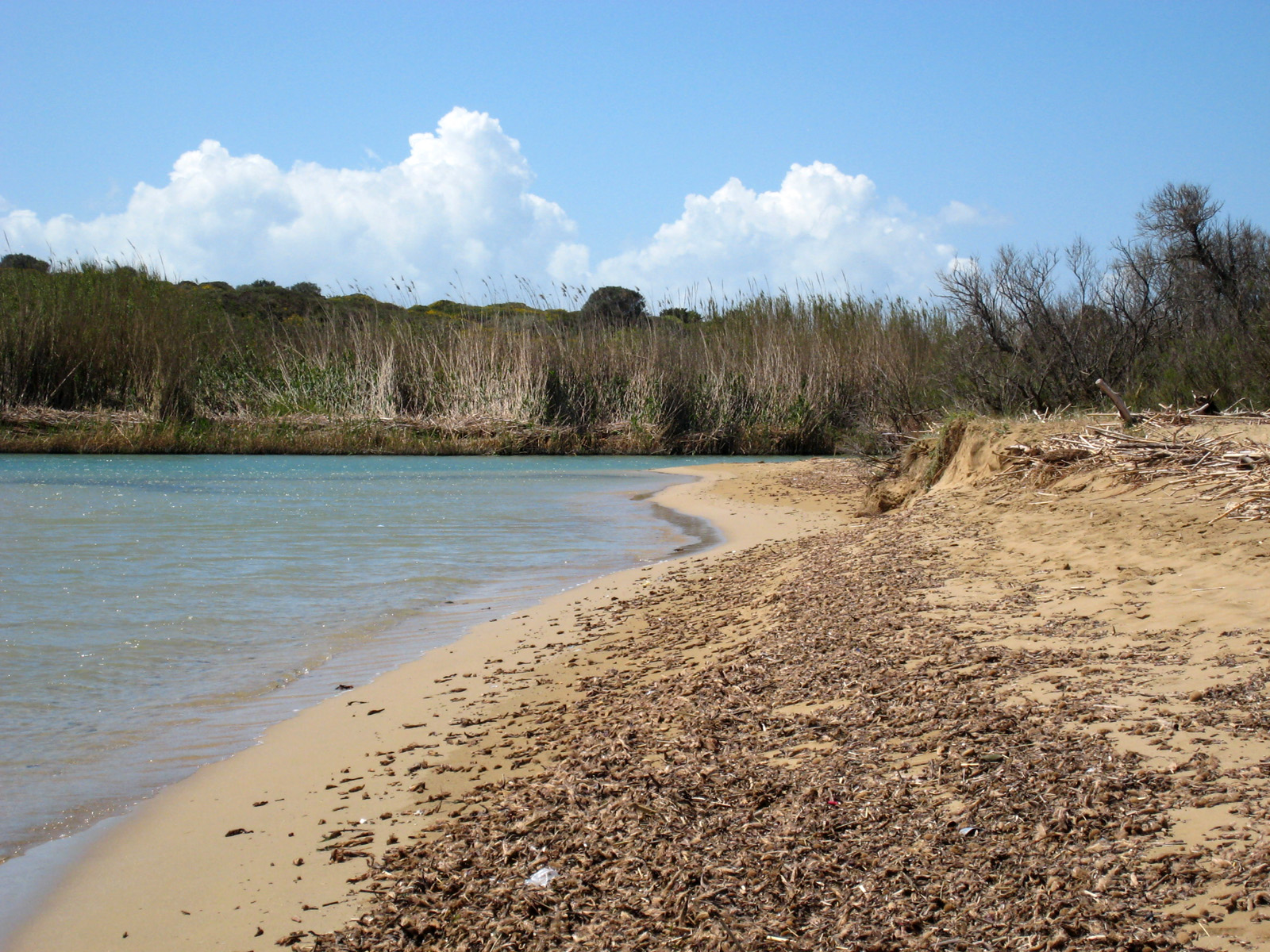

Location
- Country: Italy
- Region: Sicily

Physical characteristics
- Mouth: Ionian Sea
  - coordinates: 36.8373°N 15.1064°E
- Length: 49 km (30 mi)
- Basin size: 384 km^{2} (148 sq mi)

The Tellaro (Latin: Helorus or Elorus, Greek: Ἕλωρος or Ἕλωρος) is a river in the southeast of Sicily, the most considerable which occurs between Syracuse and Cape Pachynum. It is 49 kilometres (30 mi) long, and has a drainage basin of 384 square kilometres (148 sq mi).

It rises in the hills between Palazzolo (ancient Acrae) and Giarratana, and flows at first to the south, then turns eastward, and enters the sea about 40 kilometres (25 mi) south of Syracuse. Near its mouth stood the town of the same name. In the upper part of its course it is a mountain stream, flowing over a rugged and rocky bed, whence Silius Italicus calls it undae clamosus Helorus (xiv. 269); but near its mouth it becomes almost perfectly stagnant, and liable to frequent inundations. Hence Virgil justly speaks of praepingue solum stagnantis Helori (Aen. iii. 698). Ovid praises the beauty of the valley through which it flows, which he terms Helornia Tempe (Fast. iv. 476). Several ancient authors mention that the stagnant pools at the mouth of the river abounded in fish, which were said to be so tame that they would eat out of the hand, in the same manner as was afterwards not uncommon in the fishponds of the Romans. (Apollodorus of Athens ap. Steph. Byz. v. Ἔλωρος; Athenaeus, viii. p. 331; Plin. xxxii. 2. s. 7.)

It was on the banks of the Helorus, at a spot called Ἀρέας πόρος the precise locality of which cannot be determined, that the Syracusans were defeated by Hippocrates, tyrant of Gela, in a great battle. (Herod. vii. 154; Pind. Nem. ix. 95; and Schol. ad loc.)
