= Sclafani =

Sclafani may refer to:

- Sclafani (surname), Italian surname
- Sclafani Bagni, comune in the Metropolitan City of Palermo in the Italian region Sicily
- Sclafani Foods, importer of Italian specialty foods, based in Norwalk, Connecticut, USA
- Chiusa Sclafani, comune in the Metropolitan City of Palermo in the Italian region Sicily
- House of Sclafani, Italian noble family
- Palazzo Sclafani, palace in Palermo, Italian region Sicily
