= Ferry de Clugny =

His Eminence Ferry de Clugny
- Bishop of Tournai
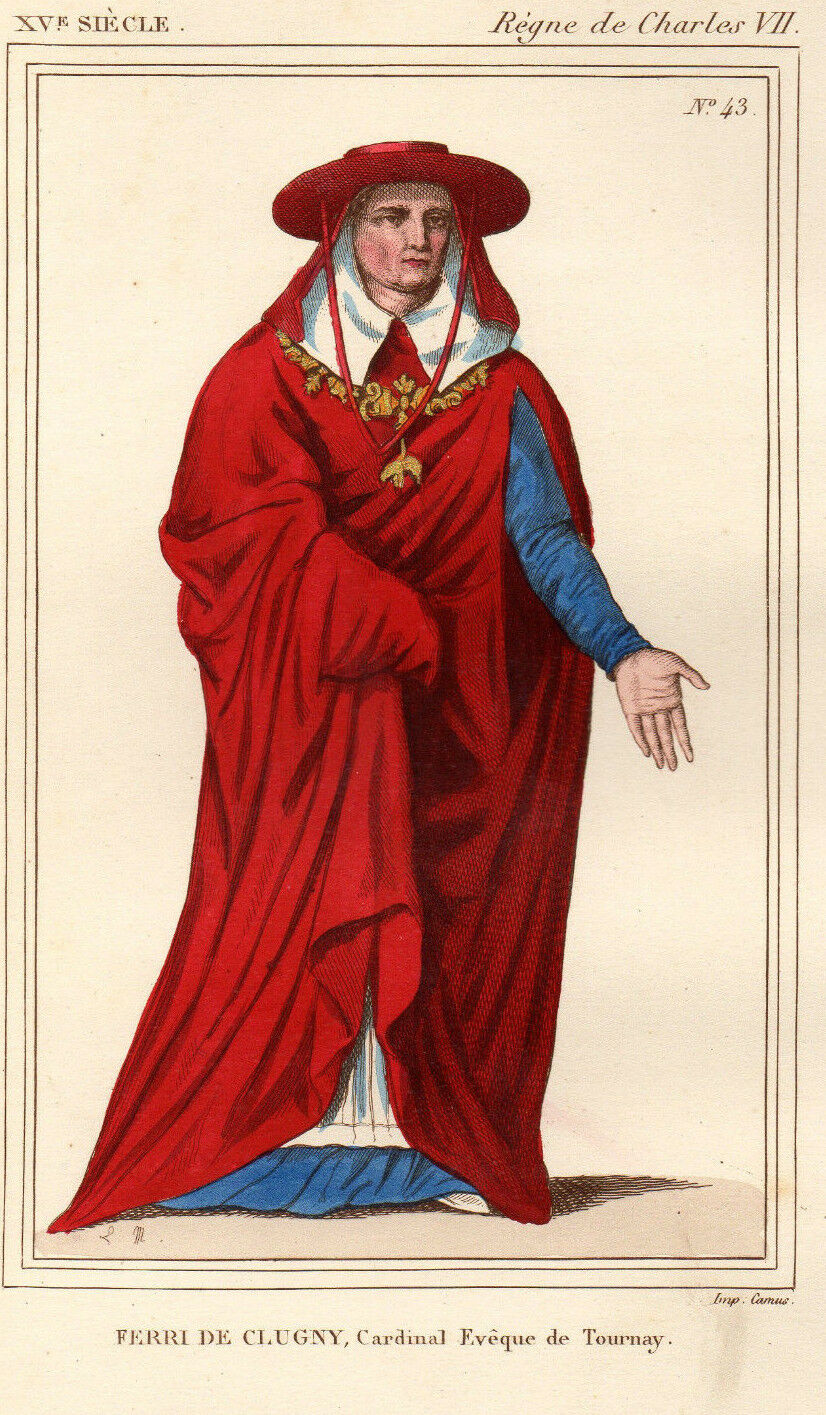
- Church: Catholic Church
- Diocese: Diocese of Tournai
- Installed: 8 October 1473
- Term ended: 7 October 1483
- Predecessor: Guillaume Fillastre
- Successor: Charles de Hautbois (1505)

Orders
- Created cardinal: 15 May 1480 by Pope Sixtus IV
- Rank: Cardinal-Priest

Personal details
- Born: Ferry de Clugny; 1430 Autun, France
- Died: 7 October 1483 (aged 52–53) Rome, Papal States

Ferry de Clugny, Cardinal and Bishop of Tournai (Autun ca. 1430 – Rome 7 October 1483) was a highly placed statesman and ecclesiastic in the service of the Dukes of Burgundy.

He was born at Autun, Burgundy, of a distinguished house that produced the marquises of Montlyon and Raigny. He was the eldest son of Henri de Clugny, seigneur of Conforgien and Joursenvault, a councillor of Jean sans Peur, duke of Burgundy, and his wife, Pierrette Coullot. At the University of Bologna he obtained a doctorate utroque iure, in both civil (Roman) and canon law.

== Councillor and statesman in Burgundy ==
While still a young man he was a member of the grand council of Philip the Good, the reigning duke of Burgundy, and a maître des requêts in the ducal court. Asked by the duke to assist, representing the clergy, in reducing to writing the customary law of Burgundy, he was sent instead as ambassador on several occasions, notably to Pope Callixtus III (in 1456 with Geoffroy de Thoisy, seigneur de Mimeure) and with the duke of Cleves, to the Council of Mantua (1459), convoked by Pope Pius II, who was engaged in planning war against the Turks. Clugny obtained from Pius confirmation of the Treaty of Arras (1435) and of the acts of Pope Eugenius IV and his successors. Duke Philip agreed to promote him to the see of Autun or see of Mâcon, whichever became vacant first. Lieutenant of the chancellor of Bourgogne at the see of Autun, 2 December 1459. He was named Apostolic Protonotary.

He was one of the three Burgundian ambassadors sent to Louis XI of France in Melun in January 1465. After Philip's death, he was entrusted by the new duke of Burgundy, Charles the Bold, to negotiate the Treaty of Péronne (1468), to treat with Louis again at Noyon, and in 1473 to negotiate the Treaty of Senlis. He headed the Duke's grand council from 29 May 1473, and was named Chancellor of the Order of the Golden Fleece the following 15 September.

With the death of Charles the Bold, 5 January 1477, Maximilian received the vast Burgundian inheritance by right of his wife. In the transfer of power to the Habsburg, Ferry de Clugny was confirmed in his positions, including that of Chancellor of the Golden Fleece (10 December 1477), where he guided the new sovereign of the order, and as councillor.

== Abbacies in commendam ==
Like all major prelates of the time, he held multiple abbacies in commendam, which supported him in his official capacities in a manner befitting his rank. Not all these benefices came to him easily: though he was elected bishop of Cavaillon by its cathedral chapter in 1467, the election was never confirmed, and in 1468, he was unsuccessful in getting appointed dean by the chapter of Amiens. Later, he was provost of the collegiate church of Saint-Barthélemy de Béthune, canon of the cathedral chapter of Cambrai, and archdeacon of Ardennes in Liège.

== Patronage ==
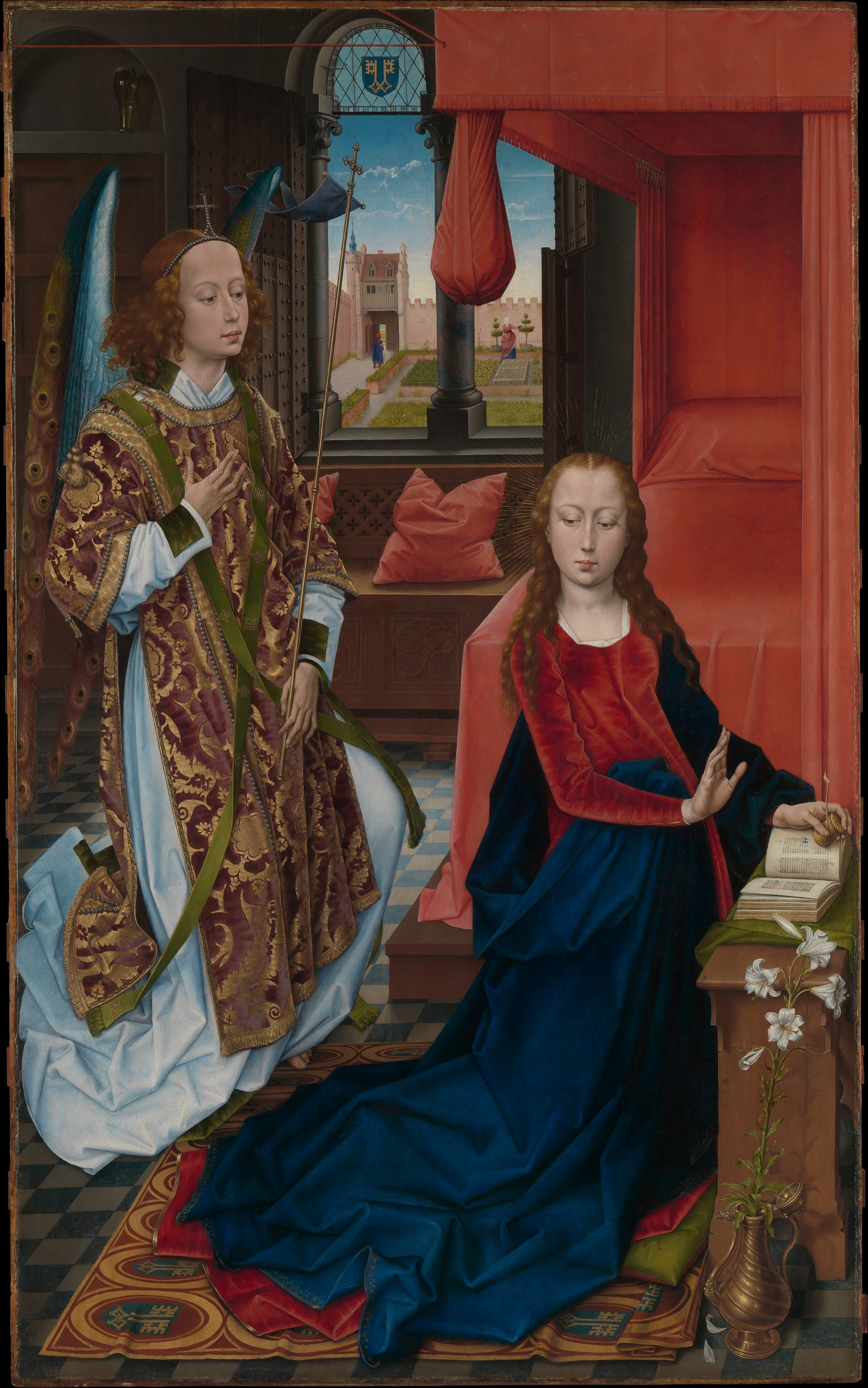
Annunciation commissioned by Ferry de Clugny, 1465–75, workshop of Rogier van der Weyden, possibly by Hans Memling

His patronage of the arts must be assessed by a handful of survivals. On 7 November 1465, he obtained permission from the cathedral chapter of Autun, where he was a canon, to have a chapel built to be his sepulchre; it is called the Chapelle Dorée from the profusion of its gilding. For its painted walls he commissioned Pierre Spicre to provide figures of four Old Testament patriarchs, the four Evangelists and four doctors of the Church. In the Annunciation attributed to Rogier van der Weyden or one of his disciples, Hans Memling, that is now at the Metropolitan Museum of Art, Ferry de Clugny's arms appear in the carpet and in the stained glass above the Virgin's head; it too must have been commissioned by him. At Bruges he commissioned from the illuminators Loyset Liéder and Liévin van Latham a richly illuminated pontifical with 95 miniatures and rinceau borders. He commissioned a suite of at least ten Franco-Flemish tapestry hangings of Illustrious Women, figuring among many armorials his arms and the cardinal's hat; eight fragmentary remains that survived the burning of the Château de Thénisset in 1791 are now at the Museum of Fine Arts, Boston.

== Bishop of Tournai ==
Between 1410 and 1483 four presidents of the great council of Burgundy succeeded one another as bishops of Tournai: Jehan de Thoisy, Jehan Chevrot, Guillaume Fillastre, and Ferry de Clugny. Following the death of Fillastre, Clugny was elected 8 October 1473, with the consent of Louis XI, as was the king's right; he took possession the following 22 March and occupied the see until his death. In January 1484, in Brussels, he baptised Marguerite, daughter of Archduke Maximilian, future Holy Roman Emperor, and Marie, the heiress of Burgundy.

== To Rome ==
Clugny was created cardinal in secret by Pope Paul II in May or June 1471; the creation was not published because of the unexpected death of the Pope. He was publicly created cardinal priest in his absence, in the consistory of 15 May 1480. He arrived from Flanders in Rome with his household, which included the composer Marbrianus de Orto, 3 June 1482. On 10 June, he was received by the pope, who gave him the red hat. On 7 October 1483 he died suddenly, of a stroke; on the following day, he was buried in the church of Santa Maria del Popolo, far from the Clugny chapel that he had prepared at Autun.
