= The Triumph of Death =

Painting by Pieter Bruegel the Elder

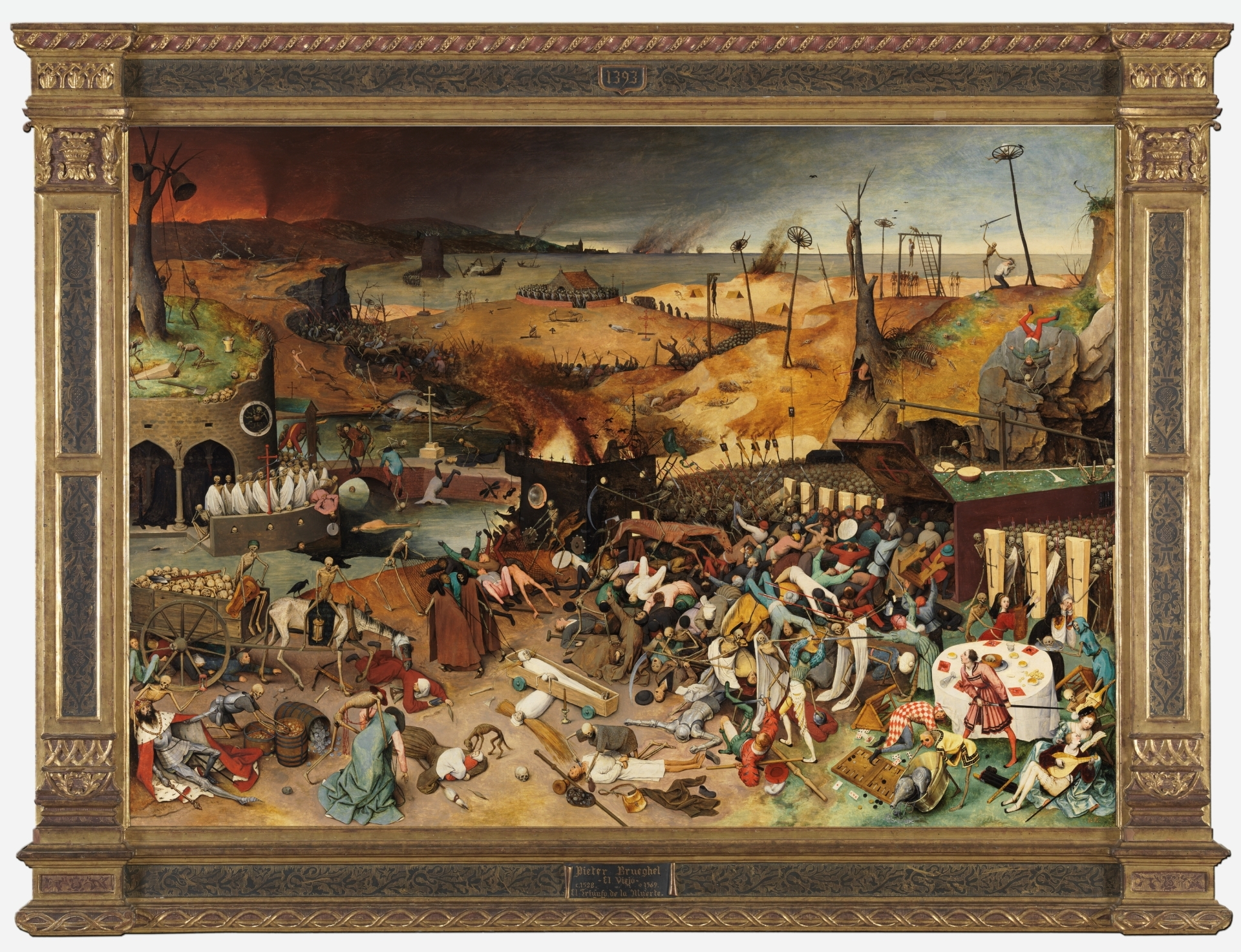
- Artist: Pieter Bruegel the Elder
- Year: c. 1562
- Medium: oil on panel
- Dimensions: 117 cm × 162 cm (46 in × 63.8 in)
- Location: Museo del Prado, Madrid

The Triumph of Death is an oil panel painting by Pieter Bruegel the Elder painted c. 1562. It has been in the Museo del Prado in Madrid since 1827.

This painting is part of the BBC's 100 Great Paintings.

== Description ==
The painting shows a panorama of an army of skeletons wreaking havoc across a blackened, desolate landscape. Fires burn in the distance, and the sea is littered with shipwrecks.

A few leafless trees stud hills otherwise bare of vegetation. Fish lie rotting on the shores of a corpse-choked pond. Art historian James Snyder emphasizes the "scorched, barren earth, devoid of any life as far as the eye can see."

In this setting, legions of skeletons advance on the living, who either flee in terror or try in vain to fight back. In the foreground, skeletons haul a wagon full of skulls. In the upper left corner, others ring the bell that signifies the death knell of the world. People are herded into a coffin-shaped trap decorated with crosses, while skeletons, some on horseback, kill people with scythes. The horse-riding skeletons probably allude to the Four Horsemen of the Apocalypse. The painting depicts people of different social backgrounds – from peasants and soldiers to nobles as well as a king and a cardinal – being taken by death indiscriminately.

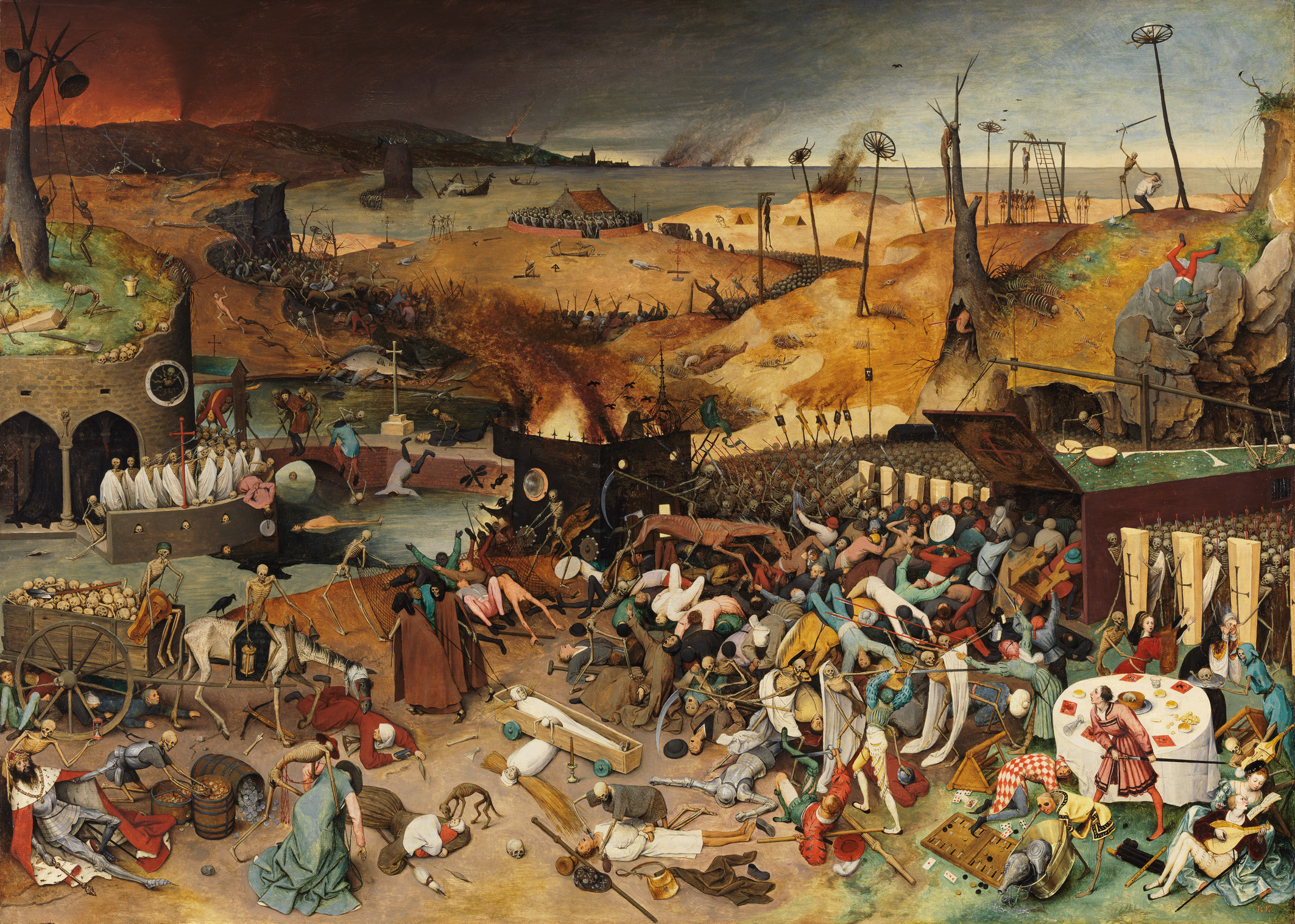
The Triumph of Death by Pieter Bruegel the Elder. 1562 (Museo del Prado)

A skeleton parodies human happiness by playing a hurdy-gurdy, while the wheels of his cart crush a man as if his life is of no importance. A woman has fallen in the path of the death cart. She has a slender thread which is about to be cut by the scissors in her other hand—Bruegel's interpretation of Atropos. Nearby, another woman in the path of the cart holds in her hand a spindle and distaff, classical symbols of the fragility of human life—another Bruegel interpretation of Clotho and Lachesis.

A starving dog nibbles at the face of a dead child lying still within its dead mother's embrace. Just beside her, a cardinal is helped towards his fate by a skeleton who mockingly wears the red hat, while a dying king's barrels of gold and silver coins are looted by yet another skeleton, oblivious to the fact that a skeleton is warning him with an empty hourglass that his life is about to literally run out of time. The foolish and miserly monarch's last thoughts still compel him to reach out for his useless and vain wealth, seeming unaware of the need for repentance. In the centre, an awakening religious pilgrim has his throat cut by a robber-skeleton for his money purse. Above the murder, skeleton-fishermen catch people in a net.

In the bottom right-hand corner, a dinner has been broken up and the diners are putting up a futile resistance. They have drawn their swords in order to fight the skeletons dressed in winding-sheets. No less hopelessly, the court jester takes refuge beneath the dinner table. The backgammon board and the playing cards have been scattered, while a skeleton thinly disguised with a mask (possibly the face of a corpse) empties away the wine flasks. Of the menu of the interrupted meal, all that can be seen are a few pallid rolls of bread and an appetiser apparently consisting of a pared human skull. Above the table are two women. The one on the left struggles in vain while being embraced by a skeleton, in a hideous parody of after-dinner amorousness. The woman on the right is horrified with the realisation of mortality when a skeleton in a hooded robe mockingly seems to bring another dish, also consisting of human bones, to the table.

In the bottom right-hand corner, a musician plays a lute while his lady sings. Both are oblivious to the fact that, behind both of them, the skeleton that plays along is grimly aware that the couple can not escape their inevitable doom. A cross sits in the centre of the painting. The painting shows aspects of everyday life in the mid-sixteenth century, when the risk of plague was very severe. Clothes are clearly depicted, as are pastimes such as playing cards and backgammon. It shows objects such as musical instruments, an early mechanical clock, scenes including a funeral service, and various methods of execution, including the breaking wheel, the gallows, burning at the stake, and the headsman about to behead a victim who has just taken wine and communion. In one scene, a human is the prey of a skeleton-hunter and his dogs.

In another scene at the left, skeletons drag victims down to be drowned in a pond. A man with a grinding stone around his neck is about to be thrown into the pond by the skeletons—an echoing of Matthew 18.6 and Luke 17.2. On the bridge just above at the right, a skeleton is about to strike a prostrate victim with a falchion.

Bruegel combines two distinct visual traditions within the panel. These represent both the native tradition of Northern woodcuts of the Dance of Death, and the Italian conception of the Triumph of Death. Classic examples of his frescoes can now be seen in the Palazzo Sclafani in Palermo and in the Camposanto Monumentale at Pisa.

== Copies ==
Pieter Bruegel the Elder’s original The Triumph of Death was copied and interpreted by several successors within his family. So far, five copies are known: One by Jan Brueghel the Elder, three by Pieter Brueghel the Younger and one by Jan Brueghel the Younger. All versions feature the same motif and pictorial composition; however, they differ in painting style and in numerous minor details, such as the clothing styles and colours worn by the figures depicted. Close examination of the copies suggests that the artists did not work directly from the original painting but instead created their versions by tracing and painting based on sketches from Pieter Bruegel the Elder’s estate. Comparisons of the works indicate that the now lost sketch most likely spanned over two sheets of paper. Notably, in the case of Jan Brueghel the Elder’s painting in Graz and Pieter Brueghel the Younger’s work in Basel, the motifs derived from the reconstructed preliminary drawings align perfectly on the left side but are offset on the opposite side, and vice versa. Some of the later copies adhere more closely to details that Pieter Bruegel the Elder had originally sketched but subsequently discarded during the painting process, since the copyists did not have the original painting before them, which accounts for the variations in depicted details and colour choices.

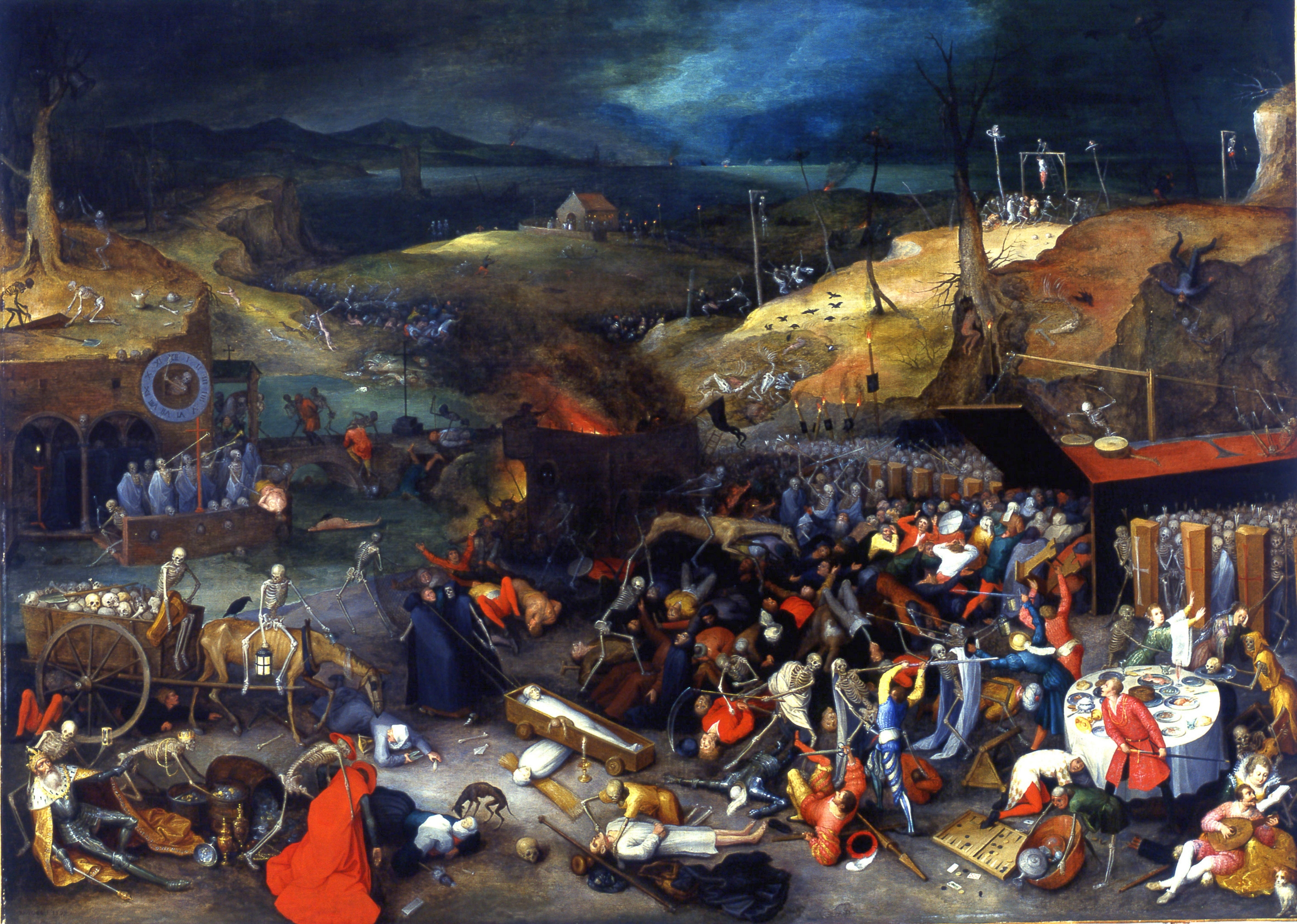
1597 version of The Triumph of Death by Jan Brueghel the Younger (Eggenberg Palace, Graz)

1608 (?) version of The Triumph of Death attributed to Pieter Bruegel the Younger (Kunstmuseum Basel)

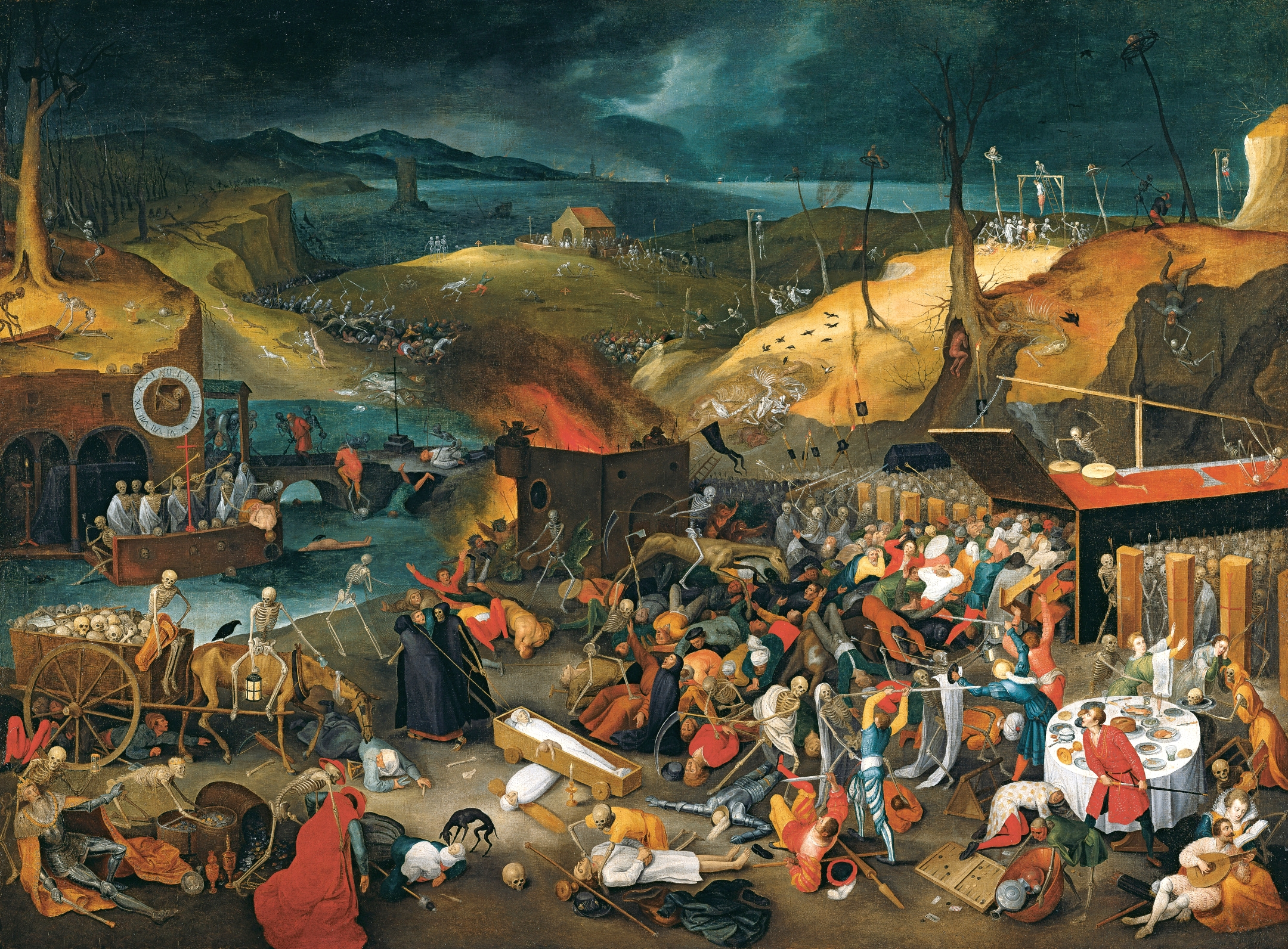
Jan Brueghel the Younger, 1620 (Princely Collection of the House of Liechtenstein)

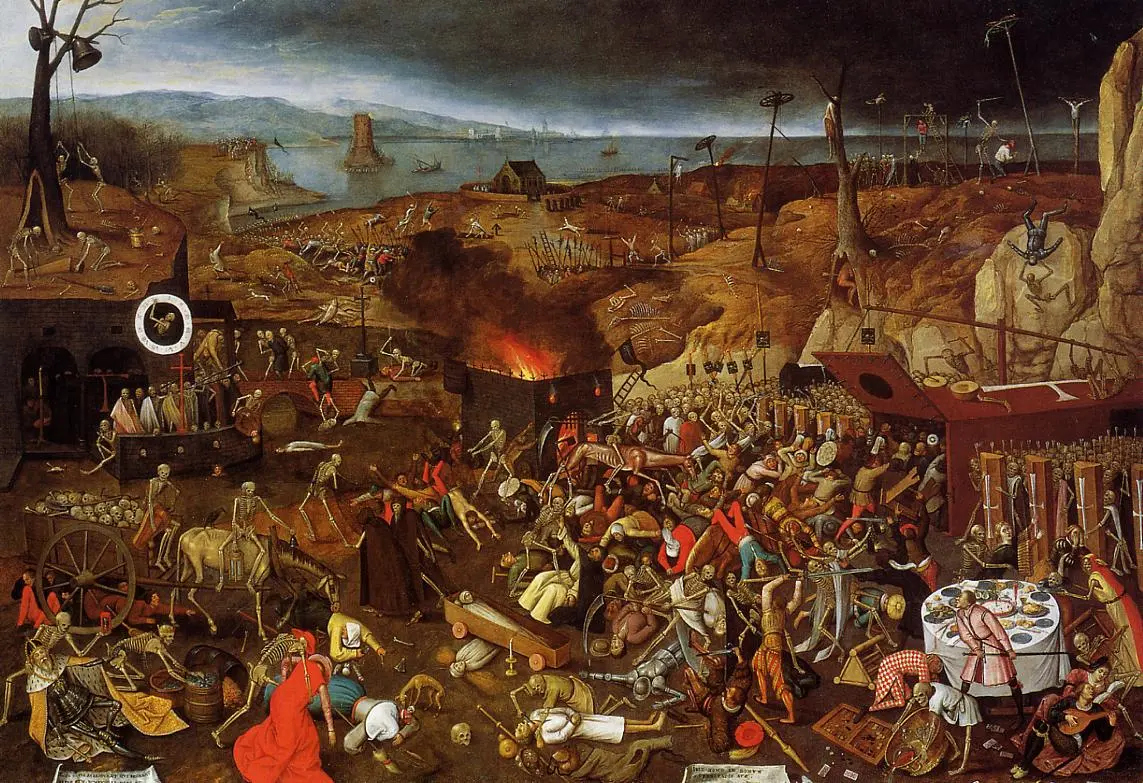
1626 version of The Triumph of Death attributed to Pieter Bruegel the Younger (formerly Cleveland (Ohio), now unknown private collection)

== Popular culture ==
The Triumph of Death appears as a background image for the text intro of the second part of the Monty Python sketch The Spanish Inquisition.

Sylvia Plath describes the painting, particularly the lovers in the lower right-hand corner, in her poem “Two Views of a Cadaver Room.”

Heavy metal band Black Sabbath released a compilation album titles Black Sabbath Greatest Hits in 1977 which used the painting as the front and back covers.

The painting was used on the cover of first edition printings of Cities of the Red Night, a 1981 novel by William S. Burroughs.

In Underworld, a 1996 novel by Don DeLillo, FBI director J. Edgar Hoover becomes utterly intrigued by the painting after seeing it reproduced in torn pages of Life magazine and eventually obtains a print of it.

The painting plays a pivotal role in The Rich Man's House, 2019, the final novel by Australian writer Andrew McGahan, with its theme of inevitable mortality. The rich man of the title (called Richman) has acquired the painting from the Museo del Prado and it hangs in pride of place in his mountaintop house.

The painting appears in Interview with the Vampire, by Anne Rice, as a mural in the entrance to the vampire Armand’s realm which lies below his Paris theatre.

A grayscale depiction of The Triumph Of Death appears as a motion background in the opening credits of The Pit and the Pendulum (1991).

The painting is used as the cover art to late Chicago rapper Juice WRLD's EP NOTHING'S DIFFERENT, released on SoundCloud in 2017.

== See also ==
- List of paintings by Pieter Bruegel the Elder
- 100 Great Paintings
- The Chariot of Death, painting by Théophile Schuler
