= House of Sclafani =

Italian noble family

Sclafani is an Italian noble family.

== History ==

Giovanni Sclifano was given a castle, Castello Megerio, and its territory by King William I of Sicily to show his gratitude for having Giovanni's support in the conspiracy of Matthew Bonello. A son of Giovanni, Goffredo Sclifano, founded a monastery in Lentini around the year 1185.

Matteo Sclafani, a powerful baron of the time who became the first Count of Adernò in 1303, during the rule of the Aragonese rule, and later also Count and Lord of Sclafani in 1330. Aside from being involved with the Knights Templar, he built many palaces and cathedrals throughout Italy including a magnificent royal palace in Palermo, Palazzo Sclafani (which later became an important hospital, today the Trinità military barracks), the Monastery of Santa Chiara in 1341, the church of Sant'Agostino, and of San Niccolò dell'Albergaria. He died in the year 1354, in Castle Pietrarossa, Caltanissetta. A second Matteo Scalafani was Count of Adernò and Lord of Cimina. His son, Antonino, helped free Blanche I of Navarre from the grip of Count Bernardo Cabrera, by secreting her into a boat of the harbor.

Due to lack of male heirs, some of the family's fortune of that time was passed to the Moncada family.

== Coat of arms ==
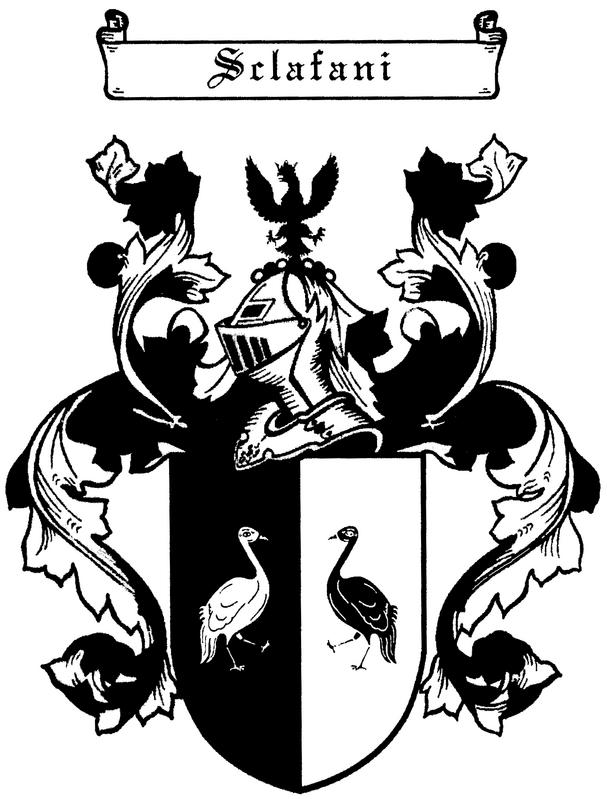
The Sclafani Crest

The Sclafani coat of arms is divided in half and bears two cranes facing one another, inversely colored in Argent (silver) to signify peace, and Sable (black) to represent jewels, specifically diamond. An eagle is displayed with a Count's crown of Or (gold) signifying the family's noble heritage.

Crane - Longevity, loyalty, vigilance.

Eagle - One of noble nature, strength, bravery, and alertness; one who is high-spirited, ingenious, quick-witted, judicious, true magnanimity and strength of mind. Wings displayed signifies protection.

== Cities ==
Cities bearing the name Sclafani:

Sclafani Bagni
Official Site
Elevation: 811 meters
Land Area: 135,06 km^{2}
Economy: agriculture, thermal station
Population: 506
Population name: Sclafanese

Chiusa Sclafani
Official Site
Elevation: 614 meters
Land Area: 58 km^{2}
Economy: agriculture, stock-breeding, timber
Population: 3.302
Population name: Chiusino

Cities with a large population of Sclafani:

Sciacca
Official Site
Elevation: 60 meters
Land Area: 191,0 km^{2}
Economy: agriculture, fishing, summer tourism, shipbuilding
Population: 40.240
Population name: Saccense

Palermo
Official Site
Elevation: 29 meters
Land Area: 158,88 km^{2}
Economy: agriculture (citrus fruit, vegetables), industries, handicraft, commerce and trade, tourism, services
Population: 686.722
Population name: Palermitano

== See also ==
- Palazzo Sclafani
- Sclafani Bagni
- Chiusa Sclafani
- Sclafani (surname)
