= Sclafani (surname) =

Sclafani is a surname.

The surname "Sclafani" is derived from the Greek "Aesculapii fanum," meaning "Sacred to the god Aesculapius," the Roman god of medicine, implying the Sclafani family has been gifted in the field of medicine and healing since the name's origin. Further, ancient thermal healing baths were created and still stand today in a city founded by the family, Sclafani Bagni. The Greek version of the surname Sclafani, "Sclavounos", can be located in the "Dictionnaire Historique et Généalogique des Grandes Familles de Grèce", a book which contains information about Greek nobility. The exact surname "Sclafani" can be found in the "Dizionario Storico Blasonico", an armorial of noble Italian family lineages.

Notable people with the surname include:

- Augustus Sclafani (died 1986), New York mobster associate with the Gambino crime family
- Anthony DeSclafani (born 1990), American professional baseball pitcher
- Anthony Sclafani (born 1944), American neuroscientist
- Joe Sclafani (born 1990), American former professional baseball infielder

== See also ==
- House of Sclafani
- Sclafani (disambiguation)
