= Palazzo Abatellis =

Palazzo and art gallery in Palermo, Italy

Coordinates: 38.1167°N 13.3711°E

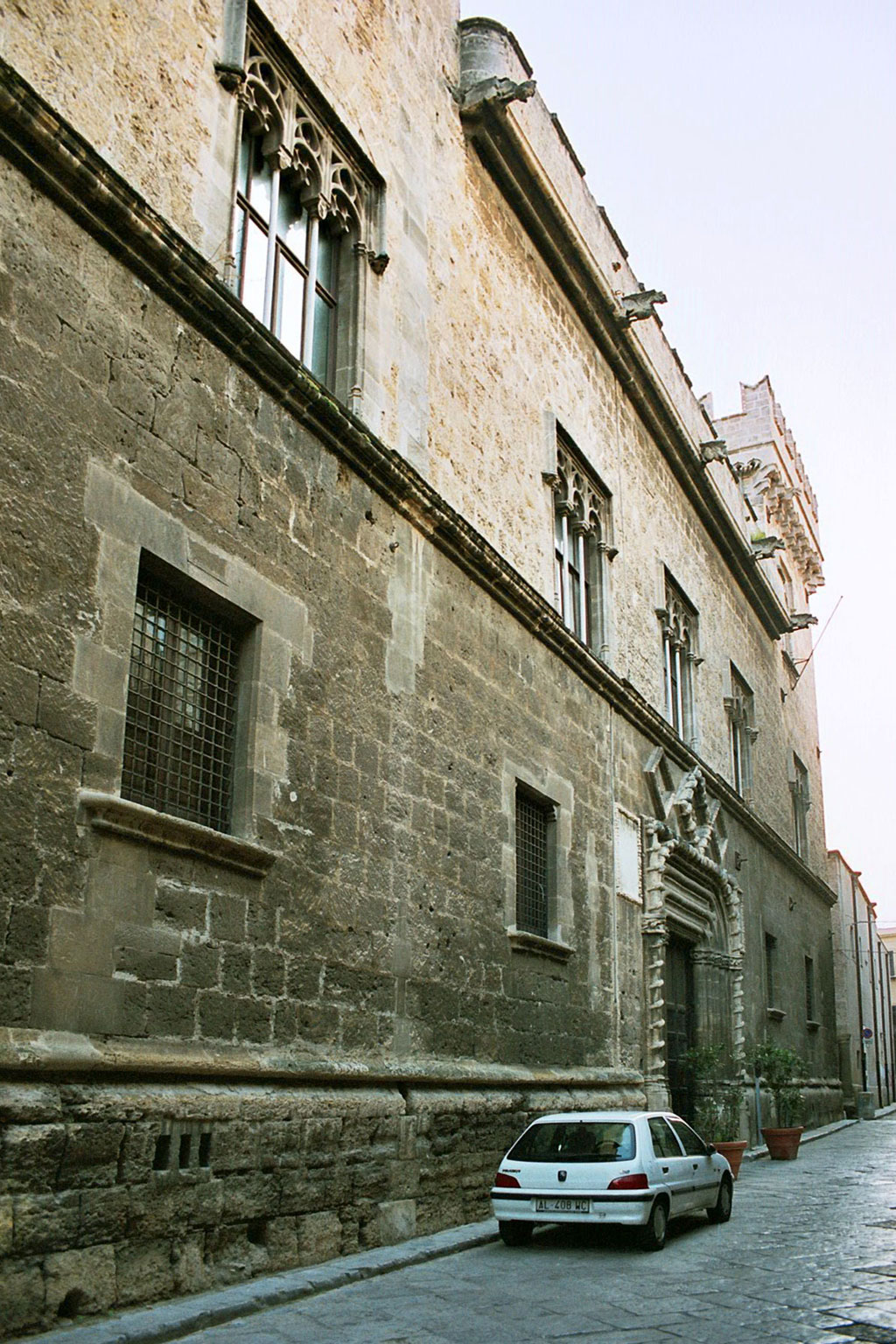
The main façade of the palace

Palazzo Abatellis (also known as Palazzo Patella) is a palazzo in Palermo, Sicily, southern Italy, located in the Kalsa quarter. It is home to the Galleria Regionale della Sicilia, the Gallery of Art for the Sicilian region.

== History ==
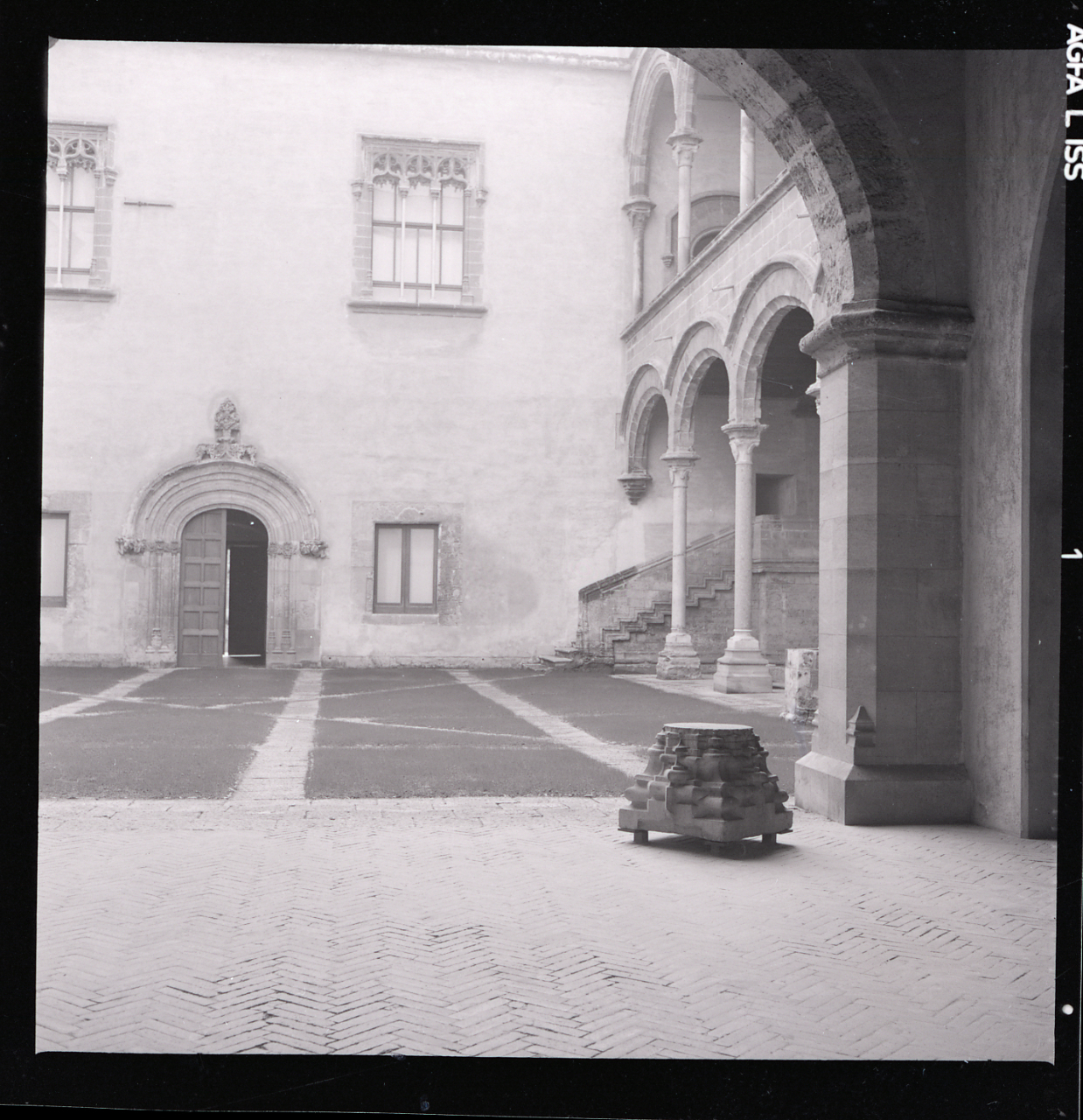
Atrium of the palazzo, photo by Paolo Monti, 1961

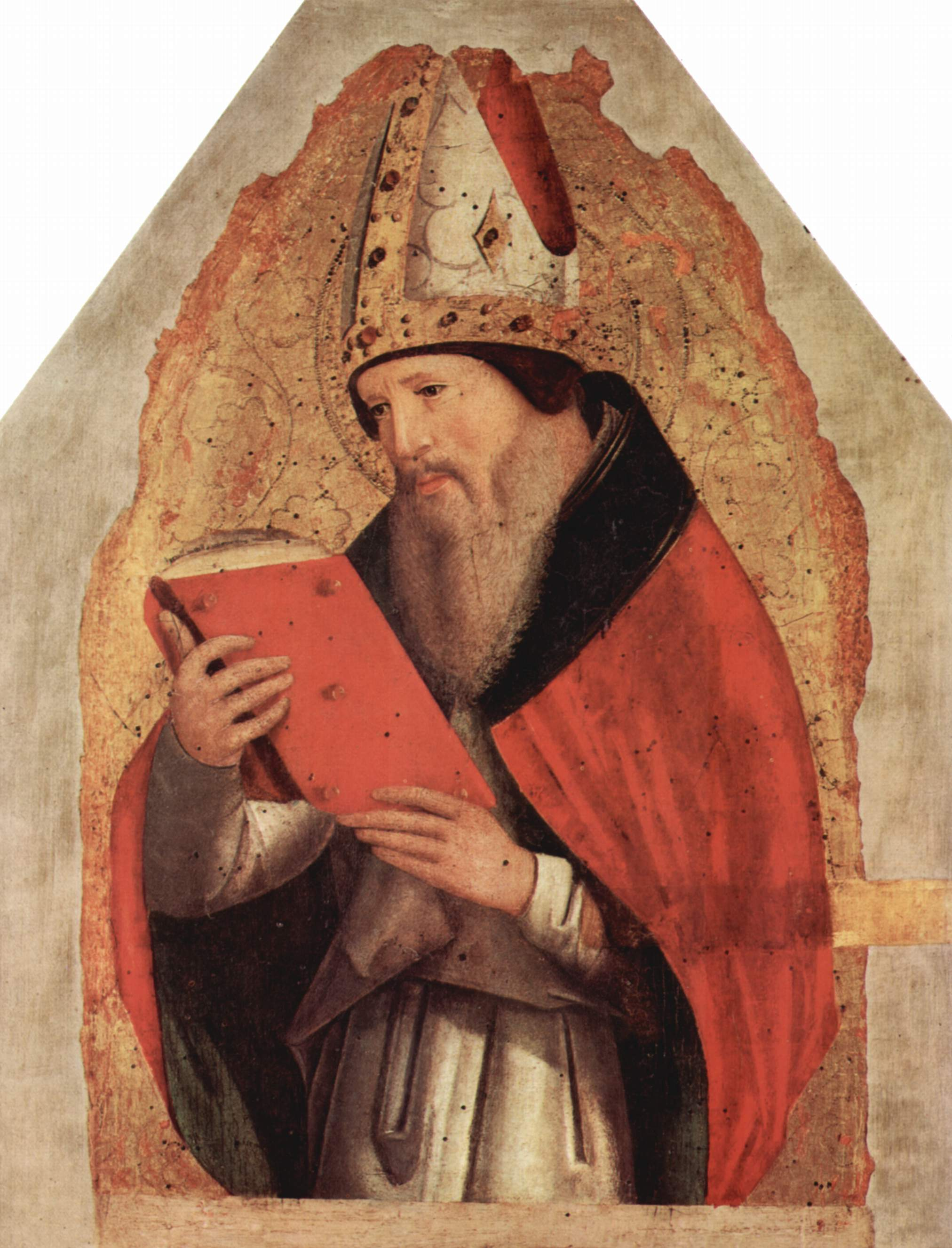
St. Augustine by Antonello da Messina

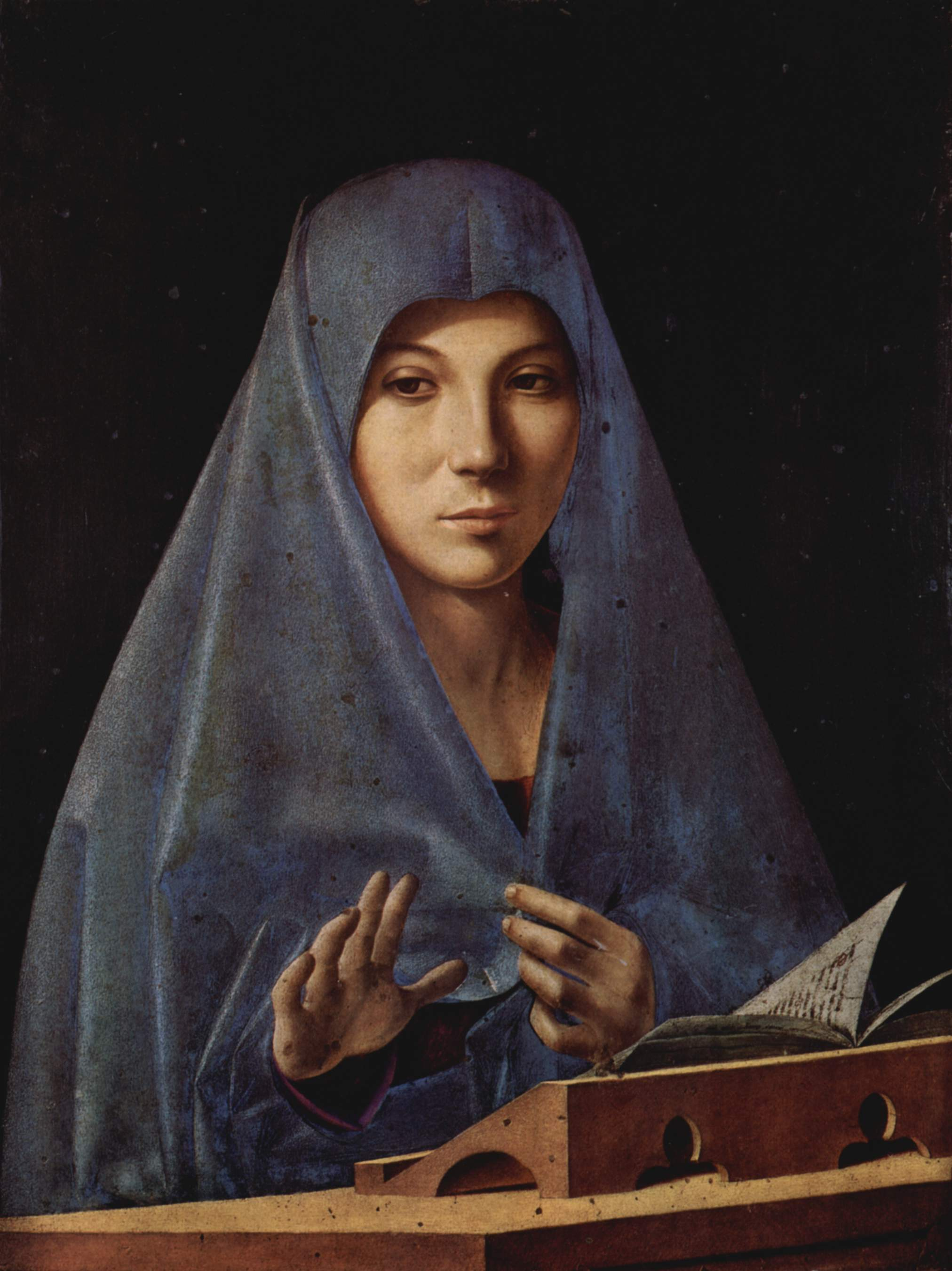
Virgin Annunciate by Antonello da Messina

The palazzo, an example of Gothic-Catalan architecture, was designed in the 15th century by Matteo Carnelivari, at the time working in Palermo at the palazzo Aiutamicristo. It was the residence of Francesco Abatellis (or Patella), port master of the Kingdom of Sicily.

After the death of Abatellis, it remained to his wife, and, after her death, it was given to a female monastery. Several modifications were carried on to adapt it to monastic life. They included a chapel, built on the left side of the chapel (1535–1541), hiding one of the façades. In the 18th century, following the construction of a bigger church (the current Santa Maria della Pietà), the chapel was abolished and divided into several rooms. The front part was used as parlatory, while the rear section, with the altar removed, was turned into a series of storage rooms.

During the night between 16 and 17 April 1943 the palace was struck during an Allied air bombing: the loggia, the portico, the south-western sector and the wall of the western tower crumbled down. The palace was then restored, and it was decided to use it for the Galleria d’Arte per le collezioni d’arte medievale ("Gallery of medieval collection"). Works were directed by the architects Mario Guiotto and, later, Armando Dillon. They were completed in 1953, and Carlo Scarpa was commissioned the setup of the art gallery, which was opened on 23 June 1954.

== Museum ==
The regional gallery is home to many works acquired when several religious orders were suppressed in 1866. They were previously housed in the Pinacoteca della Regia Università and, from 1866, in the Museo Nazionale of Palermo, which became a regional museum when Sicily acquired autonomous status.

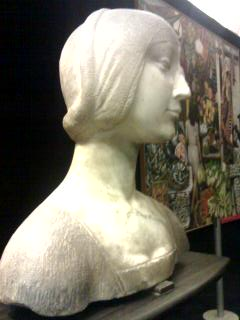
Bust of a Gentlewoman by Francesco Laurana.

The ground floor contains 12th-century wooden works, 14th- and 15th-century works including some by Antonello Gagini, painted maiolica from the 14th–17th centuries, the 15th-century Bust of a Gentlewoman by Francesco Laurana and painted panels of wooden ceilings. The large fresco of the Triumph of Death (most likely dating to 1445), is exhibited in the former chapel.

On the first floor is the museum's most famous work, the Virgin Annunciate, by Antonello da Messina (15th century), considered a masterpiece of High Renaissance paintings. Also present are three panels with St. Augustine, St. Gregory the Great and St. Jerome also by Antonello, once part of a polyptych now destroyed, and Vouet's Saint Agatha's Vision of Saint Peter in Prison. The museum contains the Netherlandish Malvagna triptych by the Early Netherlandish painters: Jan Gossaert and Gerard David, and a Deposition by Jan Provost. It also houses a depiction of Moses by Pietro Novelli.
