= Treaty of Péronne (1468) =

1468 treaty between Burgundy and France

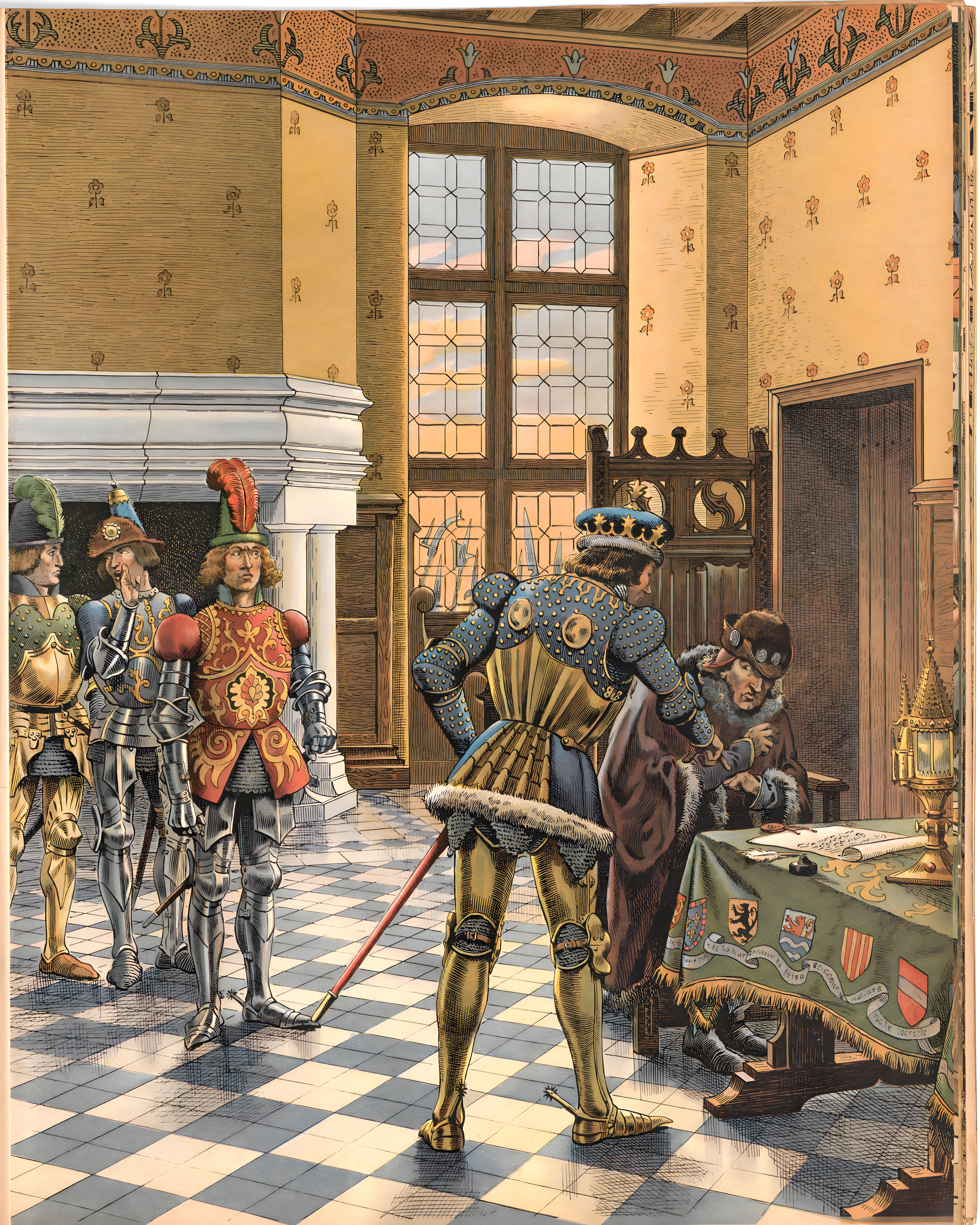
Illustration of the treaty by French artist Job (1905)

The Treaty of Péronne was signed in Péronne (in the county of Vermandois, a then Burgundian territory) on October 14, 1468, between Charles the Bold, Duke of Burgundy and Louis XI of France. Based on the terms of the treaty, Charles especially acquired the English claimed county of Ponthieu. On the Burgundian side the accord was discussed by Charles, mainly assisted by his long-time favorite Guillaume de Bische and his councillor Ferry de Clugny; on the French side it was negotiated by the king Louis himself and the Cardinal de la Balue.

== See also ==
- List of treaties
