= Saint Agatha's Vision of Saint Peter in Prison =

Painting by Simon Vouet

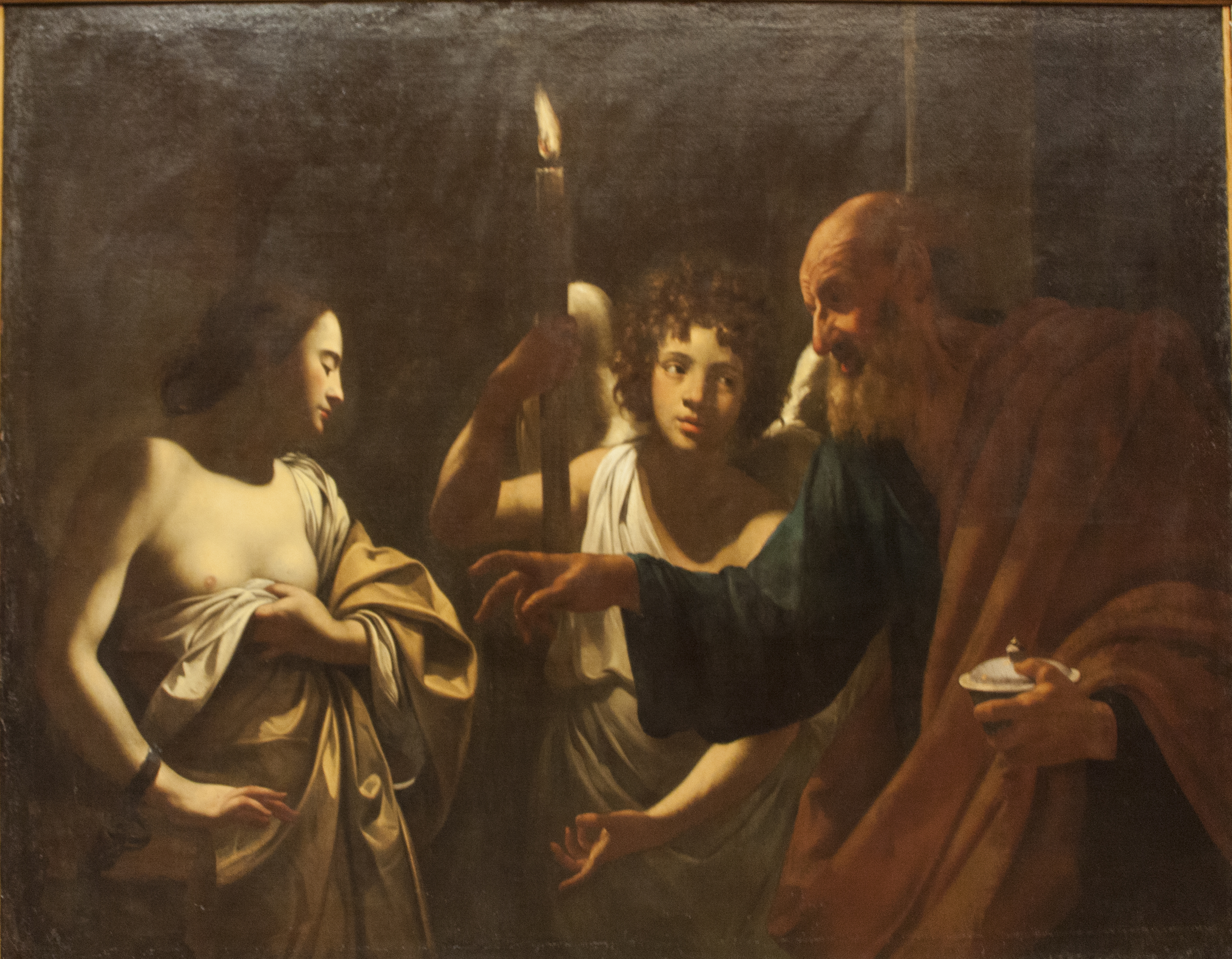
Saint Agatha's Vision of Saint Peter in Prison (c. 1625) by Simon Vouet

Saint Agatha's Vision of Saint Peter in Prison is an oil-on-canvas painting created c.1625 by the French painter Simon Vouet, showing the imprisoned Agatha of Sicily having a vision of a visit from Peter the Apostle, who heals her wounds. It is now in the Galleria Regionale del Palazzo Abatellis in Palermo, where it entered from the former Jesuit college in Cassaro.
