= The Triumph of Death (Palermo) =

15th-century fresco in Sicily

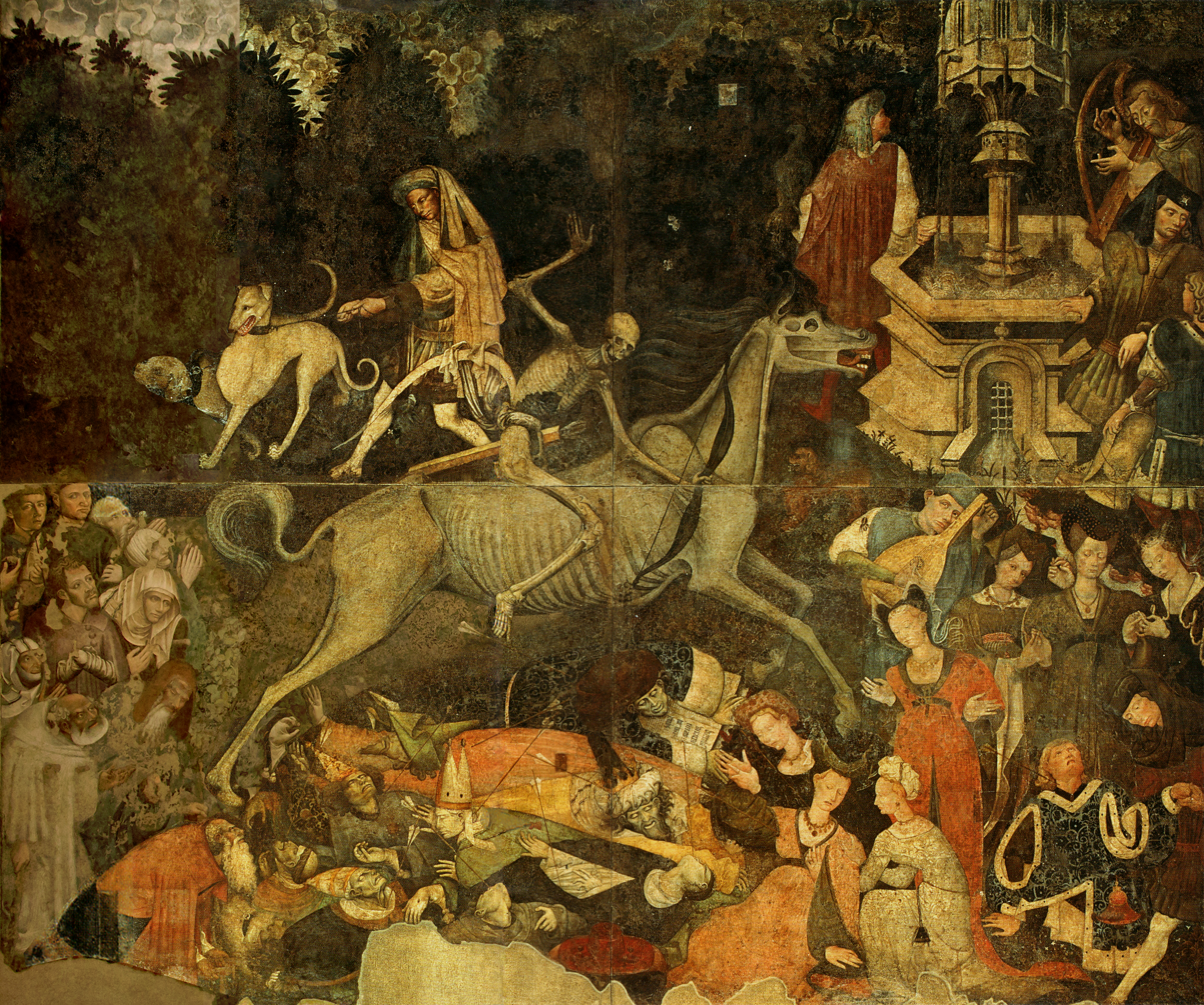
- Year: circa 1440-45
- Type: Fresco
- Dimensions: 600 cm × 642 cm (240 in × 253 in)
- Location: Palazzo Abatellis; Palermo

The Triumph of Death is a fresco created around 1440-5 now housed in the Regional Gallery of Palazzo Abatellis in Palermo, southern Italy. The name of the artist of the work has been debated.

== History ==
The fresco comes from the court of Palazzo Sclafani, also in Palermo. Due to its highly refined style, it is thought to have been commissioned by the Aragonese Kings of Naples. The theme of the "Triumph of Death" was popular in Europe during the Renaissance, particularly in Northern Europe. The Burgundian artist Guillaume Spicre, also known as the Palazzo Sclafani Master, is often credited with its creation, although other names have been suggested.

The fresco was stripped and divided into four parts to be housed in the Regional Gallery, where it is now located. Though at the time of the removal the work was in good condition, gradually during the 20th century the painted surface has detached near the points of division, compromising the integrity of the scene.

It is thought that this work served as inspiration for the creation of Picasso's Guernica.

== Description ==
The fresco depicts a luxurious garden surrounded by a hedge. Death enters riding a skeletal horse, firing arrows from a bow. Death aims at characters belonging to all social levels, killing them. The horse occupies the center of the scene, with its ribs visible and an emaciated head showing teeth and the tongue. Death has just released an arrow, which has hit a young man in the lower right corner; Death also wears a scythe at the side of the saddle, its typical attribute.

On the lower part are corpses of the people previously killed: emperors, popes, bishops, friars (both Franciscans and Dominicans), poets, knights and maidens. Each character is portrayed differently: some still have a grimace of pain on the face, while others are serene; some have their limbs dismembered on the ground, and others are kneeling after having been just struck by an arrow. On the left is a group of poor people, invoking Death to stop their suffering, but being ignored. Among them, the figure looking towards the observer has been proposed as a possible self-portrait of the artist.

On the right, a group of richly dressed noblewomen and knights with fur clothes are entertained by a musician. They appear to have no interest in the events and continue to socialize. The women in this group wear ostentatious necklaces and some are adorned with long, dangling earrings. A sumptuary law passed in Sicily in 1420 prohibited the wearing of expensive gold jewelry, except for rings, and declared that earrings could only be worn at particularly important celebrations. A man with a falcon on his arm and another leading two hounds represent common pursuits of the noble classes in the Renaissance.

== Trivia ==
The fresco plays an important role in Wim Wenders’ film Palermo Shooting of 2008, where a young restorer (Giovanna Mezzogiorno) is working on it and gets in contact with a photographer (Campino), "lost" in the city and haunted by death, played by Dennis Hopper.

== Sources ==
- De Vecchi, Pierluigi; Elda Cerchiari (1999). I tempi dell'arte. Milan: Bompiani.
