= Matteo Carnelivari =

Italian architect

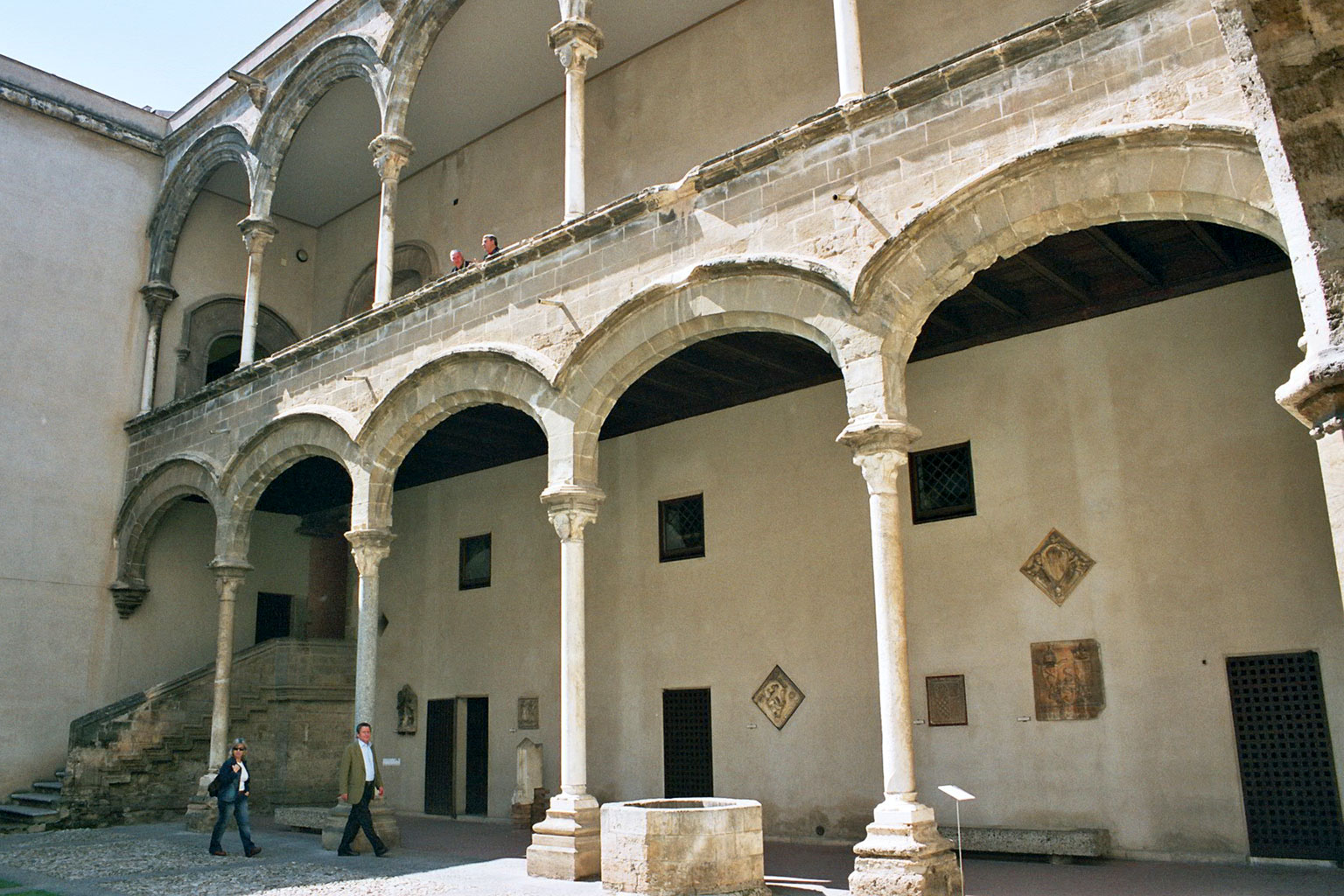
Courtyard of the Palazzo Abatellis

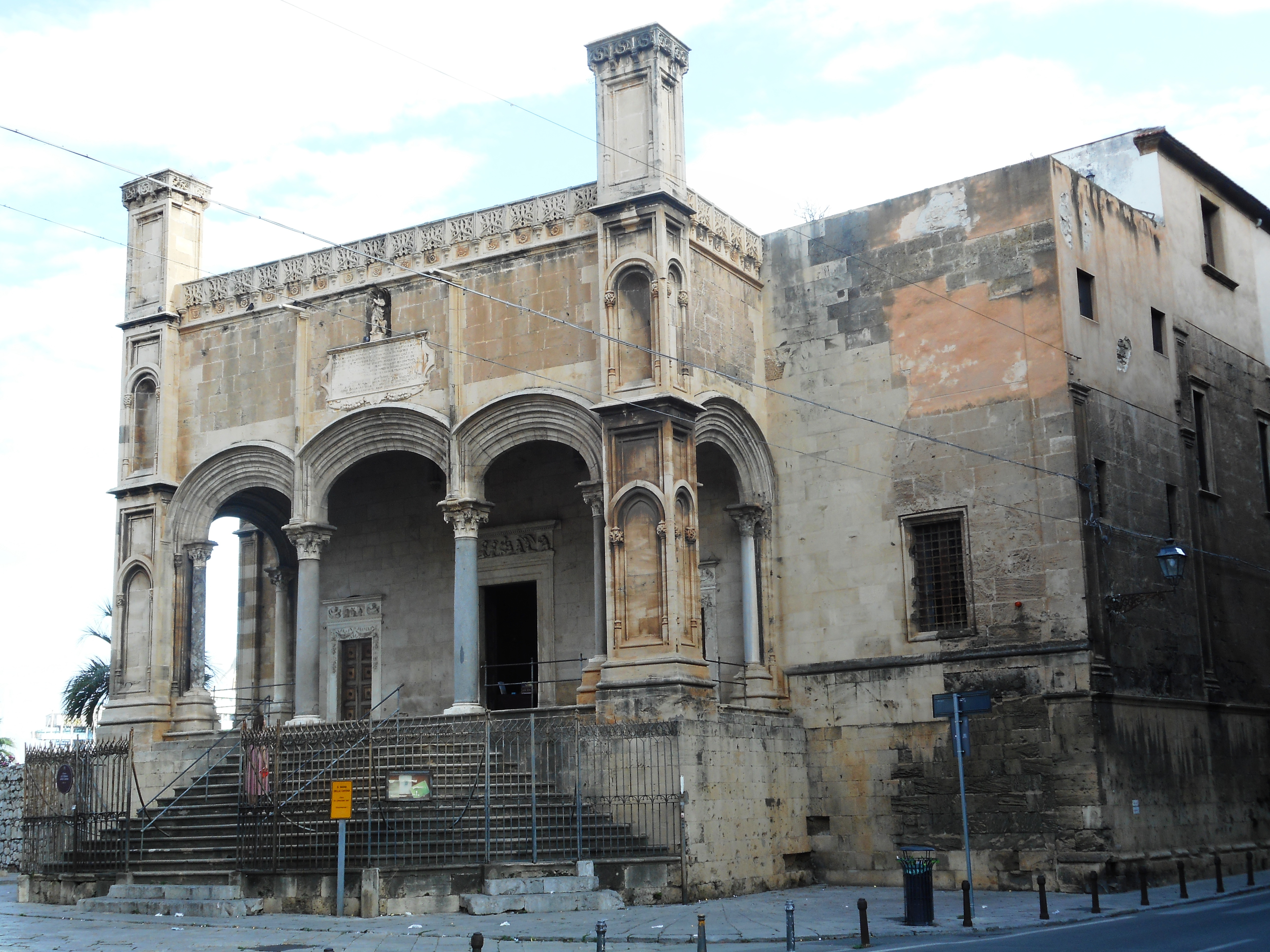
Santa Maria della Catena

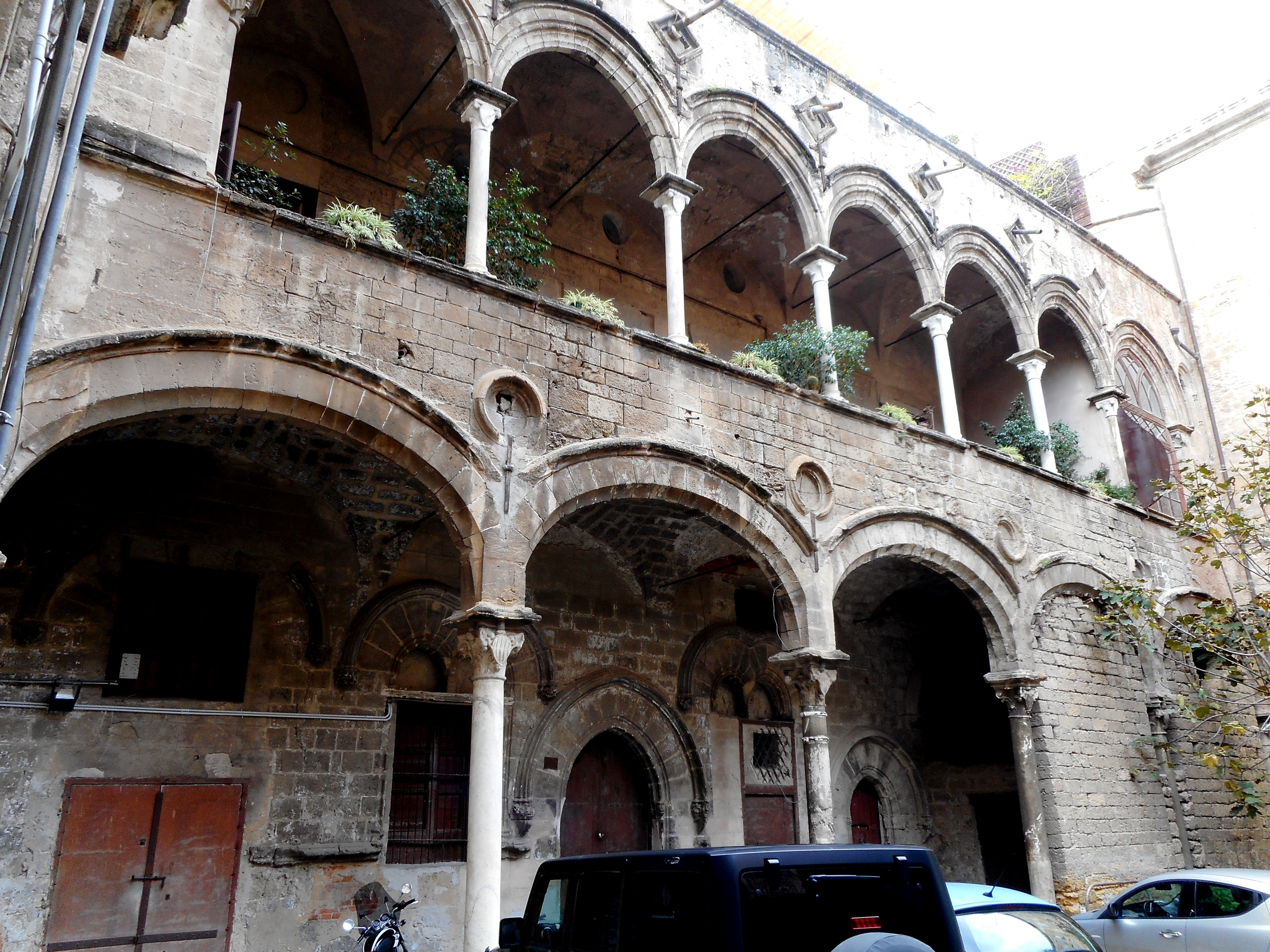
Courtyard of Palazzo Aiutamicristo

Matteo Carnilivari or Carnelivari was an Italian architect active mainly from 1487 to 1493 in Palermo, Sicily.

== Biography ==
The notable architect of 15th-century Sicily is known for works that show the influences of International Gothic with Norman-Swabian motifs influenced by Catalan art and of the new Renaissance style.

Among his main works are two palaces in Palermo: the Palazzo Abatellis built 1487 - 1493 with a medieval side-tower and the Palazzo Aiutamicristo built 1490 - 1495 with its Spanish-style courtyard. The design of the church of Santa Maria della Catena has been attributed to him by its similarities with his other designs.

== Designs ==
- Castello Chiaromontano or castello dell'Emiro (1487-1488) in Misilmeri, owned by Guglielmo Ajutamicristo.
- Madonna della Vittoria church: rebuilt in 1488, and now part of the Oratorio dei Bianchi complex.
- Regia Cancelleria (1489) head of completion works.
- Palazzo of the baron of Sant'Angelo Muxaro (1490) in Agrigento.
- Castello Vvevo (1494) in Augusta, Italy, headed restoration works
