= Giuseppe Crestadoro =

Italian painter (1711–1808)

Giuseppe Crestadoro (Palermo, Sicily, 1711 – Messina, 1808) was an Italian painter.

== Biography ==
Born to a jeweler, he first trained in Palermo under Vito D'Anna. He returned to Messina in 1743, after a devastating plague had decimated the city. Described as having a passionate character, and belonging to no school, but an original genius. In 1783, he moved to Siracusa to paint some churches, including the ceiling of the church of the Monastery of Santa Maria, the church of Saint Lucia, the church of the convent of San Francesco, and the Tribuna dello Spirito Santo. Returning to Messina and Sicily, he painted in Ficarra and Saponara.

In Messina, he painted an oil canvas depicting St Anne and Saints for the church of San Francesco di Paola, a number of canvases, including a Heart of Jesus for Santa Teresa, and an Immaculate Conception in the church of San Filippo Neri. He also painted frescoes in the church of Santa Teresa in Basicò, and for the chapel of San Giuseppe dei PP. Crociferi, and for the church of Santa Barbara. He also painted frescoes depicting the Glory of the Virtuous Prince for Palazzo Ajutamicristo.
