= Malvagna triptych =

Altarpiece by Jan Gossaet

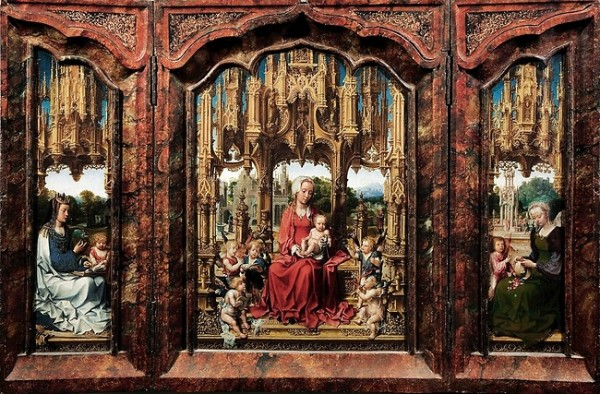
Malvagna Triptych (1513-1515), Oil on panel, Galleria Regionale della Sicilia, Palermo

The Malvagna Triptych (1513-1515) is a predella altarpiece by the Flemish artist Jan Gossaert located in the Galleria Regionale della Sicilia, in Palermo, Sicily.

The triptych had arrived, complete, in Malvagna, Sicily by the 1600s. The central panel of the interior depicts a Virgin and Child with Musical Putti (child angels). The side panels respectively depict St Catherine with a book on her lap, and sword at her feet; and St Dorothy weaving with a cherubic angel a crown of flowers on to a band. On the exterior, when the wings are closed, Adam and Eve in the Garden.

Thus the outer frame indicates the acquisition of original sin, while gathering fruit, while the inside depicts our liberation from such sin. One saint uses scripture to defend herself, and for the other, the fruits and flowers are gathered in a crown of martyrdom.

In its original frame, this small house altar is the artist's only surviving intact triptych. Maryan Ainsworth on the basis of connoisseurship assessed that the external landscape was painted by Gerard David. Gossart and David also worked together on the figures of the interior panels.
