= Pierre Spicre =

French painter

Pierre Spicre (floruit 1470–1478) was a painter in the Duchy of Burgundy.

Spicre is thought to have been born between 1435 and 1440 and is presumed to have been the son of Guillaume Spicre, a painter of stained glass windows from Dijon who has been recorded in the service of Duke Philip the Good between 1450 and 1468. The first mention of Pierre Spicre is in 1470, to judge the finished tomb of John the Fearless and Margaret of Bavaria in Champmol. He painted a retable for the Lausanne Cathedral in 1473, and 21 modellos for the Notre Dame Church in Beaune in 1474-1475. These works are presumed lost, just like the modello he made for a tapestry of Saint Bernard. In 1477 he was still recorded as living in Dijon, but he died either later that year or in 1478.

No certain works by the artist are preserved, but some works have been attributed speculatively to him. This includes some remnants of wall paintings in the Notre Dame in Beaune, showing the Raising of Lazarus and the Stoning of Saint Stephen; wall paintings in the Chapelle Dorée (the Gilded Chapel) in the Autun Cathedral; and wall paintings in the Château Saint-Maire in Lausanne. A Mass of Saint Gregory in the Louvre has also been attributed tentatively to Spicre. Whether a series of tapestries in the Notre Dame in Beaune is based on his lost modellos or not is disputed.
