= Palazzo Ajutamicristo =

Italian palace

Coordinates: 38°06′47″N 13°22′04″E

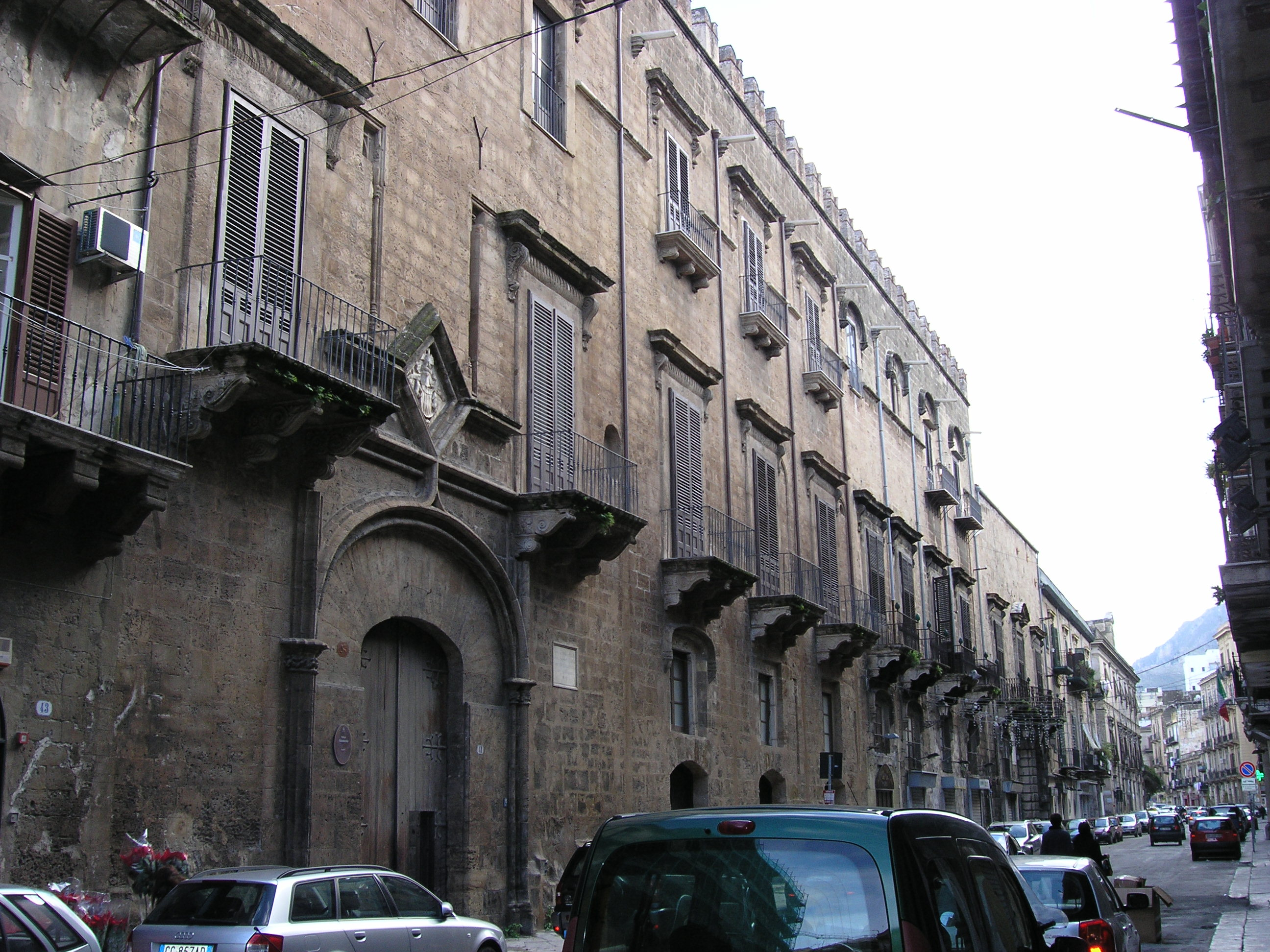
Palazzo Ajutamicristo

Palazzo Ajutamicristo is a Late-Gothic and Renaissance-style aristocratic palace located on VIa Garibaldi #23 of the ancient Kalsa quarter of Palermo, region of Sicily, Italy. It rises about a block south of Piazza Rivoluzione.

== History ==
It was constructed between 1495 and 1501 by Guglielmo Ajutamicristo, Baron of Misilmeri and Calatafimi. Originally a merchant from a Pisan family, Ajutamicristo made his fortune trading in Sicilian cheese and cereals. The palazzo was built to celebrate and display the family's newly amassed wealth.

The architect selected was the eminent Matteo Carnilivari and a site chosen in the street now called Via Garibaldi, close to the now demolished Termini Gate. The original plan was for a far larger and extravagant house; however, these plans had to be modified and financial restraint exercised. Thus, the completed house was smaller than originally intended.

In spite of its reduced size the house became a centre of Sicilian high society, and was considered a residence superior to Palermo's royal palace. As a consequence, the Ajutamicristos entertained many leading political figures of the day: the Queen of Naples was entertained in great style at the house in 1500, and the Emperor Charles V in 1535.

The Ajutamicristo's ownership of the house was to be short-lived, and in 1588 the owner, Margherita Ajutamicristo, sold the building to Francesco Moncada, Ist Prince of Paternò. The property remained in the ownership of the Paternò family for two hundred years until the 18th century when it was sold to Baron Calefati di Canalotti in whose family it has remained until the present day.

The Calefati family had many of the salons remodelled. Of particular note is the frescoed ballroom with its ceiling painted by Giuseppe Crestadoro depicting The Glory of the Virtuous Prince.

Presently the palace has multiple uses, including private residence of the Calefati family, bedrooms can be rented at a bed and breakfast, and the piano nobile or courtyard may be rented for private functions.

== Description ==
The exterior consists of rectangular stones of various sizes linked by mortar. The main portal is asymmetrically located on the south end, it was meant to be flanked by symmetric wings. The portal has a robust stone arch. The Northern wing has a merlionated roofline, and second and third story balconies. The second story balconies have sturdy stone brackets.
