= Palazzo Sclafani =

Building in Palermo, Italy

Coordinates: 38.1125°N 13.3568°E

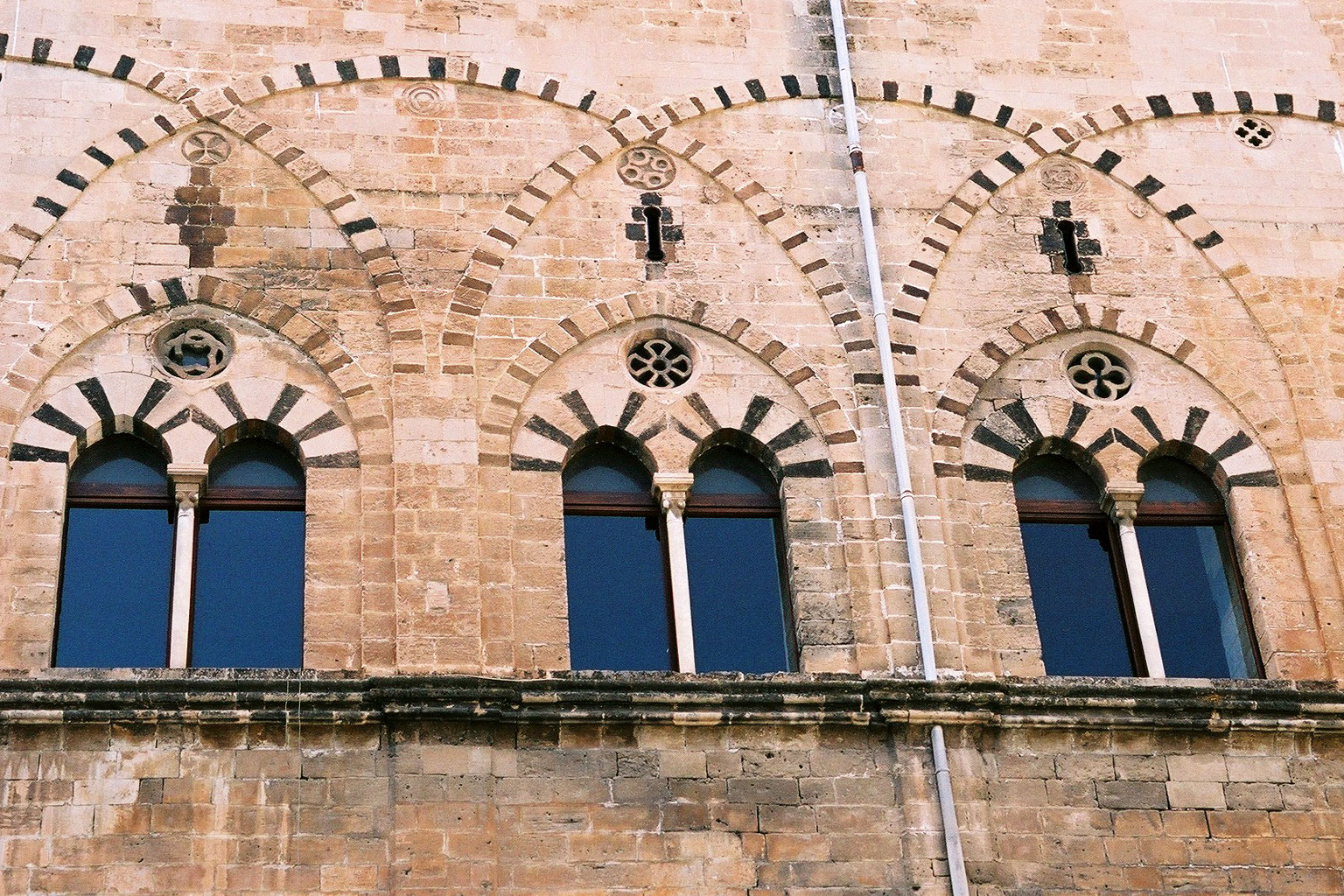
Detail of the façade of Palazzo Sclafani.

Palazzo Sclafani is a medieval former aristocratic palace located on Piazza della Vittoria #14, in Palermo, region of Sicily, Italy. Across the Piazza della Vittoria park rises the Palazzo dei Normanni and the street along the park leads in a block to the cathedral.

== History ==
Constructed in 1330 by lord Matteo Sclafani, Count of Adernò, its design was in competition with his brother-in-law's contemporary Palazzo Chiaramonte.

The original appearance was changed in 1435 when it was turned into a civic hospital the Ospedale Grande e Nuovo, and in 1832 when it became a barracks. Today it houses the military command. On the Southern facade facing Piazza San Giovanni Decollato, on the third floor, intertwined multicolor arches dance atop elegant mullioned windows. The design recalls Moorish architecture of earlier centuries. Above the entrance, the coat of arms of the Sclafani family is proudly displayed, as well as an eagle (signifying the family's noble heritage) by the sculptor Bonaiuto Pisano.

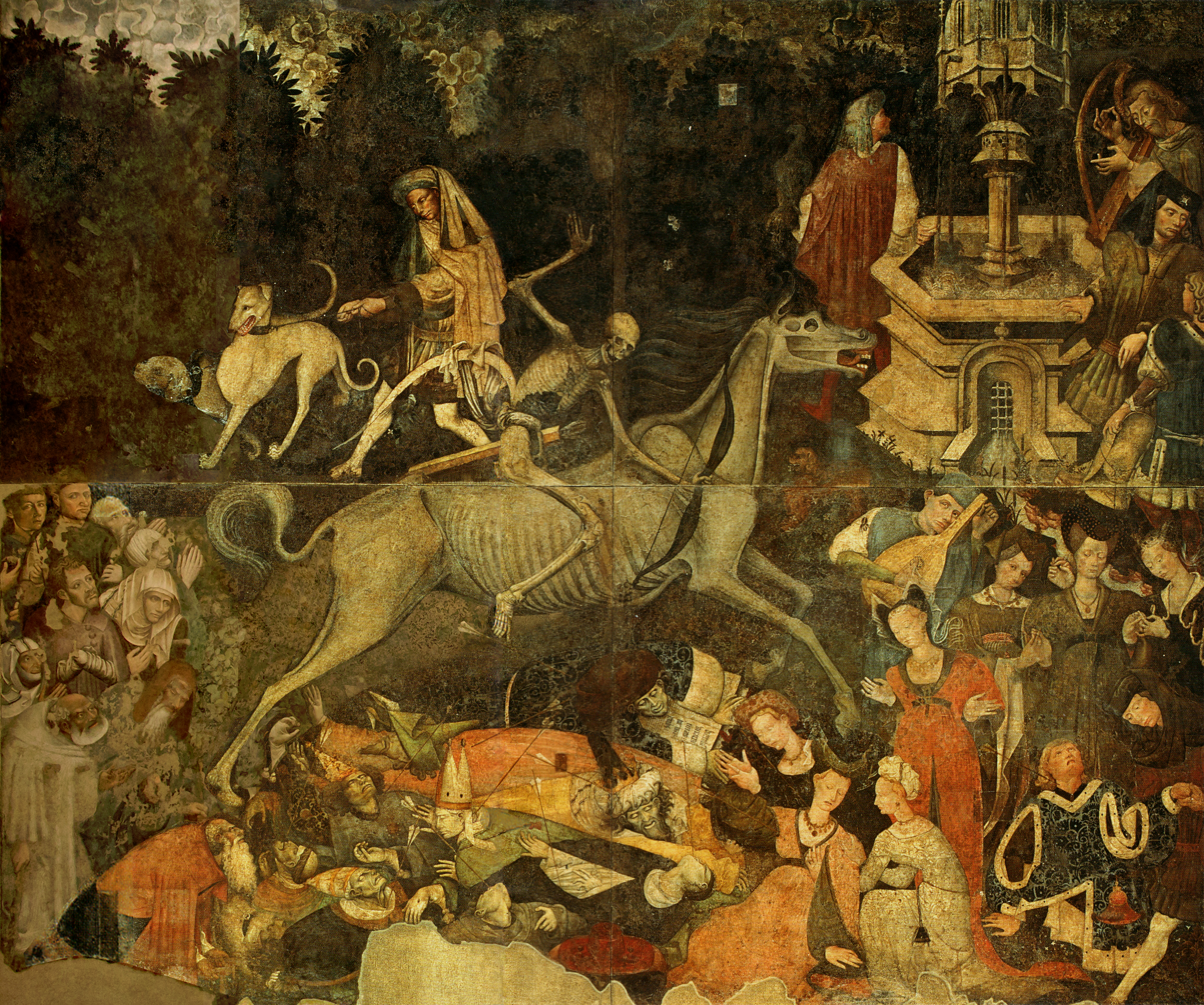
Fresco of the Triumph of Death.

The large Triumph of Death fresco (1446) that was originally located in the court of Palazzo Sclafani now hangs in the Palazzo Abatellis.
