= Catania =

City in Sicily, Italy

- Comune
- Comune di Catania
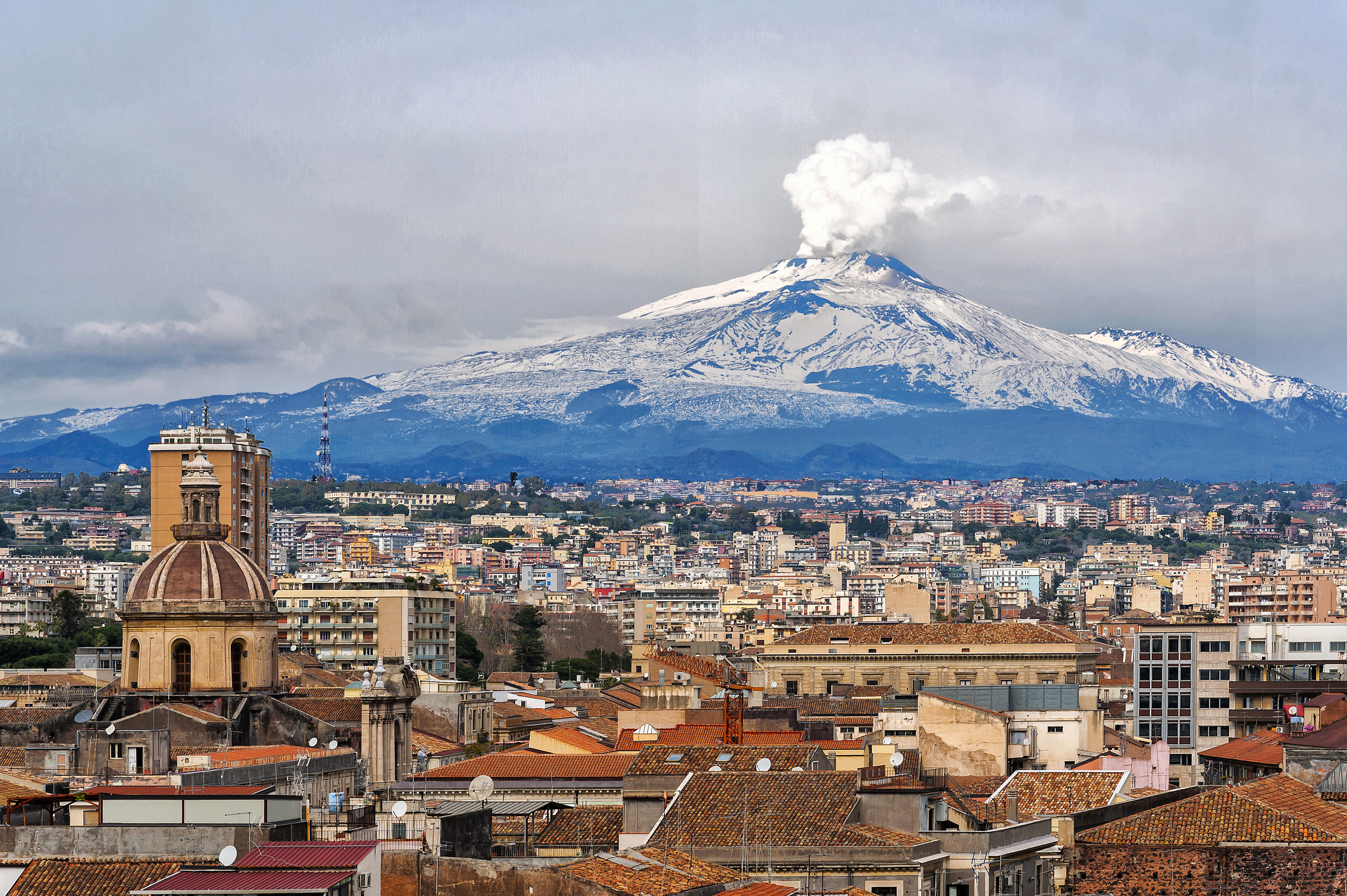
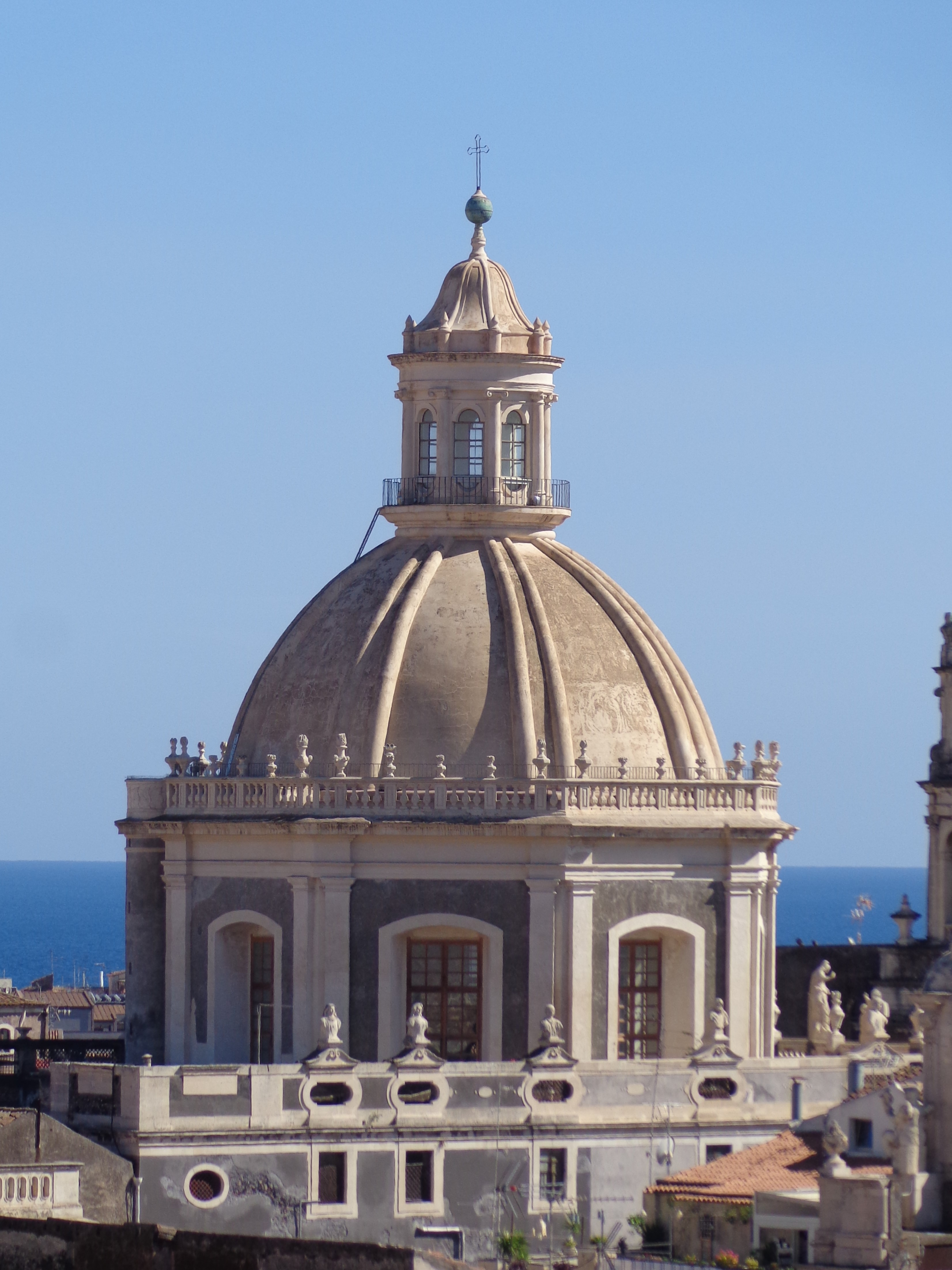
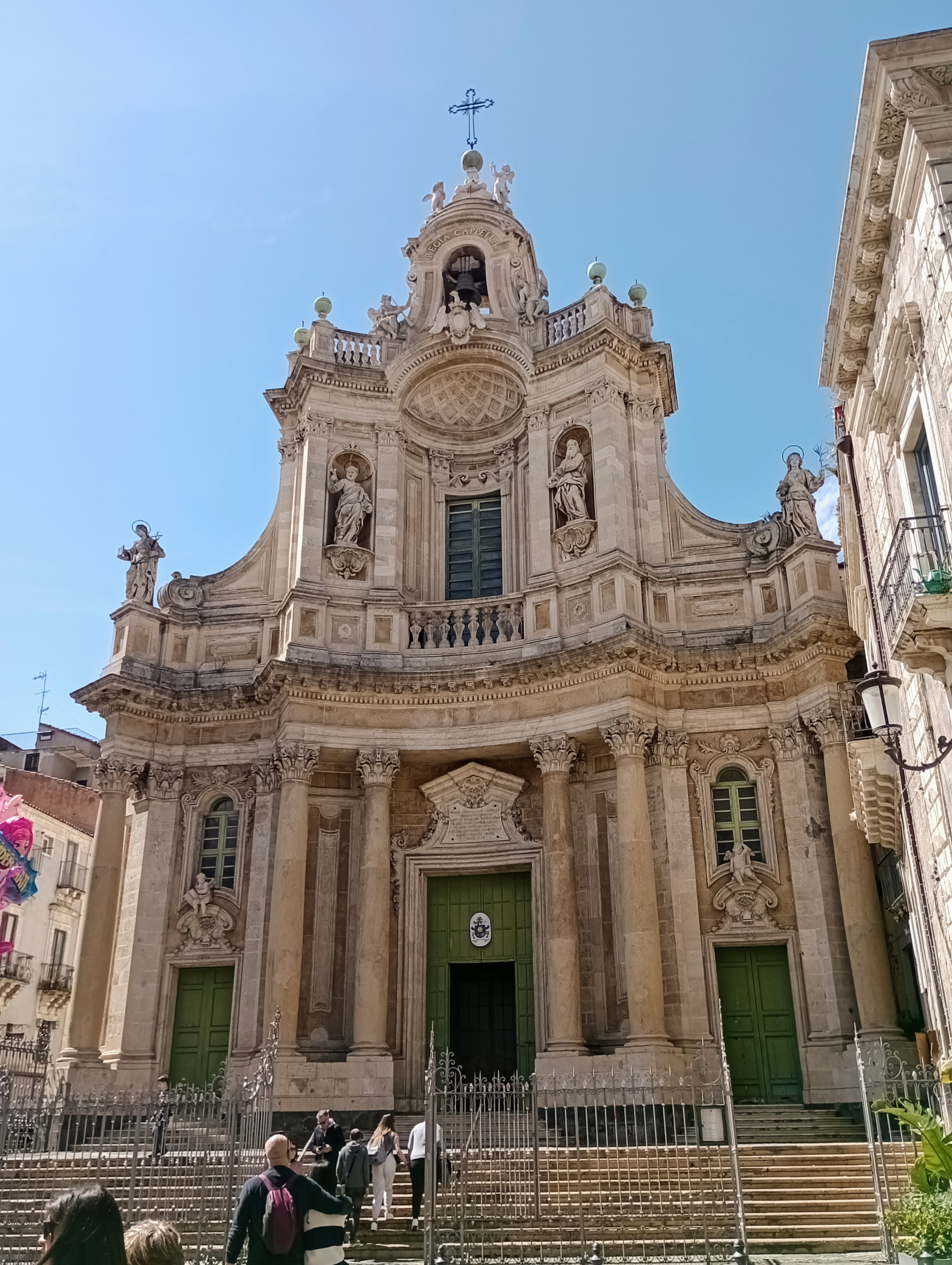
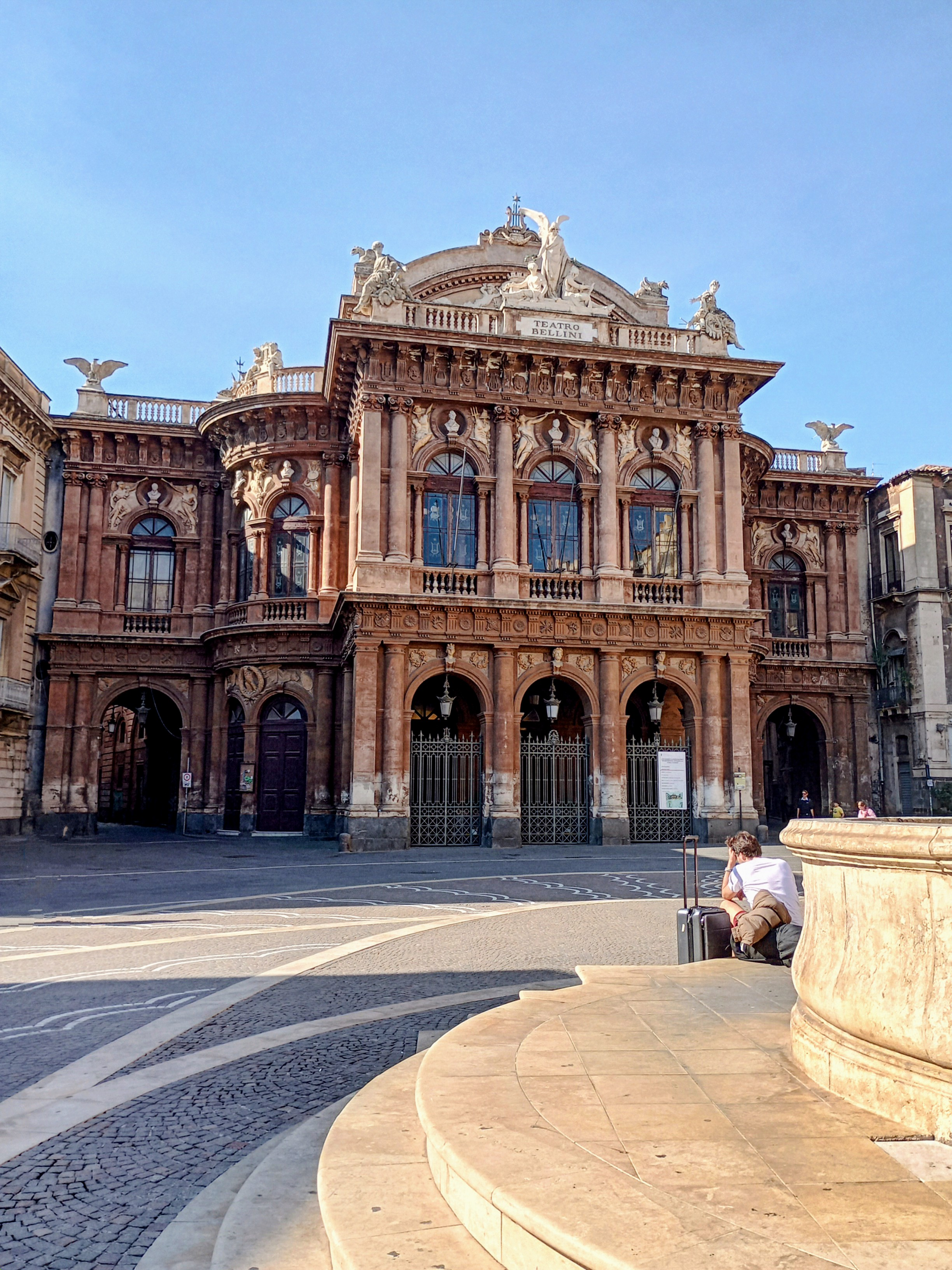
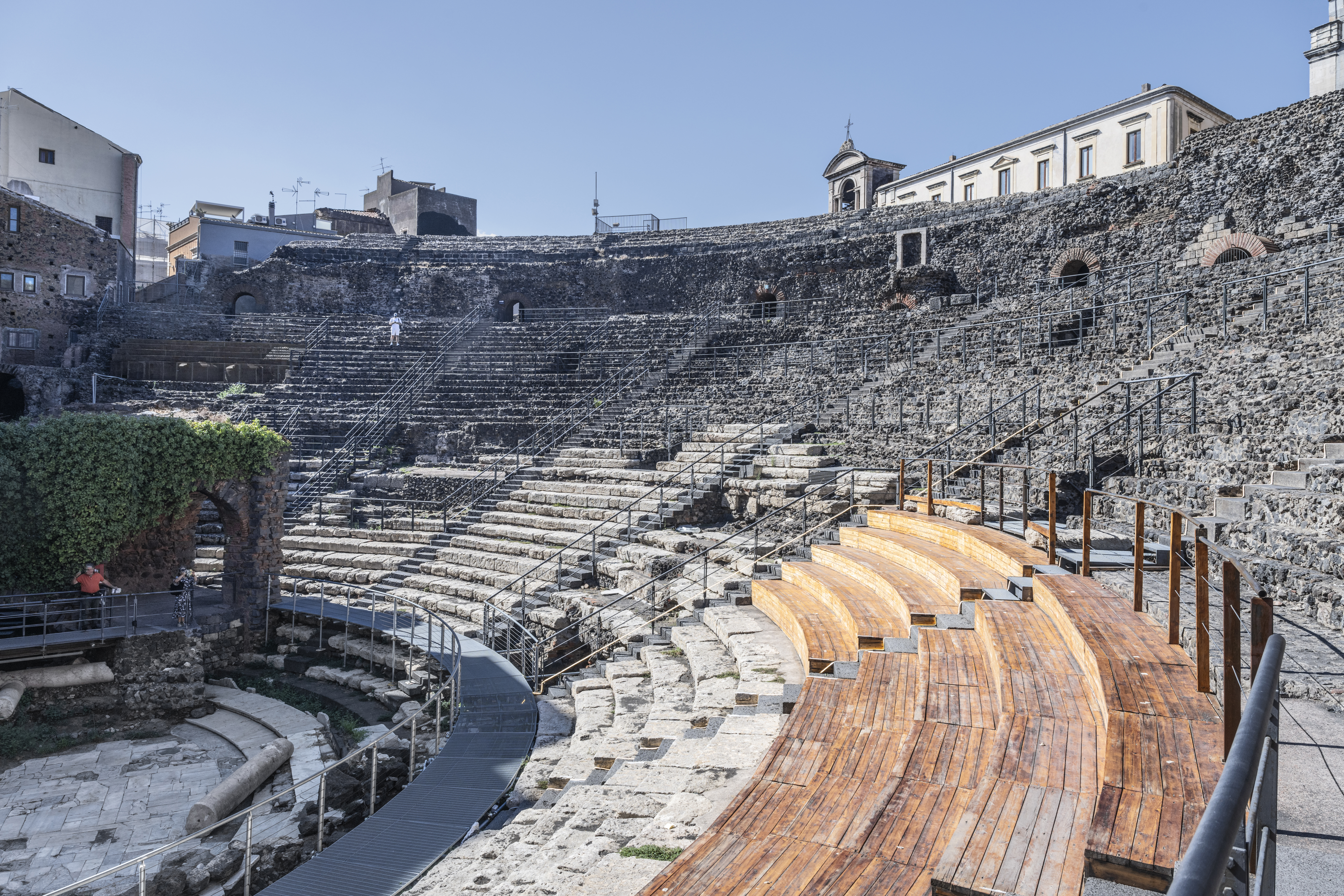
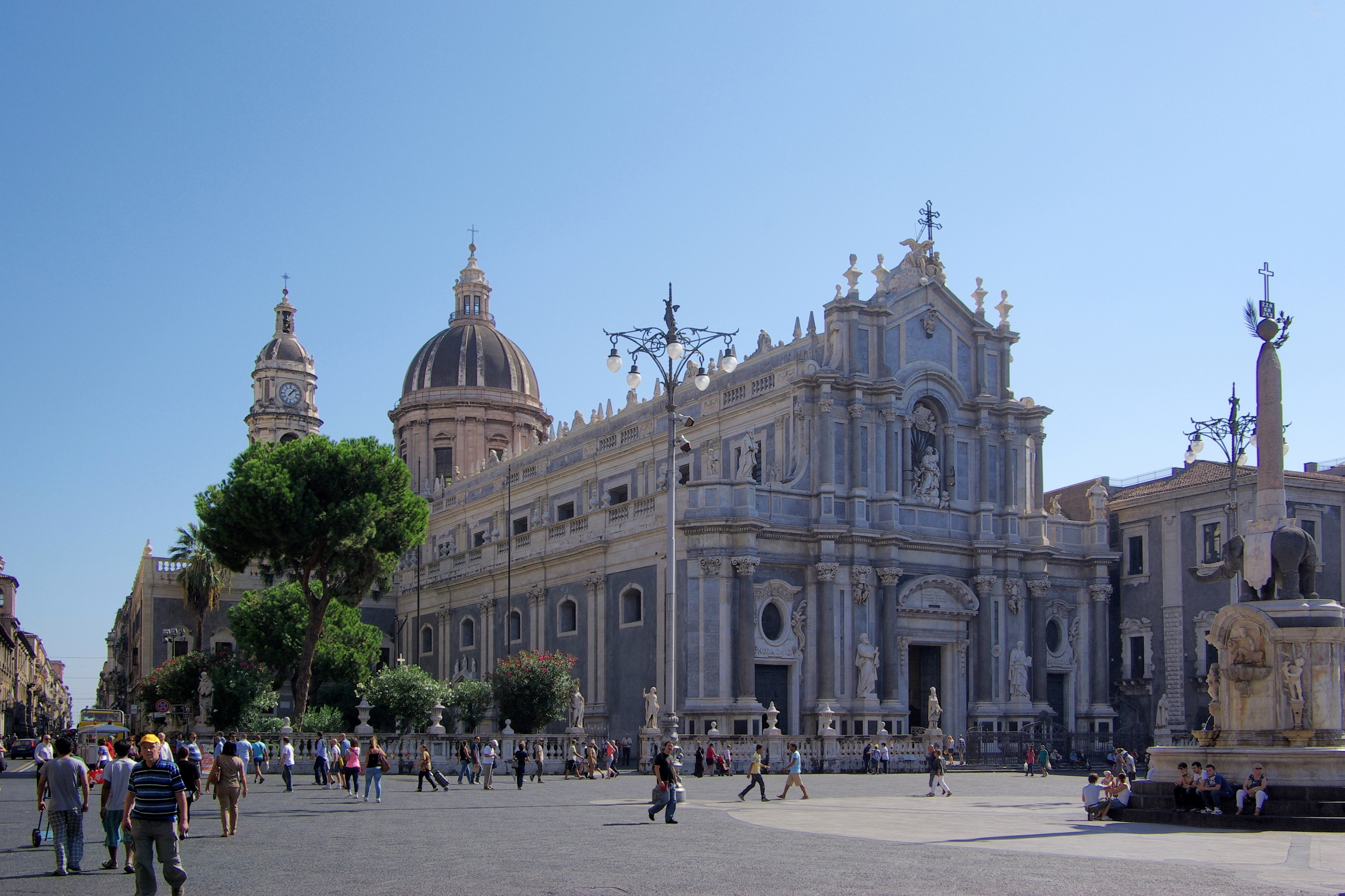
- Skyline of the city with Mount Etna in the background Badia di Sant'Agata Basilica della Collegiata T. Massimo Bellini Roman Theatre of Catania Cathedral and Elephant Fountain

- Flag Coat of arms

- Location within Sicily Location within Italy Location within Europe
- Coordinates: 37°30′0″N 15°5′25″E
- Country: Italy
- Region: Sicily
- Metropolitan city: Catania (CT)
- Frazioni: Bicocca, Codavolpe, Junghetto, Pantano d'Arci, Paradiso degli Aranci, Passo Cavaliere, Passo del Fico, Passo Martino, Primosole, Reitano, Vaccarizzo, Villaggio Delfino

Government
  - Mayor: Enrico Trantino (Brothers of Italy)

Area
  - Total: 182.90 km^{2} (70.62 sq mi)
- Elevation: 7 m (23 ft)

Population (2026)
  - Total: 296,984
  - Density: 1,623.8/km^{2} (4,205.5/sq mi)
- Demonym: Catanese
- Time zone: UTC+1 (CET)
  - Summer (DST): UTC+2 (CEST)
- Postal code: 95131
- Dialing code: 095
- ISTAT code: 087015
- Patron saint: St. Agatha
- Saint day: 5 February
- Website: www.comune.catania.it

UNESCO World Heritage Site
- Part of: Late Baroque Towns of the Val di Noto (South-Eastern Sicily)
- Criteria: Cultural: (i)(ii)(iv)(v)
- Reference: 1024rev-002
- Inscription: 2002 (26th Session)
- Area: 38.5 ha (4,140,000 sq ft)
- Buffer zone: 80.13 ha (8,625,000 sq ft)

Catania (/kəˈtɑːniə/, UK also /-ˈteɪn-/, US also /-ˈtæn-/; Sicilian and Italian: [kaˈtaːnja]) is the second-largest city in the autonomous island region of Sicily in Italy, after Palermo, both by area and by population. Despite being the second largest city of the island, Catania is the centre of the most densely populated Sicilian conurbation, which is among the largest in Italy. It has important road and rail transport infrastructures, and hosts the main airport of Sicily (fifth-largest in Italy). The city is located on Sicily's east coast, facing the Ionian Sea at the base of the active volcano Mount Etna. It is the capital of the 58-municipality province known as the Metropolitan City of Catania, which is the seventh-largest metropolitan area in Italy. The population of the city proper is 296,984, while the population of the metropolitan city is 1,067,550.

Catania was founded in the 8th century BC by Chalcidian Greeks in Magna Graecia. The city has weathered multiple geologic catastrophes: it was almost completely destroyed by a catastrophic earthquake in 1169. A major eruption and lava flow from nearby Mount Etna nearly swamped the city in 1669 and it suffered severe devastation from the 1693 Sicily earthquake.

During the 14th century, and into the Renaissance period, Catania was one of Italy's most important cultural, artistic and political centres. It was the site of Sicily's first university, founded in 1434. It has been the native or adopted home of some of Italy's most famous artists and writers, including the composers Vincenzo Bellini and Giovanni Pacini, and the writers Giovanni Verga, Luigi Capuana, Federico De Roberto and Nino Martoglio.

Catania today is the industrial, logistical, and commercial centre of Sicily. Its airport, the Catania–Fontanarossa Airport, is the largest in Southern Italy. The central "old town" of Catania features exuberant late-baroque architecture, constructed following the 1693 earthquake, and is a UNESCO World Heritage Site.

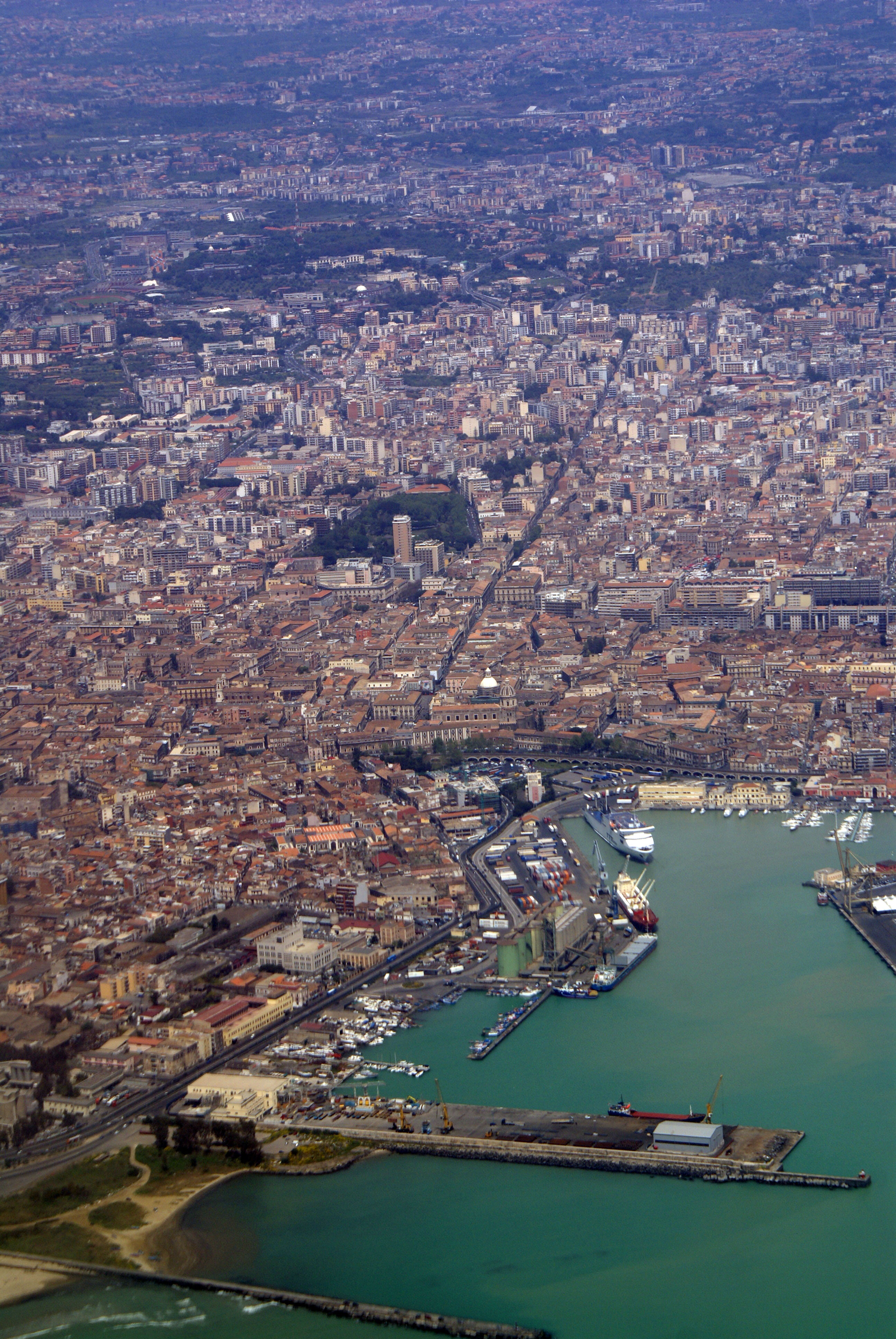
An aerial view of the port of Catania

== Etymology ==
The ancient indigenous population of Sicily, the Sicels, named their villages after geographical attributes of their location. The Siculian word katane means "grater, flaying knife, skinning place" or a "crude tool apt to pare". Other translations of the name are "harsh lands", "uneven ground", "sharp stones", or "rugged or rough soil". The latter etymologies are easily justifiable since, for many centuries following an eruption, the city has always been rebuilt within its black-lava landscape.

Around 263 BC, the city was variously known as Catĭna (Latin: [ˈkatɪna]) and Catăna (Latin: [ˈkatana]; Ancient Greek: Κατάνη [katánɛː]). (Note: Roman writers fluctuate between the two forms Catana and Catina, of which the latter is, perhaps, the most common, and is supported by inscriptions (Orell. 3708, 3778); but the analogy of the Greek Κατάνη, and the modern Catania, would point to the former as the more correct.) The former has been primarily used for its supposed assonance with catina, the Latin feminization of the name catinus. Catinus has two meanings: "a gulf, a basin or a bay" and "a bowl, a vessel or a trough", thanks to the city's distinctive topography.

Around 900, when Catania was part of the emirate of Sicily, it was known in Arabic as Balad al-fīl (بلد الفيل) and Madīnat al-fīl (مدينة الفيل), respectively meaning "the Village (or Country) of the Elephant" and "the City of the Elephant". The Elephant likely referred to the ancient lava sculpture, now placed over the fountain in Piazza Duomo. The sculpture is most likely a prehistoric sculpture that was reforged during the Byzantine Era, prized as a protective talisman against enemies, both human, natural or geologic. Another Arab toponym was Qaṭāniyyah (قطانية), allegedly from the Arabic word for the "leguminous plants". Pulses like lentils, beans, peas, broad beans, and lupins were chiefly cultivated in the plains around the city well before the arrival of Aghlabids. Afterwards, many Arabic agronomists developed these crops and the citrus orchards in the area around the city. The toponym Wādī Mūsá (وادي موسى), or "the Valley of Moses" (from the Arabic name of the Simeto River), was rarely used.

== History ==
=== Foundation ===
Around 729 BC, the ancient village of Katane was occupied by Chalcidian Greek settlers from nearby Naxos along the coast. It became the Chalcidian colony of Katánē under a leader named Euarchos (Euarchus) and the native population was rapidly Hellenised.

Thucydides states that it came into existence slightly later than Leontini (modern Lentini), which he claims was five years after Syracuse, or 730 BC.

The settlement's acropolis was on the hill of Monte Vergine, a defensible hill immediately west of the current city centre. The port of Catania appears to have been much frequented in ancient time and was the chief place of export for the corn of the rich neighbouring plains.

=== Greek Catania ===
Catania was associated with the ancient legend of Amphinomos and Anapias, who, on occasion of a great eruption of Etna, abandoned all their property and carried off their aged parents on their shoulders. The stream of lava itself was said to have parted, and flowed aside so as not to harm them. Statues were erected to their honour, and the place of their burial was known as the Campus Piorum; the Catanaeans even introduced the figures of the youths on their coins, and the legend became a favorite subject of allusion and declamation among the Latin poets, of whom the younger Lucilius and Claudian have dwelt upon it at considerable length.

The Greek polis of Catania appears to have been a local center of learning. The philosopher and legislator Charondas (late 6th c. BC), born in Catania, putatively wrote a program of laws used here and in other Chalcidic cities, both in Sicily and through Magna Graecia, suggesting a link between Catania and other cities during this time. The poets Ibycus and Stesichorus (c. 630–555 BC) lived in Catania. The latter putatively was buried in a magnificent sepulchre outside one of the gates, therefore named Porta Stesichoreia. Xenophanes (c. 570–475 BC), one of the founders of the Eleatic school of philosophy, also spent the latter years of his life in the city. The first introduction of dancing to accompany the flute was also ascribed to Andron, a citizen of Catania.

Catania appears to have remained independent until the conquest by the despot Hieron of Syracuse; in 476 BC, who expelled all the original inhabitants of Catania and replaced them with his subjects from the town of Leontini – said to have numbered no less than 10,000, consisting partly of Syracusans and Peloponnesians. Hieron changed the city's name to Αἴτνη (Aítnē, Aetna or Ætna, after the nearby Mount Etna, and proclaimed himself the Oekist or founder of the new city. For this he was celebrated by Pindar, and after his death he received heroic honours from the citizens of his new colony.

A few years after the death of Hieron and the expulsion of Thrasybulus of Syracuse, the Syracusans combined with Ducetius, king of the Sicels, to expel the newly settled inhabitants of Catania, who went on to settle in the fortress of Inessa (to which they gave the name Aetna). The old Chalcidic citizens returned to the city in 461 BC.

The period that followed appears to have been one of great prosperity for Catania, as well as for the Sicilian cities in general.

In 415 BC, Catania became involved with the expedition to Sicily pursued by the Athenians to punish Syracuse. Initially the Catanaeans refused to allow the Athenians into their city, but after the latter had forced an entrance, the Athenian leader Alcibiades made a famous speech in front of the assembly. Catania became an ally, and the headquarters of the Athenian army for the first year of the expedition, and a base of their subsequent operations against Syracuse. After the defeat of the Athenians, Catania was again threatened by Syracuse. In 403 BC, Dionysius I of Syracuse plundered the city, sold its citizens as slaves, and repopulated the town with Campanian mercenaries. However, the Carthaginians would take possession of Catania under Himilco and Mago, after the nearby great naval Battle of Catana (397 BC) where they defeated Leptines of Syracuse, and in 396 BC forcing the local Campanian mercenaries to relocate to Aetna.

Calippus, the assassin of Dion of Syracuse, held Catania for a time (Plut. Dion. 58); and when Timoleon landed in Sicily in 344 BC Catania was subject to the despot Mamercus who at first joined the Corinthian leader, but afterwards abandoned this allegiance for that of the Carthaginians. As a consequence he was attacked and expelled by Timoleon in 338 BC.

Catania was now restored to a fragile independence; changing sides during the wars starting in 311 BC of Agathocles of Syracuse with the Carthaginians. When Pyrrhus landed in Sicily in 278 BC, Catania was the first to open its gates to him, and welcomed him with great splendor.

=== Roman rule ===
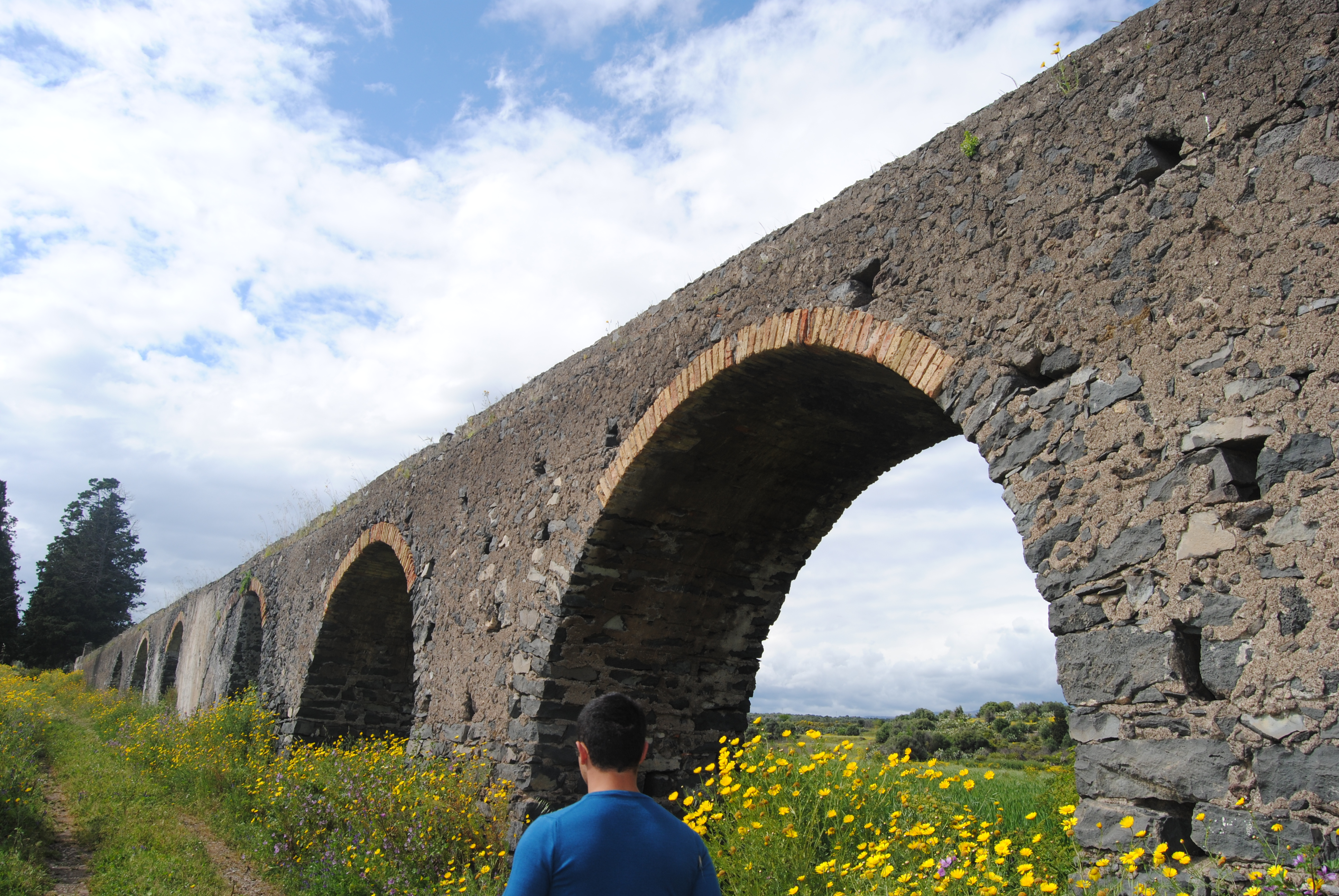
Roman Aqueduct at Valcorrente

During the First Punic War, Catania was one of the first cities of Sicily to submit to the Roman Republic after their first successes in 263 BC when it was taken by Valerius Messalla. A sundial was part of the booty which was placed in the Comitium in Rome. Since then the city became a civitas decumana i.e. was subject to the payment of a tenth of its agricultural income as a tax to Rome. The conqueror of Syracuse, Marcus Claudius Marcellus, built a gymnasium here.

It appears to have continued afterwards to maintain its friendly relations with Rome and though it did not enjoy the advantages of a confederate city (foederata civitas), like its neighbours Tauromenium (modern Taormina) and Messana (modern Messina), it rose to a position of great prosperity under the Roman rule.

Around 135 BC during the First Servile War, it was conquered by rebel slaves.

One of the most serious eruptions of Mount Etna happened in 121 BC, when a great part of Catania was overwhelmed by streams of lava, and the hot ashes fell in such quantities in the city itself, as to break in the roofs of the houses. Catana was in consequence exempted, for 10 years, from its usual contributions to the Roman state. The greater part of the broad tract of plain to the southwest of Catana (now called the Piana di Catania, a district of great fertility), appears to have belonged, in ancient times, to Leontini or Centuripa (modern Centuripe), but that portion of it between Catana itself and the mouth of the Symaethus was annexed to Catana and must have furnished abundant supplies of grain.

Cicero repeatedly mentions it as, in his time, a wealthy and flourishing city; it retained its ancient municipal institutions, its chief magistrate bearing the title of Proagorus; and appears to have been one of the principal ports of Sicily for the export of corn.

In the Sicilian revolt from 44 BC Sextus Pompeius selected Sicily as his base and Catania gave in to Sextus' revolt and joined his forces. Sextus amassed a formidable army and a large fleet of warships at his base at Messana, with many slaves joining from the villas of patricians. After the victory of Augustus in 36 BC much of the vast farmland in Sicily was either ruined or left empty, and much of this land was taken and distributed to members of the legions which had fought there. Catania suffered severely from the ravages but was afterwards one of the cities raised to the status of colony by Augustus which restored its prosperity through the settlement of veterans, so that in Strabo's time it was one of the few cities in the island that was flourishing.

Another revolt led by the gladiator Selurus in 35 BC created mayhem for a while.

The Roman aqueduct of Catania was the longest in Roman Sicily at 24 kilometres (15 mi), starting from the springs of Santa Maria di Licodia.

It retained its colonial rank, as well as its prosperity, throughout the period of the Roman Empire; so that in the 4th century Ausonius in his Ordo Nobilium Urbium, notices Catania and Syracuse alone among the cities of Sicily.

=== Middle Ages ===
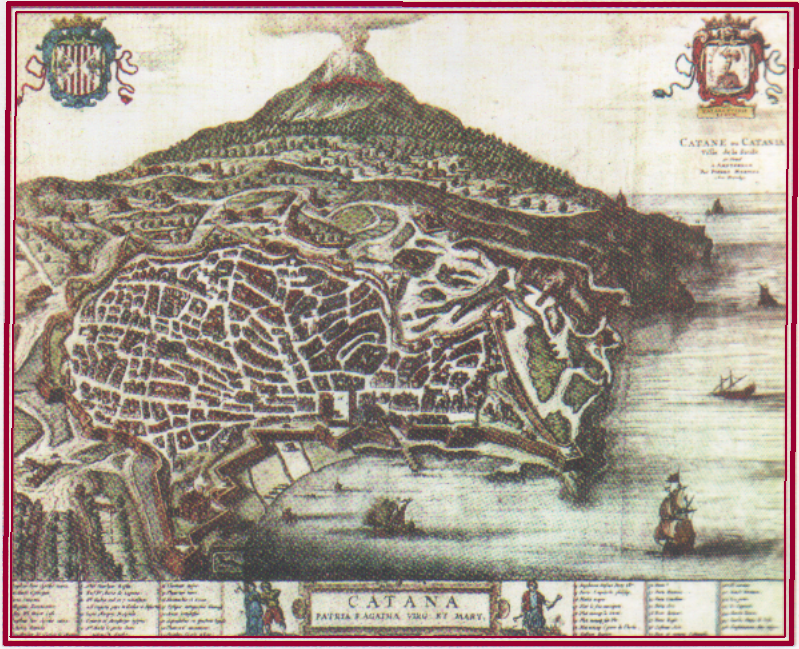
Picture of Catania in 1575

Catania was sacked by the Vandals of Gaiseric in 440–441. After a period under the Ostrogoths, it was reconquered in 535 by the Byzantine Empire, under which it remained until the 9th century. It was the seat of the Byzantine governor of the island.

Catania was under an Islamic emirate for two centuries, after which it fell to the Normans of Roger I of Sicily. Subsequently, the city was ruled by a bishop-count (1072). In 1194–1197 the city was sacked by German soldiers during after the conquest of the island by emperor Henry VI. In 1232 it rebelled to the former's son, Frederick II, who later built a massive castle, Castello Ursino and also made Catania a royal city, ending the dominance of the bishops.

Catania was one of the main centers of the Sicilian Vespers revolt (1282) against the House of Anjou and was the seat of the coronation of the new Aragonese king of Sicily, Peter I. The city remained a key Sicilian port during the War of the Sicilian Vespers. After a civil revolt in 1299, the city was captured by an Angevin army, which occupied the city until the Angevins evacuated their holdings on Sicily in 1302.

In the 14th century it gained importance as it was chosen by the Aragonese as a Parliament and Royal seat. Here, in 1347, it was signed the treaty of peace that ended the long War of the Vesper between Aragonese and Angevines. Catania lost its capital role when, in the early 15th century, Sicily was turned into a member of the Crown of Aragon, and kept its autonomy and original privileges specially during the period from 1282 to 1410.

In 1434 King Alfonso V founded here the Siciliae Studium Generale, the oldest university in the island.

=== Early modern times ===
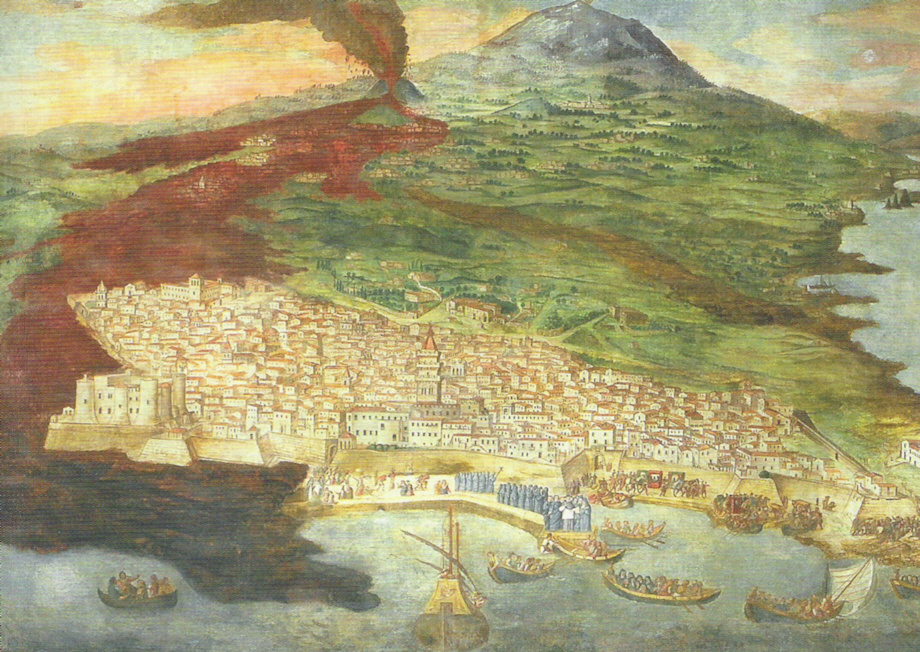
Mount Etna erupting in 1669

With the unification of Castile and Aragon (early 16th century), Sicily became part of the Spanish Empire. It rebelled against the foreign government in 1516 and 1647.

In 1669 the city's surroundings suffered great material damage from the 1669 Etna eruption. The city itself was largely saved by its walls that diverted most of the lava into the port. Afterwards, in 1693 the city was nearly completely destroyed by a heavy 1693 Sicily earthquake and its aftershocks. The city was then rebuilt in the Baroque architecture that nowadays characterizes it.

=== Unified Italy ===
Catania was one of the vanguards of the movement for Sicilian autonomy in the early 19th century.

In 1860 Giuseppe Garibaldi's expedition of the Thousand conquered Sicily for Piedmont from the Kingdom of the Two Sicilies. Since the following year Catania was part of the newly unified Italy, whose history it shares since then.

On 7 October 1884, one of the most violent tornadoes ever recorded struck Catania. The tornado killed 28 people and injured 600. The tornado would remain unrated until 2025, when the European Severe Storms Laboratory upgraded it to IF5 on the International Fujita Scale, being one of 8 to attain this rating, including 2 others in Italy.

The first half of the twentieth century was a cycle of repeated destruction and rebuilding for the city of Catania.

During the years 1923 and 1928, Catania endured two major eruptions of Mt. Etna. The 1923 eruption lasted twenty-nine days, from 6 June until 29 June. A large lava flow occurred in the 1928 event and was the first to destroy a population center in over two hundred years.

At the onset of World War 1, Italy was part of a defensive alliance with Germany and Austria-Hungary referred to as the Triple Alliance. After one year, Italy joined the Allied forces. Many promises made to secure Italy's help during the war were not kept resulting in stability issues throughout the country leading to the adoption of fascist ideations. As the second World War began, the new regime opted to support Adolf Hitler, resulting in Catania and all the surrounding areas on Sicily being destroyed by Allied bombing.

During World War II, Catania was heavily bombed by the Allied air forces, owing to the presence of two of the main Axis airfields in Sicily (Gerbini and Fontanarossa) and for its strategically important port and marshalling yard. Altogether, the city suffered eighty-seven air raids. The heaviest took place in the spring and summer of 1943, before and during the Allied invasion of Sicily; they caused heavy damage to the city (among others, twenty-eight churches and most historic palaces suffered damage), killed 750 inhabitants and prompted most of the population to flee to the countryside. After heavy fighting across eastern Sicily, Catania was eventually captured by the British 8th Army on 5 August 1943.

After the conflict, and the constitution of the Italian Republic (1946), Catania attempted to catch up with the economic and social development of Italy's richer northern regions. The problems faced in Catania were emblematic of those faced by other towns in the Mezzogiorno, namely a heavy gap in industrial development and infrastructures, and the threat of the mafia. This notwithstanding, during the 1960s (and partly during the 1990s) Catania enjoyed development and a period of economic, social, and cultural success. In the first decade of the 21st century, Catania's economic and social development somewhat faltered and the city is again facing economic and social stagnation. This was aggravated by the economic crisis left by the Forza Italia administration of mayor Scapagnini in 2008.

== Geography ==
As observed by Strabo, the location of Catania at the foot of Mount Etna has been both a curse and a blessing. On the one hand, violent outbursts of the volcano throughout history have destroyed large parts of the city, while on the other hand the volcanic ashes yield fertile soil, especially suited for the growth of vines. (Strab. vi. p. 269)

Two subterranean rivers run under the city; the Amenano, which surfaces at one single point south of Piazza Duomo, and the Longane (or Lognina).

=== Climate ===
Catania experiences a hot-summer Mediterranean climate (Köppen: Csa). The city has hot summers, one of the hottest in the whole country of Italy. Temperatures of 40 °C (104 °F) are surpassed a couple of times most years.

Winters are among the warmest in Europe. Precipitation is concentrated from October to March, leaving late spring and summer virtually dry. The city receives around 500 millimetres (20 inches) of rain per year, although the amount can vary greatly from year to year, from over 1,200 mm (47 in) to under 250 mm (9.8 in).

During winter nights, lows can occasionally approach freezing. Highs under 10 °C (50 °F) are extremely rare. Snow, due to the presence of Etna that protects the city from the northern winds, is virtually unheard of, but occasional snow flurries have been seen over the decades especially in the hilly districts. More recently, a light snowfall occurred on 9 February 2015, but the last snowfall dates back to 17 December 1988.

Climate data for Catania-Sigonella, 1991–2020 normals, extremes 1960–present
Month	Jan	Feb	Mar	Apr	May	Jun	Jul	Aug	Sep	Oct	Nov	Dec	Year
Record high °C (°F)	25.2 (77.4)	26.0 (78.8)	34.4 (93.9)	34.4 (93.9)	38.4 (101.1)	44.2 (111.6)	46.7 (116.1)	45.0 (113.0)	41.0 (105.8)	38.0 (100.4)	30.6 (87.1)	27.2 (81.0)	46.7 (116.1)
Mean daily maximum °C (°F)	15.9 (60.6)	16.2 (61.2)	18.6 (65.5)	21.4 (70.5)	26.1 (79.0)	31.0 (87.8)	34.1 (93.4)	34.5 (94.1)	30.5 (86.9)	25.8 (78.4)	21.0 (69.8)	17.0 (62.6)	24.3 (75.7)
Daily mean °C (°F)	10.2 (50.4)	10.3 (50.5)	12.4 (54.3)	14.9 (58.8)	19.2 (66.6)	23.8 (74.8)	26.7 (80.1)	27.3 (81.1)	24.1 (75.4)	20.0 (68.0)	15.4 (59.7)	11.6 (52.9)	18.1 (64.6)
Mean daily minimum °C (°F)	4.8 (40.6)	4.8 (40.6)	6.4 (43.5)	8.6 (47.5)	12.3 (54.1)	16.6 (61.9)	19.4 (66.9)	20.3 (68.5)	18.2 (64.8)	14.6 (58.3)	10.0 (50.0)	6.5 (43.7)	11.9 (53.4)
Record low °C (°F)	−5.0 (23.0)	−5.6 (21.9)	−3.2 (26.2)	0.0 (32.0)	3.0 (37.4)	8.4 (47.1)	11.6 (52.9)	13.8 (56.8)	10.0 (50.0)	4.0 (39.2)	−1.1 (30.0)	−2.2 (28.0)	−5.6 (21.9)
Average precipitation mm (inches)	64.1 (2.52)	46.1 (1.81)	42.6 (1.68)	29.9 (1.18)	17.9 (0.70)	11.0 (0.43)	7.8 (0.31)	9.8 (0.39)	50.5 (1.99)	59.4 (2.34)	66.2 (2.61)	78.5 (3.09)	483.8 (19.05)
Average precipitation days (≥ 1 mm)	6.3	5.7	5.6	4.7	2.6	1.4	0.7	1.5	4.6	5.2	6.2	7.8	52.1
Average relative humidity (%)	75.2	72.3	71.4	70.4	67.2	64.6	63.1	64.2	69.4	73.8	76.1	76.4	70.3
Average dew point °C (°F)	3.8 (38.8)	3.3 (37.9)	5.1 (41.2)	7.2 (45.0)	10.7 (51.3)	13.6 (56.5)	15.8 (60.4)	16.6 (61.9)	14.8 (58.6)	12.1 (53.8)	8.6 (47.5)	5.4 (41.7)	9.7 (49.6)
Mean monthly sunshine hours	172.1	183.4	235.3	266.1	318.4	381.6	368.9	359.9	278.1	211.7	172.2	182.3	3,129.9
Source 1: NOAA, (Dew Point for 1981–2010)
Source 2: Temperature estreme in Toscana

== Demographics ==
Historical population
Year	Pop.	±%
1861	70,608	—
1871	83,680	+18.5%
1881	101,135	+20.9%
1901	147,700	+46.0%
1911	207,848	+40.7%
1921	252,840	+21.6%
1931	225,169	−10.9%
1936	244,972	+8.8%
1951	299,629	+22.3%
1961	363,928	+21.5%
1971	400,048	+9.9%
1981	380,328	−4.9%
1991	333,075	−12.4%
2001	313,110	−6.0%
2011	293,902	−6.1%
2021	301,104	+2.5%
Source: ISTAT

As of 2026, the population is 296,984, of which 48.3% are male, and 51.7% are female. Minors make up 16.4% of the population, and seniors make up 24.0%.

=== Immigration ===
As of 2025, immigrants make up 5.9% of the population. The 5 largest foreign countries of birth are Sri Lanka, Romania, Bangladesh, Mauritius, and Senegal.

== Administrative divisions ==
=== City proper ===
The city of Catania proper (comune di Catania) is divided in six administrative areas called circoscrizioni. The current administrative setup was established in 2013, modifying previous setups dating back to 1971, 1978 and 1995.

The six areas are:

1. Centro storico
2. Picanello-Ognina/Barriera-Canalicchio
3. Borgo-Sanzio
4. San Giovanni Galermo-Trappeto-Cibali
5. Monte Po-Nesima/San Leone-Rapisardi
6. San Giorgio-Librino/San Giuseppe La Rena-Zia Lisa-Villaggio Sant'Agata

=== Metropolitan City ===
The City proper (in red, first image) and the Metropolitan area (in red, second image) within the Metropolitan City

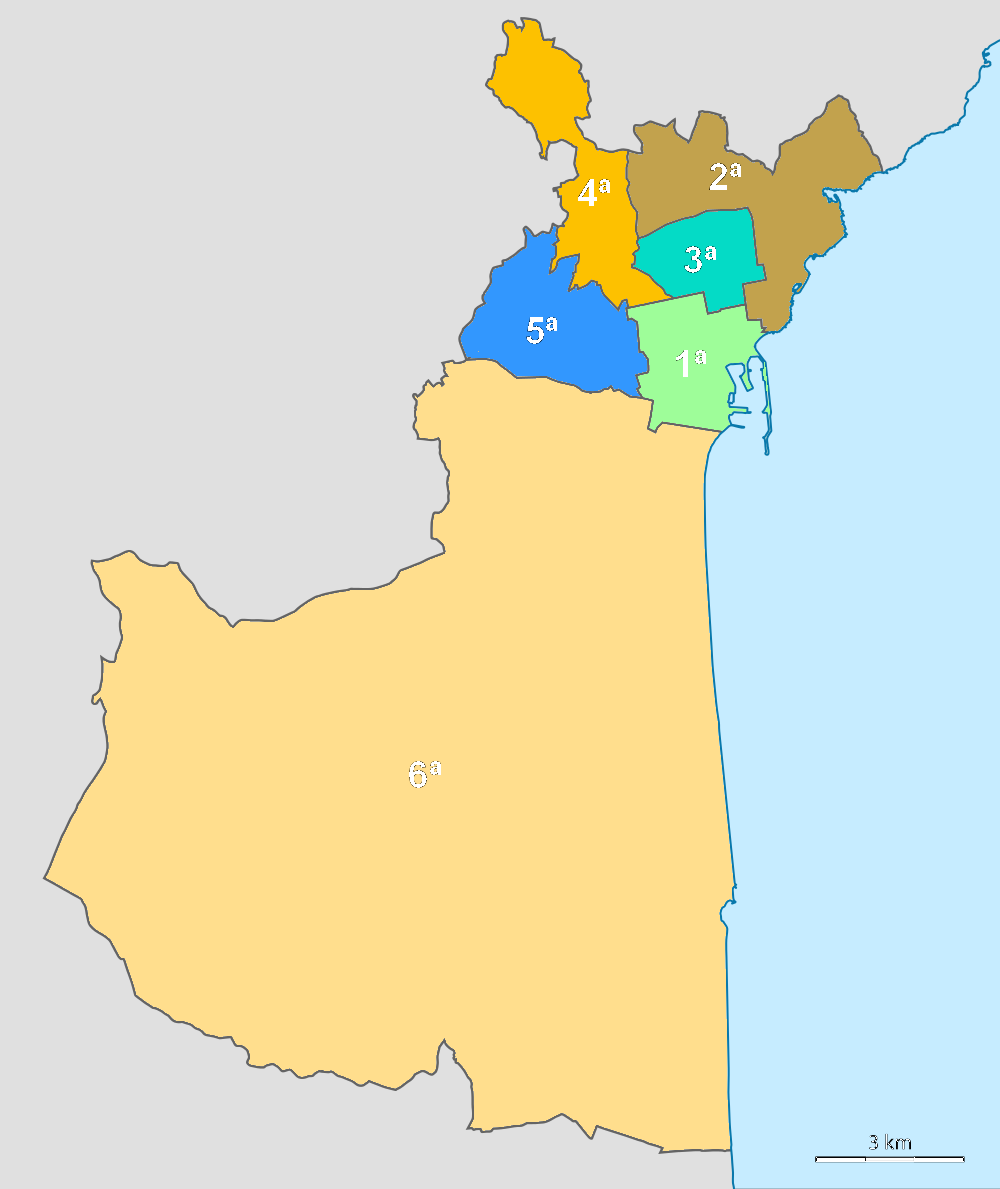
The subdivision of the City proper in six circoscrizioni

The Metropolitan City of Catania was established in 2015 and replaced the former Province of Catania. It includes the city proper and 57 municipalities. The population of the metropolitan city is 1,067,550.

=== Metropolitan area ===
The Metropolitan area of Catania includes the municipality of Catania (311,584 inhabitants) and 26 surrounding municipalities forming an urban belt (498,650 inhabitants). The total population of the Metropolitan area of Catania is therefore 810,234. The municipalities of the Metropolitan area are:

- Aci Bonaccorsi
- Aci Castello
- Aci Catena
- Aci Sant'Antonio
- Acireale
- Belpasso
- Biancavilla
- Camporotondo Etneo
- Catania
- Gravina di Catania
- Mascalucia
- Misterbianco
- Motta Sant'Anastasia
- Nicolosi
- Paternò
- Pedara
- Ragalna
- San Giovanni la Punta
- San Gregorio di Catania
- San Pietro Clarenza
- Sant'Agata li Battiati
- Santa Maria di Licodia
- Santa Venerina
- Trecastagni
- Tremestieri Etneo
- Valverde
- Viagrande
- Zafferana Etnea

== Main sights ==
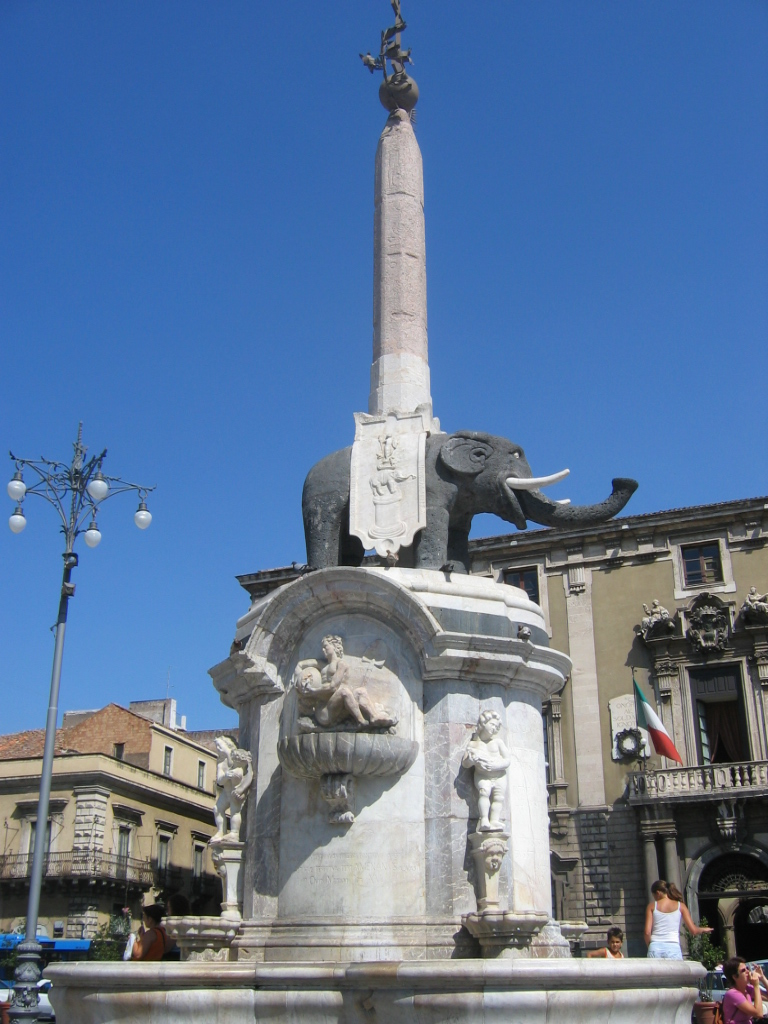
u Liotru, symbol of Catania

The symbol of the city is u Liotru, or the Fontana dell'Elefante, assembled in 1736 by Giovanni Battista Vaccarini. It portrays an ancient lavic stone elephant and is topped by an Egyptian obelisk from Syene. Legend has it that Vaccarini's original elephant was neuter, which the men of Catania took as an insult to their virility. To appease them, Vaccarini appropriately appended elephantine testicles to the original statue.

The Sicilian name u Liotru is a phonetic change of Heliodorus, a nobleman who, after trying without success to become bishop of the city, became a sorcerer and was therefore condemned to the stake. Legend has it that Heliodorus himself was the sculptor of the lava elephant and that he used to magically ride it in his fantastic travels from Catania to Constantinople. Another legend has it that Heliodorus was able to transform himself into an elephant.

The presence of an elephant in the history of Catania is surely connected to both zooarcheology and popular creeds. In fact, the prehistoric fauna of Sicily from the Upper Paleolithic, included dwarf elephants. Paleontologist Othenio Abel suggested that the presence of dwarf elephants in Sicily may be the origin of the legend of the Cyclops. Ancient Greeks, after finding the skulls of dwarf elephants, about twice the size of a human skull, with a large central nasal cavity (mistaken for a large single eye socket) supposed that they were skulls of giants with a single eye.

The Catanian Museum of Mineralogy, Paleontology and Vulcanology holds the integral unburied skeleton of an Elephas falconeri in an excellent state of conservation. The first inhabitants of Etna molded such lavic artifacts to idolize the mythical proboscidian.

=== Classical buildings ===
Over the course of recorded history, the city has been buried by lava seventeen times. Beneath the present-day Catania lie the remains of the Roman city that once stood here, and below that, the earlier Greek settlement. Many ancient Roman monuments were destroyed by these repeated eruptions, but today, visitors can explore surviving ruins in the city centre, which are part of the Parco Archeologico Greco-Romano di Catania.

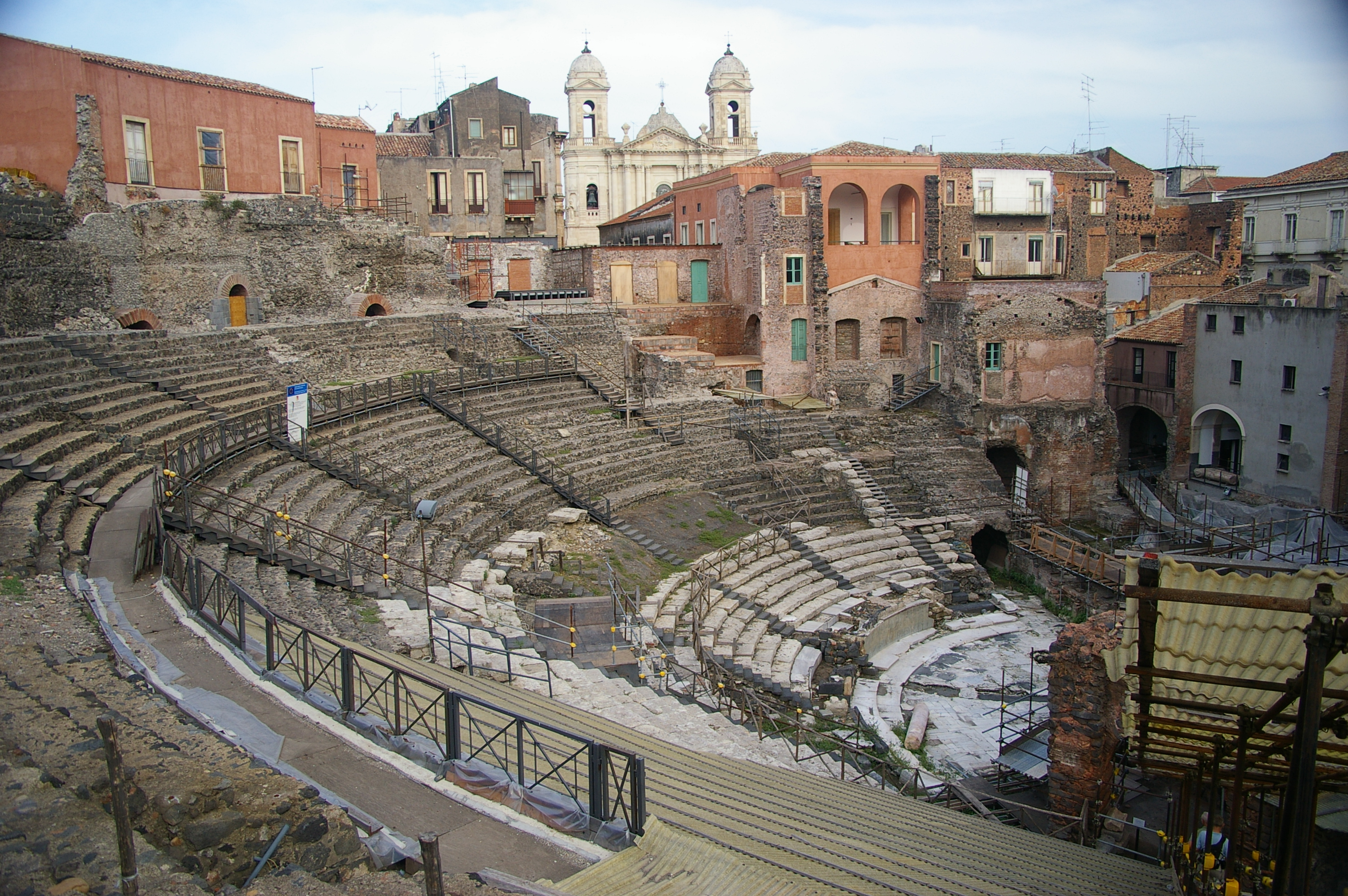
San Francesco d'Assisi all'Immacolata backs Cavea of the Greek-Roman Theatre

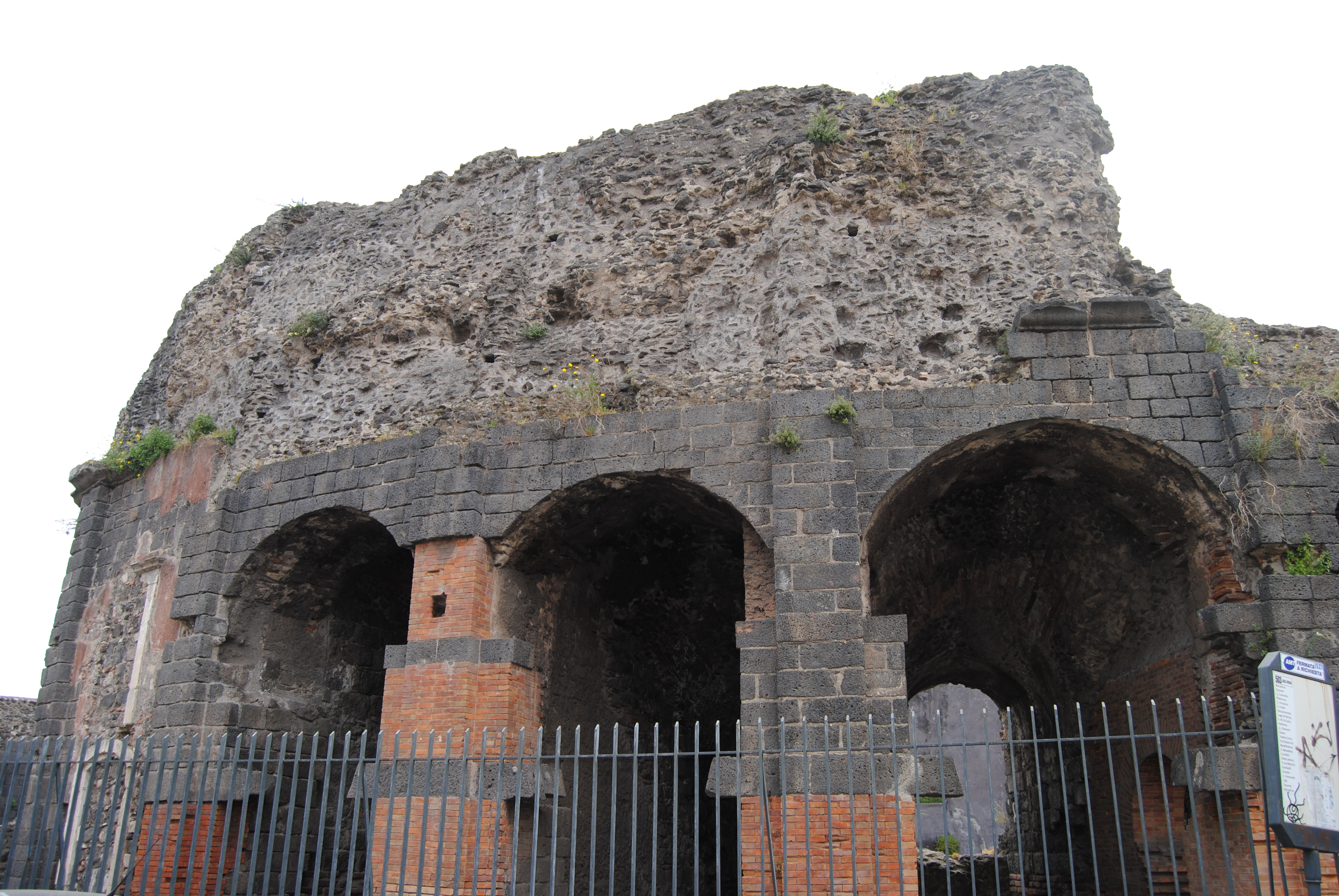
Odeon

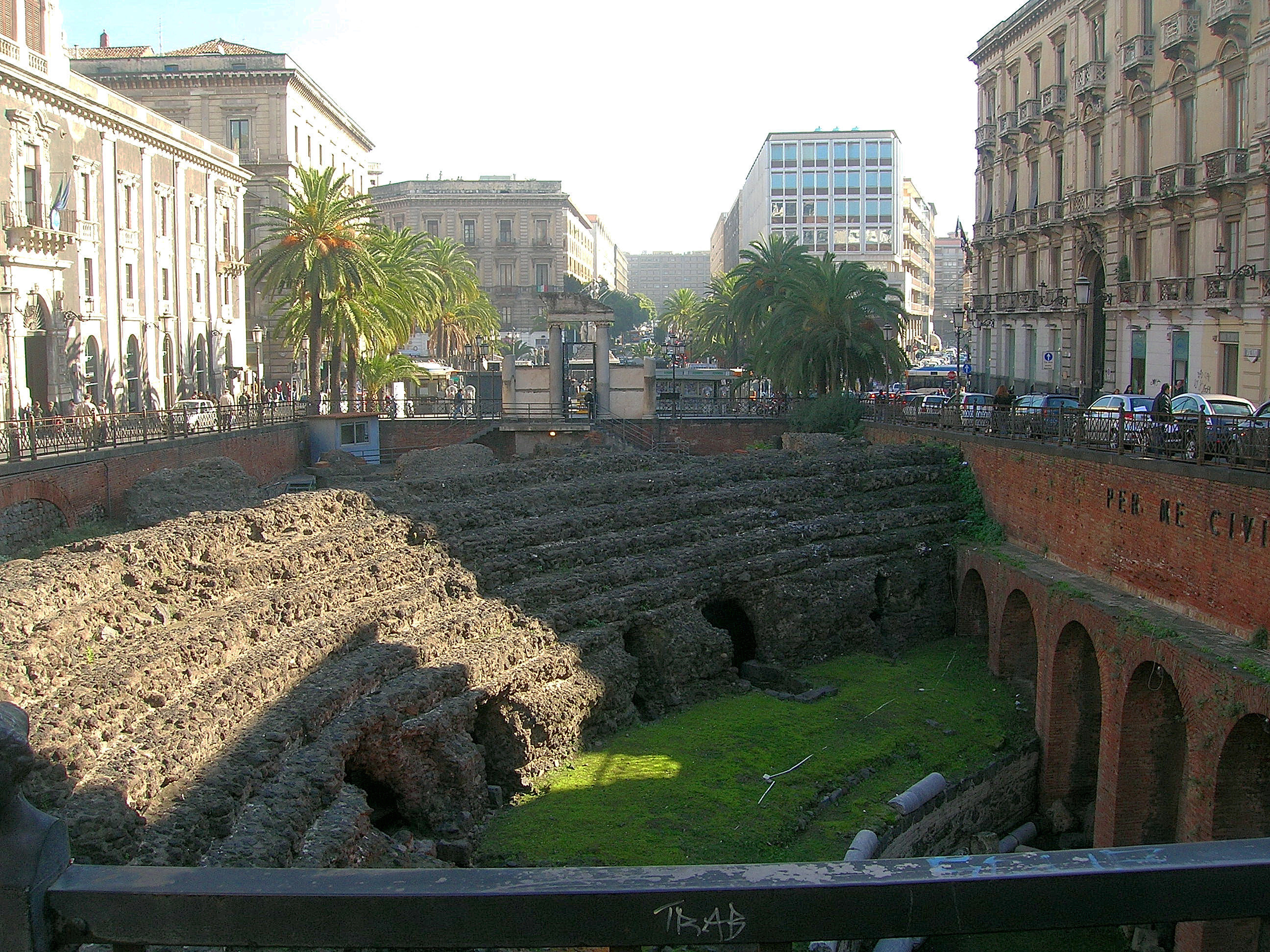
Roman Amphitheatre

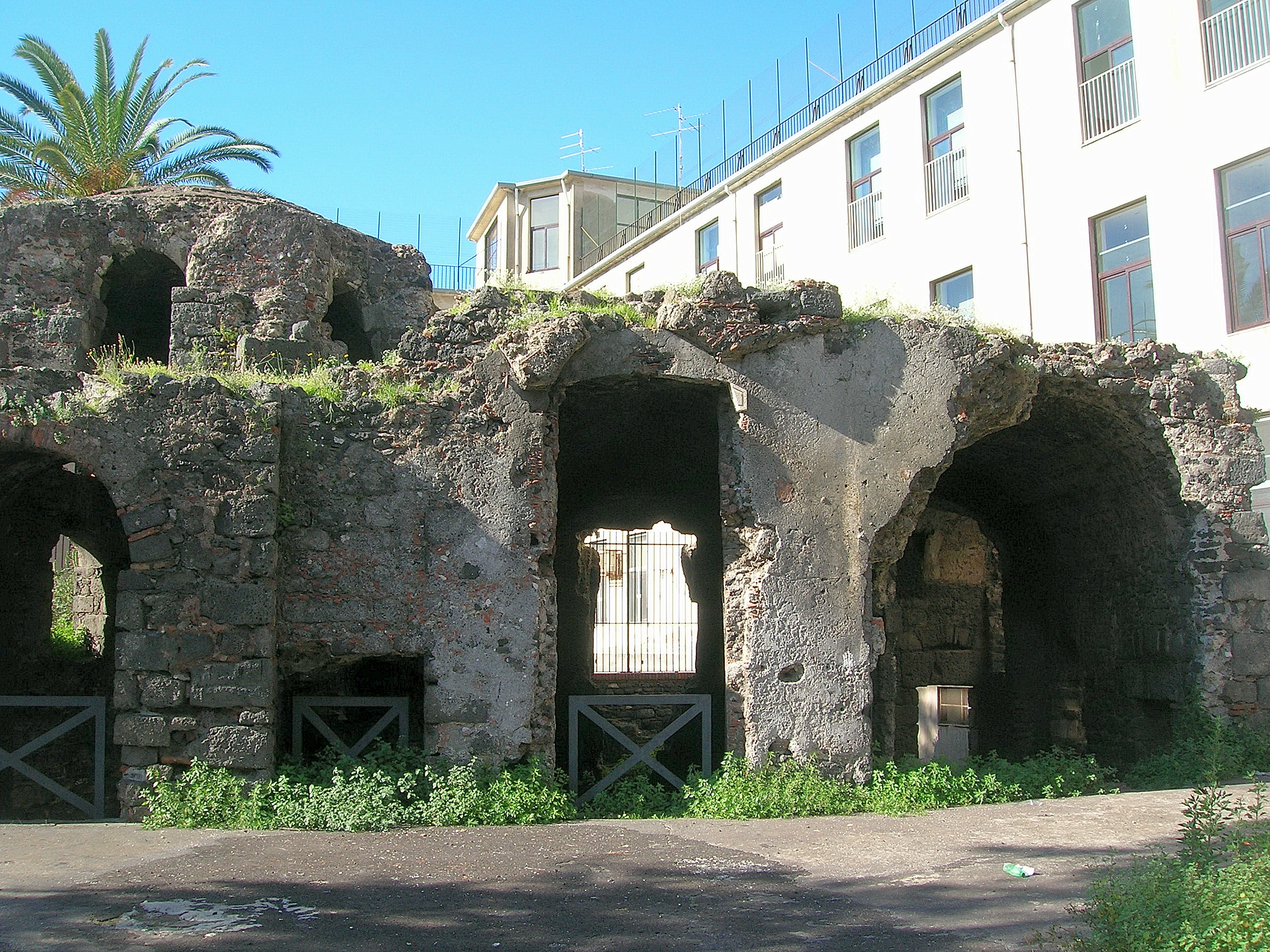
Roman Thermae of Santa Maria dell'Indirizzo

Ancient edifices include:

- Greek-Roman Theatre of Catania and Odeon (2nd to 3rd century CE)
- Amphitheatre of Catania
- Greek Acropolis of Montevergine
- Roman Forum
- Christian basilicas, hypogea, burial monuments, and catacombs
- Thermae
  - Achillean Baths
  - Terme dell'Indirizzo
  - Terme di Santa Maria Odigitria
  - Terme della Rotonda
  - Baths of the Four Quoins
  - Terme di Palazzo Asmundo
  - Terme di Casa Gagliano
  - Terme della Chiesa di Sant'Antonio Abate

=== Baroque and historical churches ===
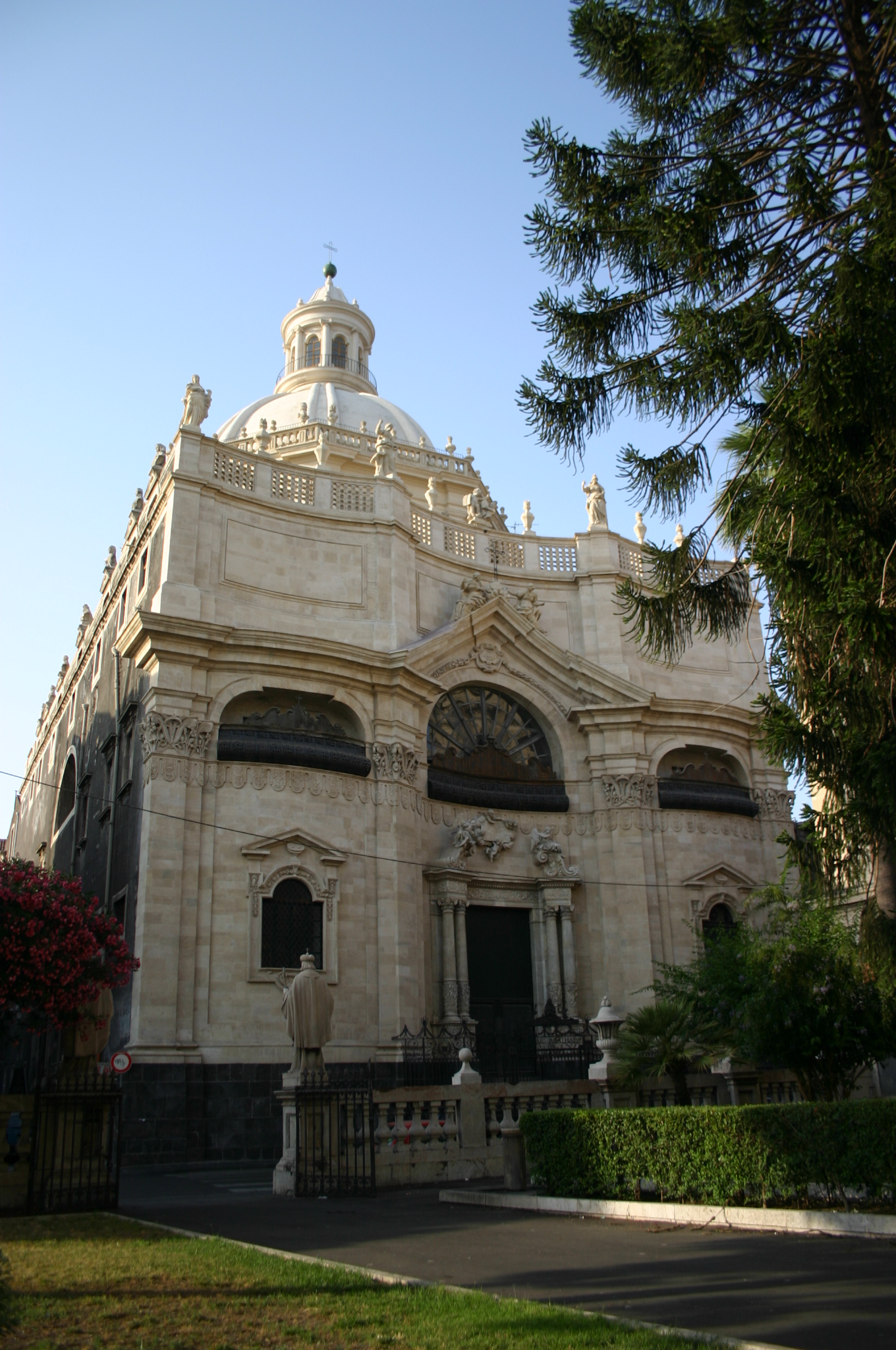
Badìa di Sant'Agata

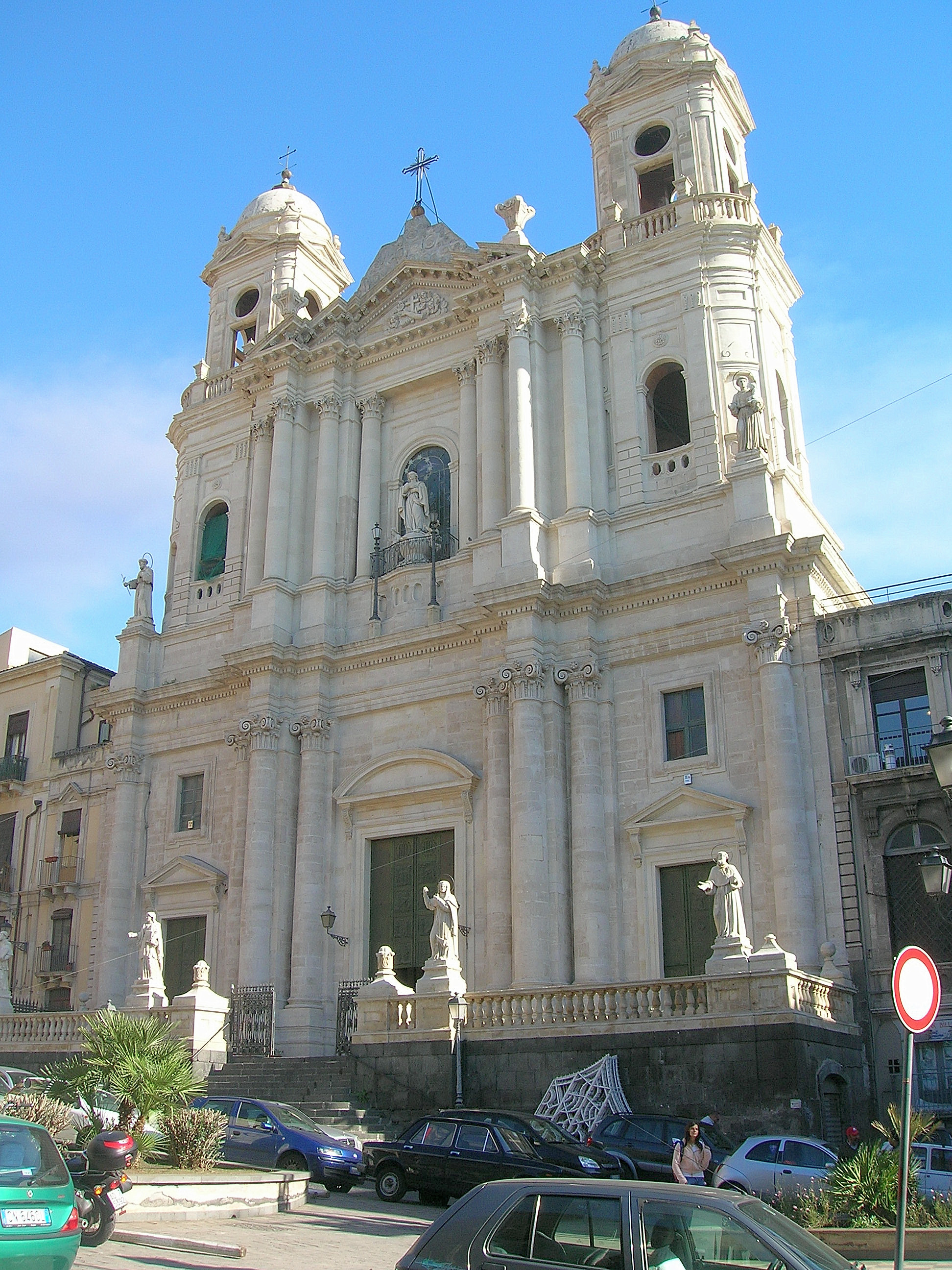
San Francesco d'Assisi all'Immacolata

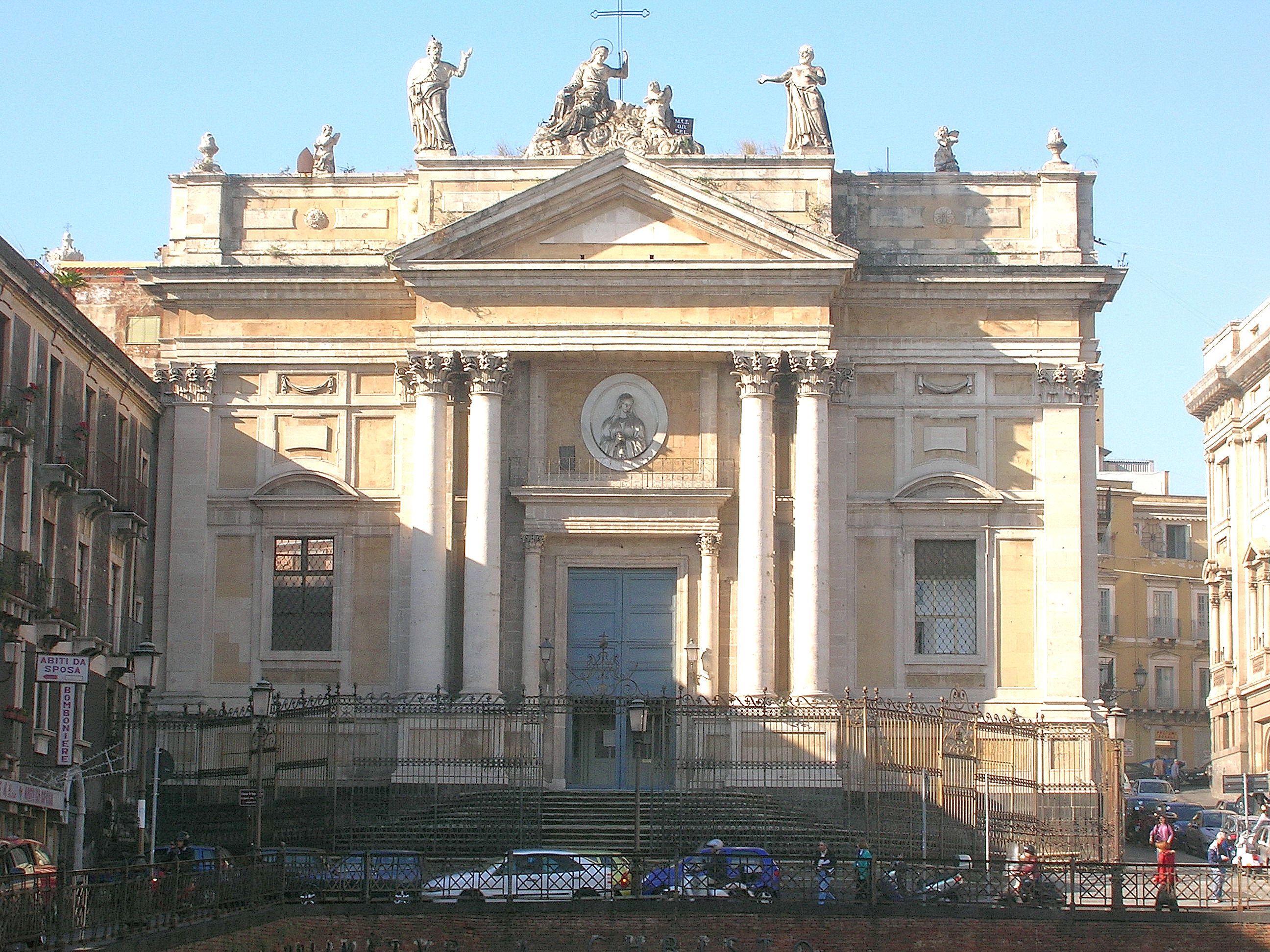
Sant'Agata alla Fornace or San Biagio

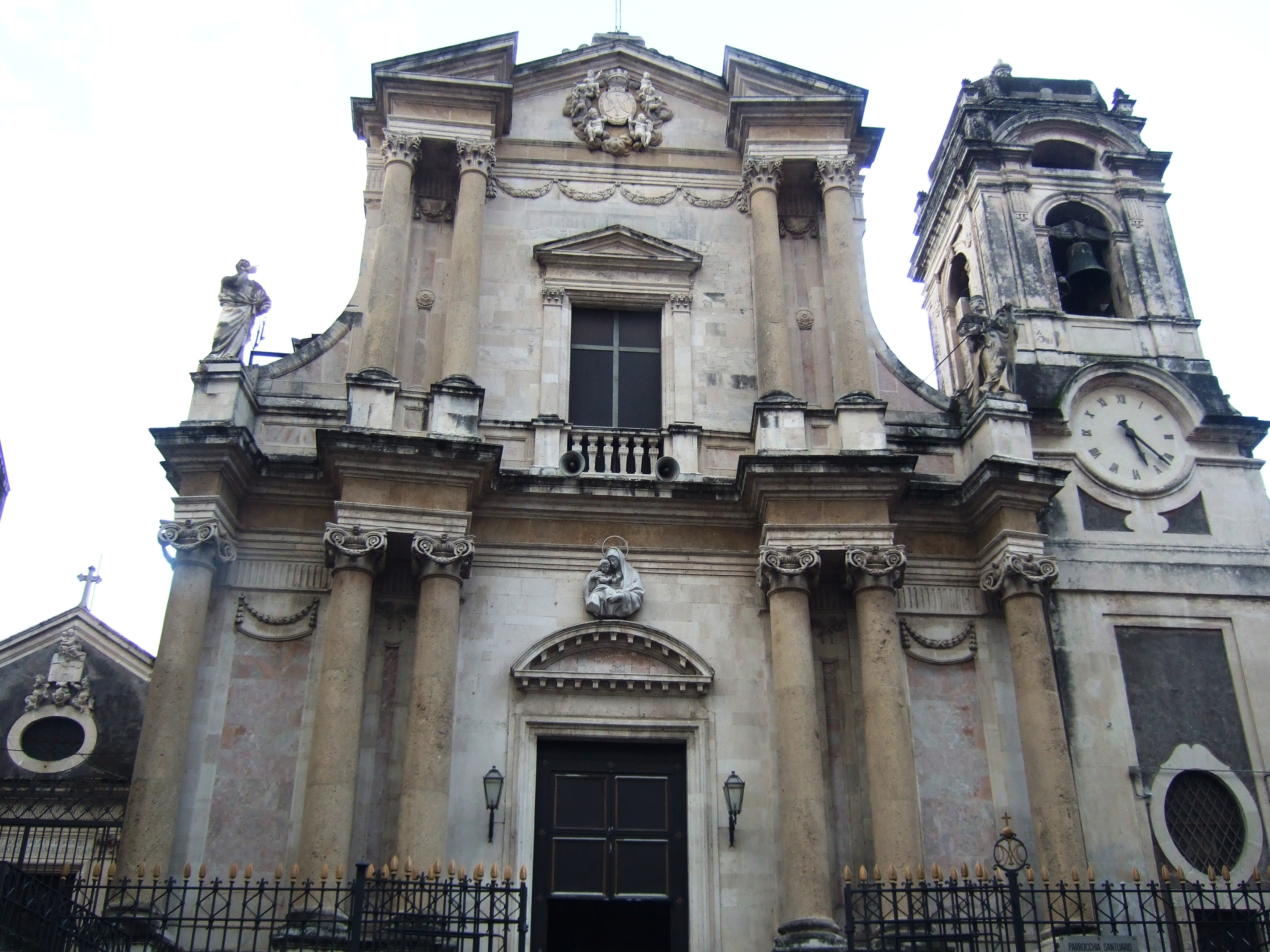
Santa Maria dell'Aiuto

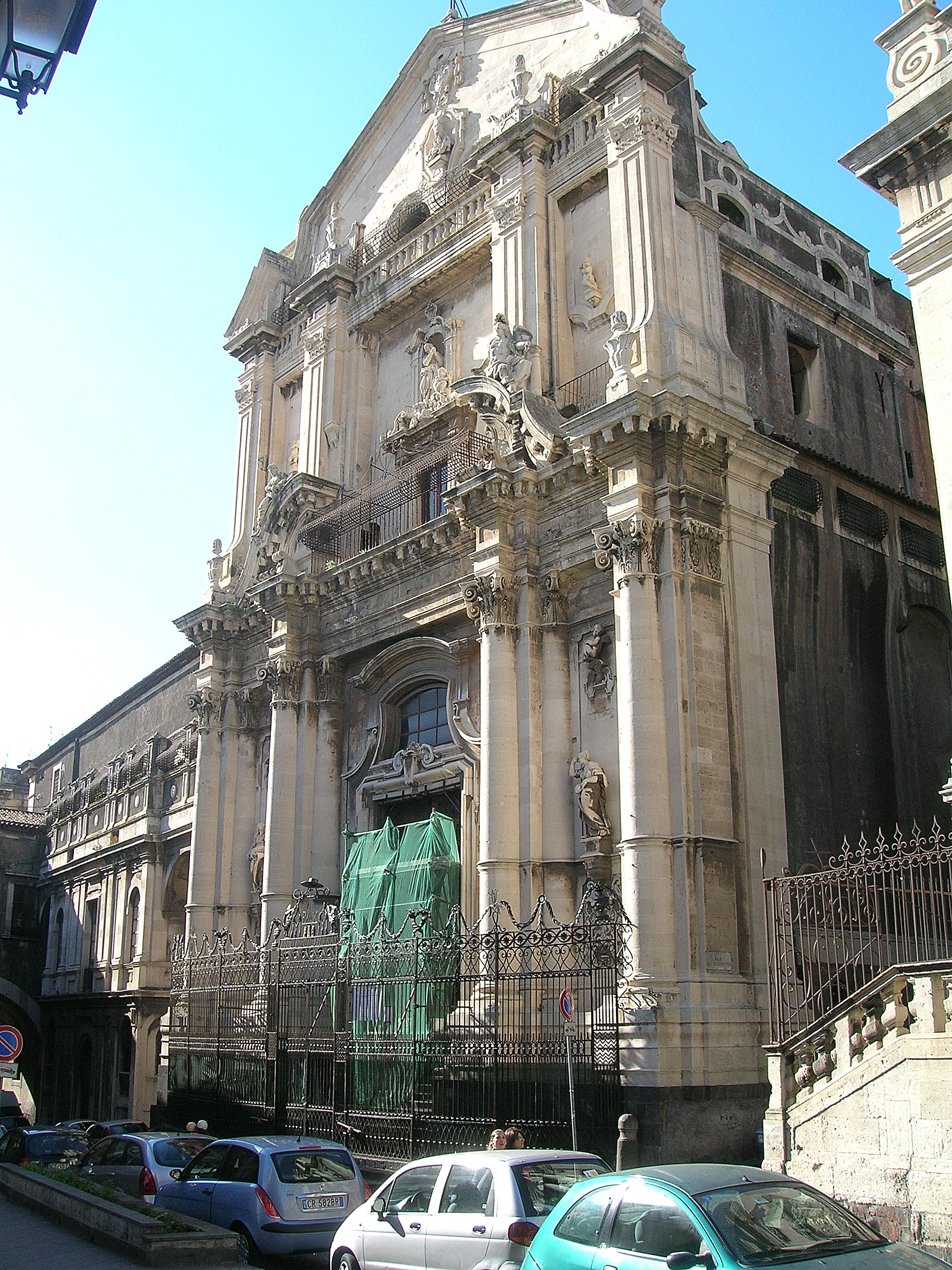
San Benedetto da Norcia

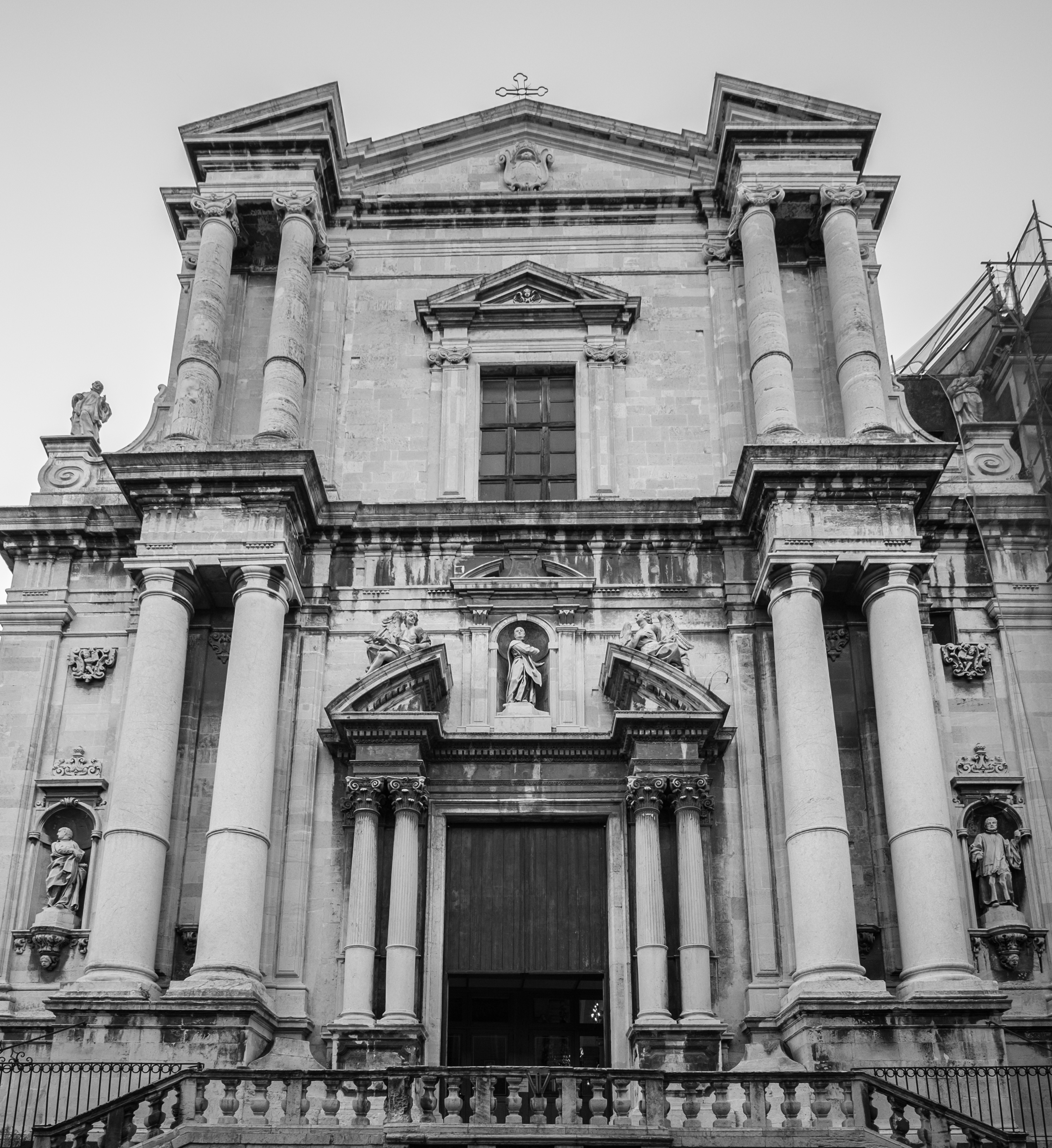
San Francesco Borgia

The Baroque heart of Catania belongs to the Late Baroque Towns of the Val di Noto, a group of cities in southeastern Sicily celebrated for their post-earthquake reconstruction.

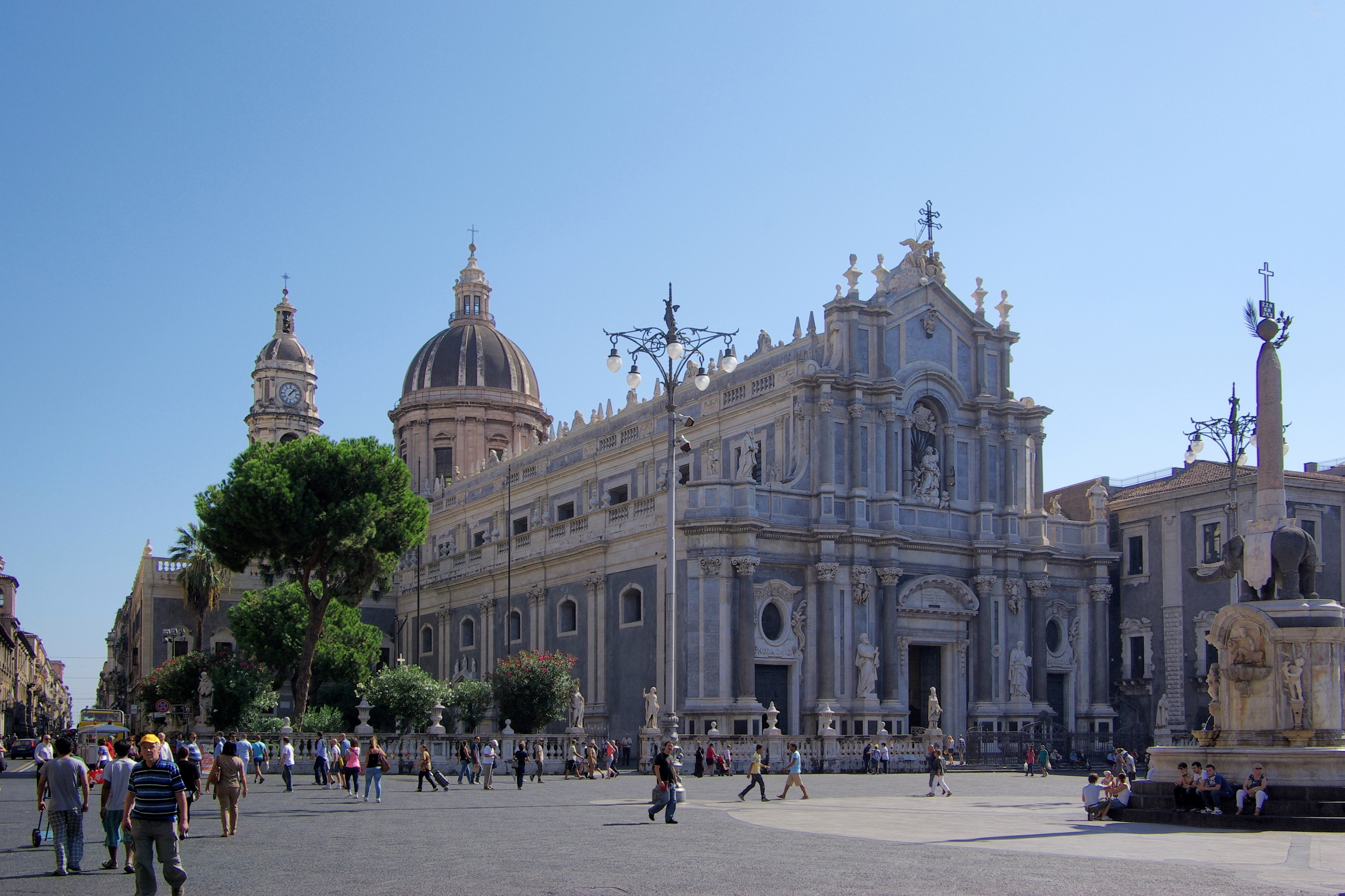
Giovanni Battista Vaccarini's Duomo façade (1736) is an example of the city's Sicilian Baroque architecture.

- Catania Cathedral (1070–1093, rebuilt after 1693 earthquake) built atop Terme Achilliana.
- Sant'Agata, Badia di (1620), church and monastery
- Sant'Agata la Vetere (254) church
- Sant'Agata al Borgo, built 1669, destroyed 1693, rebuilt 1709). The "Borough" (il Borgo) is an inner district of Catania.
- Sant'Agata al Carcere or Santo Carcere (1760). Church built above jail (carcere) where Ste Agatha was allegedly imprisoned during her martyrdom.
- Sant'Agata on the Lavic Runnels
- Sant'Anna church
- San Antonio Abate
- San Benedetto (1704–1713) church and adjacent Badìa Grande e Piccola del Chiostro delle Monache Benedettine
- San Biagio, church formerly called Sant'Agata alla Fornace (1098, rebuilt 1700)
- Basilica della Collegiata, Sicilian Baroque façade by Stefano Ittar
- San Camillo ai Crociferi, church
- Santa Caterina al Rinazzo church
- Santa Chiara (1563) church, and former convent of Poor Clares.
- San Domenico or Santa Maria la Grande (1224), church and convent.
- Sant'Euplio, ruins of church
- San Filippo Neri
- San Francesco d'Assisi all'Immacolata (1329), Franciscan church with tomb of its founding patron, Queen Eleanor of Sicily.
- San Francesco Borgia church and adjacent former Jesuit college.
- San Francesco di Paola
- San Gaetano alle Grotte (260) church
- San Gaetano alla Marina
- San Giovanni Battista, in the suburb of San Giovanni di Galermo.
- San Giuliano church and convent
- San Giuseppe al Duomo church
- San Giuseppe al Transito church
- Madonna del Carmine (1729) Basilica church and sanctuary
- Santa Maria di Gesu church (1465, restored in 1706)
- Santa Maria della Guardia church
- Santa Maria dell'Indirizzo (1730) church
- Santa Maria della Mercede church
- Santa Maria di Ogninella
- Santa Maria della Purità or della Visitazione (1775), church and conservatory
- Santa Maria della Providenza al Borgo, church
- Santa Maria della Rotonda
- Santa Maria del Soccorso or Santa Maria della Palma church
- Santa Maria dell'Aiuto parish church and sanctuary
- Santa Maria dell'Itria or Odigitria, church
- Santa Marta
- San Martino dei Bianchi church
- San Michele the Lesser
- San Michele Arcangelo ai Minoriti (Franciscan) church, a second Minoritelli church is nearby.
- San Nicolò l'Arena (1687), unfinished basilica church and extensive Benedictine Monastery of San Nicolò l'Arena (1558).
- San Nicolas al Borgo
- San Placido (1769) church
- Madonna delle Grazie Chapel
- Santa Rita in Sant'Agostino church
- San Sebastiano (1313)
- Santa Teresa, Carmelitan church and convent.
- Santissima Trinità, church
- Santa Ursula
- Chiesa delle Verginelle di Sant'Agata
- San Vincenzo de' Paoli, church
- Santissimo Sacramento al Borgo church
- Chapel of the Blind's Housing ("Ospizio dei Ciechi")
- Santissimo Sacramento al Duomo, church
- Church of the Holy Child
- Our Lady of Providence
- San Berillo in Santa Maria degli Ammalati, church
- Our Lady of the Poor
- Little Saviour's Byzantine chapel
- Church of the Santissimo Sacramento Ritrovato (1796)
- Sanctuary of Our Lady of Ognina (1308). Ognina is the maritime quarter and the main fishing port in Catania. Many bareboats and sailing vessels gather here all year round. In its close vicinity is a cylindrical tower known as Saint Mary's Tower (Torre Santa Maria), which was restructured in the 16th century to prevent the frequent plundering by the Saracen pirates. The church is the result of the gradual modification of the Greek Temple Athena Longatis or Parthenos Longatis that existed on the steep reef. This cult was described by Tzetses as imported from a Boeotian region of Greece called Longas, which is otherwise unknown. After the earthquake of 1693 it was rebuilt in the same place, but with a different orientation.
- Our Lady of Montserrat (1755)
- Saint Mary of La Salette
- Our Lady of Concordia
- Our Lady of Consolation
- Santissimo Crocifisso Maiorana church
- Crucifix of Miracles
- Crucifix of Good Death
- Our Lady of La Mecca
- Most Holy Redeemer
- Divina Maternità church
- Chapel of Mary Auxiliatrix
- Chapel of the Sacred Heart of Jesus church
- Sacro Cuore al Fortino (1898) church
- Saints George and Denis
- Sacred Heart Church of the Capuchins
- Saint Christopher
- Saints Cosmas and Damian
- Saint Vitus
- Santi Angeli Custodi church
- Santissimo Salvatore church

=== Other ===
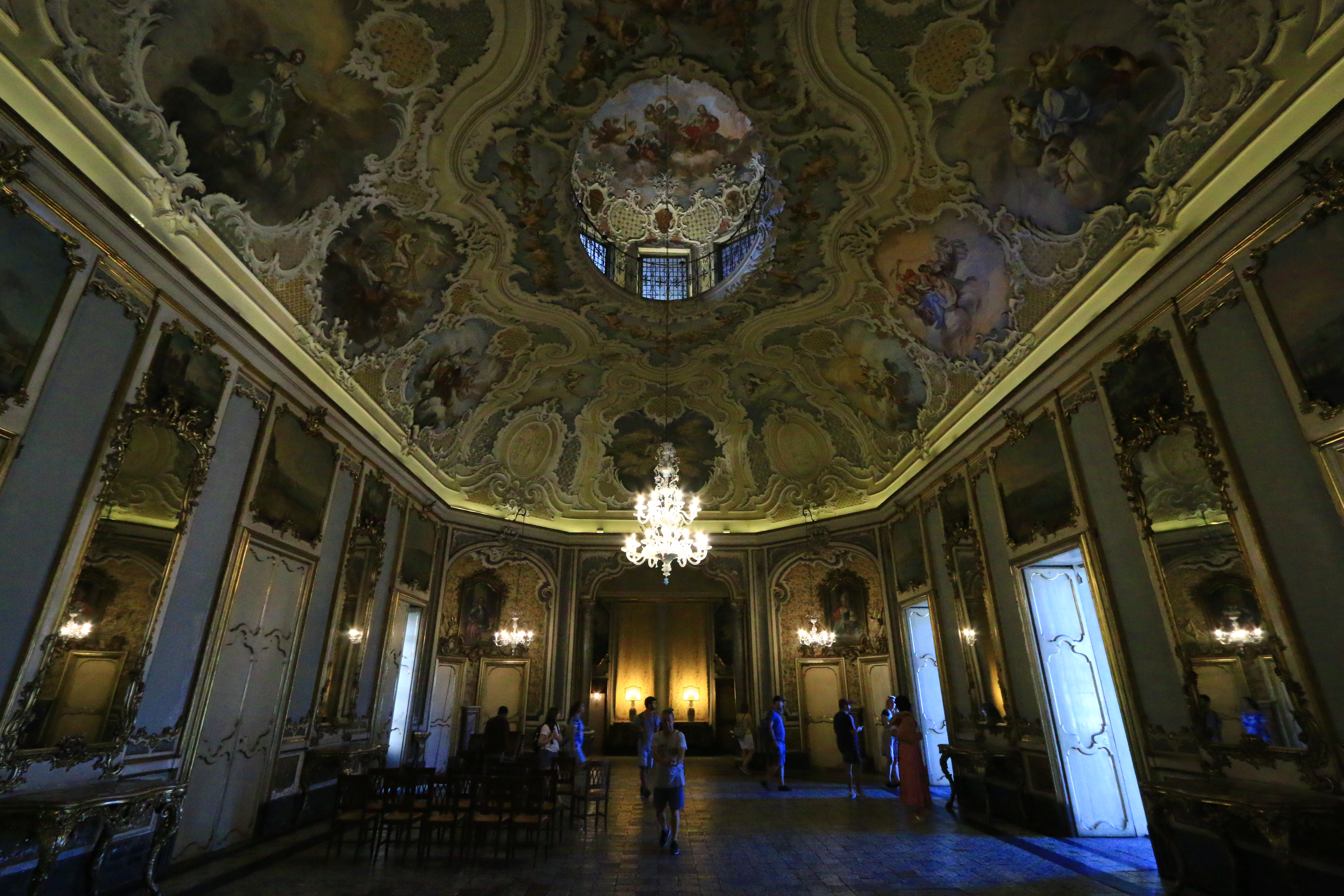
Palazzo Biscari

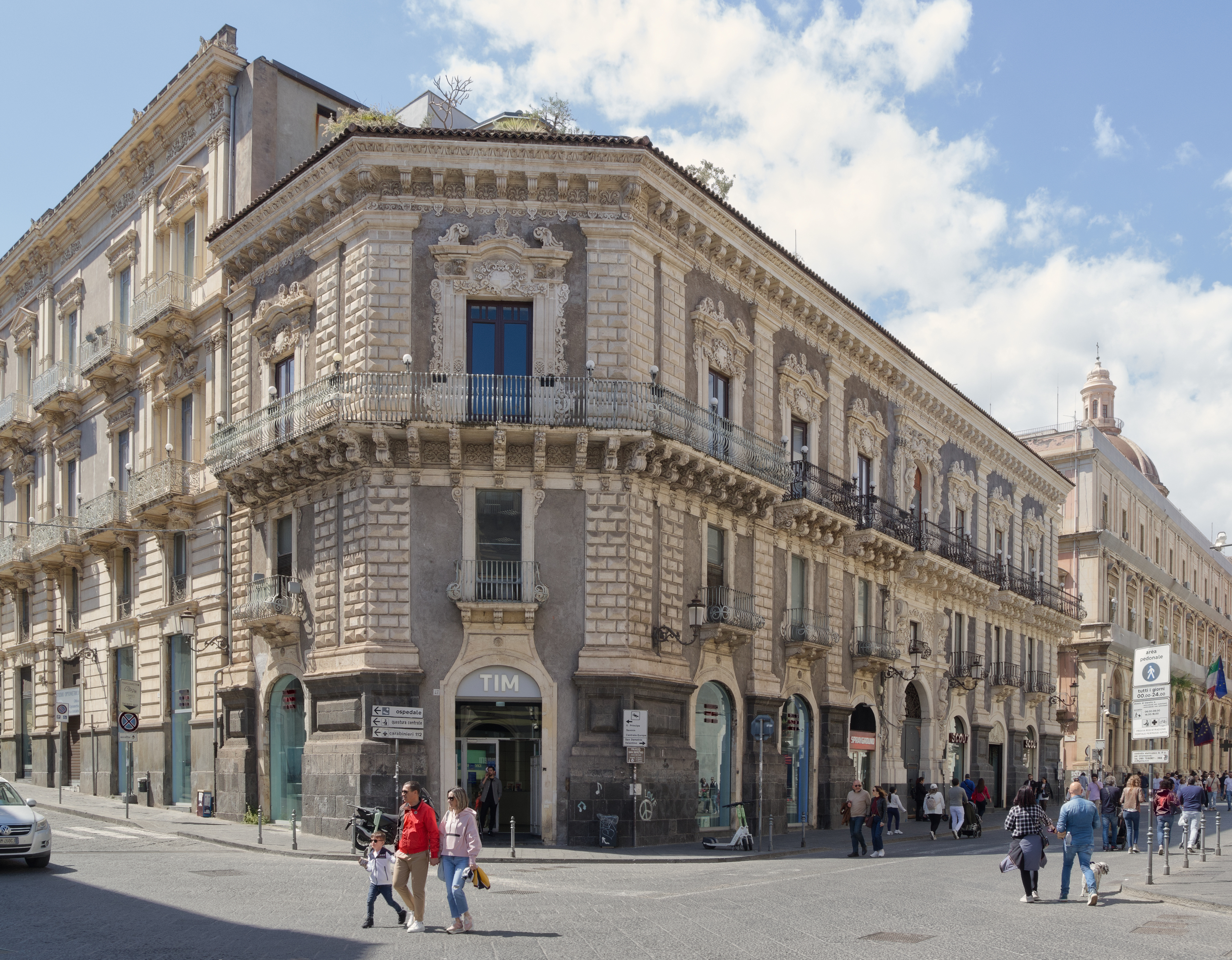
Palazzo San Demetrio

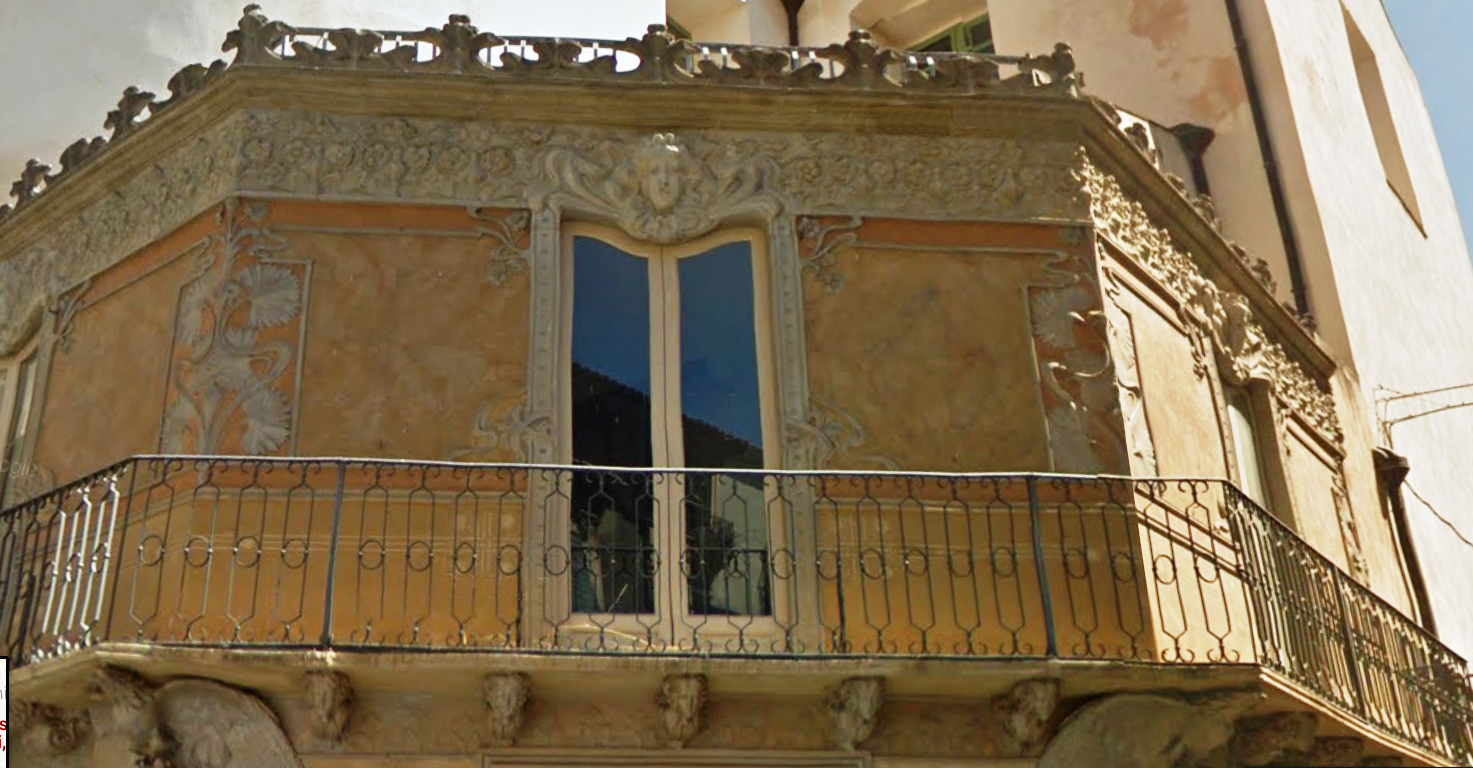
Negozio Frigeri

- Ursino Castle, built by emperor Frederick II in the 13th century.
- Elephants' Palace ("Palace of the Elephants"), designed by Vaccarini, houses the municipality offices.
- University Central Palace, designed by the Battaglia family, is an offices seat and main library of the Catania University.
- Biscari Palace
- Tezzano Palace
- The Medieval Gothic-Catalan Arch of the Friars' Saint John the Baptist (San Giovanni de' Fleres)
- Porta Garibaldi, triumphal arch, originally Porta Ferdinandea erected in 1768 to celebrate the wedding of King Ferdinand I and Marie Caroline of Austria.
- Porta del Fortino ("Redoubt Gate")
- Bellini Theatre
- Sangiorgi Theatre
- Palazzo Rosa ("Pink Palace")
- Negozio Frigeri, or Palazzina Frigeri ("Frigeri Shop", or "Frigeri Little Palace")
- Palazzo dell'Esposizione
- The House of the War Mutilateds (Casa del Mutilato) built in Fascist-style architecture.
- Catania War Cemetery, a Commonwealth Graveyard located in the southern country hamlet of Bicocca.
- Palazzo delle Poste ("Post Office Palace")
- Palazzo della Borsa ("Stock Exchange Building")
- Bellini Garden, or Villa Bellini
- Catania Botanical Garden
- Pacini Garden, or Villa Pacini
- Gioeni Park
- Clementi Building
- Garage Musumeci
- Four sculpture reliefs' street lights, situated in the Piazza Universitaria ("University Square"), depicting legendary characters and events: Peix Nicolau; Amphinomus and Anapias; Gammazita; and the young knight Uzeta.

== Culture ==
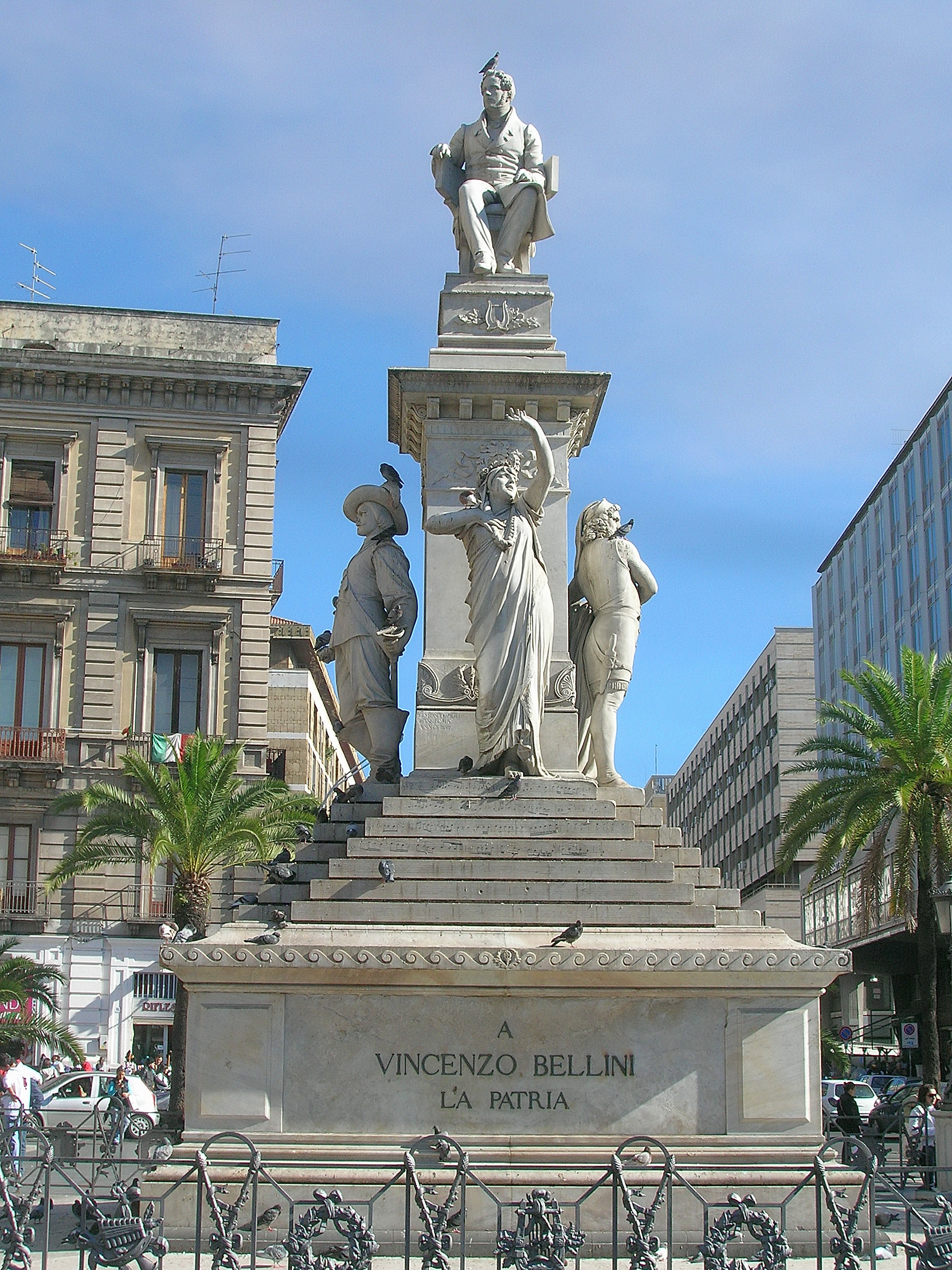
Stesicoro Square and Bellini's Monument (Piazza Stesicoro – Monumento a Vincenzo Bellini)

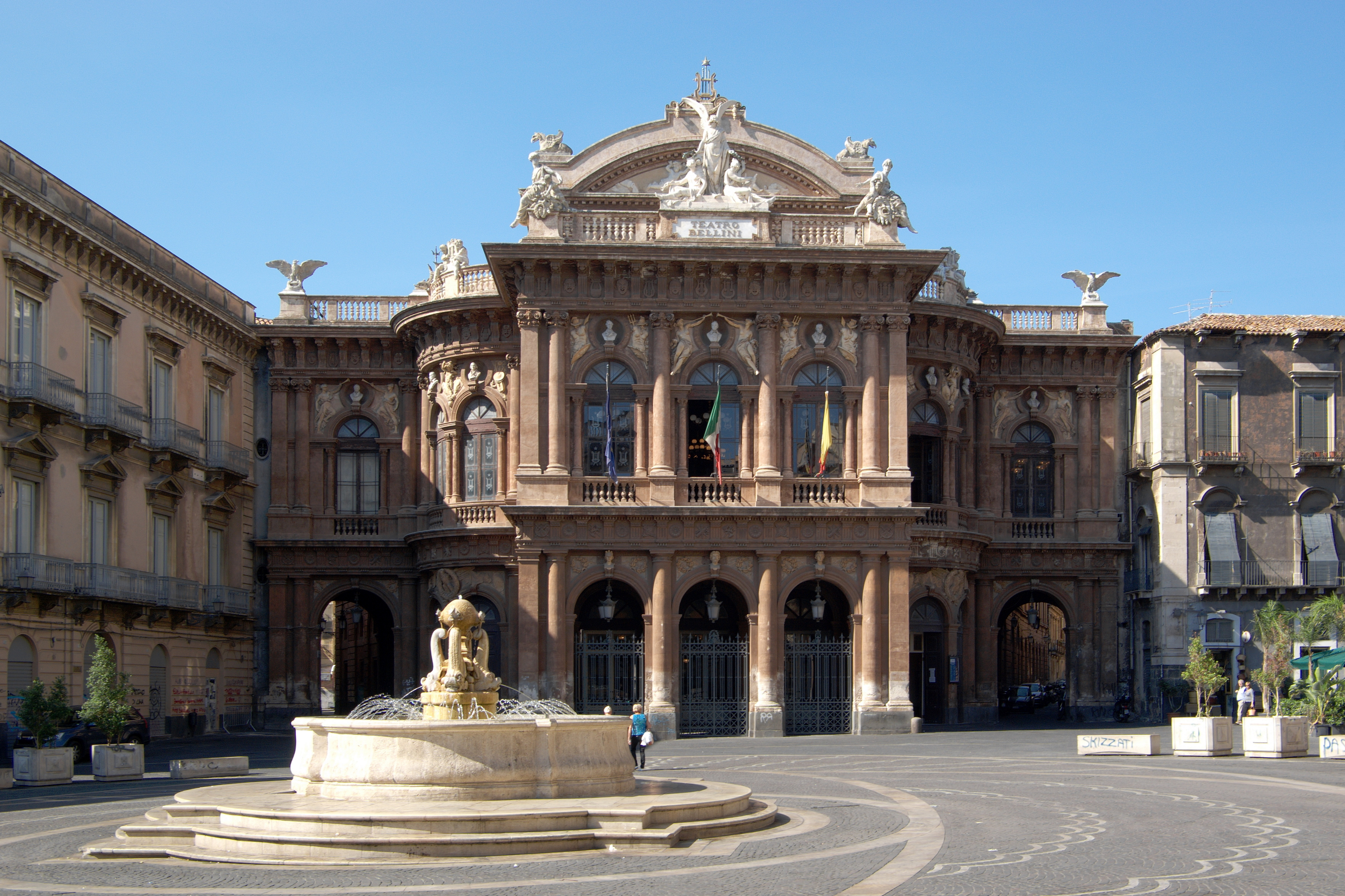
Teatro Massimo Bellini

Opera composer Vincenzo Bellini was born in Palazzo Gravina-Cruyllas in the city center, the palace now houses a museum about him. The Teatro Massimo Vincenzo Bellini, which opened in 1890, presents a variety of works through a season, which run from December to May, including the works of its namesake.

Giovanni Verga was born in Catania in 1840. He became the greatest writer of Verismo, an Italian literary movement akin to Naturalism. His novels portray life among the lower levels of Sicilian society, such as fishermen and stonemasons, and were written in a mixture of both literary language and the local dialect. Francesco Longo Mancini was a painter known for his paintings of nudes, who was born in Catania in 1880.

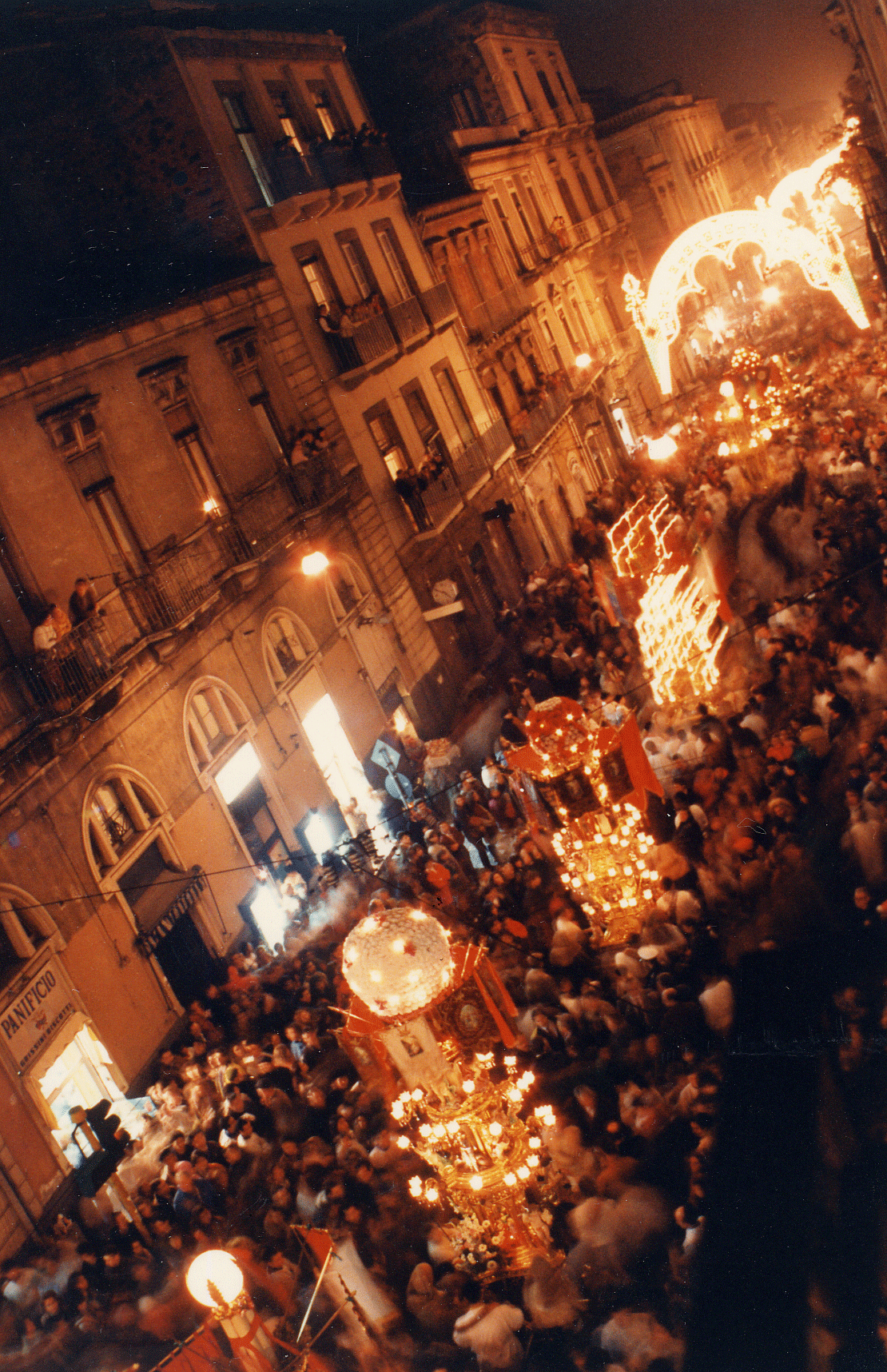
Saint Agatha Festival in February 1994

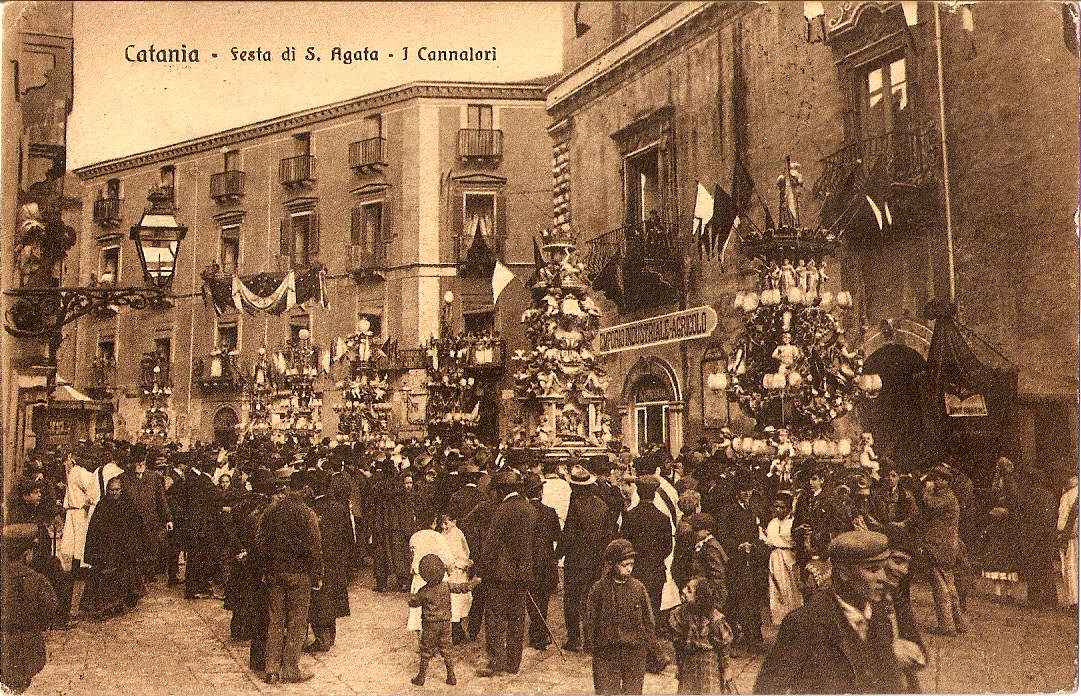
Festival of Saint Agatha in 1915

The city's patron saint is Saint Agatha, who is celebrated with religious pageantry, the Festival of Saint Agatha, on 5 February every year.

The city is the base of the newspaper La Sicilia and of the TV channel Antenna Sicilia, also known as the Sicilia Channel. Several other local television channels and free-press magazines have their headquarters in Catania.

Catania hosts Etna Comics, a successful comic book convention now in its 12th edition, and the Catania Tango Festival, an international Tango event. Its 22nd edition has welcomed tango dancers from 27 different countries, confirming the festival as one of the most important international events in its genre.

The city is home to the Catania Jazz Festival, which typically runs for several winter months with concerts in different locations. In the late 1980s and during the 1990s Catania had a popular music scene. Indie pop and indie rock bands, local radio stations, and dynamic independent music record labels sprung up as a result. In those years, the city experienced a vital cultural period. Artists like Carmen Consoli and Mario Venuti, and internationally known indie rock bands like Uzeda came out of this cultural milieu.

=== Cuisine ===
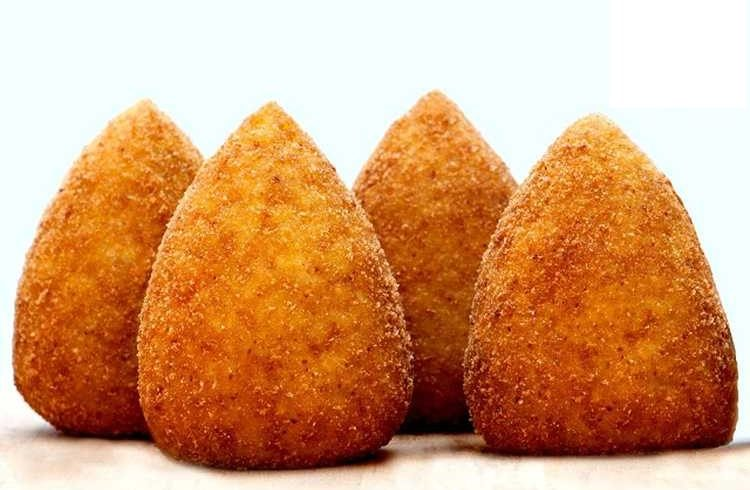
Arancini

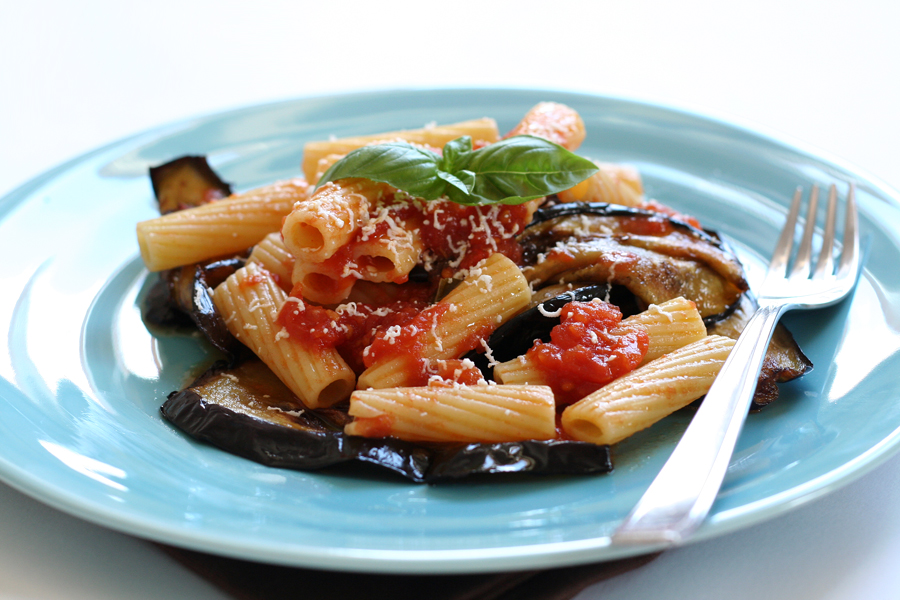
Pasta alla Norma

Food is an important part of Catania's culture and way of life. Local cuisine emphasizes several traits of Sicilian cuisine, whilst developing some of its own character.

Street food is one of the best ways to experience traditional dishes. Arancini are perhaps the city's most iconic: they are stuffed rice balls coated in breadcrumbs and deep fried; in Catania, they are shaped like a cone to invoke Mount Etna. Typical specialties from the city include cipollina (puff pastry with onion, tomato, and prosciutto filling), bolognese (a small pizza topped with tomato, mozzarella, prosciutto, and boiled egg, and covered in puff pastry), crispelle (deep fried dough balls with ricotta or anchovies filling).

During street fairs and religious festivals, street stalls sell calia e simenza (toasted chickpeas and pumpkin seeds). Typical from old street markets are sangeli (cooked pork blood), quarumi (pork tripe), zuzzu (pork jelly), mauru (edible seaweed), and raw seafood. Horse meat is traditional and is sold in shops called arrusti e mancia ("roast it and eat it"), which roast the meat in streetside barbecues.

Apart from street food, typical dishes from Catania are: pasta alla Norma (pasta with fried aubergine, tomato sauce and ricotta salata cheese), named after the namesake opera by Vincenzo Bellini; pasta cco niuru (pasta in cuttlefish ink), maccu (fava beans purée), bastaddi affucati or brocculi affucati (stewed cauliflower or broccoli), caponata (sautéed vegetables) and scacciata (a pie filled with tuma cheese) which is traditional during Christmastime.

Catania is also famous for its pasticceria (pastries and cakes). Pastries vary according to season and to seasonal events: during the Festival of Saint Agatha, patron saint of the city, there are the cassatelle (small cassatas) and olivette (olive shaped almond paste). In Easter, there are aceddi ccu l'ovu (boiled eggs covered in biscuit). In summer there is granita. During the Festa dei morti (traditional celebrations in All Souls' Day) there are biscuits called ossa di mortu, rame di Napoli and nsuddi.

Drink kiosks are everywhere in town and serve soft drinks. Traditional soft drinks are made by mixing fruit syrups with soda and other flavors such as anisette.

Local products include blood oranges, pistachios from Bronte, extra-virgin olive oil, cactus fruit, cherries, grapes from Mazzarrone, strawberries from Maletto, mushrooms, honey and wine.

== Economy ==
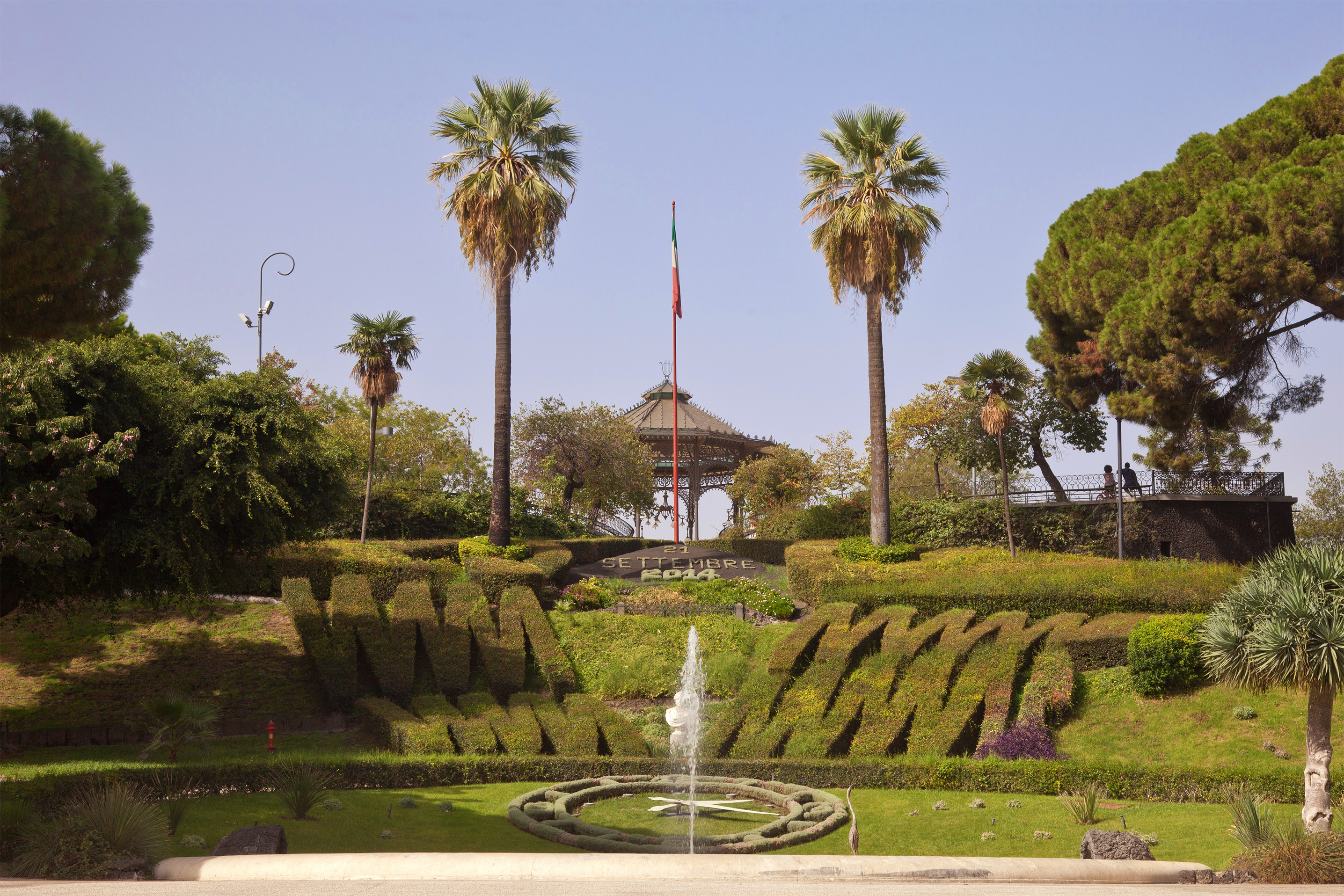
Villa Bellini, one of the most visited places

Catania is the first economic and industrial hub of Sicily. The city is famous for its mainly petrochemical industry, and the extraction of sulphur. In the year 2000, according to Census, Catania was the 14th richest city in Italy, with a GDP of US$6.6 billion (€6.304 billion), which was 0.54% of the Italian GDP, a GDP per capita of US$21,000 (€20,100) and an average GDP per employee of US$69,000 (€66,100).

In the late-19th century and early-20th century, Catania began to be heavily industrialised, with its several factories and chimneys, often being referred to as Southern Italy's "Manchester". The economy of Catania suffered heavily from the bad effects of World War I, and was marked by an economic crisis and recession that culminated in the 1920s. Since then, the city lost its industrial and entrepreneurial importance. In the 1930s, Catania remained a small fishing town with derelict and disused industries. However, after the destruction of World War II, Catania's economy began to re-grow in the late-1950s and early-1960s. The city's economic growth was so rapid and dynamic that it was often nicknamed the "Milan of the South", or in Italian "Milano del Sud". This rapid economic growth prompted a great number of Sicilians living in the more rural areas, or smaller towns such as Enna, Ragusa and Caltanissetta, to move to the city to seek new jobs.

Today, Catania, despite several problems, has one of the most dynamic economies in the whole of Southern Italy. It still has a strong industrial and agricultural sector, and a fast-growing tourist industry, with many international visitors coming to visit the city's main sights and the nearby Etna volcano. It contains the headquarters or important offices of companies such as STMicroelectronics, and also several chemical and pharmaceutical businesses. There have been several new business developments to further boost Catania's economy, including the construction of Etnapolis, a big shopping mall designed by Massimiliano Fuksas, the same architect who designed the FieraMilano industrial fair in Milan, or the Etna Valley, where several high-tech offices are located.

Tourism is a fast-growing industry in Catania. Lately, the administration and private companies have made several investments in the hospitality industry in order to make tourism a competitive sector in the Metropolitan City. Etnaland, a large amusement and water park located in Belpasso, is in the metropolitan area of Catania, 12 kilometres (7.5 mi) from the city center. It is the largest of its kind in Southern Italy and attracts thousands of tourists, not only from Sicily, but also from the rest of Italy. According to Tripadvisor (2018) it is the third-largest water park in Europe.

The seaport of Catania is linked to the road-rail distribution hub of Bologna. In September 2020 Mercitalia Logistics opened the first full railway route to link the city to Northern Italy. It replaced an older mixed maritime-railway line.

== Transport ==
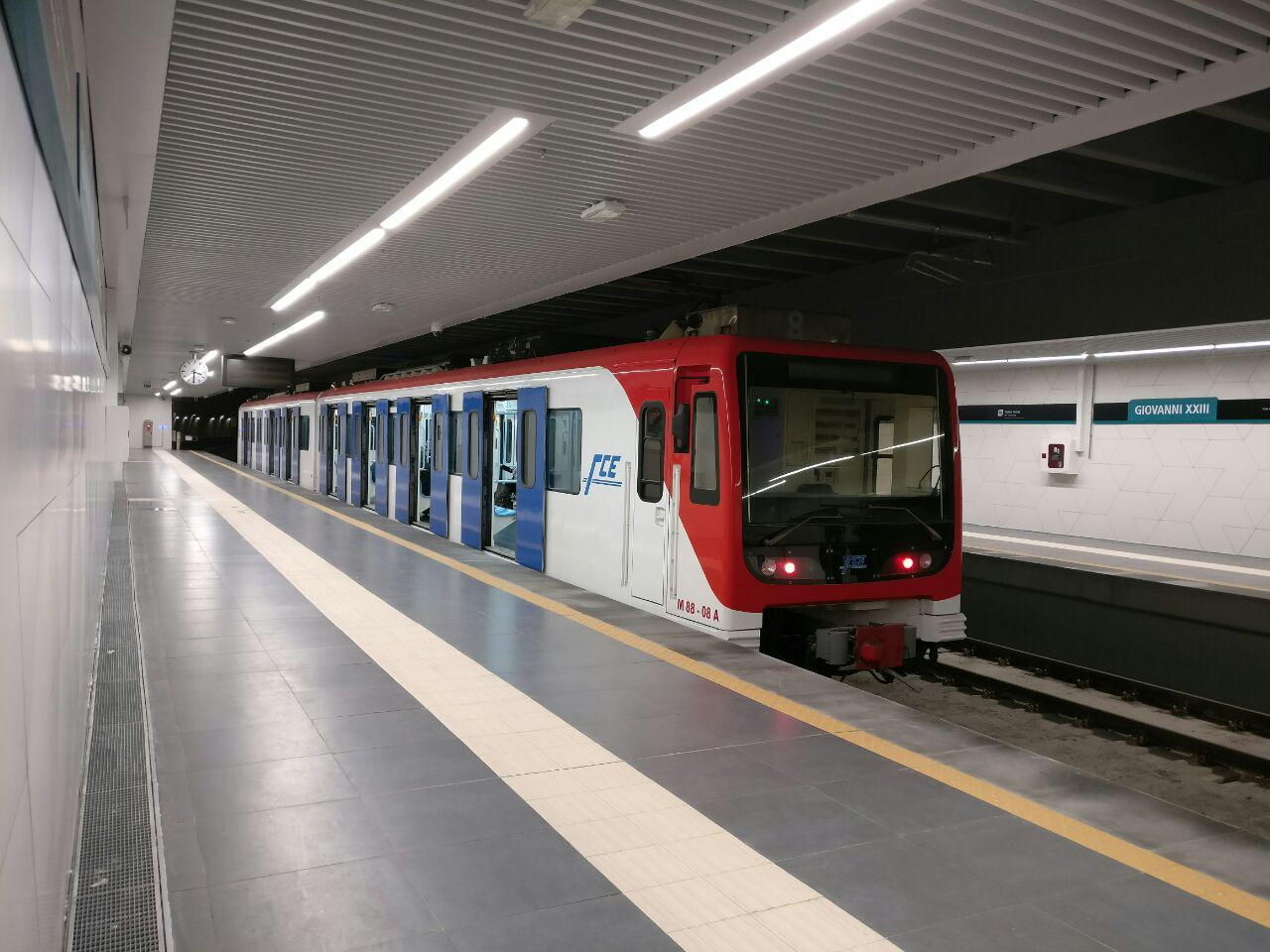
Catania Metro

Catania has a commercial seaport (Catania seaport), an international airport (Catania Fontanarossa), several railway stations (Catania Centrale is the main one) and it is the main node of the Sicilian motorway system.

The motorways serving Catania are the A18 Messina-Catania and the A19 Palermo-Catania; and the prosecution of the A18 going from Catania to Syracuse and to Gela.

The Circumetnea is a narrow-gauge railway that runs for 110 km (68 mi) from Catania around the base of Mount Etna. It attains an elevation of 976 m (3,202 ft) above sea level before descending to rejoin the coast at Giarre-Riposto to the north.

In the late 1990s, the first line of an underground railway (Metropolitana di Catania) was built. The underground service started in 1999 and it is currently active on a route of 8.8 km (5.5 mi), from the station Nesima (west of town), passing through the stations of San Nullo, Cibali, Milo, Borgo, Giuffrida, Italia, Galatea, Giovanni XXIII, to Stesicoro. The last two stations, bringing Catania's underground into the city centre, opened on 20 December 2016. The line is planned to be extended from the satellite city of Paternò to Fontanarossa Airport.

=== Catania public transport statistics ===
The average amount of time people spend commuting on public transit in Catania on a weekday is 56 min. 13% of public transit riders ride for more than 2 hours every day. The average amount of time people wait at a stop or station for public transit is 23 min, while 46% of riders wait for over 20 minutes on average every day. The average distance people usually ride in a single trip with public transit is 4.7 km (2.9 mi), while 3% travel for over 12 km (7.5 mi) in a single direction.

== Education ==
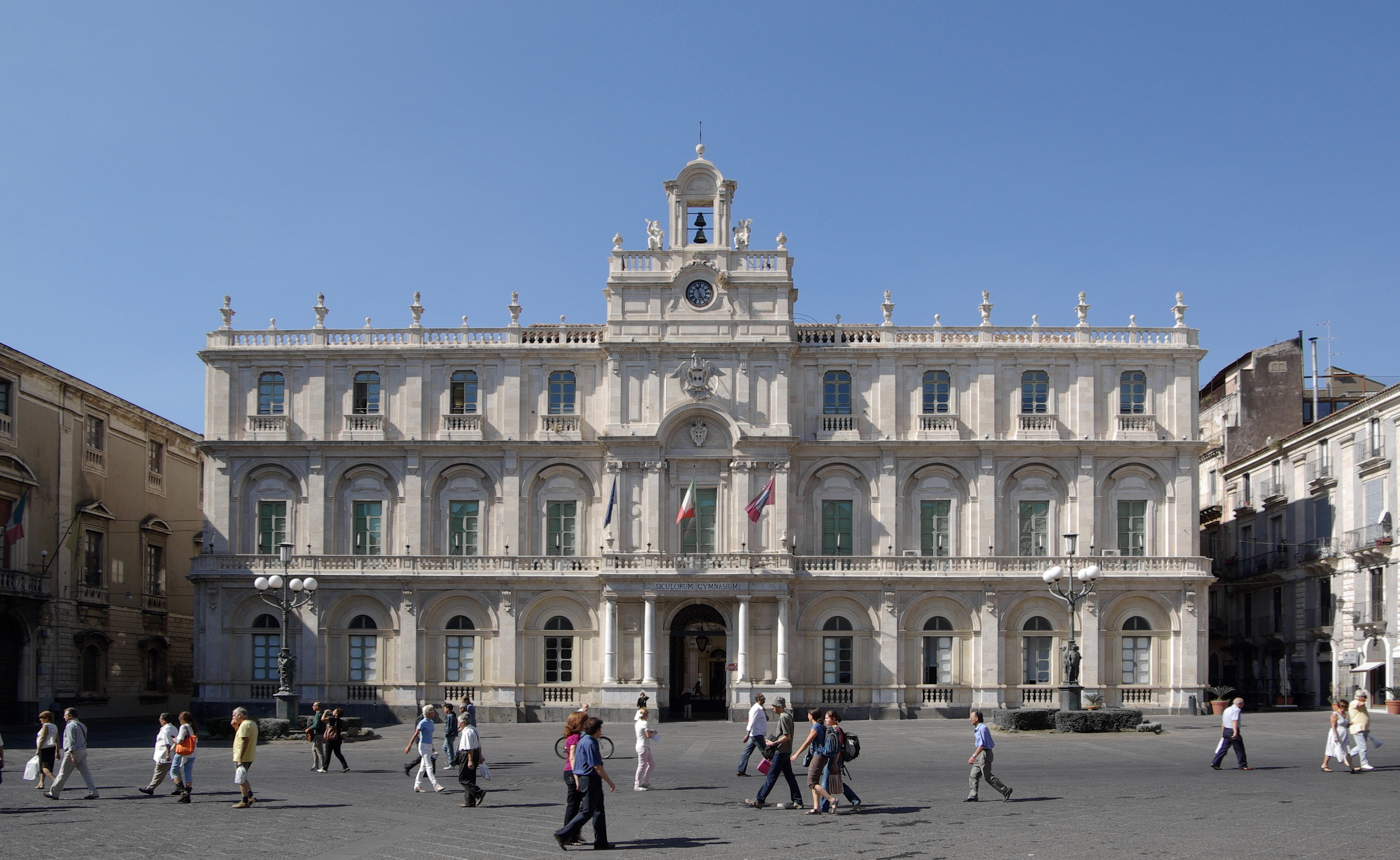
Palazzo Centrale dell'Universita, in city centre, houses the rector's office.

Established in 1434, the University of Catania is the oldest university in Sicily. Its academic nicknames are: Siculorum Gymnasium and Siciliae Studium Generale. It hosts 12 faculties and over 62,000 students; and offers undergraduate and postgraduate programs.

Catania hosts the Scuola superiore di Catania, linked to the University of Catania, aimed at excellence in education; they offer undergraduate and postgraduate programs for teachers.

Catania is home to the prestigious Istituto Musicale Vincenzo Bellini an advanced institute of musical studies (Conservatory) and the Accademia di Belle Arti an advanced institute of artistic studies. Both institutions offer programs of university level for musical and artistic education.

== Sport ==
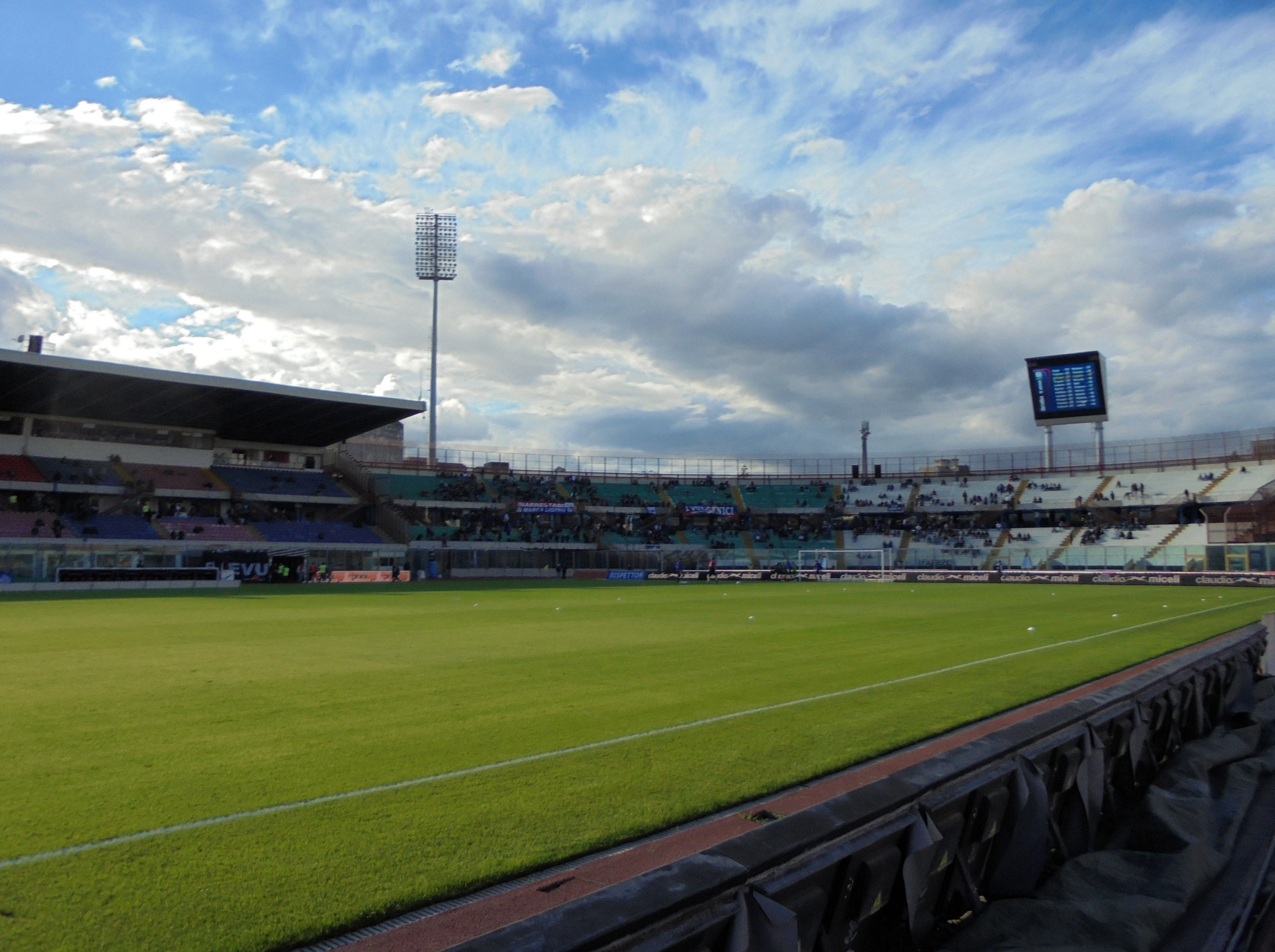
Angelo Massimino Football Stadium

Catania is home to many sports clubs covering a wide range of disciplines. The most famous club is the Catania FC football team, followed by approximately half a million supporters. Another club standing out from the rest is AS Orizzonte Catania, which is the leading women's water polo club in Italy, with 26 National Championship titles (15 in a row from 1992 to 2006), and also in Europe, with 8 European Champions Cup titles.

Catania is the most successful city in team sports in the entire south of Italy (including Sicily and Sardinia), leading (as of July 2026) with 81 National Championships titles, ahead of Naples and of Bari.

As for individual sports, 56 athletes from Catania have won world titles, 54 have won European titles and 139 have won national titles.

In the Olympic Games, over the years, Italian athletes from Catania have won a total of 7 gold medals, 8 silver medals, and 4 bronze medals.

National Championships Titles Teams (as of July 2026)

Number of Titles	Club	Sport	Gender	Years	Notes
26	Orizzonte Catania	Water Polo	Female	1992 to 2006, 2008 to 2011, 2019, 2021 to 2026	15 years in a row (highest record in all Sports and both genders)
10	Polisportiva Canottieri Catania	Canoe Polo	Female	2011, 2013 to 2022	9 years in a row (in 2020 the title was not assigned due to the coronavirus pandemic and the related sanitary restrictions)
6	CUS Catania	Field Hockey Indoor	Female	1980, 1985, 1988, 1991, 1993, 1997	
6	CUS Catania	Field Hockey	Female	1990 to 1994, 1996	5 years in a row
5	New Squash Club Catania	Squash	n/a	2016, 2020, 2021, 2022, 2024	
4	Pink Elephants Catania	American Football	Female	2014, 2017, 2018, 2021	
3	Catania Beach Soccer	Beach Soccer	Male	2008, 2018, 2024	
3	Polisportiva Canottieri Catania	Canoe Polo 3X3	Female	2016 to 2018	
2	Polisportiva I Cirnerchi Catania	Cricket	Female	2001, 2002	
2	Islanders Catania	Softball	Male	2018, 2019	
2	Polisportiva Canottieri Catania	Canoe Polo	Male	2018, 2023	
2	Meta Catania	5-a-side Football	Male	2024, 2025	
1	Jolly Componibili Catania	Football	Female	1978	
1	Paoletti Catania	Volleyball	Male	1978	
1	Alidea Catania	Volleyball	Female	1980	
1	CUS Catania	Canoe Polo	Female	1999	
1	Romolo Murri Catania	Cricket Indoor	Male	2002	
1	Pol. Nautica Katana / CK Academy	Canoe Polo	Female	2007	
1	Circolo Canoa Catania	Canoe Polo	Female	2009	
1	HCU Catania	Field Hockey	Female	2014	
1	Red Sox Paternò	Baseball	Male	2016	
1	Canottieri Jonica Catania	Canoe Polo	Female	2025	
Total: 81

Champion Cups Titles Teams (as of August 2025)

Number of Titles	Club	Sport	Gender	Years
8	Orizzonte Catania	Water polo	Female	1994, 1998, 2001, 2002, 2004 to 2006, 2008
2	Polisportiva Canottieri Catania	Canoe polo	Female	2019, 2022
1	Catania Beach Soccer	Beach Soccer	Male	2025
Total: 11

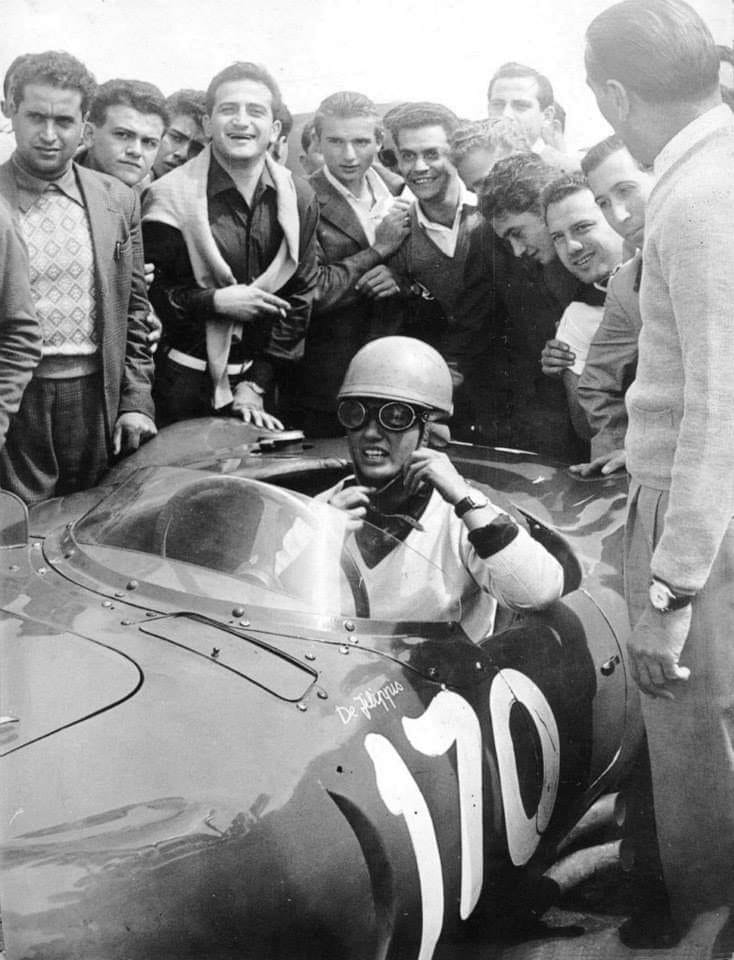
Maria Teresa de Filippis winning the Catania-Etna in 1955

Main Sports Facilities

Name	Capacity	Type	Year	Tenants	Notes
Stadio Angelo Massimino	21000	Football Stadium	1937	Calcio Catania	
PalaNesima	6500	Sports Arena	2003	n/a	Restoration works planned
Piscina Comunale di Nesima	1000	Swimming Pool	1996	Orizzonte Catania	
PalaCatania	4500	Sports Arena	1997	ASD Meta	
PalaNitta	600	Sports Arena	1997		
PalaGalermo	500	Sports Arena	1997	ASD Blue Angels	

Catania holds the Catania-Etna car competition, organized by the Automobile Club d'Italia. The competition dates back to 1923 and has been taking place on a regular basis (with some gaps) from 1947. Suspended in 2010 due to a serious accident, the 46th edition is planned for the end of June 2021.

From 1960 to 2011 Catania held the International event named Trofeo Sant'Agata, a road running competition which took place in the streets of the city center, every year on 3 February (the day the Festival of Saint Agatha begins).

The city also hosted a series of International Sports Events:

- 1993 Rugby World Cup Sevens qualifying, and the associated Etna Cup, which was won by the host Sicily team.
- 1994 UCI Road World Championships (together with Palermo and Agrigento).
- 1997 Summer Universiade (together with Palermo and Messina).
- 2003 Military World Games
- 2011 Men's EuroHockey Championship III.
- 2011 World Fencing Championships (Italy came out of this competition as the top winning nation with 11 medals, one won by the local fencer Paolo Pizzo).
- 2024 World Company Sports Games.

== Notable residents ==
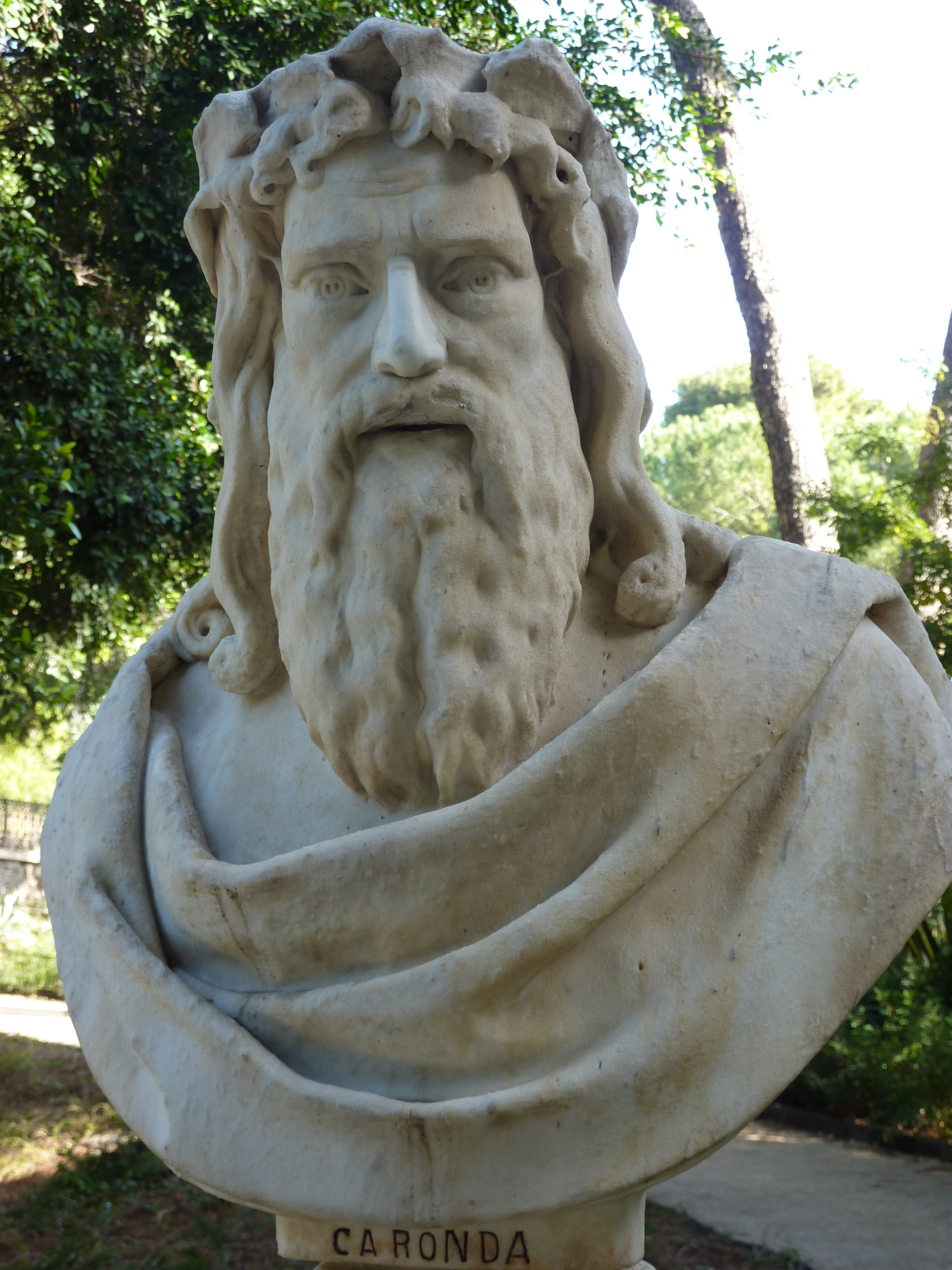
Charondas

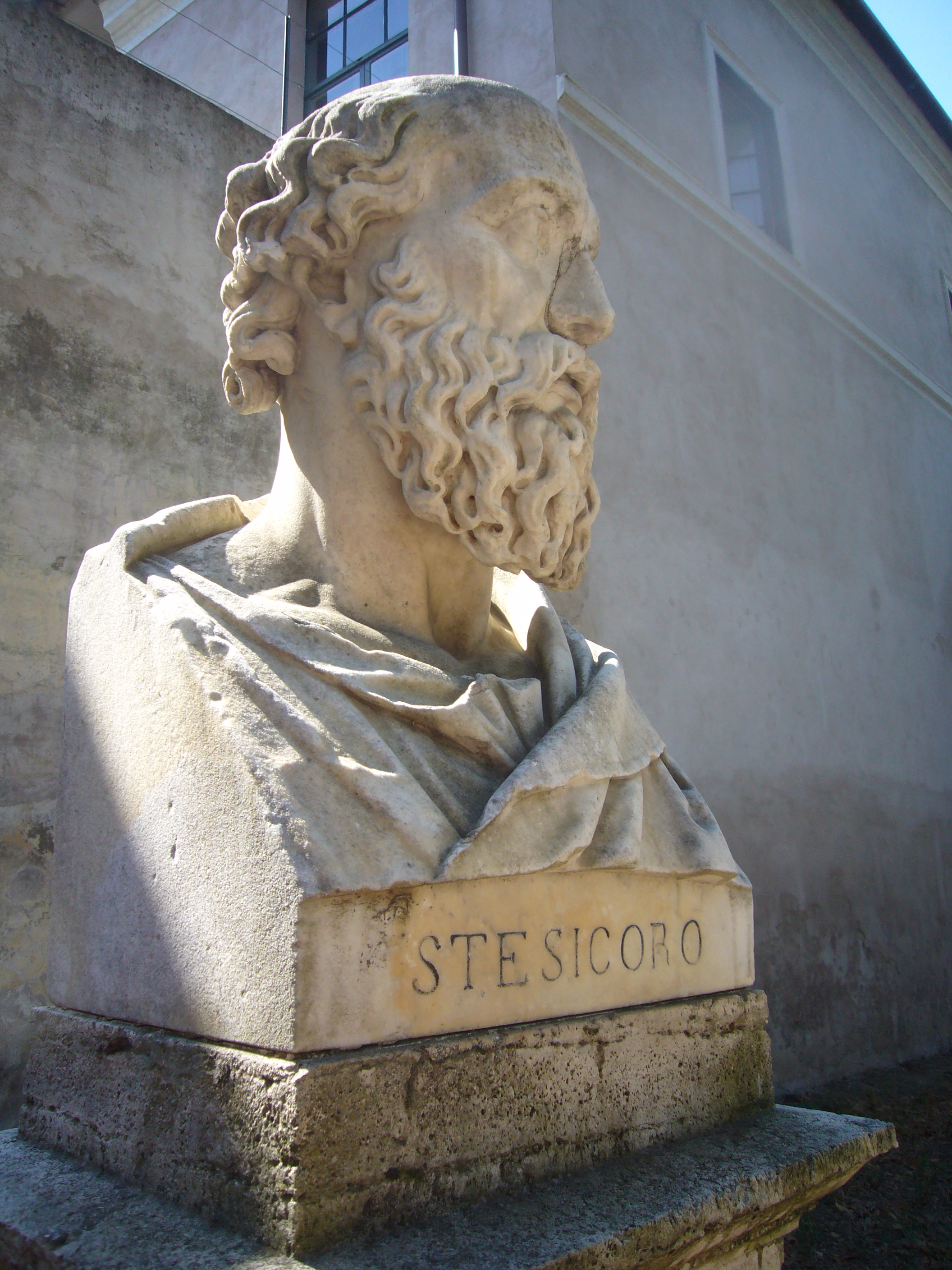
Stesichorus

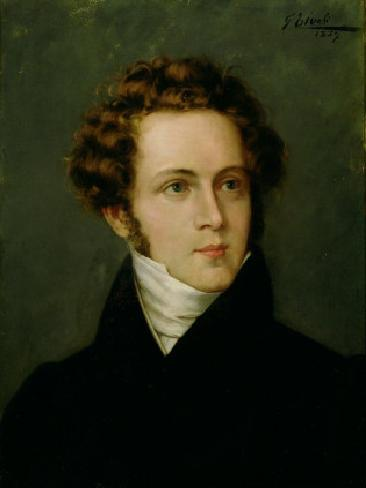
Vincenzo Bellini

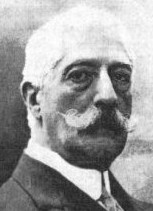
Giovanni Verga

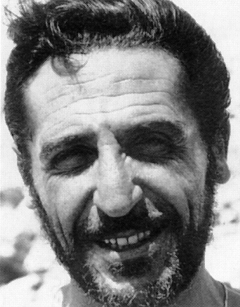
Giuseppe Fava

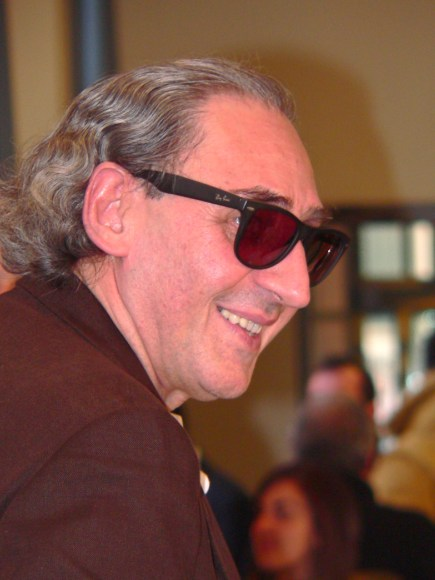
Franco Battiato

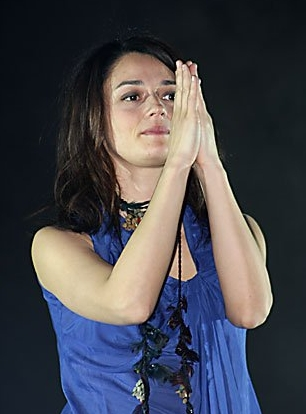
Carmen Consoli

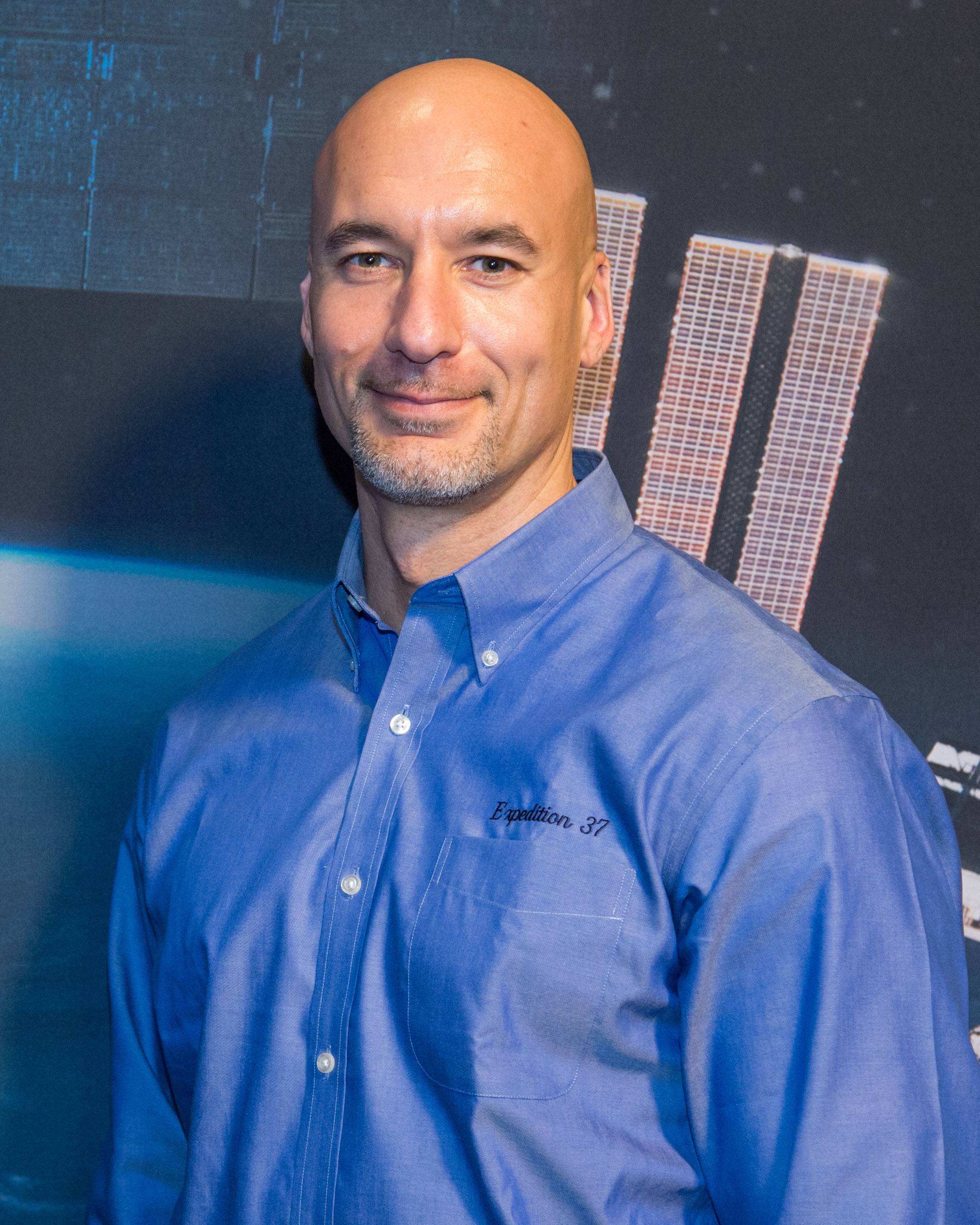
Luca Parmitano

- Aaron ben Gershon abu al-Rabi, 15th century rabbi
- Oriana Bandiera (born 1971), economist and academic
- Pippo Baudo (1936–2025), TV presenter
- Franco Battiato (1945–2021), singer-songwriter, composer and filmmaker
- Gianni Bella (born 1947), singer-songwriter
- Marcella Bella (born 1952), singer
- Vincenzo Bellini (1801–1835), composer
- Ornella Bertorotta (born 1967), politician
- Alfredo Bonanno (born 1937), anarchist
- Vitaliano Brancati (1907–1954), writer
- Giuseppa Bolognara Calcagno (1826–1884), freedom fighter of the Risorgimento
- Luigi Capuana (1839–1915), writer
- Charondas (6th c. BC), jurist
- Carmen Consoli (born 1974), singer-songwriter
- Angelo d'Arrigo (1961–2006), aviator
- Federico De Roberto (1861–1927), writer
- Tea Falco (born 1986), actress
- Giuseppe Fava (1925–1984), journalist, writer and playwright
- Gotamī, (1999-), Buddhist nun and writer
- Turi Ferro (1921–2001), actor
- Rosario Fiorello (1960), comedian, singer, radio and TV presenter
- Rossella Fiamingo (1991), fencer
- Libero Grassi (1924–1991), businessman
- Leo Gullotta (born 1946), actor
- Andrea Lo Cicero (born 1976), rugby footballer
- Miriam Leone (born 1985), Miss Italia 2008
- Ettore Majorana (1905–?), physicist
- Nino Martoglio (1870–1921), writer
- Massimo Maugeri (born 1968), writer and journalist
- Angelo Musco (1872–1937), actor
- Tuccio Musumeci (born 1934), actor
- Giovanni Pacini (1796–1867), composer
- Luca Parmitano (born 1976), astronaut
- Ercole Patti (1903–1976), writer and journalist
- Goliarda Sapienza (1924–1996), writer
- Giuseppe Sciuti (1834–1911), painter
- Piermaria Siciliano (born 1974), swimmer
- Stefania Spampinato (born 1982), actress
- Stesichorus (c. 630 – 555 BC), poet
- Giovanni Verga (1840–1922), writer
- Manlio Vinciguerra (born 1976), scientist

== International relations ==
=== Consulates ===
The following countries have a consulate in Catania: Azerbaijan, Bangladesh, Belgium, Finland, France, United Kingdom, Greece, Malta, the Netherlands, Romania, Senegal, Spain, Sri Lanka, South Africa, Switzerland, and Ukraine.

=== Twin towns – sister cities ===
Catania is twinned with:

- Grenoble, France, since 1961
- Phoenix, United States, since 2001
- Ottawa, Canada, since 2002
- Oświęcim County, Poland, since 2010
- (United Kingdom) Oxford, England, UK, since 2012
- Borgo Maggiore, San Marino, since 2015
- Kaliningrad, Russia, since 2017
- Alexandria, Egypt, since 2019

=== Influence on the planning of Adelaide, Australia ===
The site of what was to become the major Australian city of Adelaide was surveyed and laid out by Colonel William Light, the first Surveyor-General of South Australia. In 1823, Light had fondly written of Catania: "The two principal streets cross each other at right angles in the square in the direction of north and south and east and west. They are wide and spacious and about a mile [1.6 km] long". This became the basis for his plan of Adelaide.

== Sources ==
- Amico, Vito Maria (1740). Catana Illustrata.
- Correnti, Santi (1981). La Città Semprerifiorente. Catania: Greco.
- Correnti, Santi (2001). Cataniamia. Catania: Greco.
- Correnti, Santi; Santino Spartà (2007). Le strade di Catania. Rome: Newton & Compton.
- Various. Enciclopedia di Catania. Tringale.
- Ilaria Di Pietra, Catania. Viaggi e viaggiatori nella città del vulcano, Giuseppe Maimone Editore, Catania 2007
- Antonino Recupero, Catania. Città del mediterraneo, (Fotografia di Alfio Garozzo. Prefazione di Andrea Camilleri), Giuseppe Maimone Editore, Catania 2007, ISBN 978-88-7751-273-4
