= Francesco Mancini-Ardizzone =

Italian painter

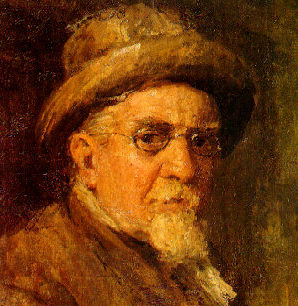
Self-portrait

Francesco Mancini-Ardizzone (Acireale, Sicily, 26 October 1863 – 1948) was an Italian painter. He painted diverse subject matter, including portraits, genre, and sacred subjects, as well as landscapes and seascapes of the Southern Italian and Sicilian coasts.

== Biography ==
He initially studied in Acireale under Antonino Bonaccorsi, but garnering a stipend from the municipality, he enrolled in the Academy of Fine Arts of Naples, where, influenced by the school of Domenico Morelli, he became attached to the Realism style. From 1885 to 1886, he traveled to Rome, where he exhibited landscapes at the Mostre degli Amatori e Cultori (1886, In dicembre and Marina).

He returned to Acireale, where he was highly prolific, including painting in many churches and public buildings, including the cupola of the Acireale Cathedral (1895–1899). The pendentives of the dome have the four evangelist by the 18th century baroque painter Pietro Paolo Vasta, while Mancini painted the scenes in the drum of the dome, depicting four episodes of the Old Testament. The transept has a Burial of Saint Sebastian by the artist. He also painted for the Basilica of the Collegiata di San Sebastiano (Cupola and transepts, including Jesus emerges from the tomb, 1899–1901); in the Church of the Oratory of the Philippines (Holy Family), and the Palazzo Comunale.

In the church of the Minorites in Catania, he painted a canvas on the Souls of Purgatory. He also painted altarpieces in the churches of Riposto, Piedimonte Etneo, and Aci Trezza (St John the Baptist, church of San Giovanni Batista). Many of his paintings, both seascapes and portraits, were donated to the Pinacoteca Zelantea in Acireale. The Zelantea gallery contains a self-portrait.

In 1884 at Turin, he exhibited Pescatori in Sicilia and Finalmente si è addormentato. In 1887 at Venice, he exhibited: Da Vietri ad Amalfi; Pioggia; Pattuglia; Il castello d'Arci. Other works are: Tempo triste; Madre amorosa; and Il ritorno dei pescatori.
