= San Domenico, Catania =

Church building in Catania, Italy

Coordinates: 37.50802°N 15.08308°E

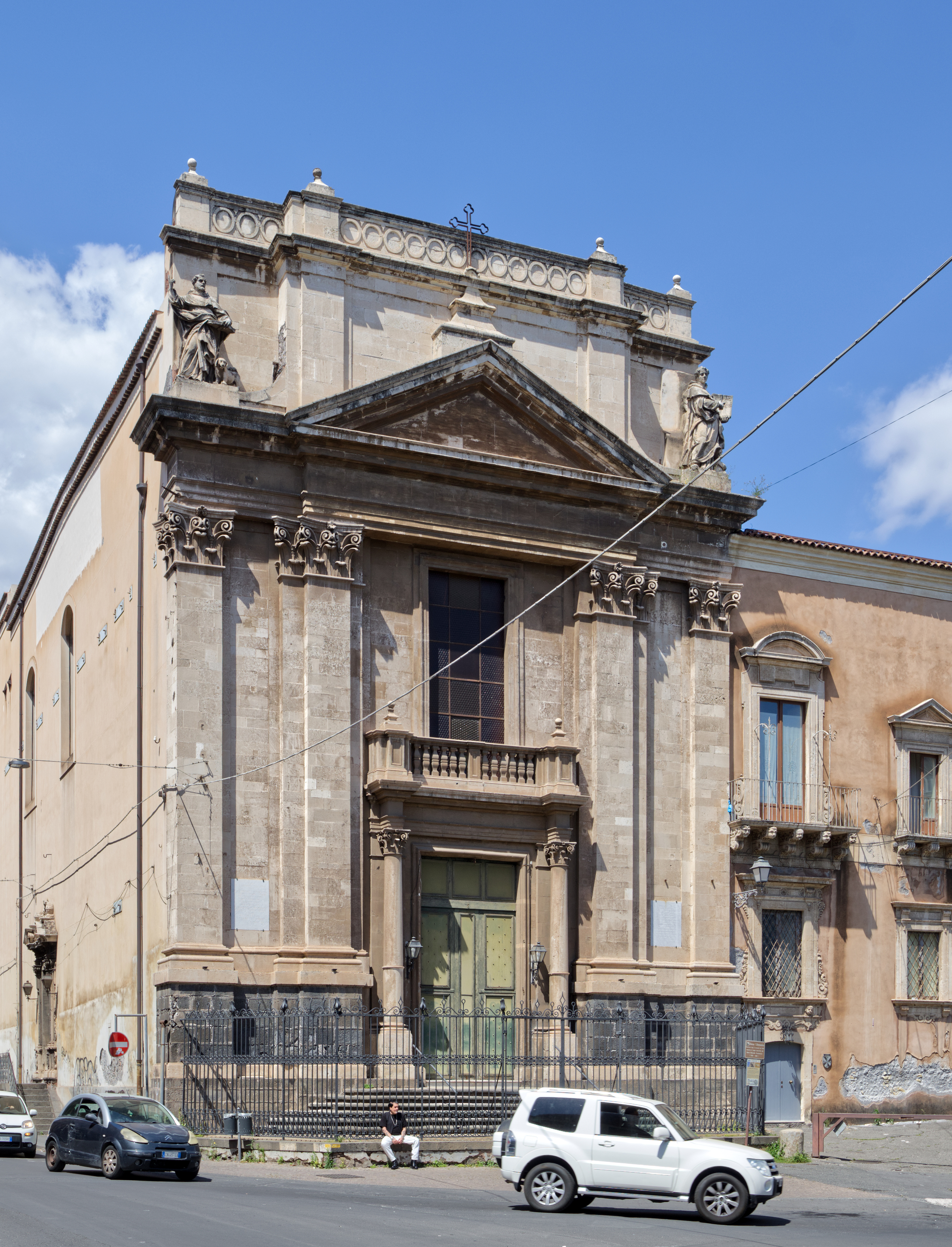
Facade of San Domenico

San Domenico, also called Santa Maria la Grande is a Roman Catholic church and active convent located on piazza San Domenico in the quartiere di Santa Maria la Grande, in Catania, region of Sicily, Italy. The church stands about two blocks north of the church of Sant'Agata la Vetere on via Santa Maddalena. The neoclassical-style, late 17th-century church houses a few prominent altarpieces that survived the 1693 catastrophe in Catania.

== History and description ==
The Dominican order had arrived to Catania by the 13th century. By 1313 they had a church and convent near the site of the Castello Ursino. Wishing to clear the space adjacent to the castle, by 1405, King Martin I of Sicily, had the monastery razed, and the priests were granted a palace seized from Blasco de Alagona, and the adjacent church at this site called Santa Maria la Grande, dedicated to the Marian veneration of Santa Maria ad Nives centered around Santa Maria Maggiore in Rome.

A convent was completed by 1640. This church and convent were severely damaged by the 1693 earthquake, and reconstruction began in the next century with the patronage of Vincenzo Paterno Castello. In 1866, the order was suppressed and the former convent, found to the right of the church facade, was used by the military. After having the buildings restored to the Dominicans, in 1904 the monks built in a new convent wing behind the church. In the city of Catania, there was a second Dominican convent, this one for women, dedicated to St Catherine of Alexandria.

On the architrave over the portal in a stone statue of the blessed Bernardo Scammacca, by Epifanio Licata.

The architect and timing of the construction of the church is unclear, but appears later than most churches in town. The interior has a central nave and two aisles with mainly bare pilasters. The altarpieces include prominent works. One altarpiece on the Madonna or the Rosary with Dominican Saints by Matteo Ragonisi. Another depicts the Virgin and Child and Saints Dominic and Catherine holding the Rosary and Crown of Thorns by Giacinto Platania. Among the saints depicted are Saint Agnese di Montepulciano, Beato Benedetto XI, Beato Ambrogio Sansedoni, San Giacinto di Polonia, San Ludovico Bertrand, St Peter Martyr, Santa Rosa da Lima, St Thomas Aquinas, San Pio V, Sant'Antonino Pierozzi. In the left nave, one chapel has an altarpiece with the Madonna, St John, and the Magdalen grieving at the Cross by Alessandro Vasta. Another chapel has a depiction of Miracle of St Raimondo de Penafort crossing the Sea, Saint Catherine talks to the Doctors, and St Thomas Aquinas dedicates his work to the Virgin. There is a Pentecost and a Vision of Pope Innocent III regarding the Basilica di San Giovanni in Laterano attributed to Platania.
