= Palazzo della Città, Acireale =

Palace in Sicily, Italy

Coordinates: 37°36′45.01″N 15°09′56.55″E

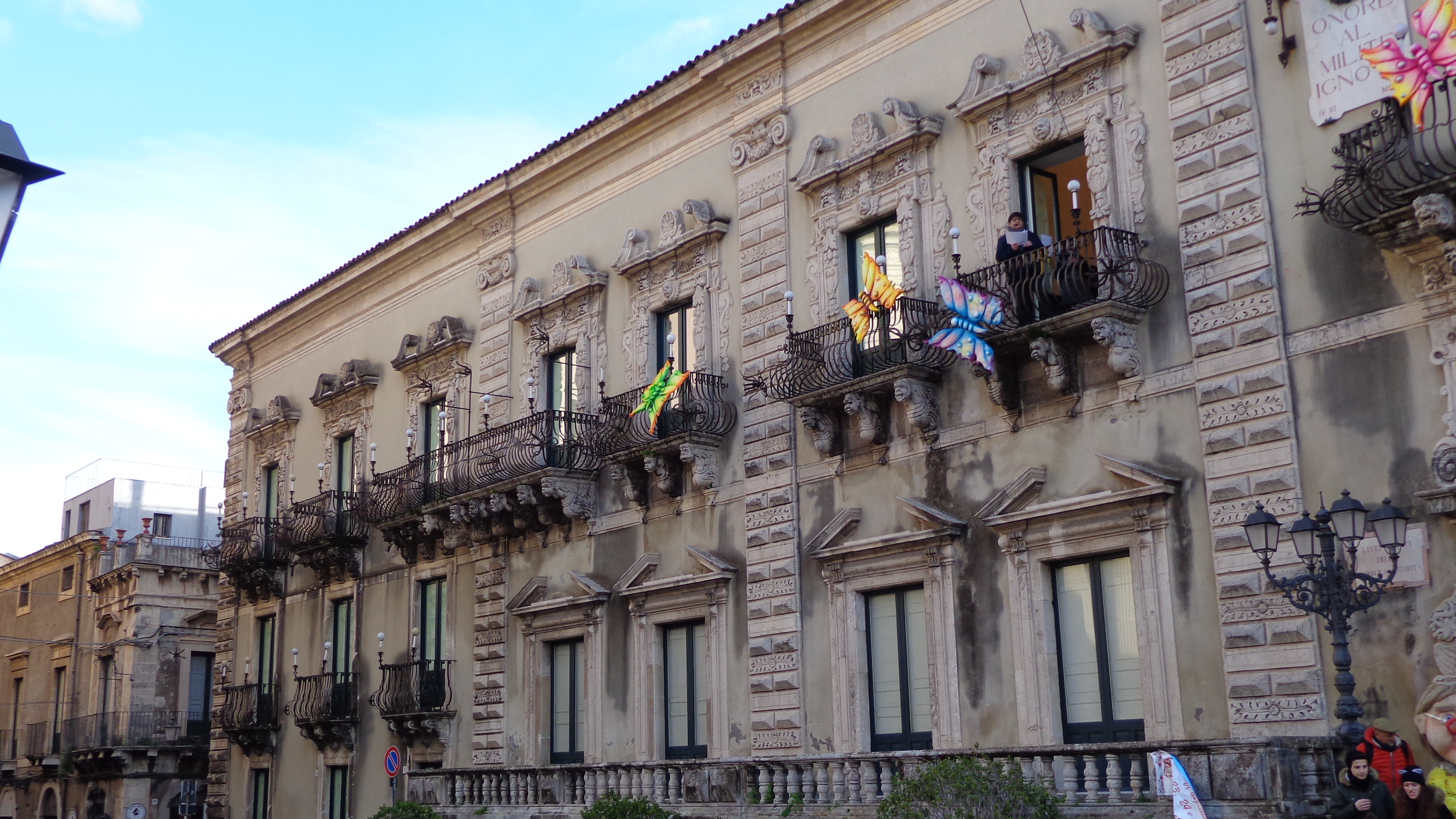

The Palazzo della Città is a late-Baroque-style palace, built as the mayor's offices, is located on piazza Duomo, across from the Acireale Cathedral, in the city of Acireale, region of Sicily, Italy.

Construction of a city hall (Loggia Giuratoria) at the site begun in the late 17th-century only to collapse during the 1693 Sicily earthquake. A new design was made by Costantino Larcidiacono, but construction was delayed by lack of funding, and further damage from earthquakes in 1783 and 1818. It was refurbished and completed only in the late 20th-century. The palace retains the original late-baroque facade and sculptural portal. The facade has rusticated pilasters and the portal is surmounted by an elegant balcony supported by gargoyle like masks. The ceiling of the main council room was frescoed in 1942 by Primo Panciroli with an allegorical depiction of Italy.

In the ground floor, since 1833, are the main offices for the Accademia di Scienze, Lettere e Belle Arti degli Zelanti e dei Dafnici, also called La Zelantea, founded as an erudite society in 1671. The academy promotes cultural events in Acireale: it manages the Biblioteca and Pinacoteca Zelantea; and published the scientifica and literary journal "Memorie e Rendiconti".
