= Santa Maria degli Agonizzanti =

Santa Maria degli Agonizzanti may refer to:

- Santa Maria degli Agonizzanti, Acireale, deconsecrated Baroque, Roman Catholic church in Acireale, Sicily, Italy
- Santa Maria degli Agonizzanti, Palermo, Baroque, Roman Catholic church in Palermo, Sicily, Italy
