= Francesco Patanè =

Italian painter

Francesco Patanè (1 June 1902 – 21 June 1980) was an Italian painter, engraver, and sculptor. He was born in Acireale, and was active in his native Sicily. He painted altarpieces and frescoes for the church of San Sebastiano and the Cathedral of Acireale. He also painted in the nearby towns of Piedimonte Etneo and Aci San Filippo.
