= Collegiate Basilica of San Sebastiano, Acireale =

Roman Catholic church in Sicily, Italy

Coordinates: 37.61152°N 15.16543°E

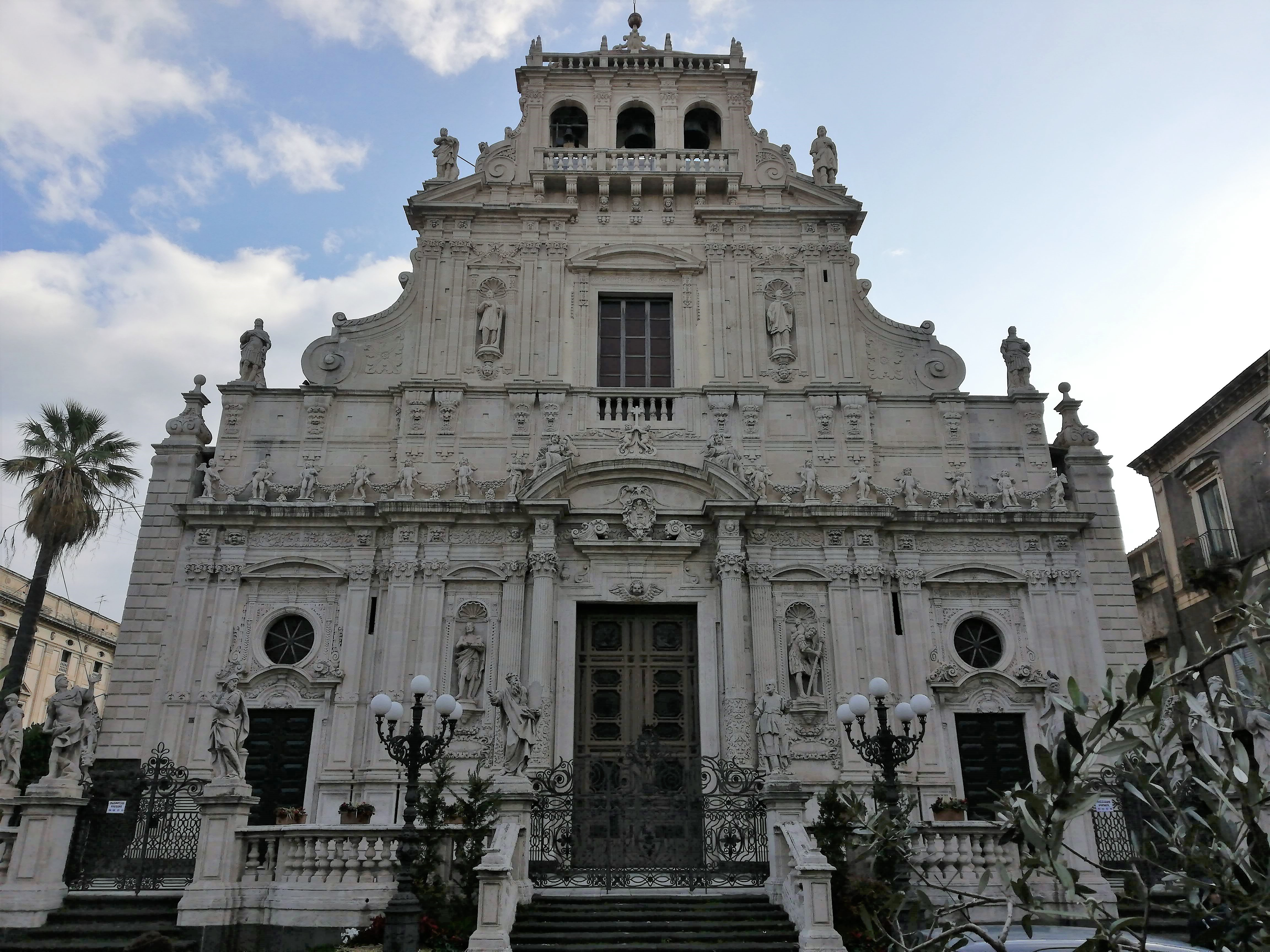
View of the Facade

San Sebastiano is a Baroque-style, Roman Catholic collegiate basilica church located on Piazza Lionardo Vigo in central Acireale in the region of Sicily of Italy. The church became collegiate in 1924; and basilica in 1990.

== History and description ==
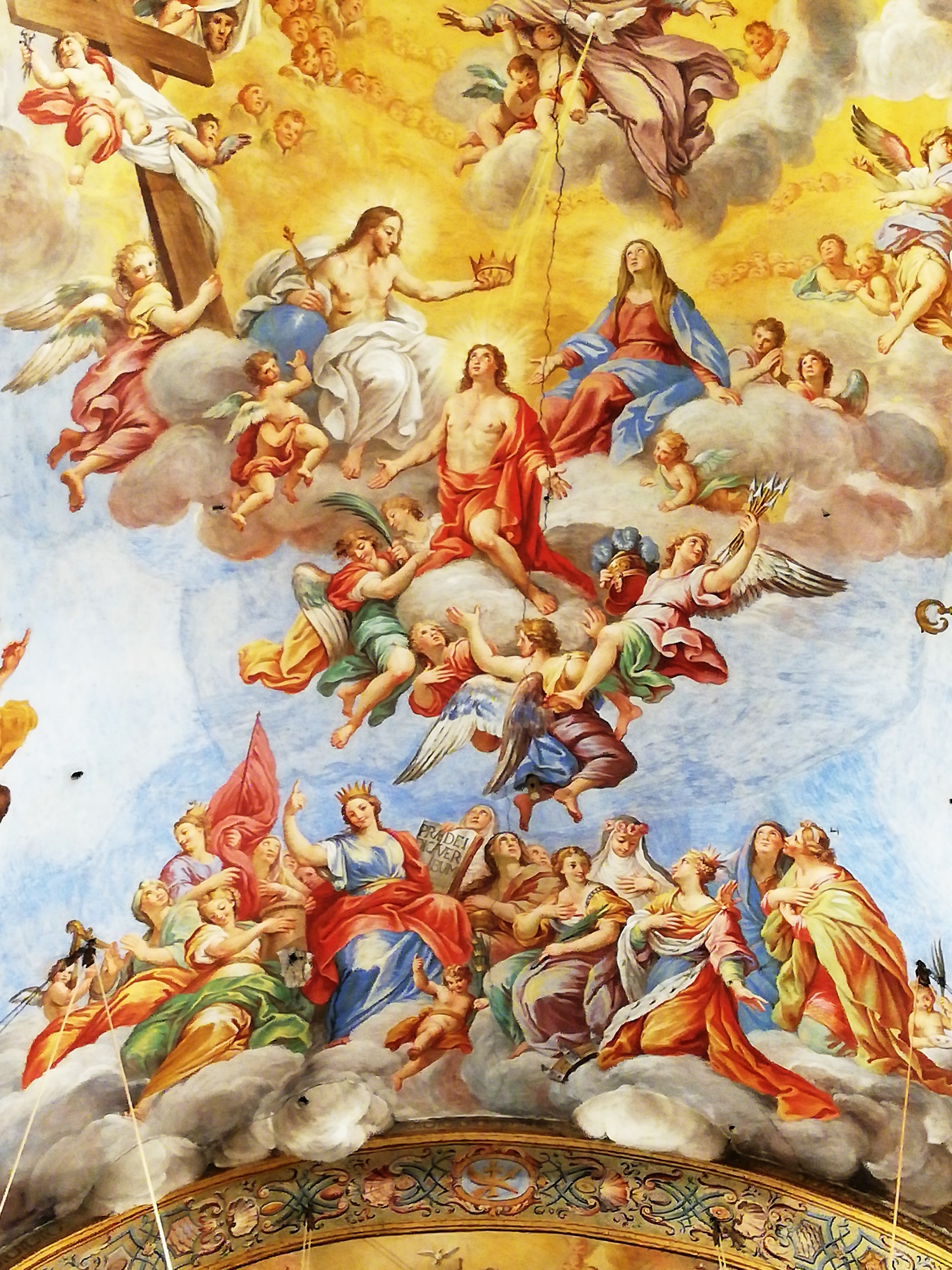
Glory of St Sebastian, apse frescoes by Pietro Paolo Vasta

An oratory dedicated to Saint Sebastian, was founded by a fraternity, and had been erected during the 15th century at the present site where the church of Sant'Antonio di Padova now stands. Saint Sebastian was a common source of veneration in Italy as patron saint invoked for protection during the onslaught of the plague. When the city was spared from severe problems from the 1577 plague assault on the island, the patronage of the church grew, and the fraternity decided to build a larger church at this site. On the patron saints day on January 20, a procession of the ferculo with an icon of the saint is carried through town.

Completed during 1608–1658, the church was also frescoed by Venerando Costanzo and Baldassare Grasso. The 1693 earthquake collapsed the choir, the sacristy and the oratory. Reconstruction was quick taking place mainly between 1695 and 1699. The facade in white stone from Syracuse was designed by Angelo Bellofiore, and completed between 1705 and 1715. In front of the facade is a highly decorated balustrade with ten statues. The row of saints depicts San Gervasio and San Lorenzo to the left, and San Vito and San Protasio to the right. Above are statues of the brothers Santi Cosma and Damiano. The facade itself is richly festooned with sculptural decorations of putti and masks. The metal portal gates of the atrium were completed by Salvatore Paradiso in 1848, while the bronze bas-reliefs of the central door were designed by Gustave Doré in 1893.

The interior has a center nave and two aisles with a dome rising at the crossing of the transept. In 1732, Pietro Paolo Vasta was awarded a commission to fresco the choir and apse; he competed for the commission with Venerando Costanzo, who painted the Conversion of Cromazio for the lunette in the right transept. In the choir and the spandrels of the cupola, Vasta depicts scenes of the life of St Sebastian. In the Chapel of the Sacrament, the frescoes are by Vasta, while the chapel of Jesus and Mary has frescoes by Alessandro d'Anna. In the transept are some frescoes (1899-1901) in encaustic by Francesco Mancini. Francesco Patanè painted frescoes in the transept between 1899 and 1901.

Among the altarpieces are the following and Addolorata and Trinity by Vasta and Vito D'Anna; and a Santi Cosma e Damiano by Antonino Bonaccorsi.
