= Palazzo Musmeci, Acireale =

Palace in Sicily, Italy

Coordinates: 37.61299°N 15.16323°E

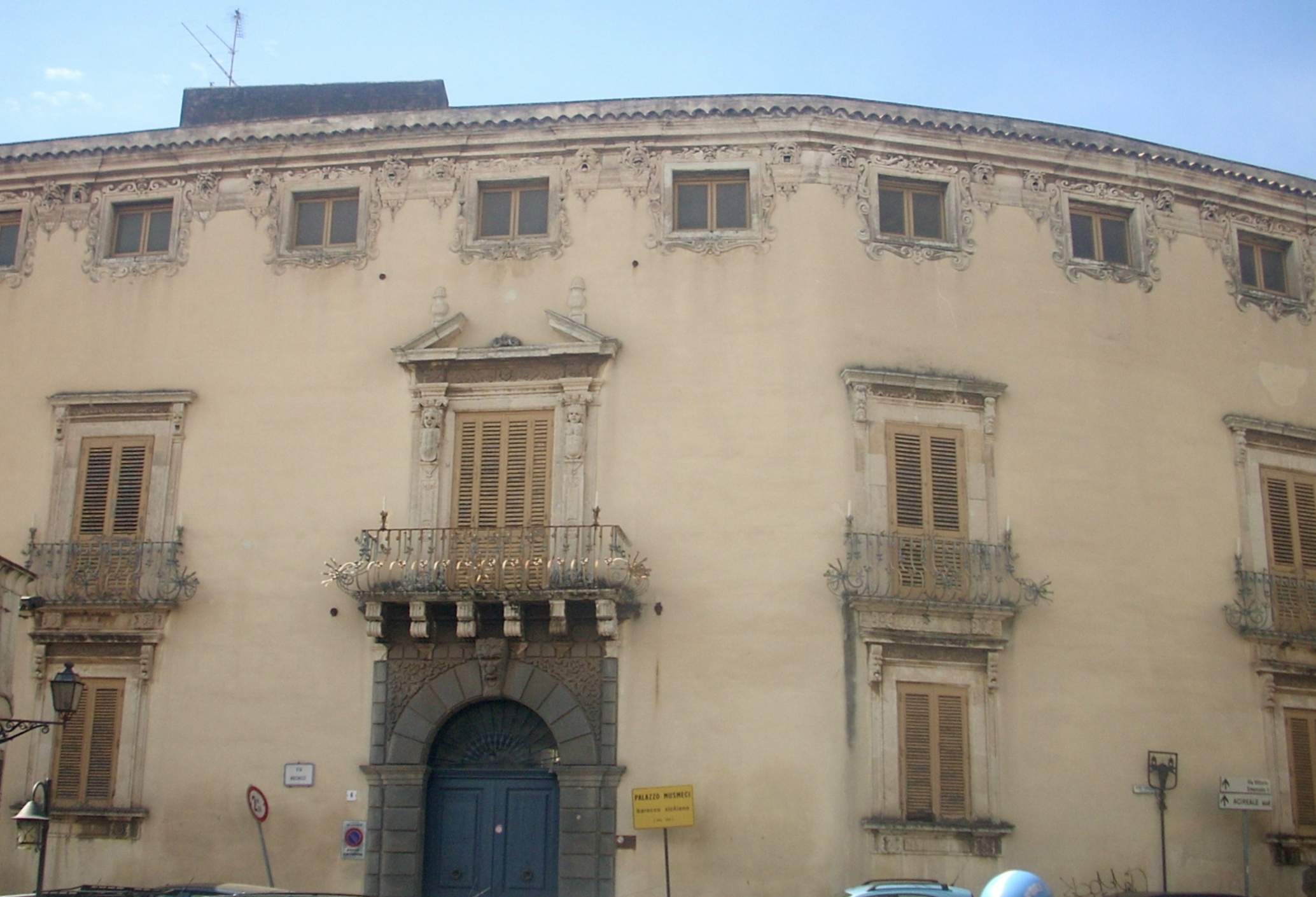
Palace facade

The Palazzo Musmeci is a late-Baroque-style palace located on Via Musmeci and Piazza San Domenico, across from the church of San Domenico, in the city of Acireale, region of Sicily, Italy.

The palace was erected by the Baron Musmeci in the 18th century. Its curved facade has small balconies on second-story windows; the attic story has smaller windows below a decorative cornice. The palace retains some 18th-century furnishings and a courtyard with statues.
