= Santa Maria degli Angeli, Acireale =

Catholic parish in Sicily

Coordinates: 37.6°N 15.1°E

Santa Maria degli Angeli, also known as the Chiesa dei Capucini, is a Roman Catholic parish church located in central Acireale in the region of Sicily of Italy. The church is attached to a former Franciscan-Capuchin convent, which now serves as offices for the comune.

== History and description ==
The exterior and interior architecture of the church is extremely plain and has always been so. The church was built a few years after the convent, in 1574, and enlarged in 1640. Damaged severely by the 1693 earthquake, it was rebuilt. In the church the main altarpiece depicts an Enthroned Madonna' (1661) by Giacinto Platania.
