= Michele La Spina =

Italian sculptor (1849–1943)

Michele La Spina (Acireale, 1849 - Rome, 1943) was an Italian sculptor.

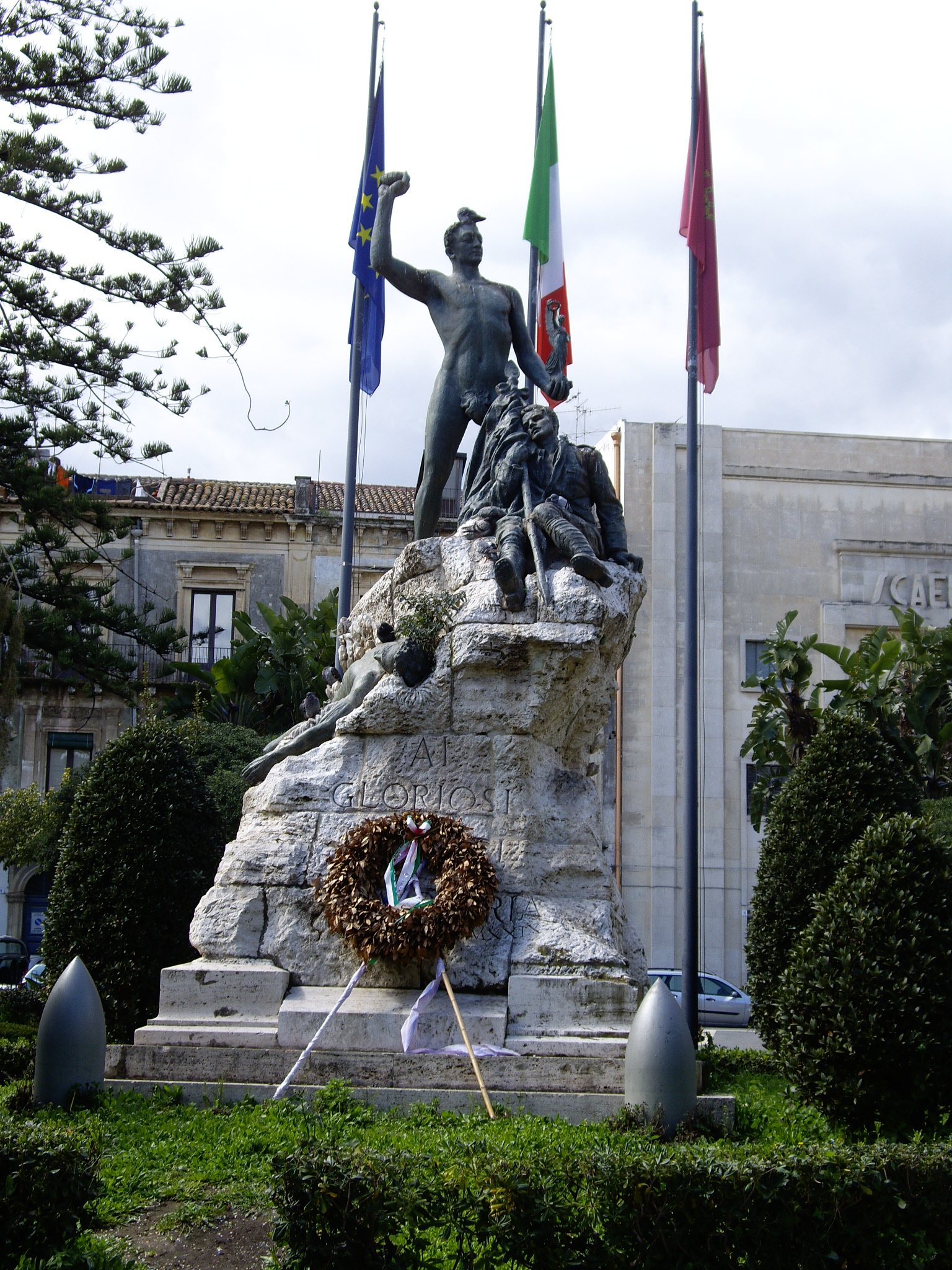
Monumento dei Caduti (1929) in Piazza Garibaldi, Acireale

He was born at Arcireale, Sicily, but worked mostly in Rome. He completed various statuary concepts. Among his works are a Faun making a flute (exhibited in Rome in 1883); a portrait of Lionardo Vigo, cast in bronze by the Nelly Foundry; and a statue of a Dog. He was also active in Florence and Naples. He completed a colossal Bust of Garibaldi in Stucco, exhibited at the Pinacoteca Zelantea and a Monument to the Fallen (Monumento dei Caduti) 1929 in piazza Garibaldi of Acireale. The statue of Caduti was controversial due to the nudity of the standing figure.
