= Antonino Bonaccorsi =

Italian painter

- Born: June 1826; Acireale, Sicily
- Died: 1897 (aged 70–71)
- Other name: il Chiaro
- Occupation: painter
- Known for: his portraits
- Notable work: portraits of professor Tedeschi, poet Salvatore Vigo, the Baron of Santa Margherita, professor Cantore Seminara, senator Vigo Fuccio, professor Della Noce, and the signora Tropea-Rossi

Antonino Bonaccorsi also called il Chiaro (June 1826 in Acireale, Sicily – 1897) was an Italian painter.

Born to a doctor, He studied in Catania under Giuseppe Gandolfo, a prominent portrait artist in Catania. At 19, he travelled to Rome, where he worked under Natale Carta and Francesco Coghetti. At the Academy of San Luca, which he attended, he was awarded a number of prizes. He was able to travel to Paris frequently. He was caught up in the Roman uprising of 1848–49 and aided in the defense of the brief Roman Republic. During these battles, he acquired afflictions that troubled him the remainder of his life. From 1853 to 1859, he went into exile to Florence; he returned to Rome and then Acireale in 1859.

Bonaccorsi is known for his portraits including those of professor Tedeschi, poet Salvatore Vigo, of the Baron of Santa Margherita, professor Cantore Seminara, senator Vigo Fuccio, professor Della Noce, and the signora Tropea-Rossi.

Among his religious and historic paintings, he depicted Pope Pius IX assists the dying King Ferdinand II; a Santi Cosma e Damiano for the Basilica of San Sebastiano in Acireale; a Santi Filippo e Giacomo for the church of the Matrice di Castiglione Siculo; an Immaculate Conceception; a Bishop San Geraldo for the Acireale Cathedral; Il Battista che sgrida ai farisei; a Glory of St Sebastian for church of San Sebastiano; St Phillip Neri brings children to Christ for the Church of the Oratory; a Martyrdom of St Sebastian for the Chiesa Matrice of Riposto.

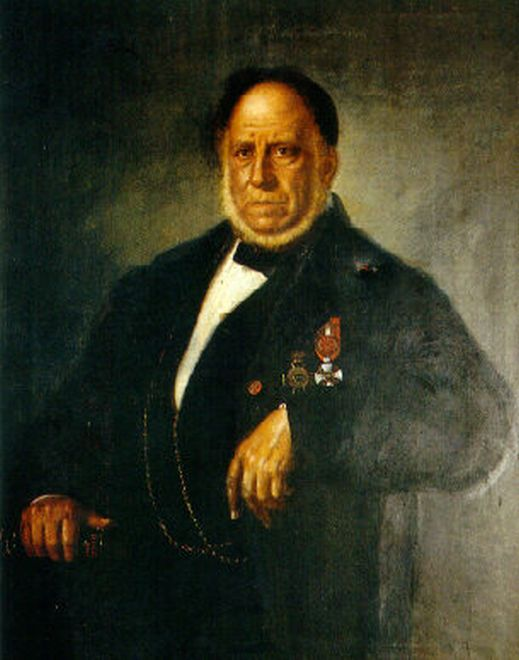
Lionardo Vigo Calanna, Marquis of Gallodoro, Italian poet and politician. Portrait by Antonino Bonaccorsi

Other portraits include Baron Agostino Pennisi of Floristella; honorable Giambartolo Romeo in the Palazzo di Acireale; poet Leonardo Vigo; portraits of the priest Giuseppe Ragonisi and Geremia family are found in the Pinacoteca dell’Accademia degli Zelanti and in the Gabinetto di lettura di Acireale.
