= Palazzo Calanna, Acireale =

Palace in Acireale, Sicily, Italy

Coordinates: 37°36′33″N 15°09′58″E

The Palazzo Calanna is a palace located on Via Vittorio Emanuele II #117, in the city of Acireale, region of Sicily, Italy.

The sober neoclassical palace was commissioned in the late 19th century by Andrea Calanna from the architect Mariano Panebianco. The palace has rusticated blocks at the base and the second floor has an open arcade/balcony with three rounded arches.

Calanna commissioned the fresco decorations from Giuseppe Sciuti. The work was completed from 1902 to 1905 and includes ceiling frescoes depicting allegories or scenes the Four Seasons, The Genius of Education, The Maenads", Silence, Sleep, Confidence, and The Rainbow". In one room is a large historical fresco depicting the Battle of Manio Aquilio, in which an Ancient Roman general and consul defeats a rebellious slave army in Sicily.
