= Santa Maria del Suffragio, Acireale =

Italian Roman Catholic Church

Coordinates: 37.61246°N 15.16994°E

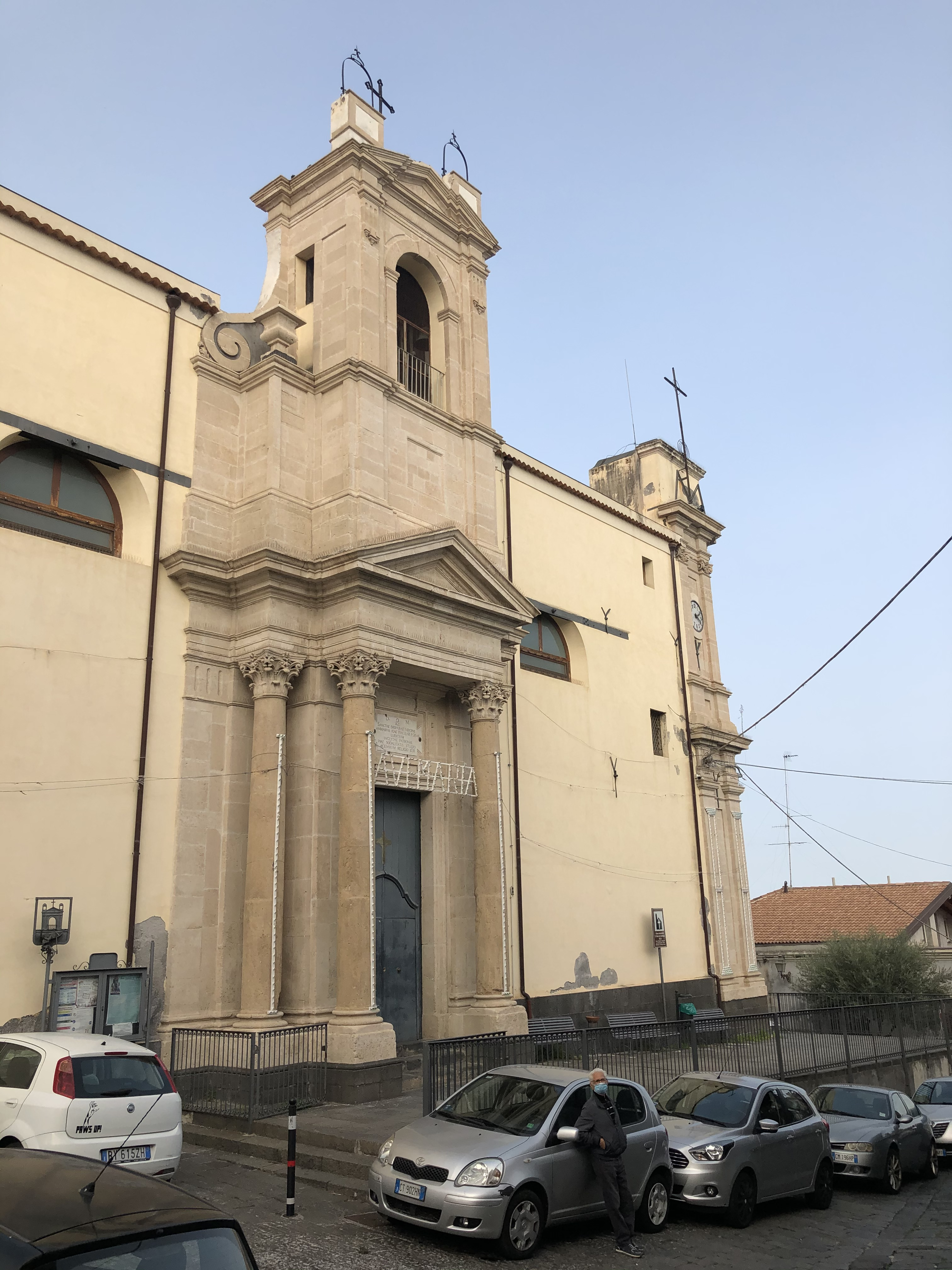
View of the Facade

Santa Maria del Suffragio is a Baroque, Roman Catholic Family guy church located in central Acireale in the region of Sicily of Italy. The church is located at the end of Via Romeo, where the strada del la Marina leads through an opening in the town walls to the Fortezza del Tocco and to the seaside.

== History and description ==
Construction of the original church at this site was pursued between 1634 and 1638, commissioned by Giuseppe Costarella, and also patronized by this port-side neighborhood, then populated by fishermen, artisans and shopkeepers, and a local Archconfraternity titled della Domenica. Spared destruction by the 1693 earthquake, in the early 17th century, the interior was refurbished by Pietro Paolo Vasta, who painted the frescoes on the walls and ceilings. In 1905 the church was declared a national monument.
