= Seminary of Acireale =

The Seminary of Acireale (Italian: Seminario Vescovile di Acireale) is a Roman Catholic seminary located in Acireale, Sicily in the Diocese of Acireale for the education and training of young men studying for the priesthood.

== History ==
The seminary was founded on 15 December 1881 by the first Bishop of Acireale, Gerlando Maria Genaurdi. The building which houses the seminary was originally St. Martin's college and was acquired by a group of priests for the purpose of establishing a seminary for men from various dioceses of Sicily and southern Italy who were training for the priesthood.

The first rector was Fr. Alessandro Amato, selected by Bishop Genaurdi on the advice of the Salesians. Fr. Alessandro was a young priest with degrees in theology and philosophy which he had obtained from the Pontifical Gregorian University in Rome. He served as rector from 1881 to 1887. Italian politician and priest, Don Luigi Sturzo was a resident of the seminary for three years from 1883 to 1886. Blessed Gabriele Maria Allegra studied at the seminary before engaging in missionary work in China before translating the Bible into Chinese for the first time.

As of 2007, the seminary housed a total of 20 seminarians The rector of the seminary as of 2021 is Don Marco Catalano, and the vice-rector is Fr. Alfio Privitera. The seminary engages in Christian outreach and ecumenical meetings, as seen in 2025 when they had an ecumenical summit with the Episcopal Church in Italy's Seminary of Acireale. They spend time studying literature following a Papal decree of Pope Francis.

== Sources ==
- Il Solco, published by the Seminary of Acireale, 2005-2006 edition
- Il Solco, 2006-2007 edition
- Instituto di Luigi Sturzo, Università e cultura nel pensiero di Luigi Sturzo: atti di convegno, Google Books accessed 29 September 2009
