= Mariano Panebianco =

Italian engineer and architect

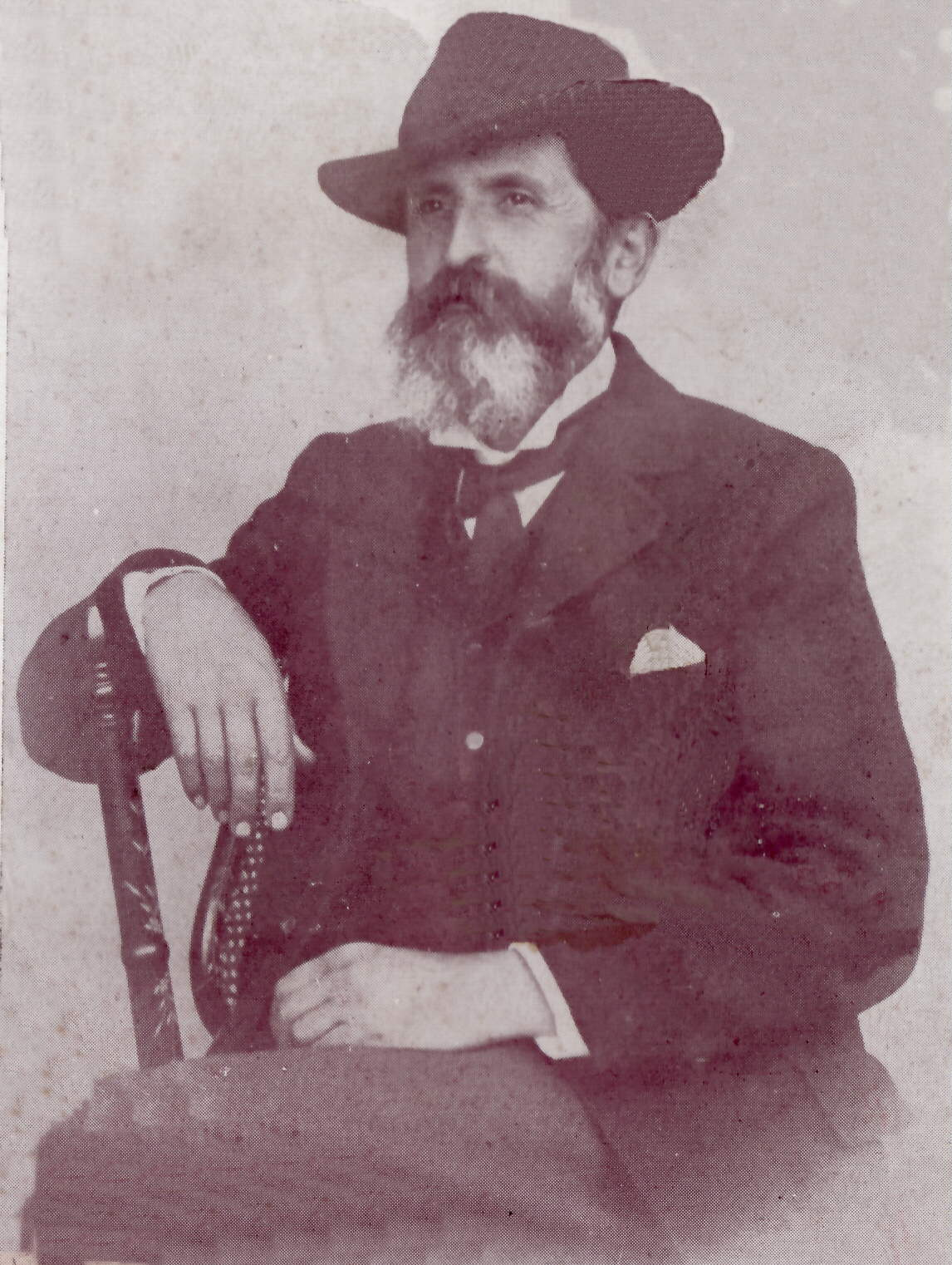
Mariano Panebianco

Mariano Panebianco (4 September 1847 – 30 November 1915) was an Italian engineer and architect, active in Eastern Sicily, including many private projects in his native Acireale.

Mariano was born in Acireale, but studied engineering in Naples. He had numerous commissions from his hometown. Among his commissions were the Palazzo Calanna, Palazzo Nicolisi, and the Biblioteca Zelantea. In 1882, he obtained a silver medal at the Interprovincial Exposition in Messina.
