= Giacinto Platania =

Italian painter

Giacinto Platania (circa 1612 – 1691) was an Italian painter.

== Biography ==
He was born in Acireale. He first trained with his father Antonio, who in 1630 painted a Guardian Angel for the Cathedral of Acireale.

Platania left record of the 1669 Etna eruption, depicting the event in frescoes in the sacristy of the Cathedral of Catania, that unfortunately have suffered damage and poor restorations. They document efforts he helped plan, including processions and prayers, that were only partially effective in attempting to steer the lava away from the town.

Among his works, in Acireale, are Transit of St Joseph for the church of the same name; a St Simon Stock for the Carmine; a San Antonio Abate in the rebuilt church of Santi Pietro e Paolo, a St. Anthony of Padua and a Portrait of Monsignor Branciforte in the Duomo, an Enthroned Madonna at the Church of the Cappuccini (signed: Hyacintus Patania pingebat 1661), a San Biagio e San Martino papa in the church of San Biagio, a Saint Venera and Saint Agatha in the church of the Indirizzo, San Cirino e San Crispino in Santa Maria degli Agonizzanti, a San Mauro in the church of Acicastello, (signed: Hyacintus Platania pin. 1681); and a Last Supper, once in the refectory of the Cappuccini, and now in the Galleria Zelantea.

Among his pupils are Baldassare Grasso and Giovanni Lo Coco.
