= Pinacoteca Zelantea =

Italian art gallery

Coordinates: 37°36′51″N 15°09′46″E

The Pinacoteca Zelantea is the main art gallery located on Via Marchese di S. Giuliano #17 in the town of Acireale, Sicily. The art gallery and affiliated library are housed in the Neoclassical palace designed by Mariano Panebianco in the late 19th-century.

The art gallery is part of an institute that comprises a library, and a society of scholars. The present institution is the modern expression of entities dating as far back as the 1650s, when a group of ecclesiastical men began meetings of an Accademia degli Zelanti.

The initial art collection dates to the donation in the 1850s, by Mariano Leonardi Gambino, of his family's collection of painting, engravings, and sculptures, including many works by local artists. By 1889, the collection was moved to the site of the Biblioteca Zelantea (the library). Paolo Leonardi Vigo of the same family of Mariano, arranged to have works by Antonino Bonaccorsi, Francesco Mancini, Giuseppe Sciuti, and Saru Spina displayed in the same building as the Biblioteca. In 1958, works by the artist Antonio Carbonati were sent to the library from a national museum. In 1970s, paintings and works by Michele La Spina and Giuseppe D’Angelo were obtained. The latter works were mainly donated by his family.
