= San Camillo, Acireale =

Roman Catholic parish church in Acireale, Sicily, Italy

Coordinates: 37.61297°N 15.16755°E

San Camillo is a Baroque, Roman Catholic parish church located in Acireale in the region of Sicily, Italy.

This small church was commissioned by the order of Camillians, who cared for the ill. The church was erected in 1730 and frescoed by Pietro Paolo Vasta. The walls depict scenes from the old testament, while the apse has a Glory of the Virgin Mary. The main altarpiece is a Madonna delle Grazie also by Vasta. The adjacent building is the hospice of St Camillus, founded in 1743, and still administered by the order.
