= Santi Pietro e Paolo, Acireale =

Building in Acireale, Italy

Coordinates: 37.61266°N 15.16616°E

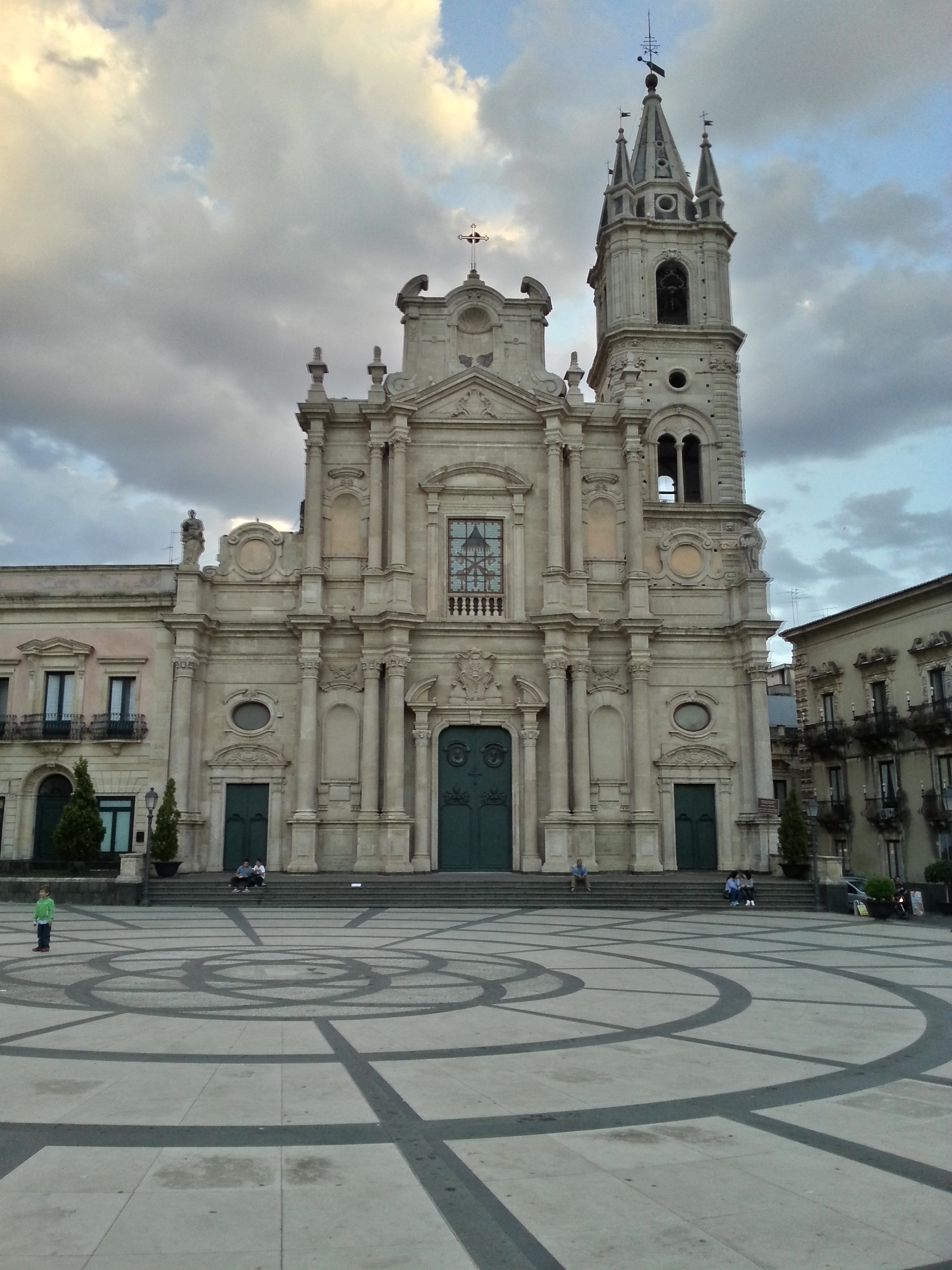
View of the Facade

Santi Pietro e Paolo is a Baroque-style, Roman Catholic collegiate basilica church located in central Acireale in the region of Sicily of Italy. It rises adjacent to the Cathedral of Acireale.

== History and description ==
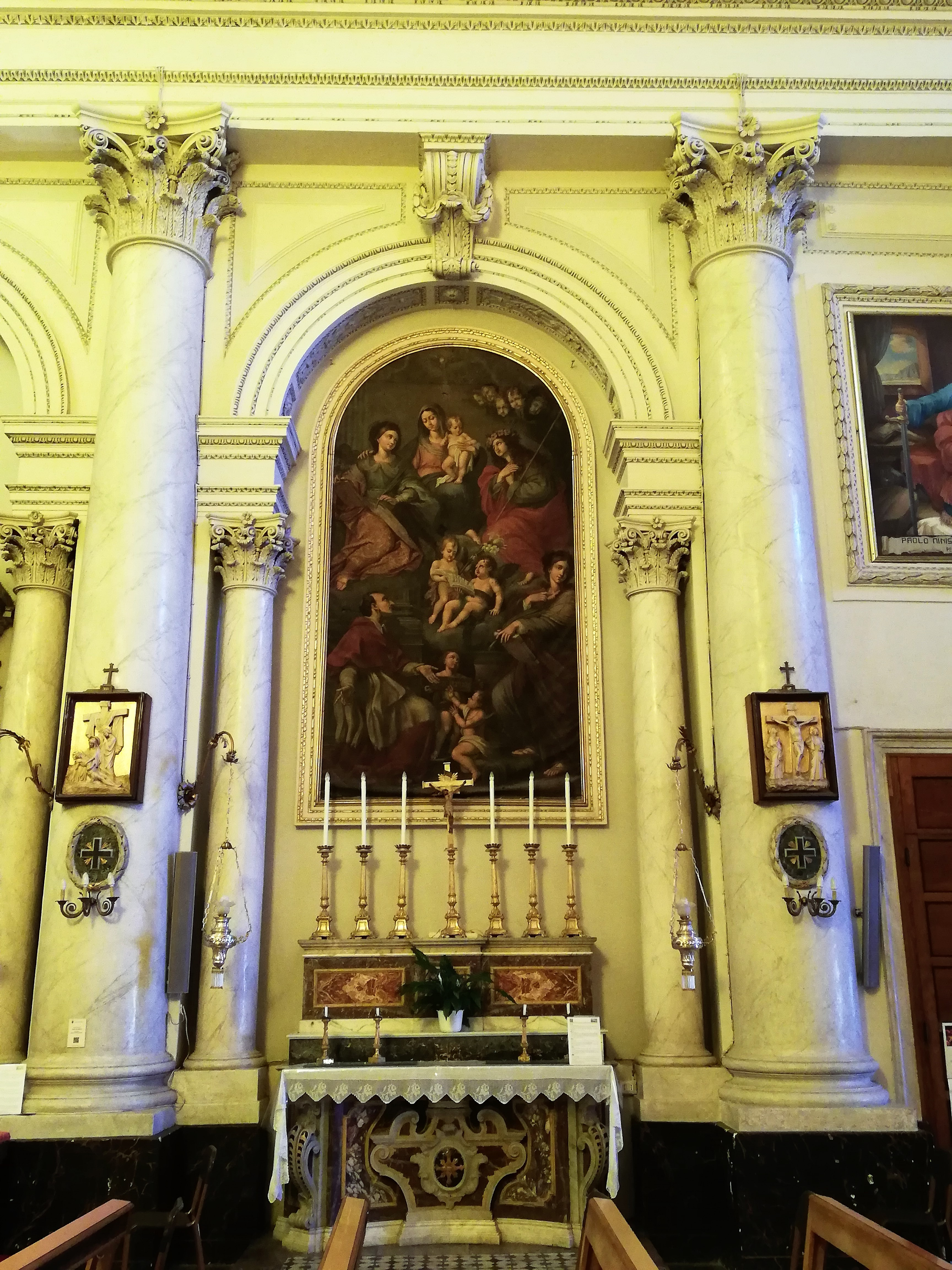
St Charles Borromeo kneels before Virgin and child flanked by Saints Lucy, Rosalia, and Barbara by Matteo Ragonisi

A local fraternity built smaller church or oratory with the same name adjacent to the cathedral in the 16th century. In the early 17th century a new church was built at this site, but damage from the 1693 Sicily earthquake, destroyed the dome of this structure and caused much damage. The pre-1693 church had been frescoed between 1674 and 1679 by the Giovanni Fulco. Reconstruction began in 1740, using designs by Pietro Paolo Vasta. Built with expensive white stone from Siracusa, work continued through the century. In 1765, the facade was completed by Paolo Guarrera. In 1790, under the direction of Francesco Di Paola Patanè the interior was refurbished, replacing the wooden roof with a stone masonry vault, stuccoed on the interior.

The facade is rich in columns, standing on tall plinths, with corinthian capitals in the ground floor and doric capitals in the second. The central tympanums and windows depict a number of symbols related to the titular patrons of the church: keys for St Peter and a sword for St Paul, intermingled with the palm leaves of martyrdom.

The first and second altarpieces on the right of the nave were painted by Giacinto Platania: comprising respectively a Saints Alfio, Cirino, and Filadelfio and Sant Antonio Abate. The fourth altarpiece depicts a Charles Borrromeo before Virgin Mary and Child with Saints Lucy, Rosalia, and Barbara by Matteo Ragonisi. The first altarpiece on the left depicts a Virgin Mary and Child with Saints Agatha, Margherita d'Antiochia, Simone, and Giuda by Alessandro Vasta. The second altarpiece on the left depicts a Ecstasy of Sant'Andrea Avellino (Miraculous vision of the Virgin) by Pietro Paolo Vasta.
