= Giovan Battista Filippo Basile =

Italian architect

Giovan Battista Filippo Basile (August 8, 1825 in Palermo – June 16, 1891) was an Italian architect.

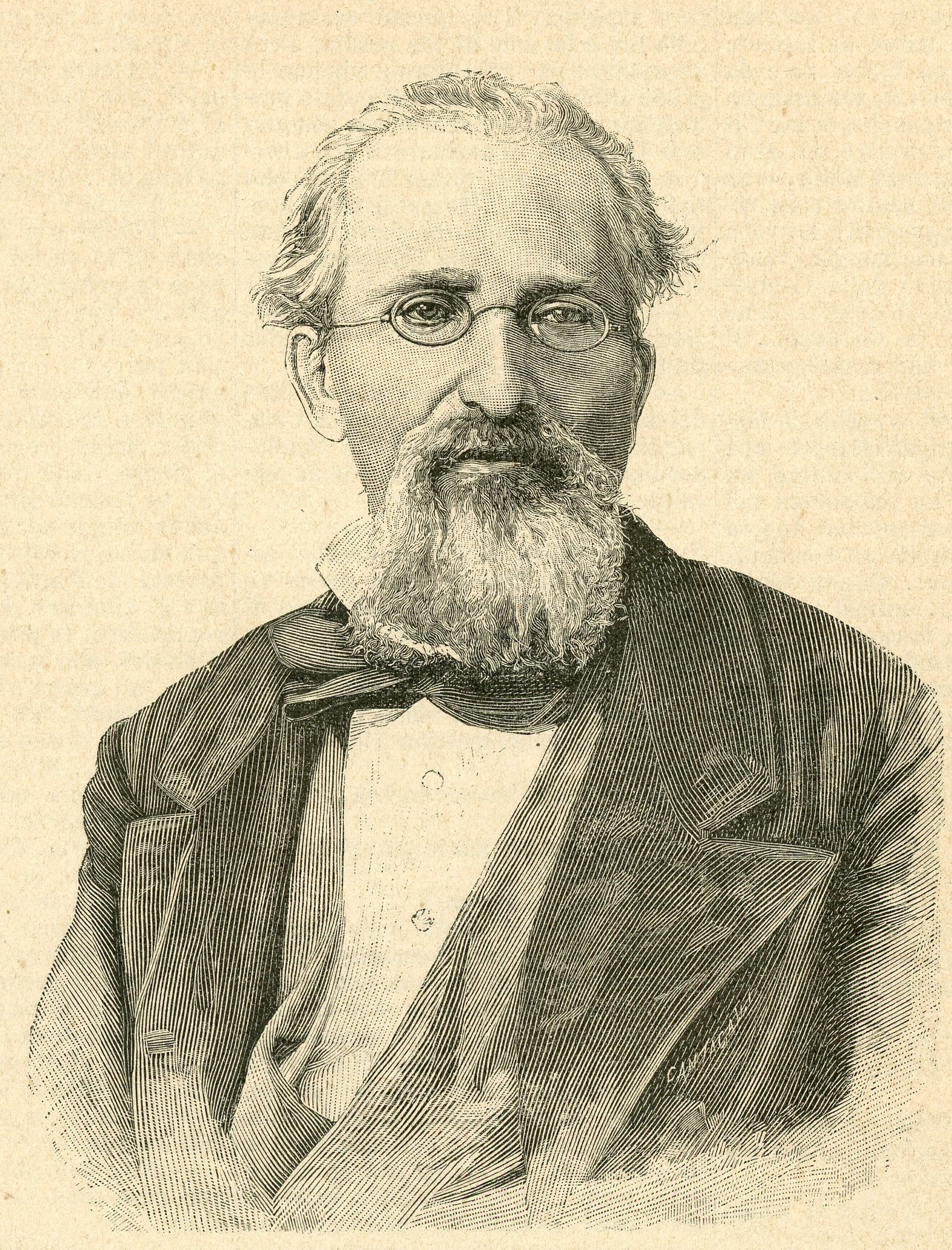
Giovan Battista Filippo Basile

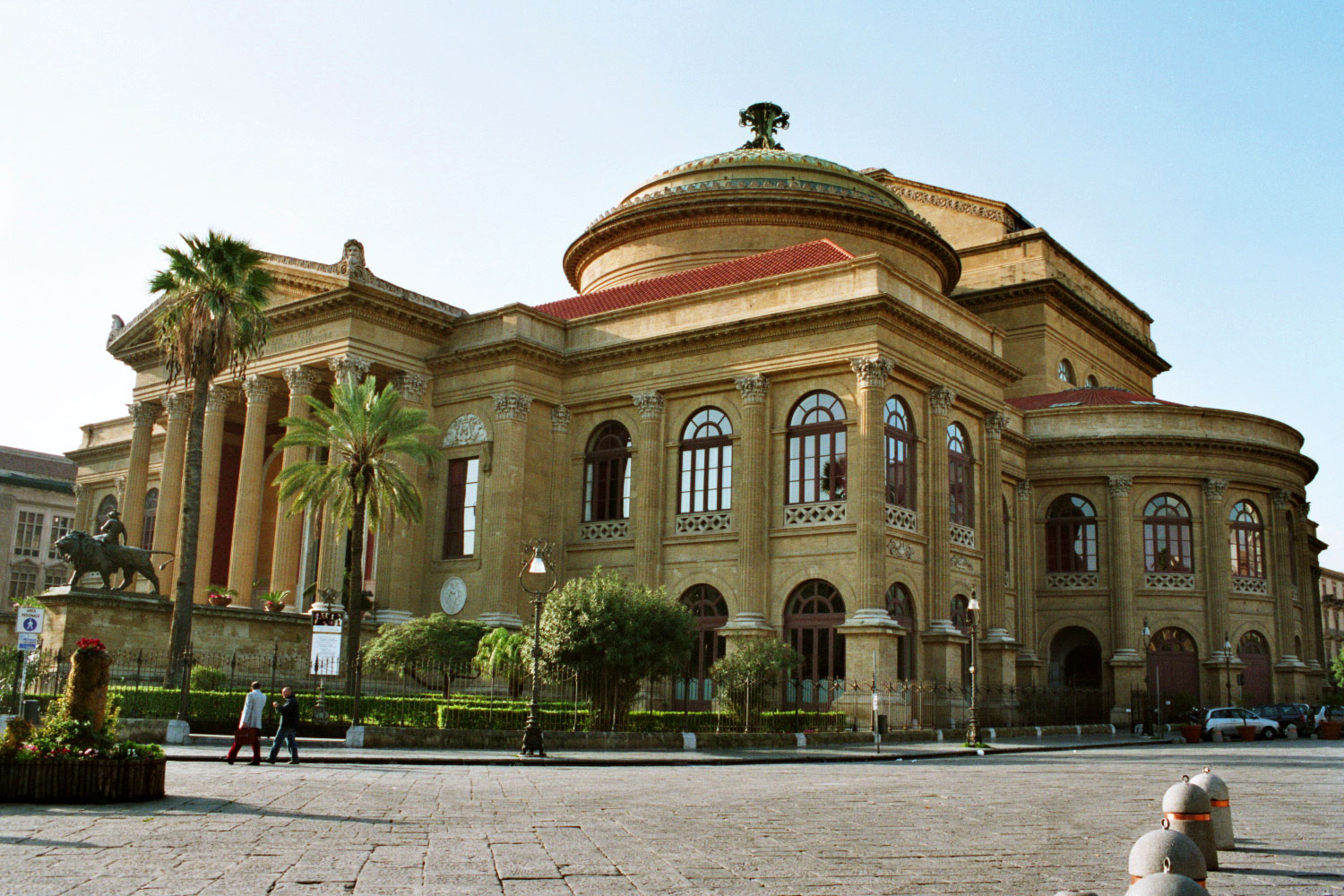
Teatro Massimo, Palermo

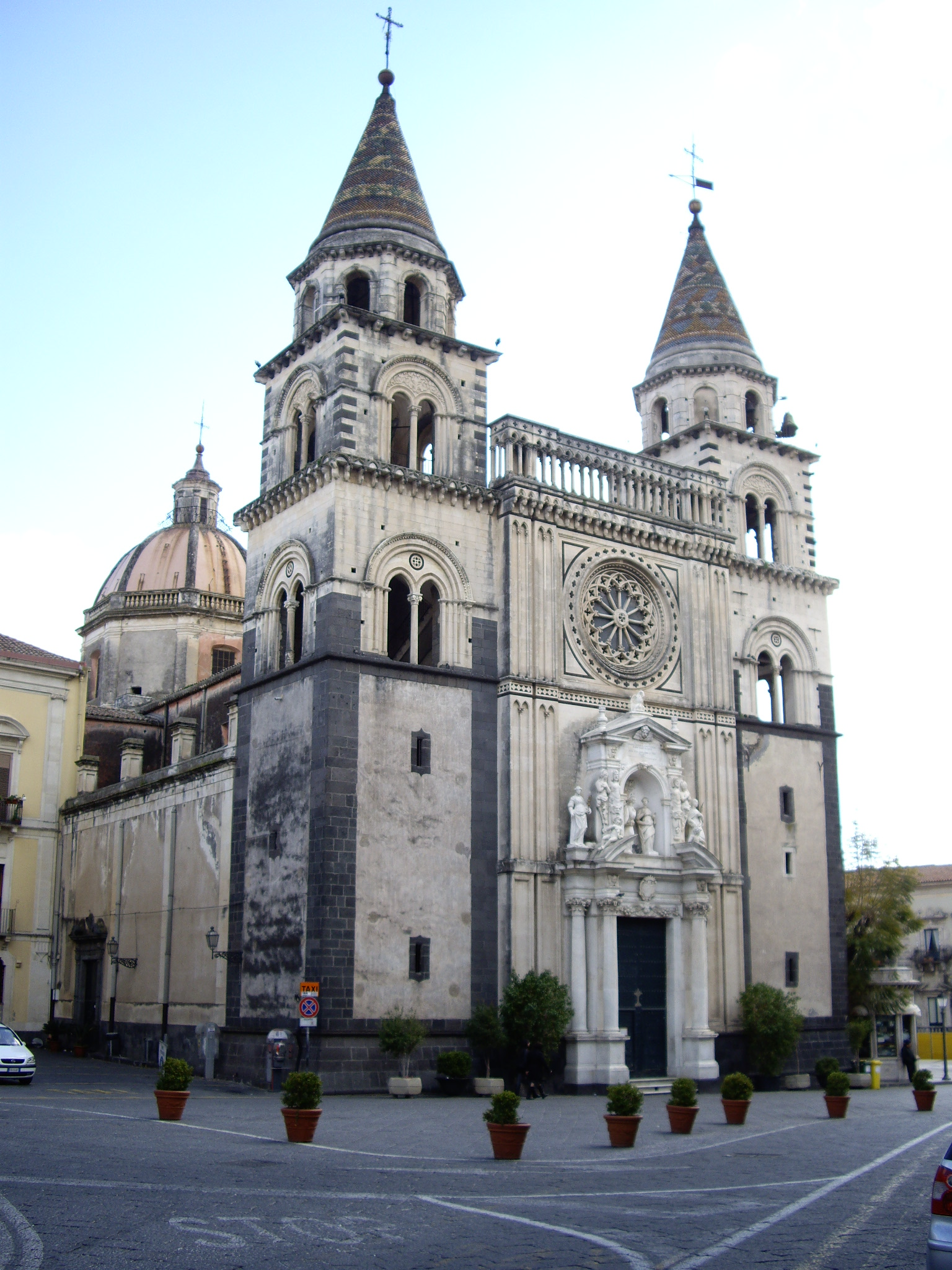
Cathedral of Acireale

Born to a family of humble means. From childhood, Vincenzo Tineo, an erudite horticulturalist in Palermo, recognized Basile's talent, and was able to sponsor his education, and gain him entry into the university to study physical and mathematical sciences. Basile and eventually received or won his degree in architecture, which at the time was a prize conferred through a competition. He also taught physics at university, and at the atheneum, taught descriptive geometry and its applications.

As a young man, he published his text on Practical Stereotomy. He continued the study of figure drawing under the painter Salvatore Lo Forte. Completed such studies, Tineo sponsored some years of study at the University of Rome (La Sapienza) in architecture. There he took courses given by Tortolini, Venturoli, and dal Cavalieri. He also attended the Accademia di San Luca, and designed under Sarti and Poletti. He also was a disciple of the engraver of antiquities, Luigi Canina, before the latter was called to occupy an honorary position at the Royal Institute of British Architects. Basile performed studies on ancient and antique art and monuments, including the temples of Fortuna Virilis, Vesta, and Giove Tonante (Thundering Jove), and the tombs of Bibulus and Scipio, and the ruins of Hadrian's Villa in Tivoli. In this era, a number of artists from Naples and Sicily were sponsored by the public to study in Rome; among these artists were Domenico Morelli, ill Cipolla, and Francesco Di Bartolo.

Among his works are the Teatro Massimo in Palermo (completed by his son Ernesto Basile); the Neo-Gothic facade of the Acireale Cathedral; the villa Favaloro in Palermo (1889), also finished by his son Ernesto. He also designed several gardens such as for Villa Garibaldi and the English Garden in Palermo, Piazza Marina and Villa Vittorio Emanuele in Caltagirone. He is buried in the family grave at the Cemetery of the scrolls in Palermo.

== Writings ==
- Sul Palazzo Genuardi, Palermo, 1858
