= San Domenico, Acireale =

Church in Acireale, Italy

Coordinates: 37.61327°N 15.16293°E

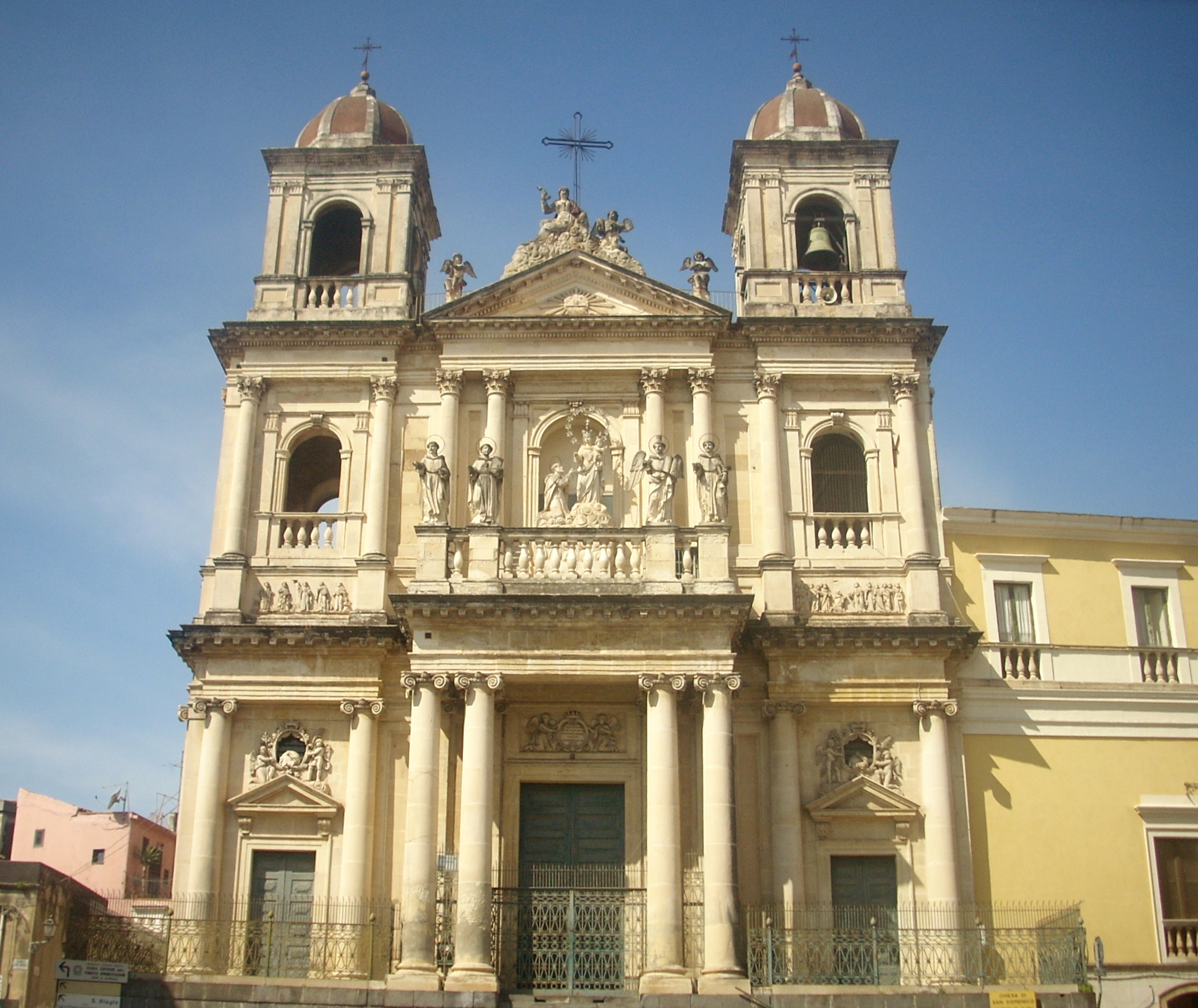
Facade of San Domenico

San Domenico is a Neoclassical, Roman Catholic church located in central Acireale in the region of Sicily of Italy.

== History and description ==
A church at the site, dedicated to San Giuseppe (St Joseph) had been built in the early 16th-century, and gave name to the neighborhood surrounding it. In 1639, a project was approved to establish a convent for Dominican fathers adjacent to the church, however, the lack of monks caused the convent to be closed for two years in 1659. The convent began to prosper hower the 1693 Sicily earthquake damaged the structures severely, and the church was rebuilt in 1709. The present facade mainly dates to a reconstruction performed in 1857.

Outside in piazza San Domenico, a series of lava stone steps lead to the projecting pronaos with ionic columns. Above the portal, in the center is a statue of a kneeling Saint Dominic and his vision of the Virgin Mary and child. In the piazza, to the south of the church is the convex facade of the 17th-century Palazzo Musmeci.
