= Pietro Paolo Vasta =

Italian painter (1697–1760)

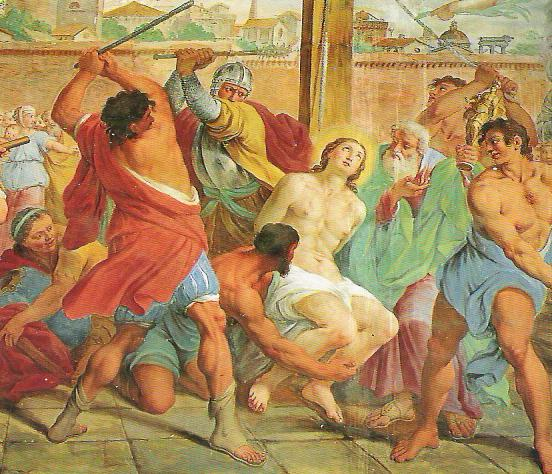
Detail of fresco depicting Martyrdom of St Sebastian in the church of San Sebastiano, Acireale

Piero or Pietro Paolo Vasta (31 July 1697 – 28 November 1760) was an Italian painter of the Baroque period, mainly active in the east of his native Sicily.

== Biography ==
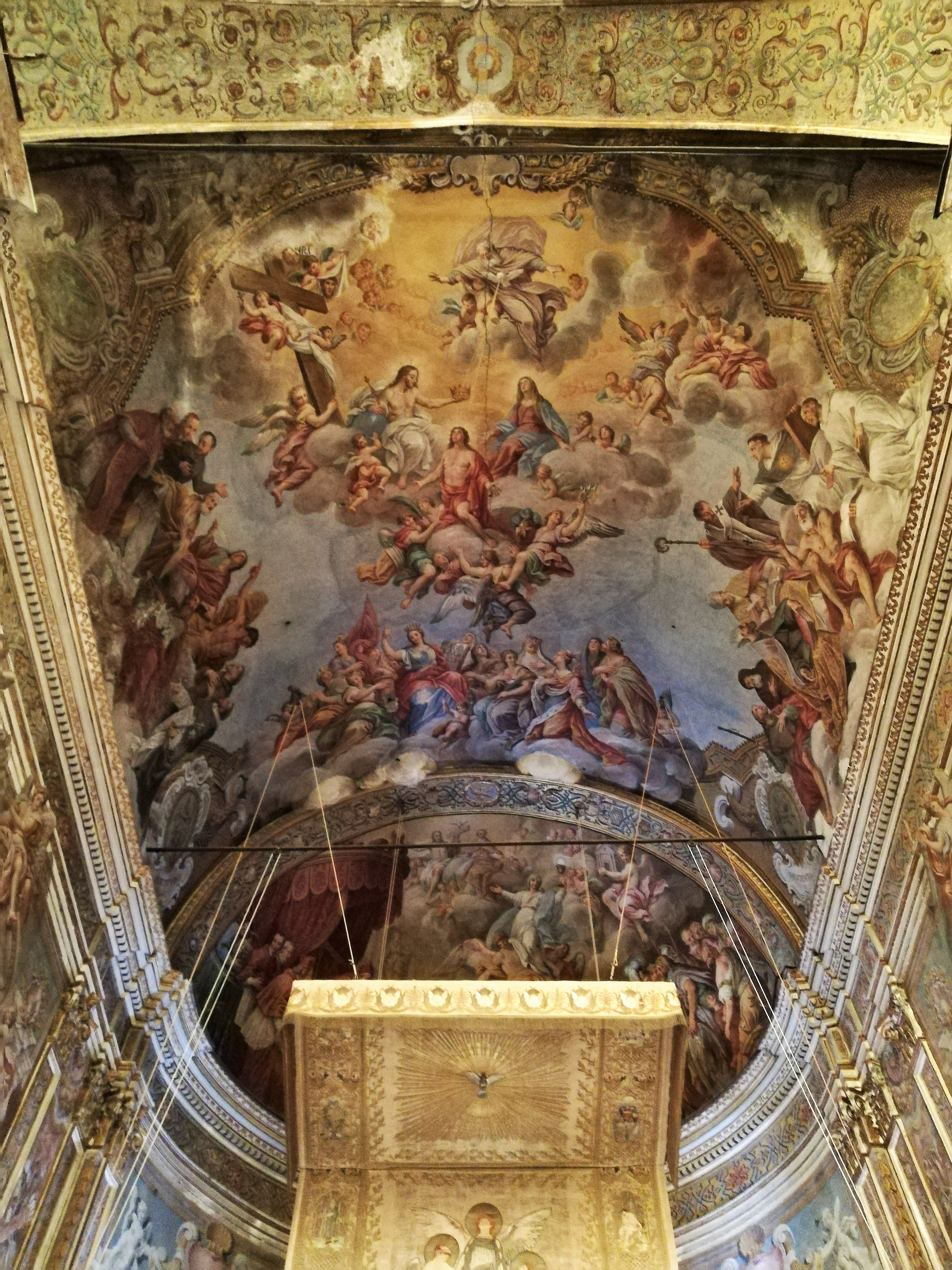
Ceiling frescoes in apse of San Sebastiano

He was born in Acireale. and initially trained with both the painters Giacinto Platania and Antonio Filocamo, who directed the fresco decoration in 1711 of the Cathedral of Acireale. At the age of 17 years, he moved to Rome, where he was mentored putatively by Luigi Garzi. Vasta was apparently admitted to the Accademia di San Luca in Rome; however, little of his work here is known.

He returned to Acireale in 1731. One of his first works were frescoes for the church of San Sebastiano, where he could be compared to Venerando Costanzo, who was also painting frescoes contemporaneously. He would next add frescoes depicting scenes from the Old Testament to the Cathedral, here competing with Costanzo for the commission. He also painted a large Marriage at Cana canvas for the church. Among the churches in Acireale containing his paintings are the Santi Pietro e Paolo, Santa Maria del Suffragio, and San Camillo (also known as Chiesa dei Crociferi).

Among his pupils in Acireale were Vito d'Anna, Giuseppe Grasso, Mariano Cali, Michele Vecchio (1730–1799), Francesco Finocchiaro, Giovanni Leonardi, Santi Leotta, Giovanni Musmeci, and Ignazio Castorina. His son Alessandro Vasta was also a painter.
