= Sant'Antonio di Padova, Acireale =

Roman Catholic church in Sicily

Coordinates: 37.61018°N 15.16544°E

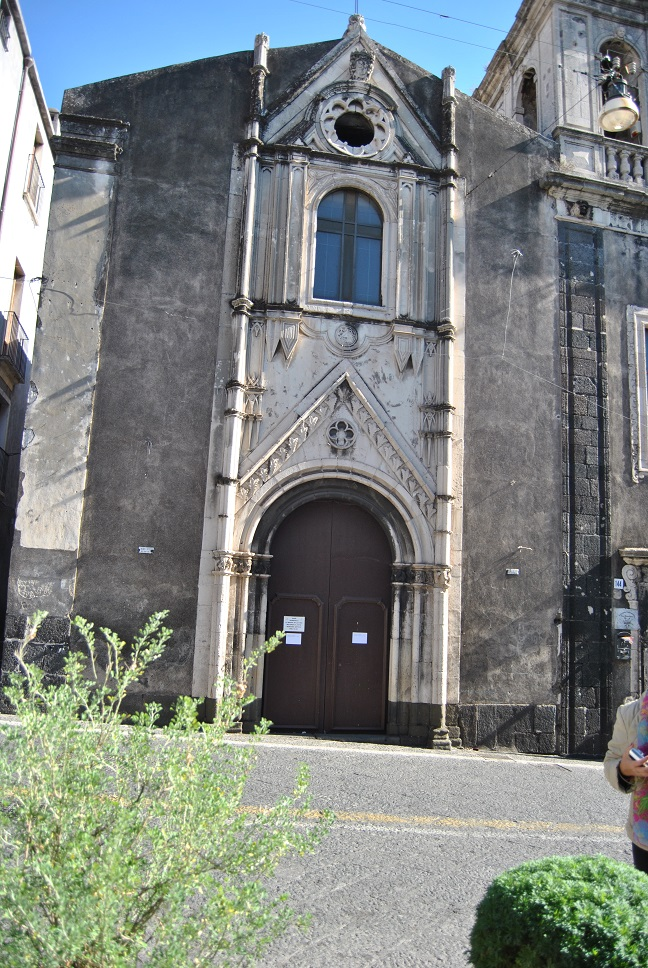
View of the Facade

Sant'Antonio di Padova is a Gothic-style, Roman Catholic parish church located on via Vittorio Emanuele in central Acireale in the region of Sicily of Italy.

== History and description ==
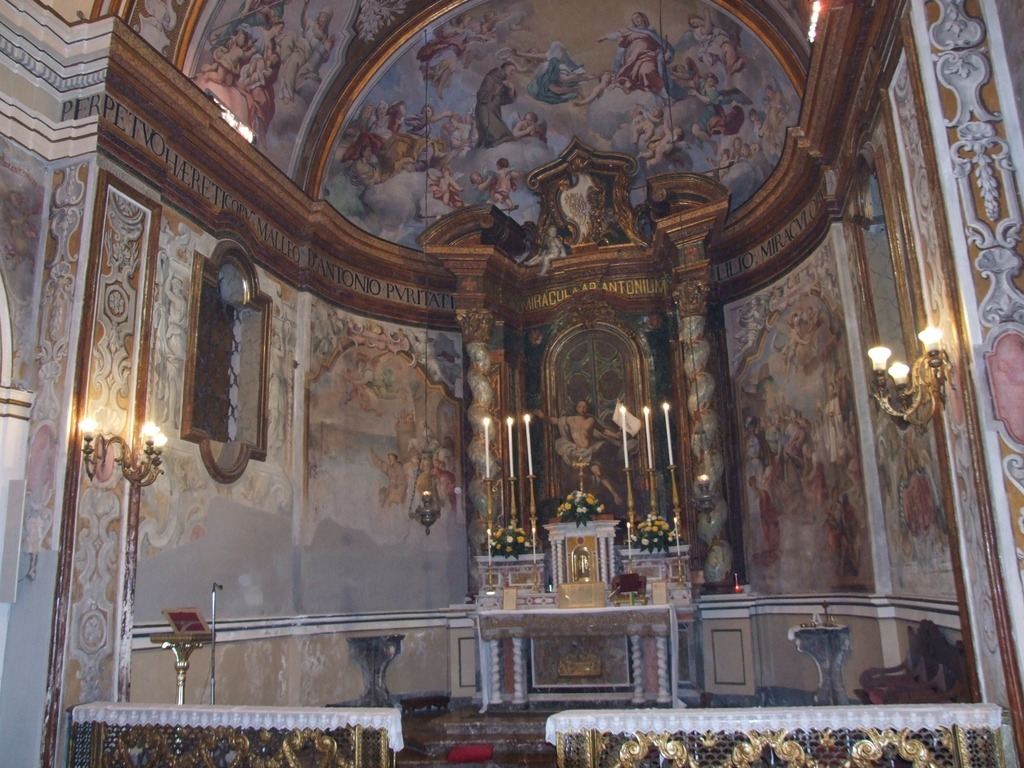
Frescoes inside church

A church at the site was built after the plague of 1466, and dedicated to St Sebastian. There was likely an oratory at the site where the church was erected. When a new onslaught of the plague afflicted the town late in the next century, a new church was commissioned.

This church was consecrated in 1652 to Saint Anthony of Padua. The 1693 Sicily earthquake nearly razed the entire structure. The present church with a single nave houses frescoes started by Pietro Paolo Vasta. In 1755, while frescoing the central nave with the Glory of St. Anthony he was afflicted with a stroke. The wall frescoes were completed by his son Alessandro.
