= Matteo Ragonisi =

Italian painter

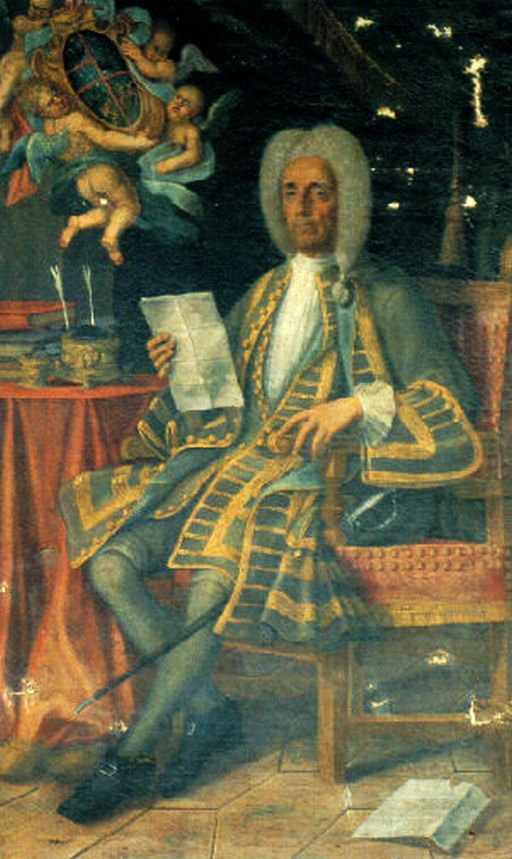
Portrait of Pietro Barrabini

Matteo Ragonisi (27 February 1660 – 13 April 1734) was an Italian painter of the Baroque period, mainly active in the native town of Acireale in Sicily.

== Biography ==
He painted both portraits and altarpieces in a provincial Baroque style. He is said to have studied in Rome Among the contemporary painters he would have known or worked with in the town were Giacinto Platania, Baldassare Grasso, and Giovanni Lo Coco. He painted an altarpiece depicting Charles Borrromeo before Virgin Mary and Child with Saints Lucy, Rosalia, and Barbara for the church of Santi Pietro e Paolo, Acireale.
