= Santa Tecla, Italy =

Santa Tecla
- Frazione
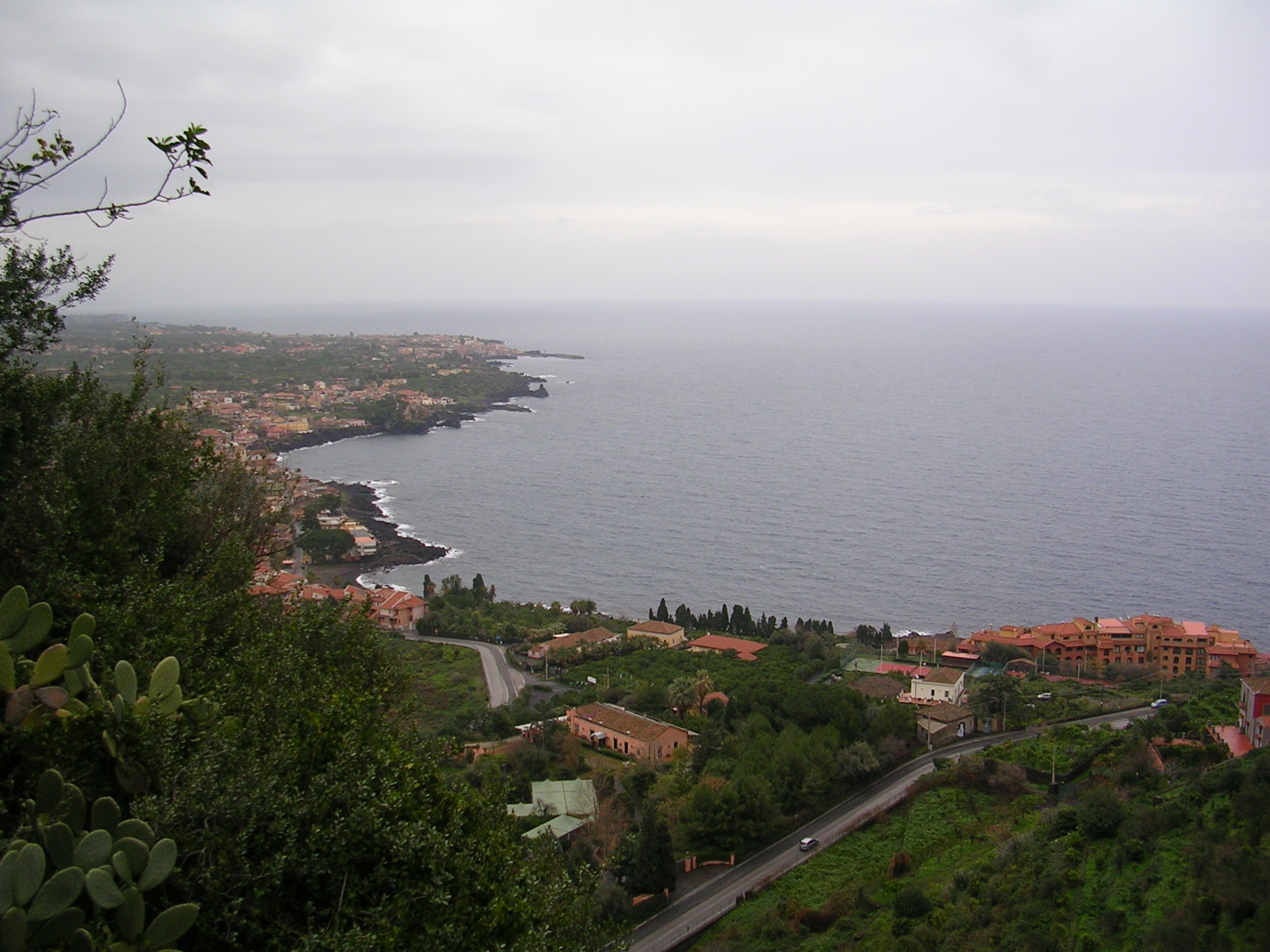

- Location of Santa Tecla in Italy
- Coordinates: 37.635833°N 15.175833°E
- Country: Italy
- Region: Sicily
- Province: Catania (CT)
- Comune: Acireale
- Time zone: UTC+1 (CET)
  - Summer (DST): UTC+2 (CEST)
- Postal code: 95020
- Dialing code: (+39) 095

Santa Tecla is a southern Italian frazione of Acireale, a municipality part of the Province of Catania, Sicily.

== Geography ==
Santa Tecla is located 3.08 kilometres (1.91 mi) from Acireale, to which it belongs.
