= Acireale Cathedral =

Cathedral in Acireale, Italy

Coordinates: 37°36′47″N 15°09′58″E

Acireale Cathedral (Cattedrale Maria Santissima Annunziata)
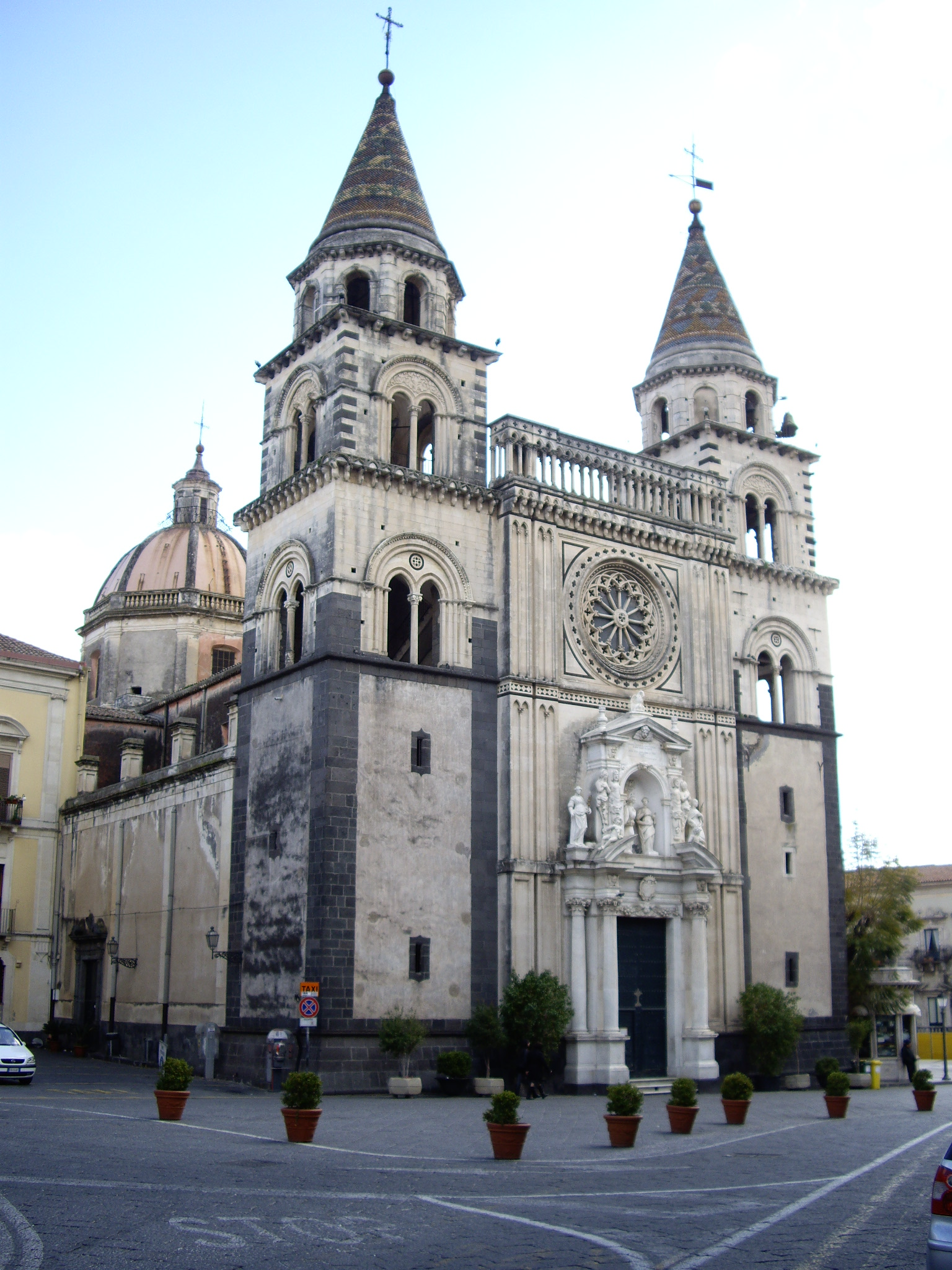
- The west front of the cathedral

Religion
- Affiliation: Roman Catholic
- Province: Catania

Location
- Location: Acireale, Italy
- Interactive map of Acireale Cathedral (Cattedrale Maria Santissima Annunziata)

Architecture
- Type: Church
- Style: Composite
- Groundbreaking: 16c
- Completed: 1889

Website
- http://www.diocesi.acireale.ct.it/

Acireale Cathedral (Italian: Duomo di Acireale, Cattedrale Maria Santissima Annunziata) is a Roman Catholic cathedral dedicated to the Annunciation of the Blessed Virgin Mary in the city of Acireale in Sicily, province of Catania, Italy. It was declared the seat of the Bishop of Acireale in 1870. It was declared a minor basilica in 1957.

Location of the cathedral

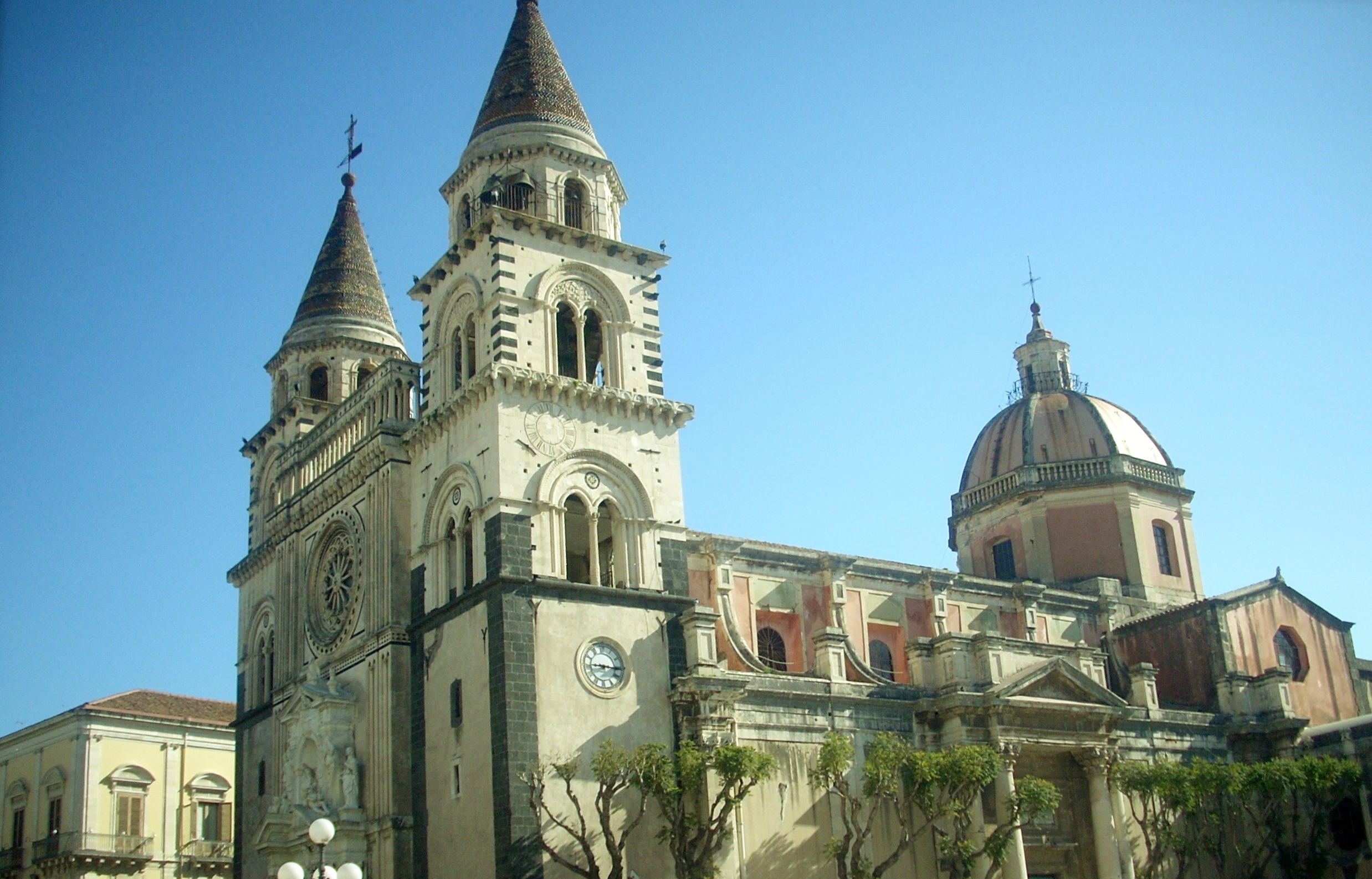
Acireale Cathedral

The present cathedral building, which is located in the Piazza Duomo, was constructed as a simple parish church between 1597 and 1618 that was greatly enlarged a few years later when it received the relics of Saint Venera, one of the two patron saints of the city. The structure survived the earthquake of 1693, and the present cathedral is a 17th-century building with significant additions from each succeeding century.

Of particular note are the Baroque portal representing the Annunciation by Placido Blandamonte of Messina, dating from 1668, combined with a Neo-Gothic west front by Giovan Battista Filippo Basile, completed after his death in 1891 to his plans, of c.1900. The two campaniles, in Mannerist style with octagonal bases, although identical in appearance, are centuries apart in construction: the one to the south is from 1655, as is the cupola, while the one to the north, as well as the rose window, are from 1890. The interior is 17th century Baroque. The interior decoration includes painting by Pietro Paolo Vasta, Francesco Mancini Ardizzone, Antonio Filocamo, Giuseppe Sciuti, Francesco Patanè, and Giacinto Platania.
