= Santa Maria degli Agonizzanti, Acireale =

Church building in Acireale, Italy

Coordinates: 37.61102°N 15.16527°E

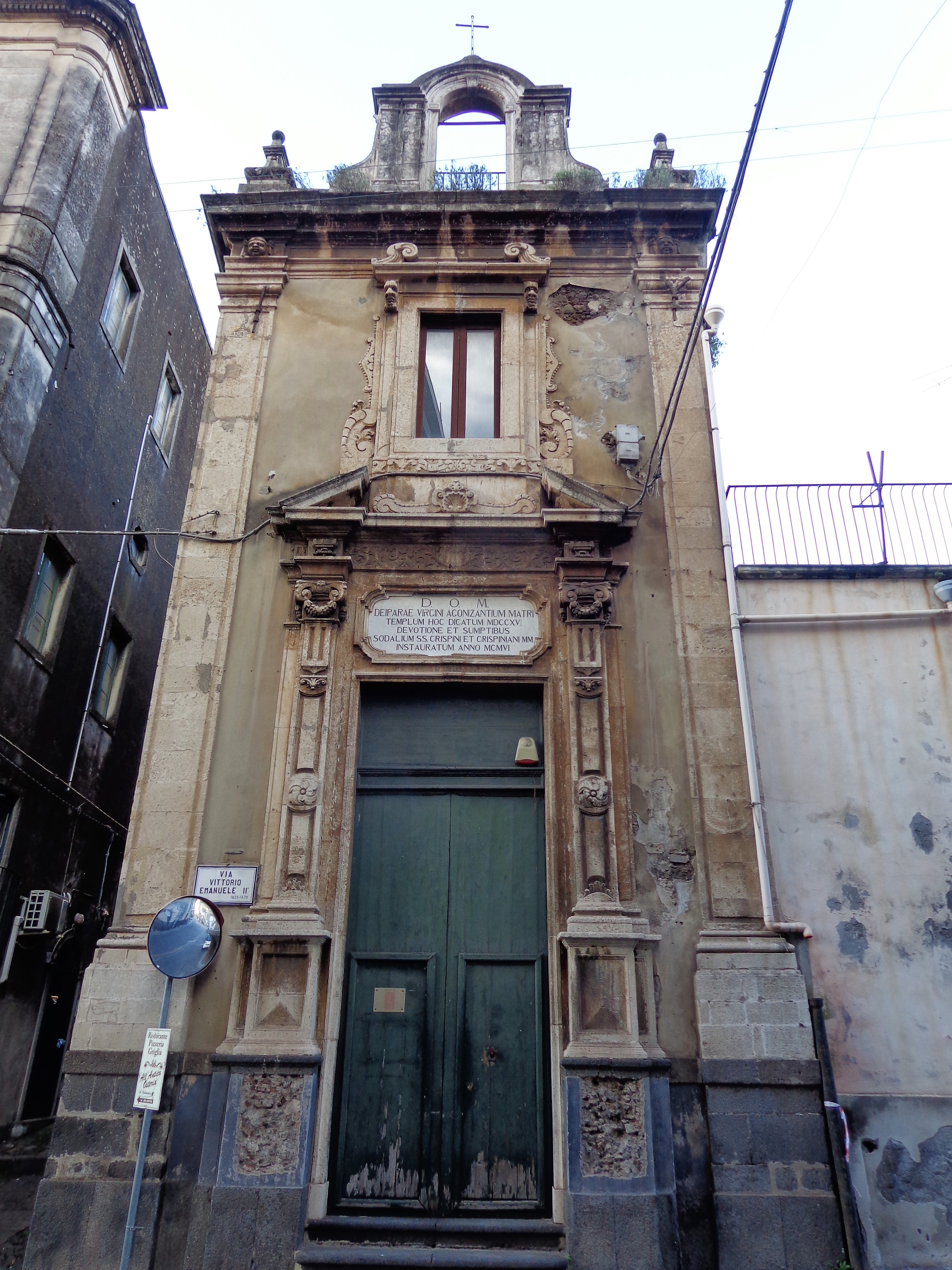
facade

Santa Maria degli Agonizzanti, later called San Crispino is a small, now deconsecrated Baroque, Roman Catholic church or chapel located on Via Vittorio Emanuele II, corner with Via Pennisi, in Acireale in the region of Sicily, Italy.

This small church was originally linked to a confraternity that tended to the final communion and burial of prisoners condemned to death. Originally built in the early 18th-century, the plaque above the portal harkens to a reconstruction in 1905. The church putatively contained a prison cell where the captive was kept till execution. The death penalty was abolished in the Kingdom of Italy was abolished in 1889 until 1929. The church is no longer in use.
