= Acireale =

Acireale Jaciriali (Sicilian) Ákis (Greek)
- Comune
- Città di Acireale
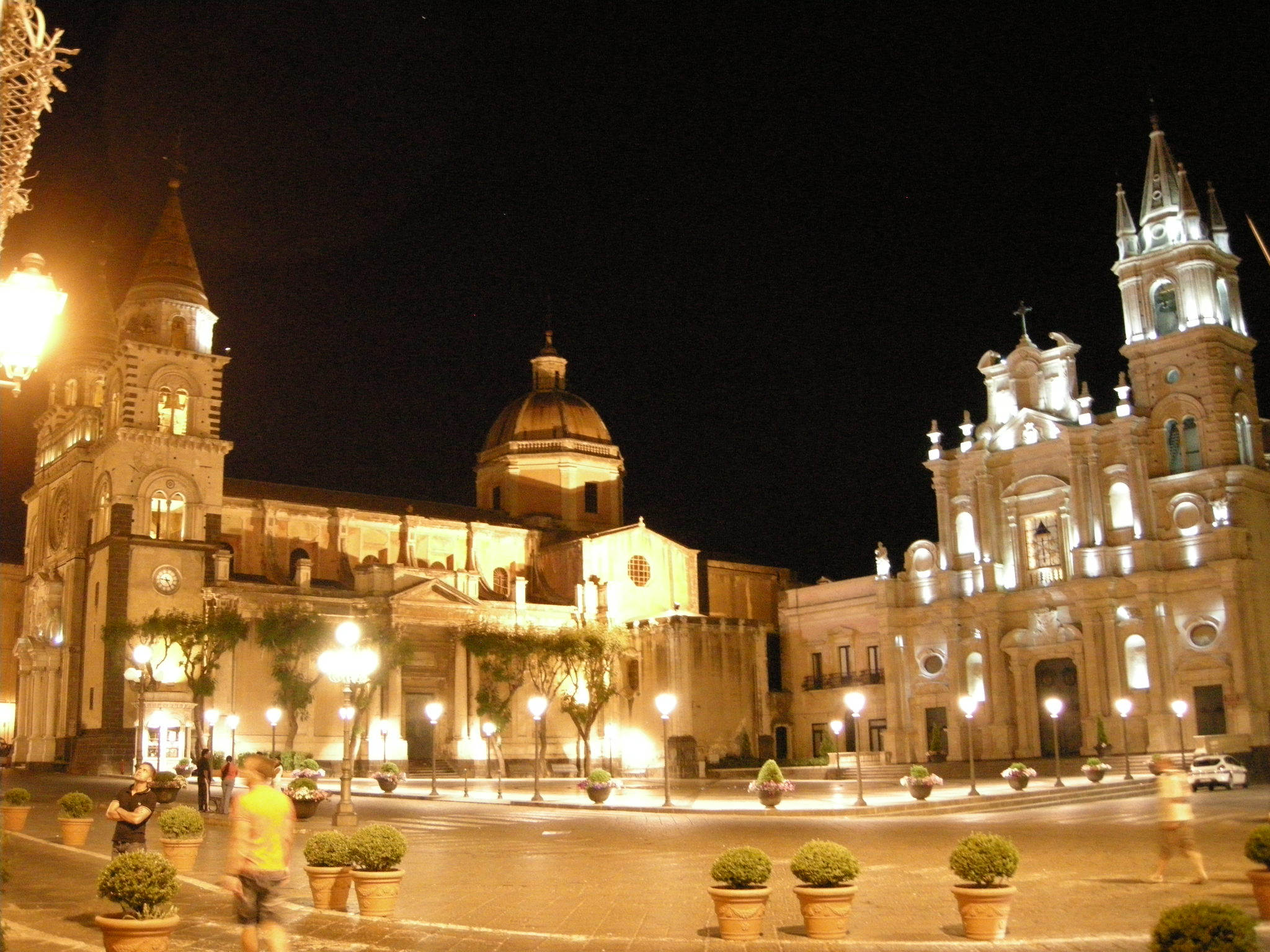
- Piazza del Duomo

- Flag Coat of arms

- Location within Italy Location within Sicily
- Coordinates: 37°37′N 15°10′E
- Country: Italy
- Region: Sicily
- Metropolitan city: Catania (CT)
- Frazioni: Aci Platani, Balatelle, Capo Mulini, Fiandaca, Guardia, Mangano, Pennisi, Piano d'Api, Pozzillo, San Cosmo, San Giovanni Bosco, Santa Caterina, Santa Maria degli Ammalati, Santa Maria delle Grazie, Santa Maria la Scala, Santa Maria la Stella, Santa Tecla, Scillichenti, Stazzo

Government
  - Mayor: Roberto Barbagallo (Civic List)

Area
  - Total: 40.43 km^{2} (15.61 sq mi)
- Elevation: 102 m (335 ft)

Population (2026)
  - Total: 50,528
  - Density: 1,250/km^{2} (3,237/sq mi)
- Demonym: Acesi
- Time zone: UTC+1 (CET)
  - Summer (DST): UTC+2 (CEST)
- Postal code: 95024
- Dialing code: 095
- Patron saint: St. Venera and St. Sebastian
- Saint day: 26 July and 20 January
- Website: Official website

Acireale (Italian: [ˌatʃireˈaːle]; Sicilian: Jaciriali, locally shortened to Jaci or Aci) is a coastal city and municipality in the north-east of the Metropolitan City of Catania in the autonomous island region of Sicily in Italy, at the foot of Mount Etna, on the coast facing the Ionian Sea. With a population of 50,528, it is the second-largest city in the metropolitan city.

It is home to numerous churches, including the Neo-Gothic St. Pietro's Basilica, St. Sebastiano's Basilica in the Sicilian Baroque style, and the 17th century Acireale Cathedral, and a seminary, for the training of priests. Acireale is also noted for its art and paintings: the oldest academy in Sicily, the Accademia di scienze, lettere e belle arti degli Zelanti e dei Dafnici, is located here.

== History ==
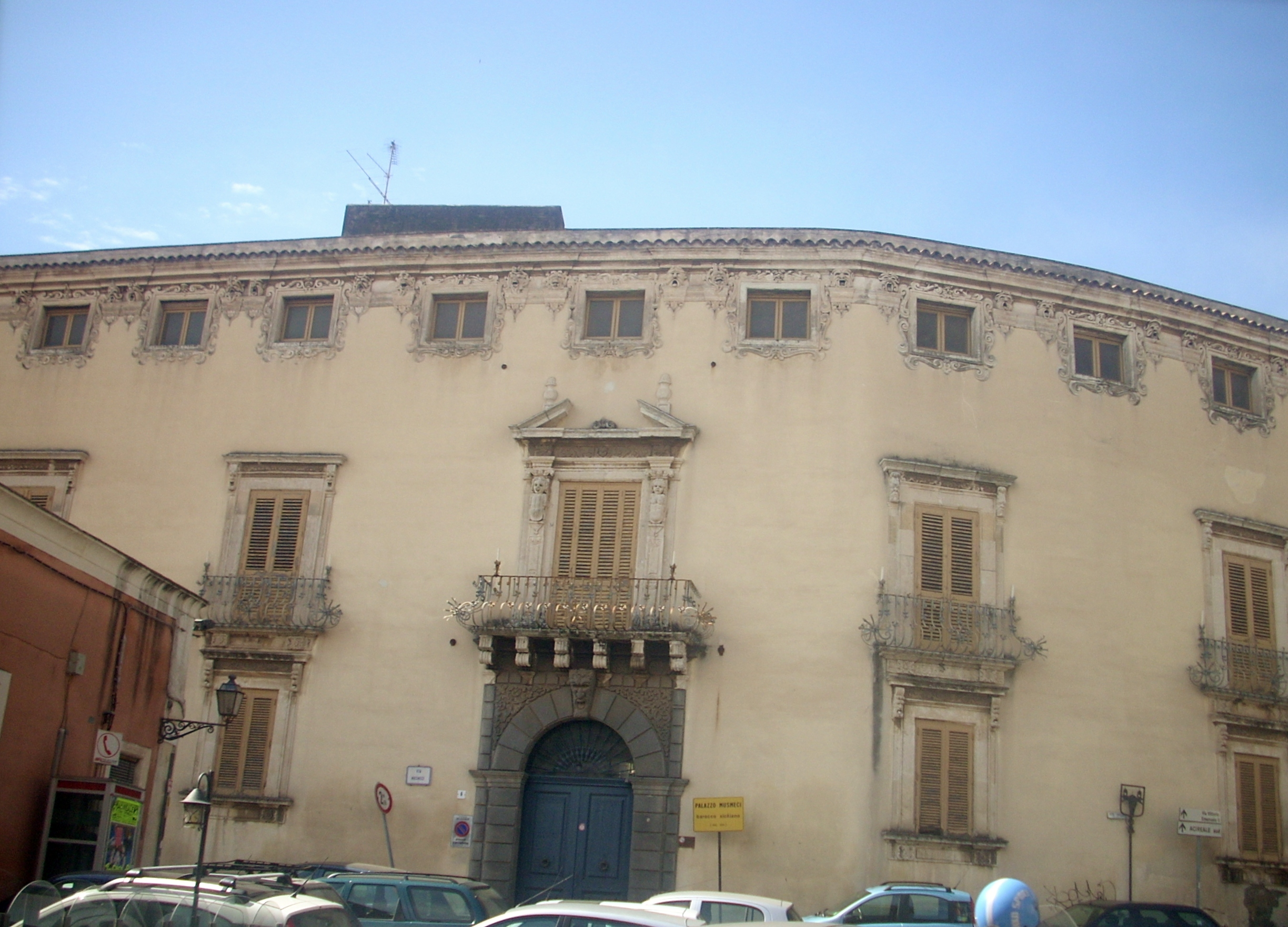
18th-century Musmeci Palazzo, located in Piazza San Domenico.

According to tradition, the city's origins trace back to Xiphonia, a mysterious Greek city whose location is unknown. In Roman times, there existed another Greek town, Akis, which was involved in the Punic Wars. In Ovid's Metamorphoses, there is a great love between Ā́cis, the spirit of the Ā́cis River, and Galatea the sea-nymph. According to mythology, the tears of Galatea after the death of Ā́cis gave birth to the Ā́cis River, Fiume di Jaci, flowing past Acireale (the ancient Akis or Acium). The Romans called the town Acium, and it was on the main road from Catana to Tauromenium. The Romans used the thermal springs located here.

In the Middle Ages, the town expanded around the castle (now part of Aci Castello), known as Jachium under the Byzantines, as Al-Yāj (الياج) under the Arabs, and, later, as Aquilia. The potent 1169 Sicily earthquake scattered the population of the city farther into the mainland, divided between the numerous boroughs of Aci. Another town, Aquilia Nova ("New Aquilia"), was founded in the late 14th century further north, creating the nucleus of what is now Acireale. The only extant architectural remnant of this medieval town is Gothic-Lombard-style portal of the church of Sant'Antonio di Padova.

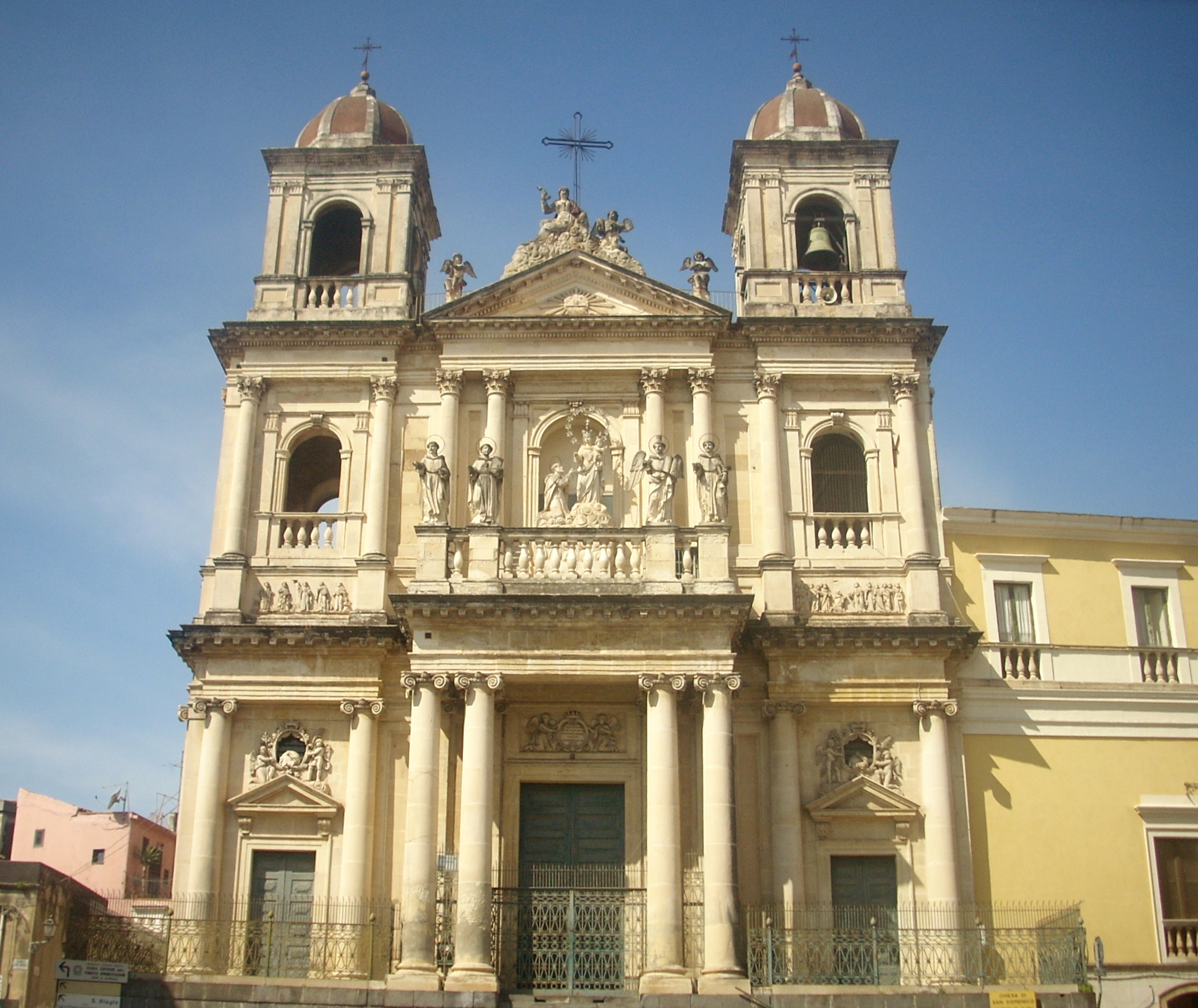
Church of San Domenico. After the 1693 Sicily earthquake, the original 16th-century church was refurbished in the 18th century in neoclassical style

In the 16th century, Emperor Charles V freed the city from feudal ties, creating it as a Crown commune. In the late 16th century, the town had between 6,000 and 7,000 inhabitants. The most ancient document mentioning the Carnival of Acireale dates to 1594. The town expanded its role as a trade center (it was granted the right to hold a Free Market or Fiera Franca) and received numerous new edifices.

Acireale was nearly destroyed by the massive 1693 Sicily earthquake, which substantially halted its economic growth, and required near-complete reconstruction of all the buildings. During the Expedition of the Thousand in 1861, led by Garibaldi and which liberated Sicily from the rule of the Bourbon Kingdom of Napoli, Acireale was the first town to rebel against the Neapolitan rule. In 1941, the town was bombed by the Allies, resulting in many civilian casualties.

== Demographics ==
As of 2026, the population is 50,528, of which 48.8% are males, and 51.2% are females. Minors make up 15.0% of the population, and seniors make up 24.3%.

Historical population

Year	Pop.	±%
1861	30,785	—
1871	32,042	+4.1%
1881	35,321	+10.2%
1901	31,495	−10.8%
1911	31,975	+1.5%
1921	31,372	−1.9%
1931	34,332	+9.4%
1936	36,871	+7.4%

Year	Pop.	±%
1951	39,439	+7.0%
1961	43,752	+10.9%
1971	47,122	+7.7%
1981	48,493	+2.9%
1991	46,199	−4.7%
2001	50,190	+8.6%
2011	51,456	+2.5%
2021	50,735	−1.4%

Source: ISTAT

=== Immigration ===
As of 2025, immigrants make up 4.5% of the population. The 5 largest foreign countries of birth are Romania, Albania, Germany, Sri Lanka, and Morocco.

== Main Sights ==
=== Secular Sites and Buildings ===
- Villa Belvedere and Parco delle Terme, two large public parks and "La Timpa", a natural reserve overlooking the Ionian Sea, offer great nature sights.
- Piazza Duomo, with the twin churches of the Acireale Cathedral and Santi Pietro e Paolo, is in the main square of the city.
- Palazzo della Città, Acireale
- Palazzo Pennisi
- Palazzo Modò, which dates from the 17th century
- Palazzo Musmeci dating from the 18th century.
- Commercial city center is primarily located in the streets including and adjacent to Corso Umberto and Corso Italia, which are the city's principal thoroughfares.
- Fortezza del Tocco, a 16th-century fort, has been converted to a nature reserve.

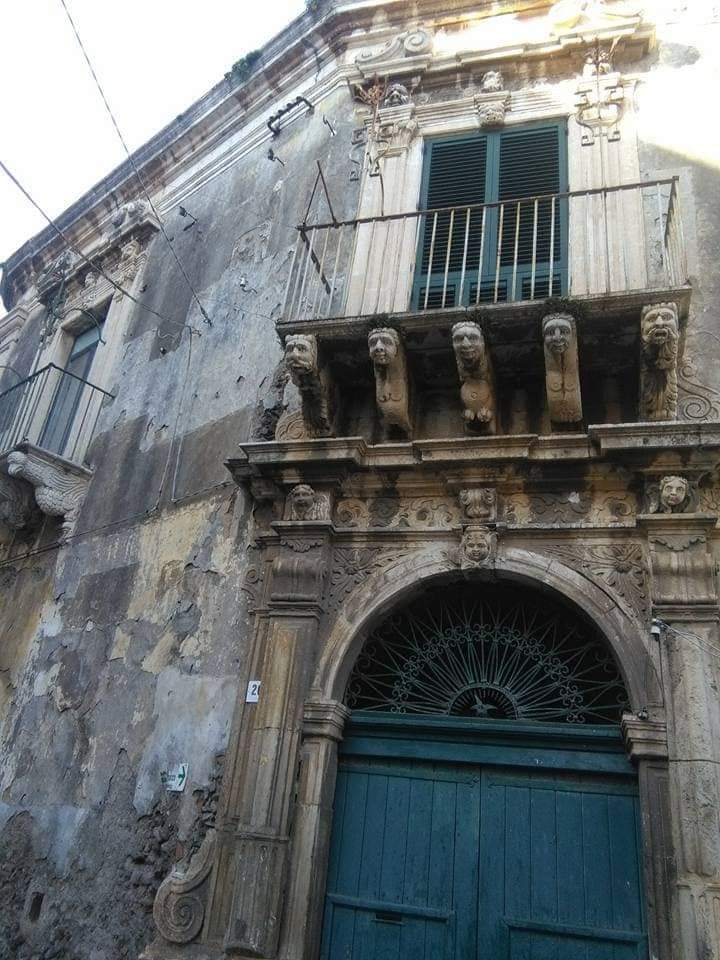
Old noble palazzo located in Via San Carlo featuring the characteristic balconies and portals with the grotesque masks made of lava rock

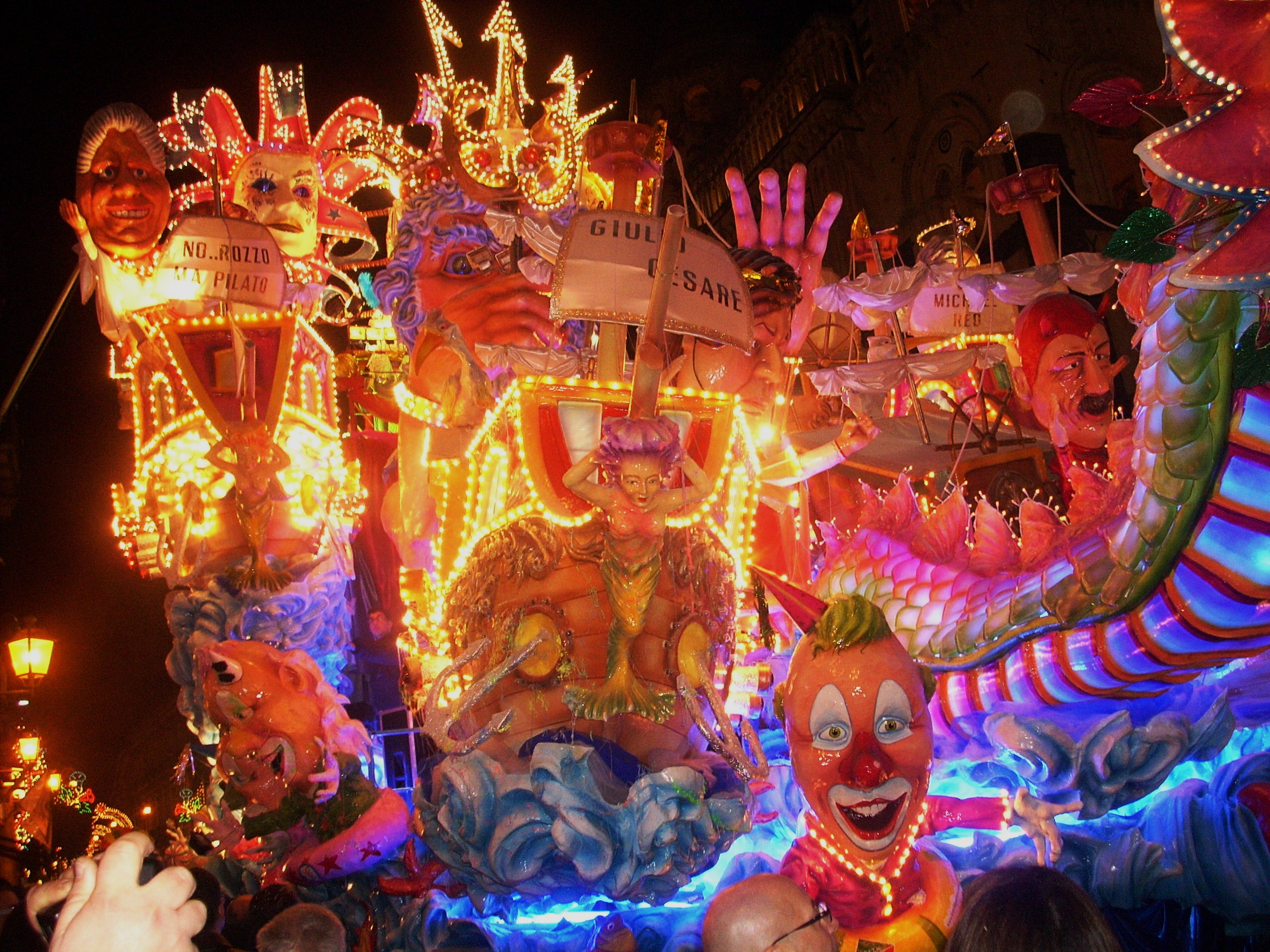
Floats during the carnival season.

- Zelantea Library (Biblioteca) and Art Gallery (Pinacoteca Zelantea): originate from collections and a society of scholars begun in the seventeenth century. Both are housed in a neoclassical palace built in the nineteenth century by the engineer Mariano Panebianco, which holds some collections of art and ancient texts.
- Museum of peasant traditions of Aci Platani: houses a reconstruction of a typical house of an Etnean peasant family of the nineteenth century.
- Uniform Museum: housed in the Palazzo del Comune in Piazza Duomo, holds a collection of historical uniforms from the end of the eighteenth century.
- Museum of the Opera dei Pupi in Via Alessi.
- Carnival Museum: located inside the Palazzo del Turismo in via Ruggero Settimo, 11.
- Floristella Monetary: numismatic collection of Agostino Pennisi of Floristella currently located at the Regional Archaeological Museum of Syracuse and is waiting for a location in the city.
- Teatro dell'Opera dei Pupi of Capomulini: concentrates in the exhibition spaces the important tradition of the Acesis puppeteers passed on for generations (and recognized, along with the other Sicilian puppeteer traditions, as intangible heritage of humanity by UNESCO).
- Diocesan Museum in via Genuardi.

=== Religious sites ===
- Cathedral of S. Maria Annunziata
- Sant'Antonio di Padova
- San Biagio
- San Camillo
- San Domenico
- Santa Maria degli Agonizzanti
- Santa Maria del Suffragio
- Church of the Oratory
- Basilica of Santi Pietro e Paolo
- Collegiate Basilica of San Sebastiano

== Culture ==
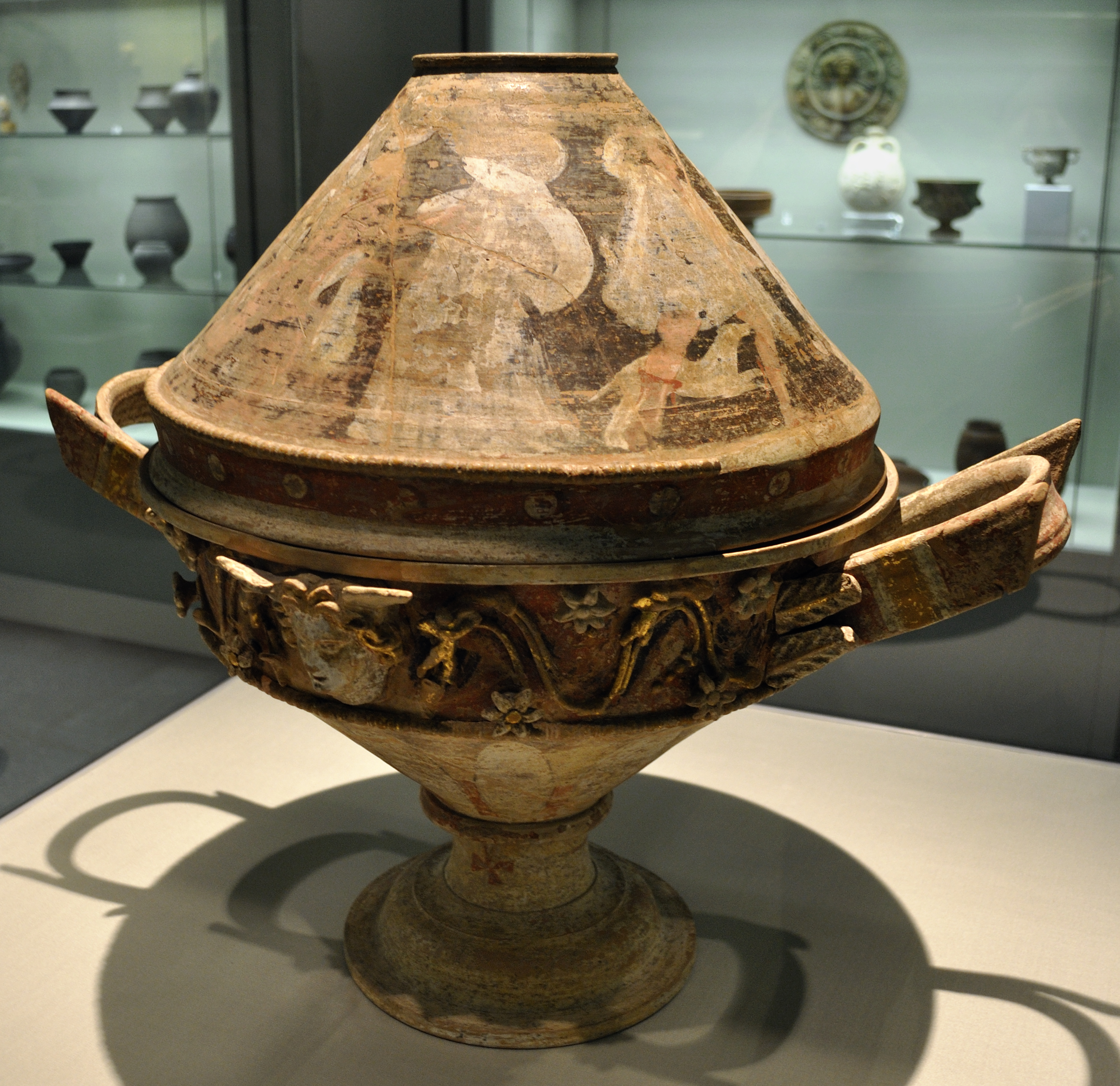
Centuripe Ware Lekanis, Hetjens-Museum, Düsseldorf

=== Myths and legends ===
In Acireale history is often accompanied by legend, especially in the myth of its foundation. Among the legends Acis and Galatea, the adventure of Odysseus against the cyclops Polyphemus, a forest born from the revenge of Zeus against the giants, and a legend related to the flight of the Carthaginian army before a lava flow of the Mount Etna.

The paronymal legend, from which the name of the city and of the hamlets would originate, was the idyll of love between Acis and Galatea, and is introduced by Ovid in the Metamorphoses, by Theocritus, by Virgil, by Posidippus, by Philoxenus, by Callimachus, by Hermenenattes and by Euphorion.

The beautiful nymph Galatea was in love with the shepherd Acis. Their love was thwarted by Polyphemus, a terrible cyclops who, enraged by jealousy, threw a stone at the shepherd boy, causing his death. The nymph, desperate for the loss of Acis, begged the gods to bring him back to life and they, accepting her prayers, transformed the shepherd into an eternal river, called Jaci (Akis). The river Jaci, which has an unknown underground path and is part of the rich Etnean drainage system, flows both in the locality Acque grandi ("acquaranni") between Acireale and Capomulini, under a massive lava bank, and in the village of Santa Maria la Scala (Testa di l'acqua), at the "Molino di Miuccio", with crystal clear and freezing water, as well as north of the district of Santa Caterina (Acqu'e ferru) where it has a characteristic reddish effect, caused by the presence of Iron oxides, that in the popular belief, based on the Ovidian verses, is attributed to the blood of Acis ("u sangu di Jaci", in Sicilian)

In the Villa Belvedere is exhibited a sculptural group of Acis and Galatea, a marble copy made on the pantograph on the model in patinated plaster displayed at the Zelantea Library, the work of Rosario Anastasi of 1846, which represents the epilogue of the myth, the last act, when Galatea, with her dramatic invocation to the gods, wants to resurrect her beloved Acis killed by a stone thrown by Polyphemus.

=== Cuisine ===
The granita, an excellent refreshment from the summer mugginess, in Acireale is considered almost a ritual. Probably born from the tradition of the «nevaroli» who transported the snow from the Etna up to the seashore when the refrigerator did not yet exist, in the city the invention of the granita is attributed to the ingenious Francesco Procopio dei Coltelli from Acitrezza that, with the café «le Procope», had much success in 17th-century Paris.

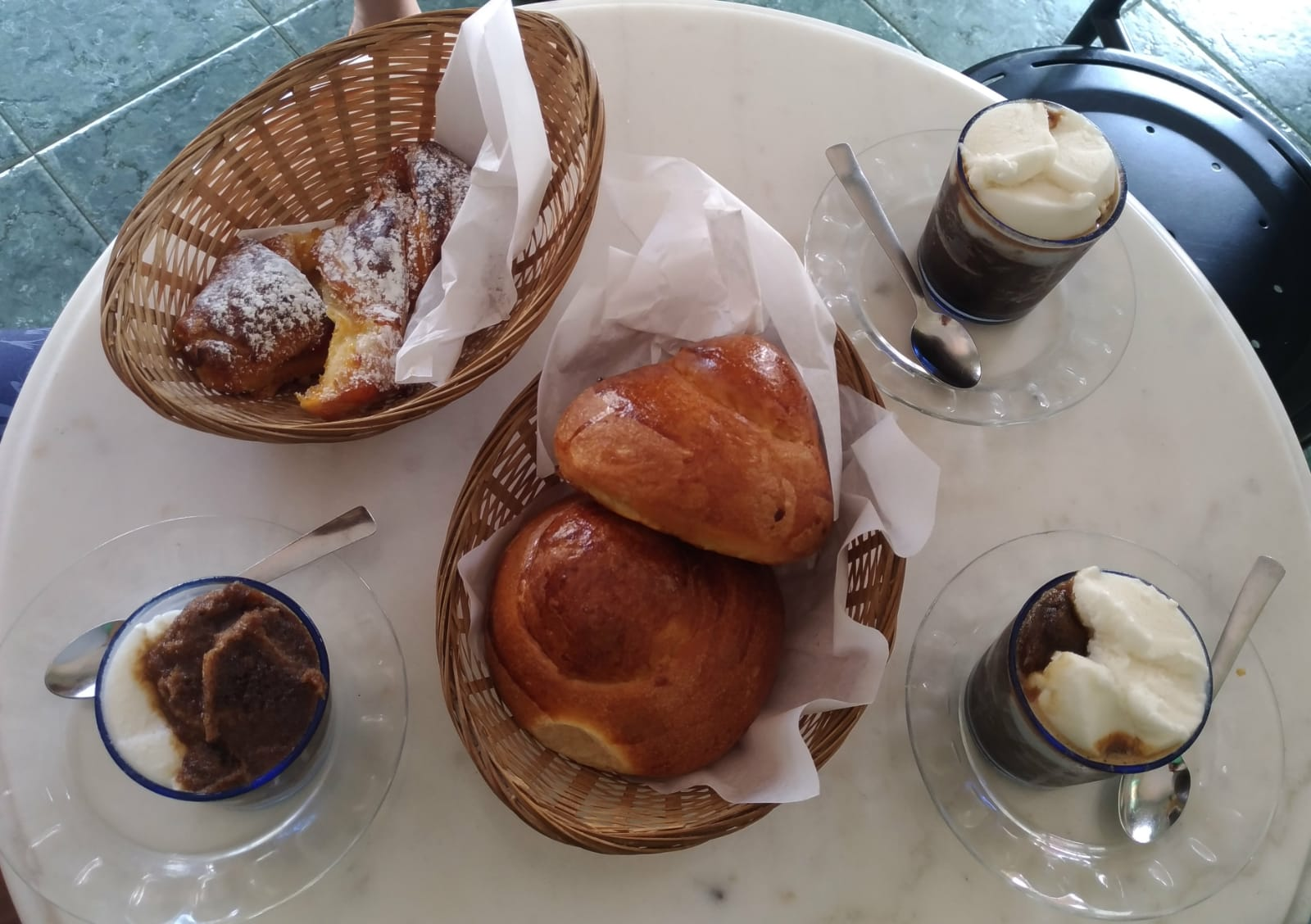
Coffee-almond flavored granita, served with a Sicilian brioche and a cornetto.

Generally, it is served in its basic almond flavored recipe and accompanied by a brioche. Lemon granita is also very common. Another typical food of the Acesis summer is seltzer with lemon and salt, sold at the numerous kiosks that are found in the streets of the city.

In addition, the pastries are renowned, in which the zeppole of rice with honey (also called crispelle di San Giuseppe in other municipalities), the cannoli filled with chocolate cream, white cream or ricotta, small pastry products and artisan gelato are its crowned jewels and the diners with fresh baked goods (arancini, "cartocciate", "cipolline" etc.) as well as sweet breakfast products (croissants, panzerotti, "raviole" filled with ricotta cheese, "iris" filled with chocolate cream or white cream). In the fishing villages there are many restaurants that offer menus based only on fresh fish.

Acireale, along with its district, is also known for the Etna Lemon, which in October 2020 obtained the prestigious recognition I.G.P. by the European Union.

=== Events ===
Acireale houses costumes and floats parades during the carnival season.

== Education ==
The city had grown in the second half of the 19th century as a "City of Studies" because there was a heritage of several boarding schools and institutions of higher education that today can be considered lost in the absence of a university campus. In Acireale there are several Secondary schools, public and private, divided between high schools, technical and professional institutes, which are also largely frequented by students from neighboring municipalities.

== International relations ==
=== Twin towns – sister cities ===
Acireale is twinned with:

- Mar del Plata, Argentina
- Viareggio, Italy
- Nantes, France
