= Villa Cerami, Catania =

Building in Catania, Italy

Coordinates: 37°30′23.4″N 15°5′05.5″E

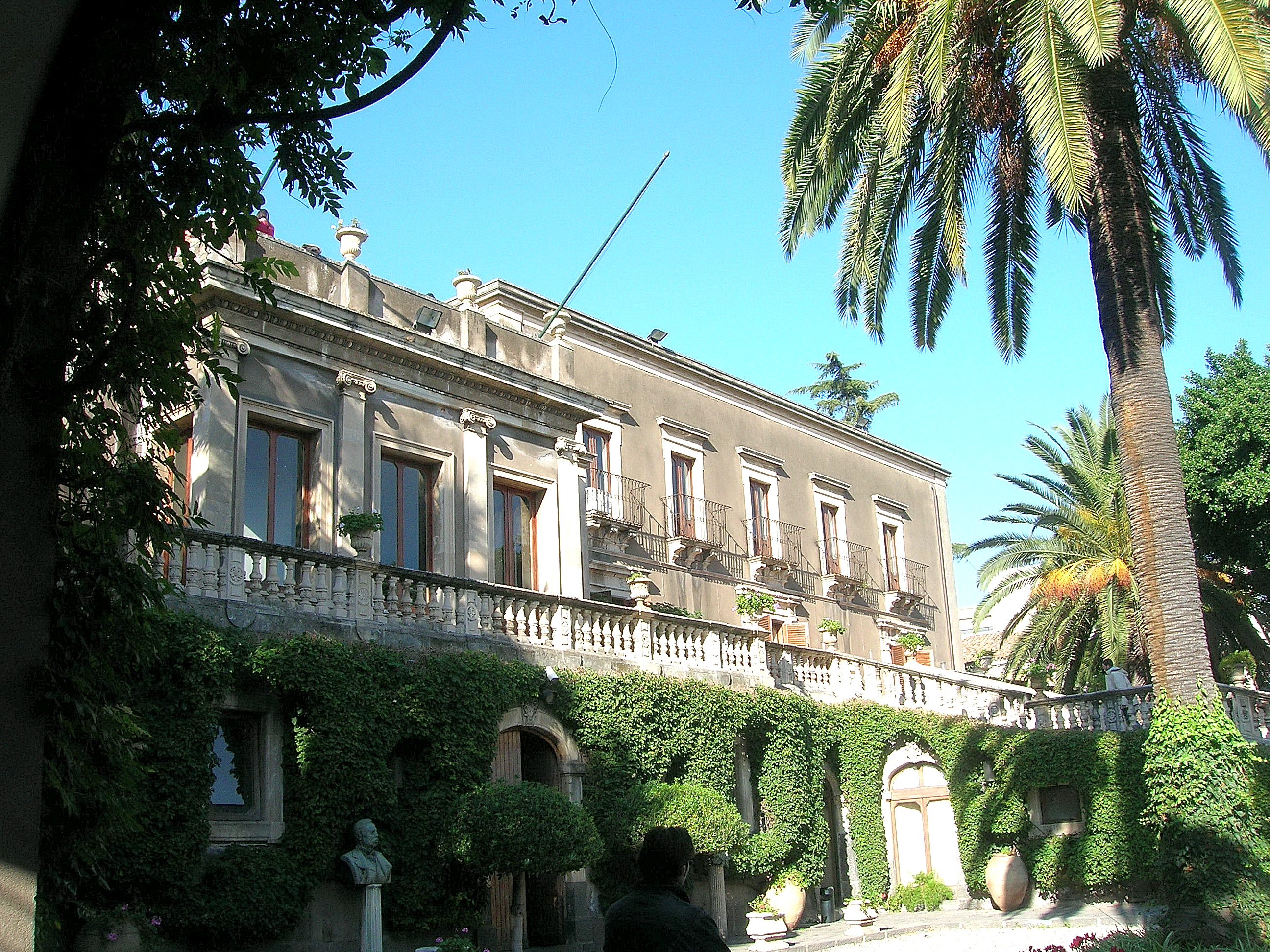
Facade of the villa

The Villa Cerami was once a semirural villa, located at the edge of the urban center and with a sizable surrounding garden, located at the Northern end of via Crocifero (#91), in the city of Catania, Sicily, southern Italy. Once a private home, it now houses the offices of the School of Jurisprudence (Law) of the University of Catania. It is located on a rise above the city, the villa was built atop the ruins of part of the Roman amphitheater of which some ruins are visible in nearby Piazza Stesicoro. Adjacent or nearby are three Sant'Agata churches: la Vetere, al Carcere, and alla Fornace. The route down via Crocifero passes four major Baroque churches and convents.

== History and description ==
A palace at the site first belonged to Giuseppe Lanza, duca di Camastra, who sold it to the duca di San Donato, who then sold it circa 1724 to Domenico Rosso, 3rd Prince di Cerami. Due to the devastation of the 1693 earthquake, the villa we see likely dates mainly to the reconstruction pursued by the architect Giovanni Battista Vaccarini. Vaccarini also likely designed the entrance portico and the monumental entrance staircase. The son of Domenico Rosso, 4th prince of Cerami, took possession of the house from 1735 to 1768; he was a close friend of the Catanian polymath and antiquarian, Ignazio Paternò Castello, prince of Biscari. It is recorded in a history of Catania, that Domenico gave food to many families and orphans during the famine of 1763.

The building was refurbished in the second half of the 19th century by Carlo Sada, commissioned by the 9th prince of Cerami. One impetus of the refurbishment was to host in January 1881, the king Umberto and the queen Margherita. For the event a frescoed altarpiece depicting the Assumption of the Madonna by Olivio Sozzi was plastered over and painted with a more festive fresco, a copy of Guido Reni's Roman masterpiece of Aurora. The villa passed on the comune of Catania and became a school, with the facility falling into decay, and losing most of the mobile artwork. A 14th-century oil painting depicting the Martyrdom of St Agatha attributed to Giovanni da San Giovanni is now in the city hall.

In 1957, the villa was acquired by the Università di Catania. This was followed by some restoration of the villa garden, and conversion of the large ball-room into the aula magna (large classroom) for the faculty of Jurisprudence. However, from 1962 to 1964, to create offices for the faculty, classrooms, and a library, a modern 5 story glass tower was built in the northwest portion of the property in what had been part of the gardens.

The Baroque portico, rich with sculptural decoration and the Cerami coat of arms, leads to a forecourt where the scuderia (former carriage-house) has been converted to classrooms. Outside of the portal, a formal marble water font was installed for the neighborhood by the Cerami family.
