= Palazzo della Borsa, Catania =

Coordinates: 37.50758°N 15.08476°E

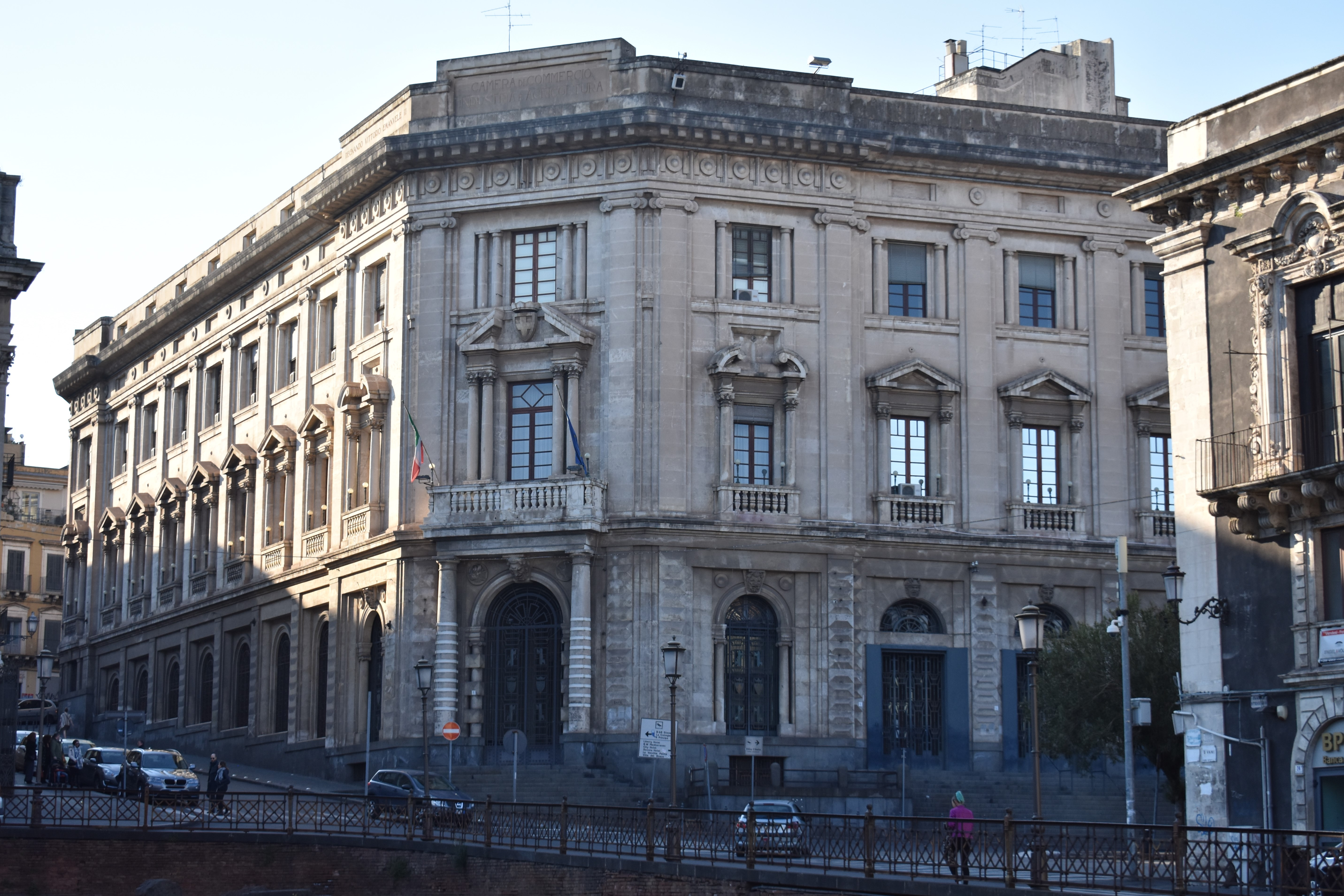
View of Palazzo della Borsa from Piazza Stesicoro

The Palazzo della Borsa is a prominent 20th-century building facing the northwest corner of Piazza Stesicoro, between Via Sant'Euplio and Via Cappuccini, across the street from Sant'Agata alle Fornace in the city centre of Catania, region of Sicily, Italy.

== History and description ==
While many of the elements of the structure recall late 18th-century Neoclassical architecture in Catania, construction of this building began in 1928 and was completed in 1933 with designs by Vincenzo Patanè. He also designed the Palazzo delle Scienze in Catania. It previously housed the monastery of the Capuchin order (Capuccini) and their church. The order was suppressed in 1866, and the convent was used as a barracks, but it and the church were abandoned. The church suffered from a fire, and the structures here were razed in 1927. The hill was partially modified to allow the construction of the building.

The three-storey building has an elegant stone portico with a keystone grotesque, and the heraldic symbol of the Savoyard monarchy atop the portal. Originally built as the bourse, it now houses the Camera di Commercio Sud Est Sicilia (Chamber of Commerce of South-East Sicily). One aspect that dates the structure to the fascist era is the presence of fasces in the metal grills that front the main corner entrance.
