= Palazzo Tezzano =

Coordinates: 37°30′28.7″N 15°5′08″E

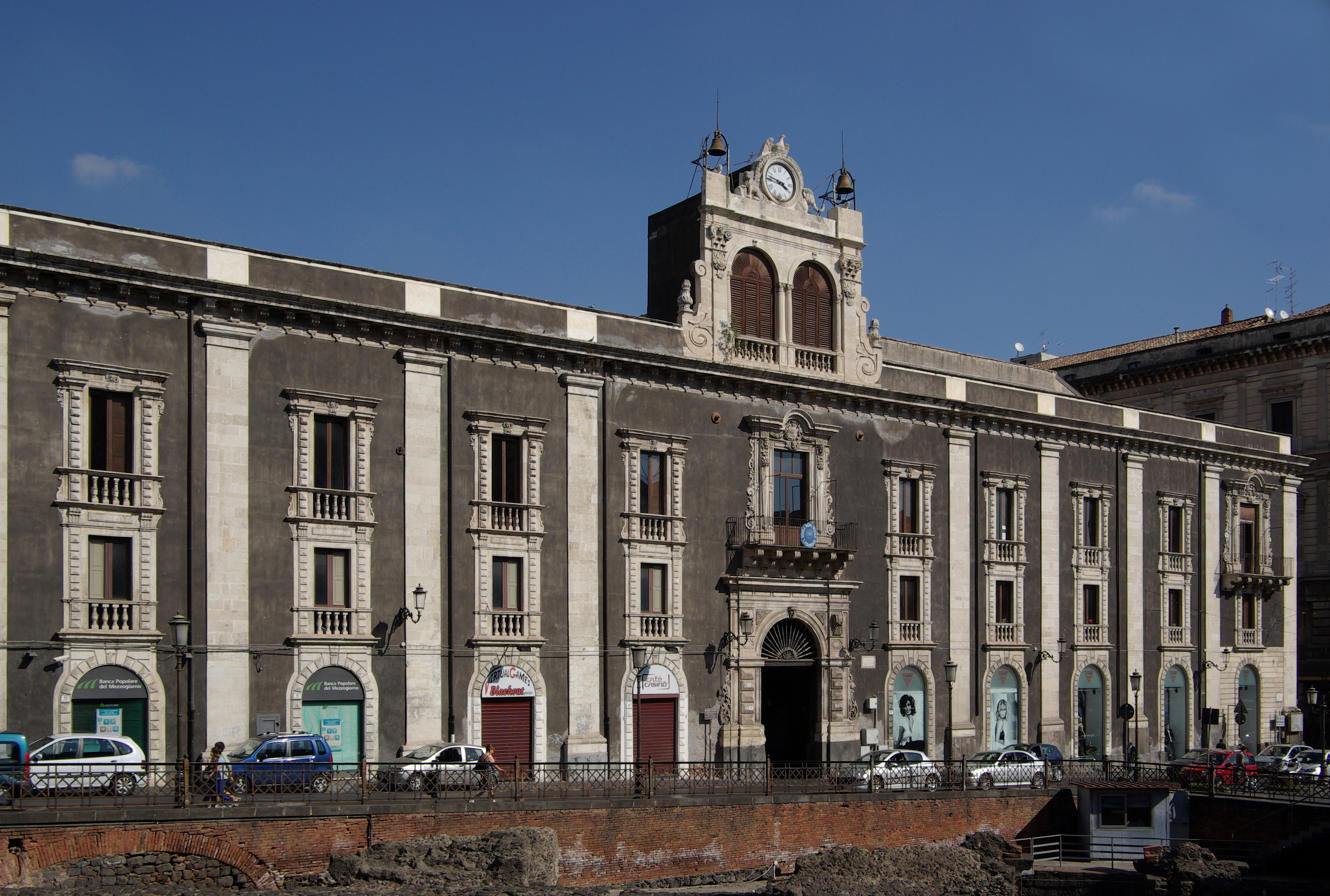
Tezzano Palace

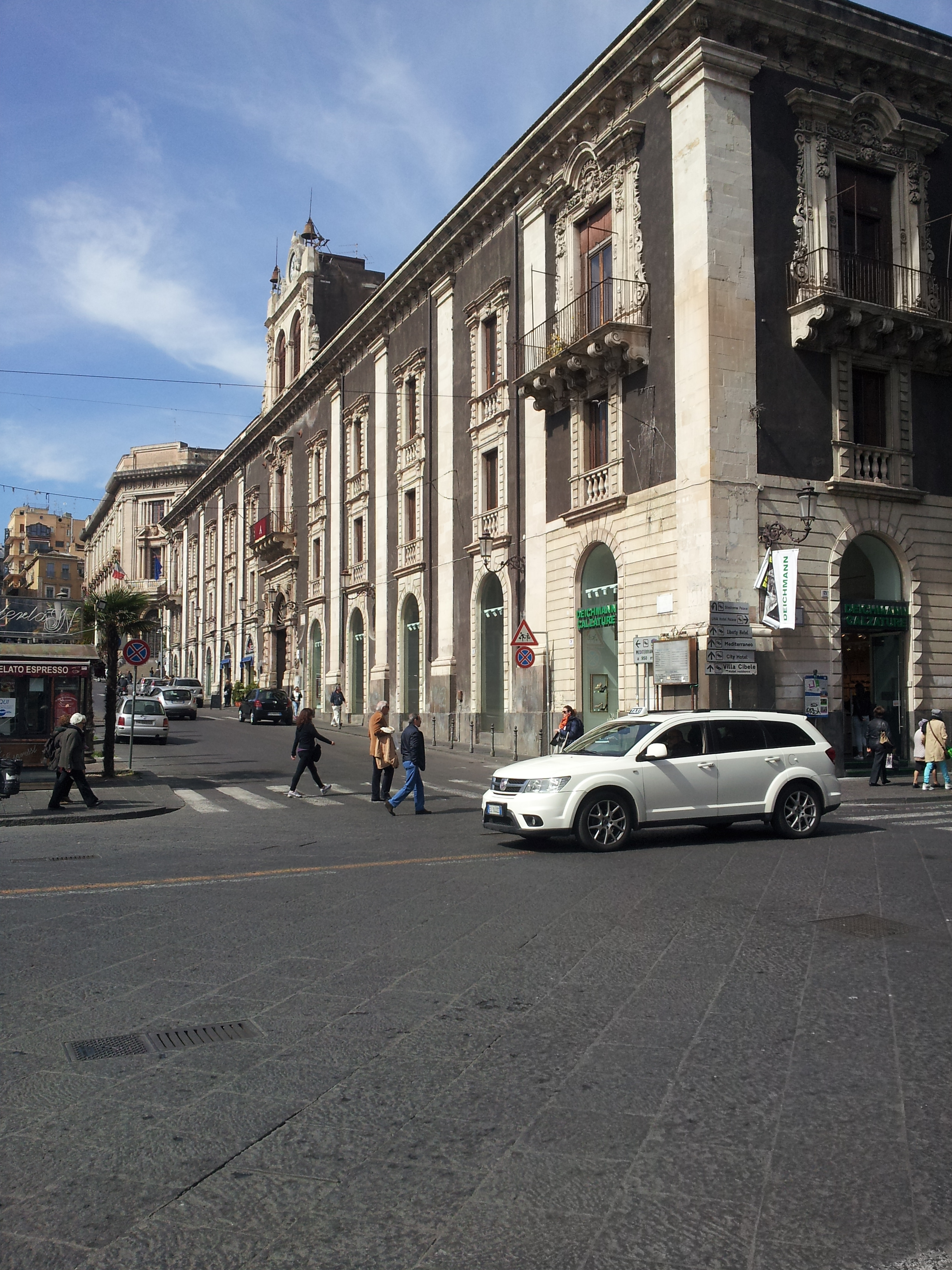
Tezzano Palace, the eastern view

The Palazzo Tezzano is a monumental palace in Piazza Stesicoro, in the center of Catania, Sicily, southern Italy. The via Etnea, with prominent shops, bisects the Piazza; this palazzo rises at the northwest intersection with this via, across from the white stone, neoclassical Palazzo Paterno del Toscano.

== History ==
The construction of Palazzo Tezzano started in 1709 on land owned by the count and physician Nicholas Tezzano. It was later donated to the city of Catania. It was transformed into a hospital by Alonzo Di Benedetto between 1720 and 1727.

In 1837, partly because of the hospital's economic difficulties, part of the building was leased by the House of Bourbon to house its archives. Some years later, around 1844, the palace were also added some of the Attorney General's office and local seats of the criminal chancellery. In those years, plans were made for the relocation and transformation of the entire hospital and the building of a general court. Those projects were stranded following the Revolution of 1848. The transfer of the hospital took some time between 1878 and 1880. It was moved to premises adjacent to the former Benedictine Monastery of San Nicolò l'Arena, and changed its name to "Vittorio Emanuele II Hospital".

The palace also housed two prominent Cafe and drink establishments during the early to mid 20th-century: La Birraria Svizzera and the Gran Caffè Lorenti. The latter closed by 1950 after suffering damage during World War II bombardments.

After the transfer of the hospital, Palazzo Tezzano remained the seat of the Court until 1953, when the new courthouse in Piazza Giovanni Verga Square was inaugurated.

== Architecture ==
The three-story, late-Baroque-style palace is notable for the contrast between the white stone windows with balustrades and monumental pilasters, and in between plain dark volcanic basalt plaster. The portal at the main entrance facing the piazza is decorated with a nearly mannerist excess of frames, volutes, brackets, and a keystone arch with a sculpted face. Superimposed is a balcony and above clock tower. The façade is symmetrical with five architectural units per side. The palace overlooks the ruins of the Ancient Roman amphitheater and a block from the church of San Biagio at the western end of the piazza.
