= Musumeci =

Musumeci (Italian: [muzuˈmɛːtʃi], Sicilian: [mʊsʊˈmɛːʃɪ]) is an Italian family name from southeastern Sicily, of uncertain Arabic origin. Notable people with the surname include:

- David Musumeci, Australian songwriter
- Maddalena Musumeci (born 1976), Italian water polo player
- Mikey Musumeci (born 1996), American submission grappler and jiu-jitsu competitor
- Nello Musumeci (born 1955), Italian politician, former president of Sicily
- Nina Musumeci, American beauty queen
- Pietro Musumeci (born 1920), Italian general and military intelligence officer
- Tammi Musumeci (born 1994), American submission grappler and jiu-jitsu competitor
- Tuccio Musumeci (born 1934), Italian actor and comedian

== See also ==
- Garage Musumeci, Catania
