= Enrico Alvino =

Italian architect and urban designer

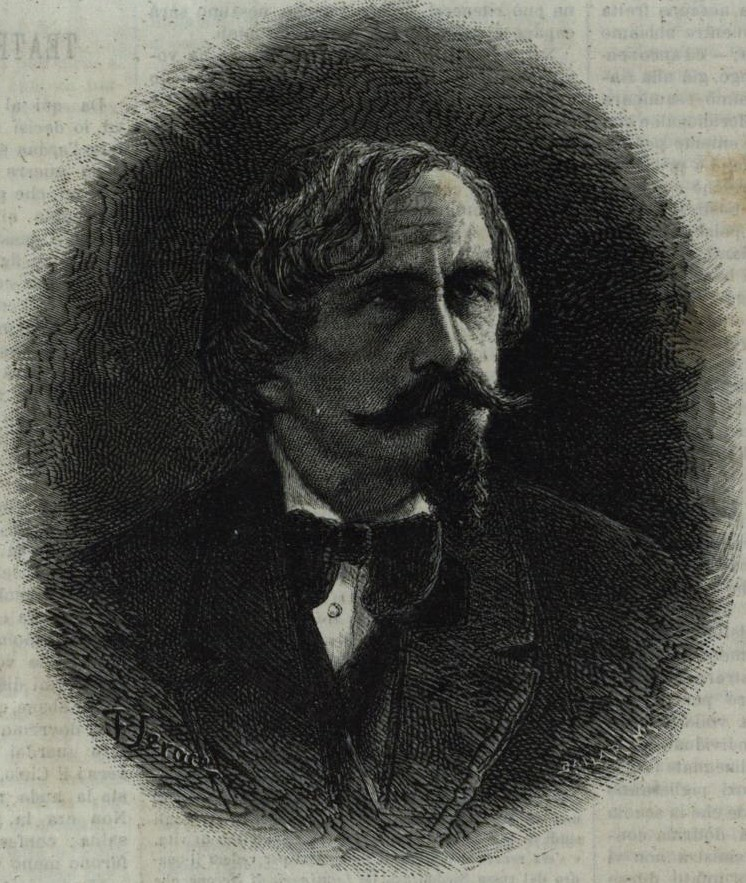
- Enrico Alvino
- Born: March 29, 1809; Milan, Kingdom of Italy
- Died: June 7, 1876 (aged 67); Rome, Kingdom of Italy
- Occupations: Architect; Urban planner
- Movement: Neoclassicism

Enrico Alvino (29 March 1809 – 7 June 1876) was an Italian architect and urban designer, particularly active in Naples in the mid-19th century. He was born in Milan, and died in Rome.

== Biography ==
Errico Alvino was born in Milan on 29 March 1809. He trained in Naples at the Accademia di Belle Arti di Napoli, where he later taught (from 1835 ) and became a professor of civic architecture (1859). In 1830 he went to Rome on a scholarship to study architecture and a few years later he was appointed municipal architect in Naples, where he worked for the rest of his life.

In his prolific and eclectic oeuvre he showed a broadly classicist tendency that ranged from Renaissance Revival to Neoclassical styles. His early work, such as the Palazzo Benucci (1843) at Castellammare di Stabia on the Gulf of Naples, recalled the High Renaissance. For his restoration (1853) of the church of Santa Maria di Piedigrotta, which King Ferdinand II wished to have decorated with mosaic in Byzantine style, Alvino chose to combine the Lombard-Romanesque and Renaissance styles, thus anticipating a tendency towards the mixing of forms from different historical styles that in the 1860s was manifested all over Europe.

In 1863 he began work on the conversion of the monastery of San Giovanni Battista into the Accademia di Belle Arti di Napoli. This building was a synthesis of Neapolitan Renaissance Revival elements. Its particular character lies in the coexistence of Renaissance taste and the new articulation of the building. The new centre of the institute is built around a large rectangular courtyard. The internal façade is the part that most reflects its previous monastic function, especially in the wide gallery surrounding the court. The three external façades are based on a single architectural module consisting of three orders of arched windows, one above the other, of which the middle order is the widest. Built in Campanian tufa, the ground floor is rusticated, and on the upper two floors are Tuscan and Corinthian pilasters.

Alongside his building works of this period Alvino also became a prolific urban planner during an economic revival in the reign of Ferdinand II, when numerous public works were carried out by the royal administration, including programmes for the expansion of the city of Naples. The idea was to connect the modern developments to the north-east and south-west with the historic city centre. From 1852 to 1860 he worked on the Corso Maria Teresa (now Corso Vittorio-Emanuele), a new street following a wide curve halfway up the southern slopes of the Vomero hill and connecting the two peripheral nuclei. Urban development on the hill began with the opening of the Corso, which favoured the expansion of the quarter to the west of Chiaia.

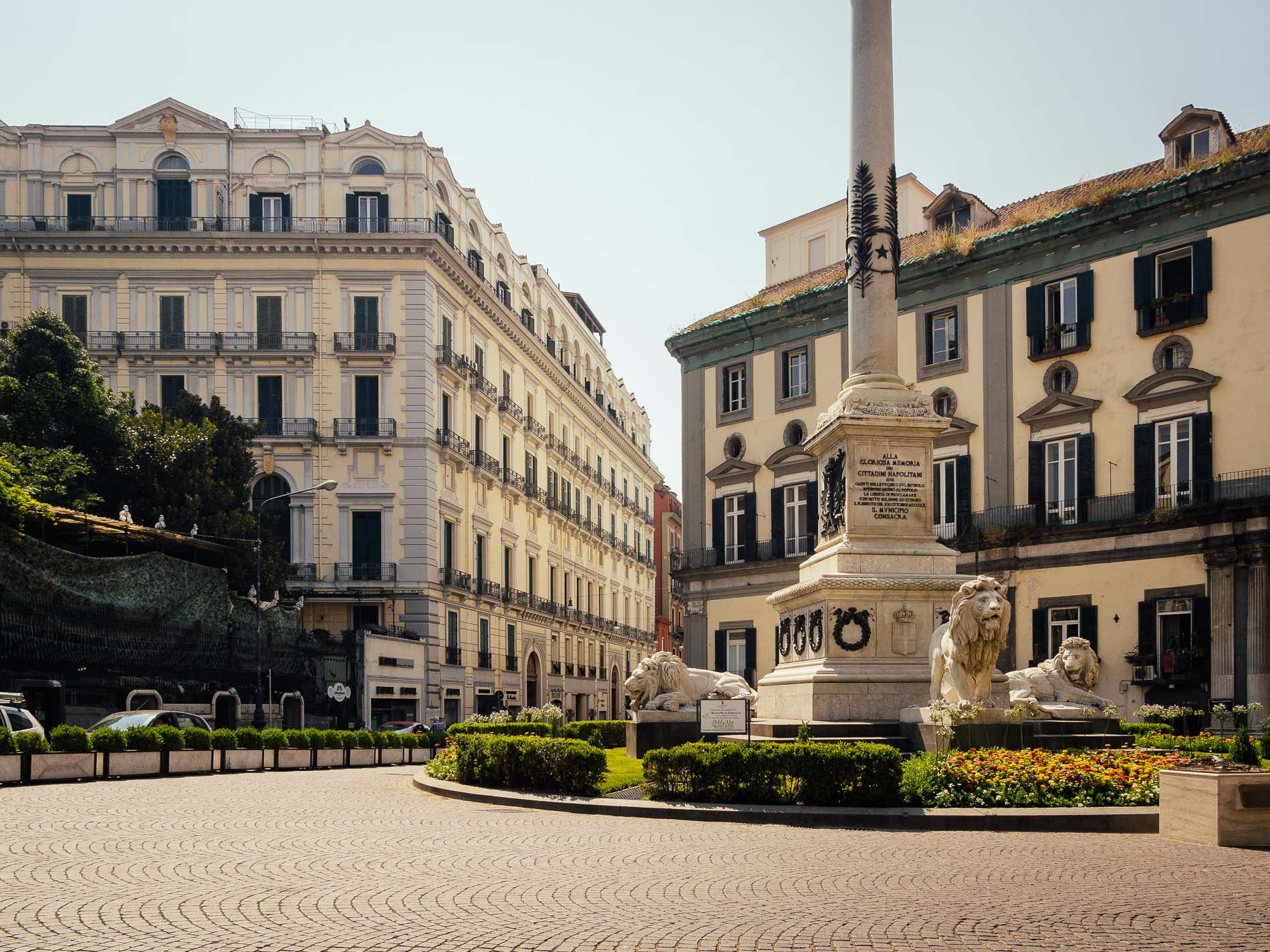
Palazzo Nunziante

In 1853, Alvino laid out and built the Via della Pace connecting the Chiaia quarter to the coastal zone of Santa Lucia and to San Fernando; he then constructed the royal cavalry barracks and the first tunnel under Mount Echia, which linked the Piazza Reale with Chiatamone, following a suggestion of Antonio Niccolini. In the same street, Alvino built the Palazzo Nunziante (1855), which was conceived on classical lines and occupies the whole block, representing the Neapolitan prototype of the modern middle-class residential building. From the 1860s Alvino was constantly involved in public works. In the Chiaia quarter he widened the beach as far as Chiatamone and restored the grotto of Posillipo, bringing a considerable expansion of the street network between Naples and the Flegrea area.

Alvino sat on the commission (1871–6) considering a long-term city plan, and he designed the Piazza Municipio (1871) and the nucleus of the Stazione Centrale (1875), later developed by Nicola Breglia. He still maintained an interest in the restoration of ancient buildings, among other commissions designing and building the new cathedral (1868) at Cerignola, near Foggia, in Tuscan style. He produced a competition entry for the façade of Florence Cathedral (unexecuted) and a Gothic Revival design for the façade of Naples Cathedral, the latter executed in a modified form (1877–1905) by Breglia and Giuseppe Pisanti (1826–1913). Together with Luigi Della Corte and Guglielmo Raimondi Alvino rebuilt the façade of Amalfi Cathedral, that had collapsed in 1861.

His last work, completed posthumously in 1877, was the Cassa Armonica in the Villa Comunale of Naples. Constructed of cast iron and glass, it shows Alvino's interest in new materials and construction techniques.

== Works ==
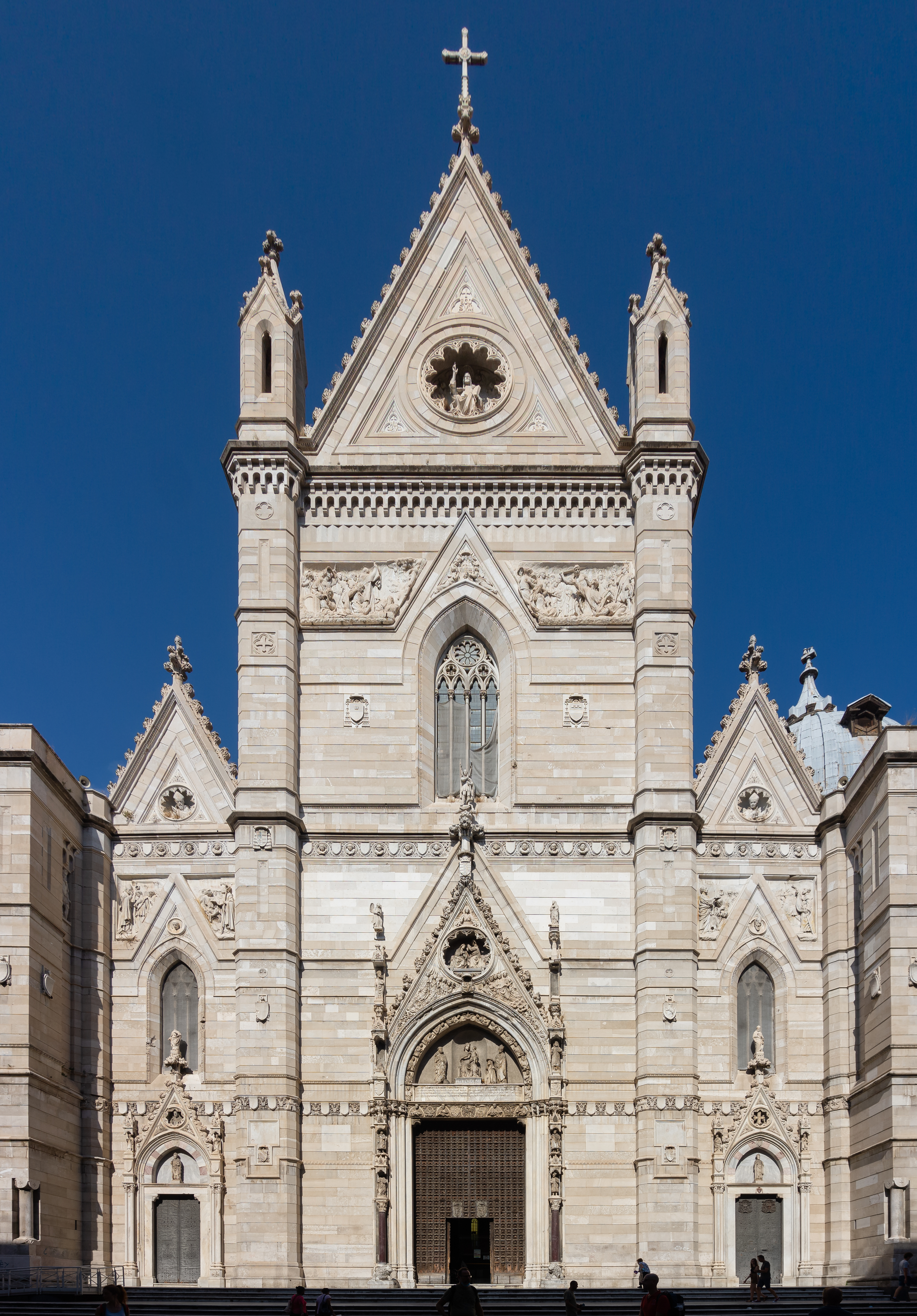
Façade of Naples Cathedral

Among his important works in Naples are:

- façade of the church of Santa Maria di Piedigrotta (1853);
- laid out (with others) the street, Corso Maria Teresa, today named Corso Vittorio Emanuele (between 1852 and 1860), finished in 1870;
- laid out and built the Via della Pace;
- planned the restoration of the façade of the Cathedral of Naples, completed in 1870;
- façade of Amalfi Cathedral;
- Palazzo Nunziante, Naples;
- redesigned the Santa Lucia quarter in 1862;
- Cerignola Cathedral;
- redesigned (with others) the Villa Comunale;
- converted the ancient convent of San Giovanni a Costantinopoli into the Royal Academy of Fine Arts;

In Catania, he helped complete the Palazzo Paternò del Toscano in Piazza Stesicoro.

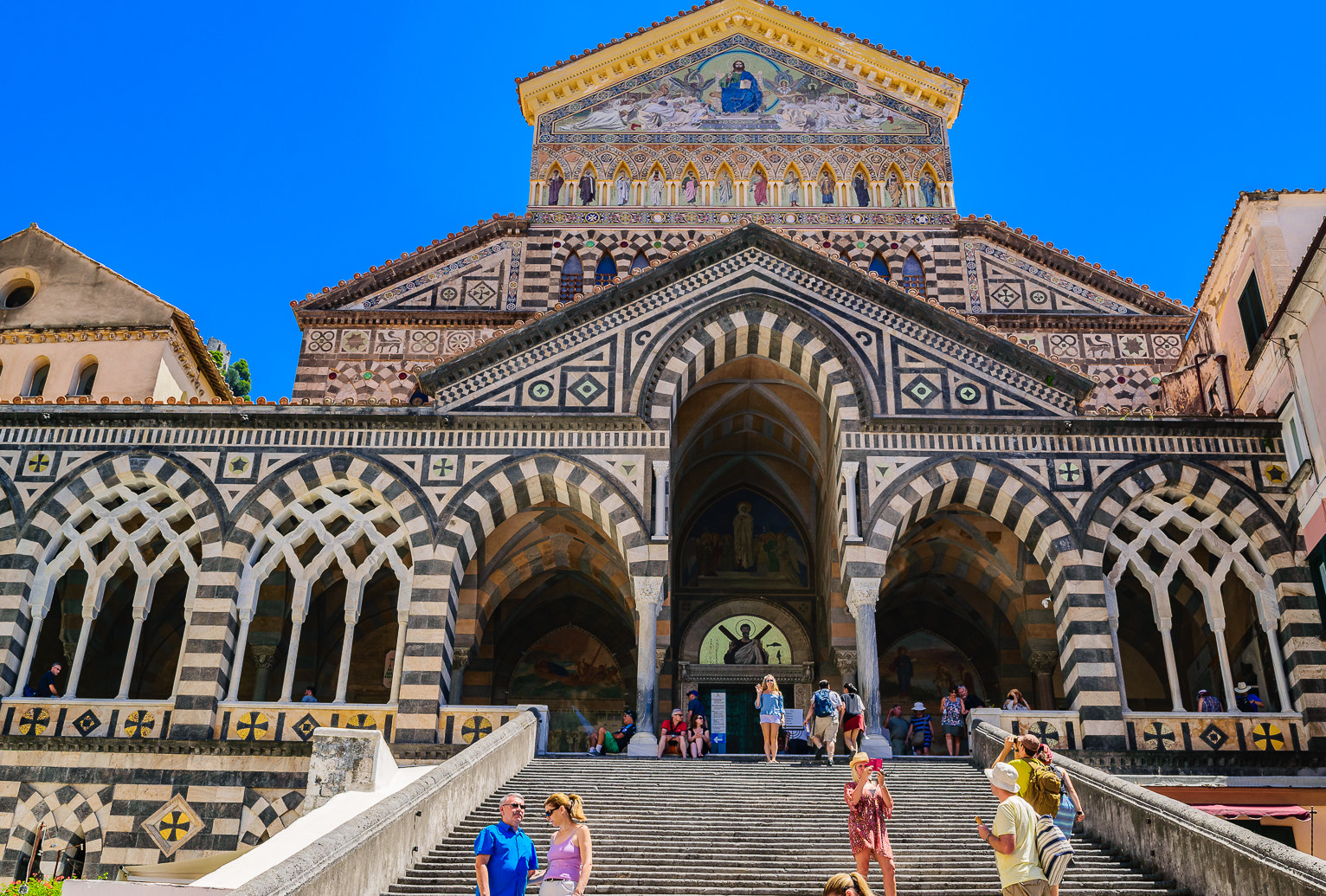
Façade of Amalfi Cathedral

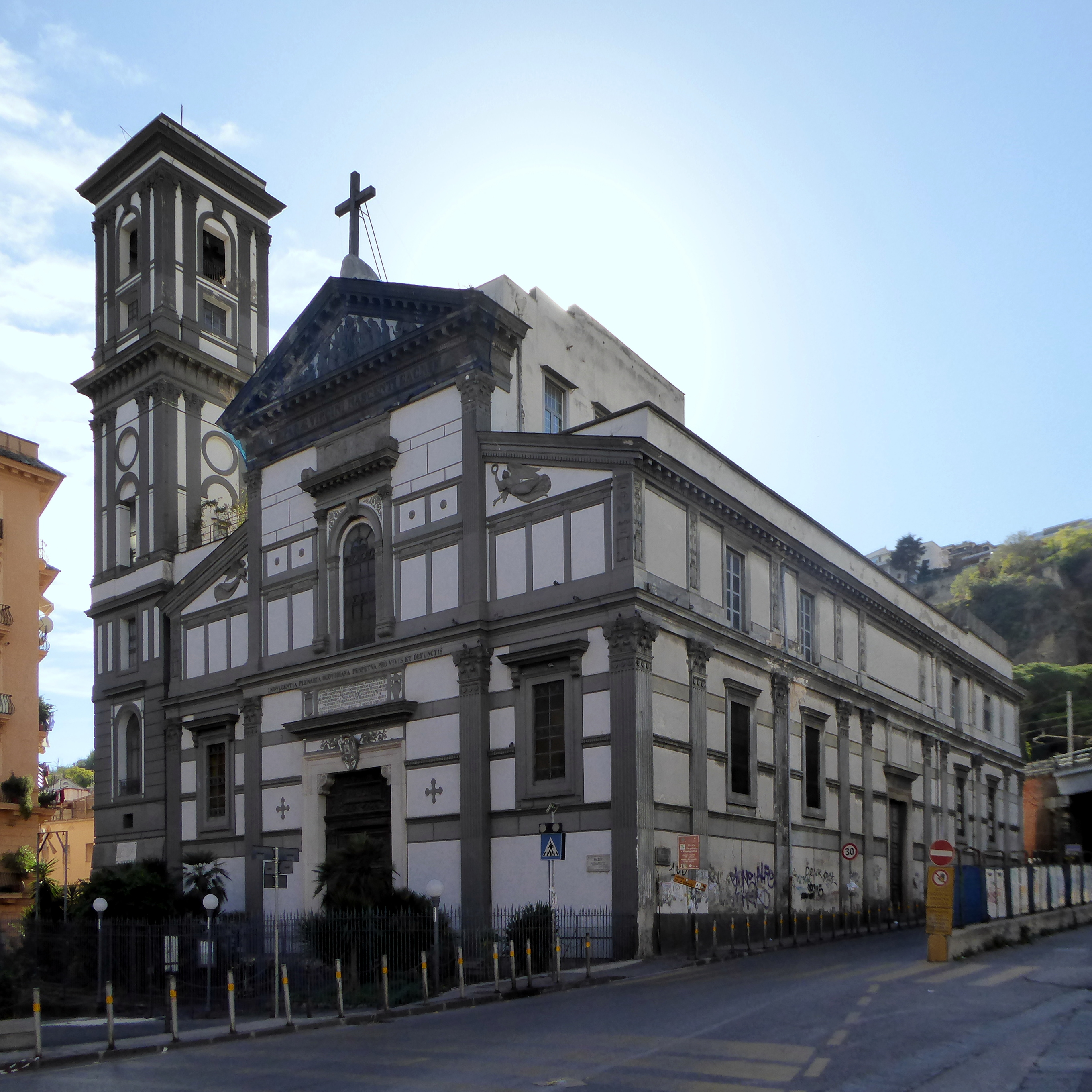
Façade of the church of Santa Maria di Piedigrotta, Naples

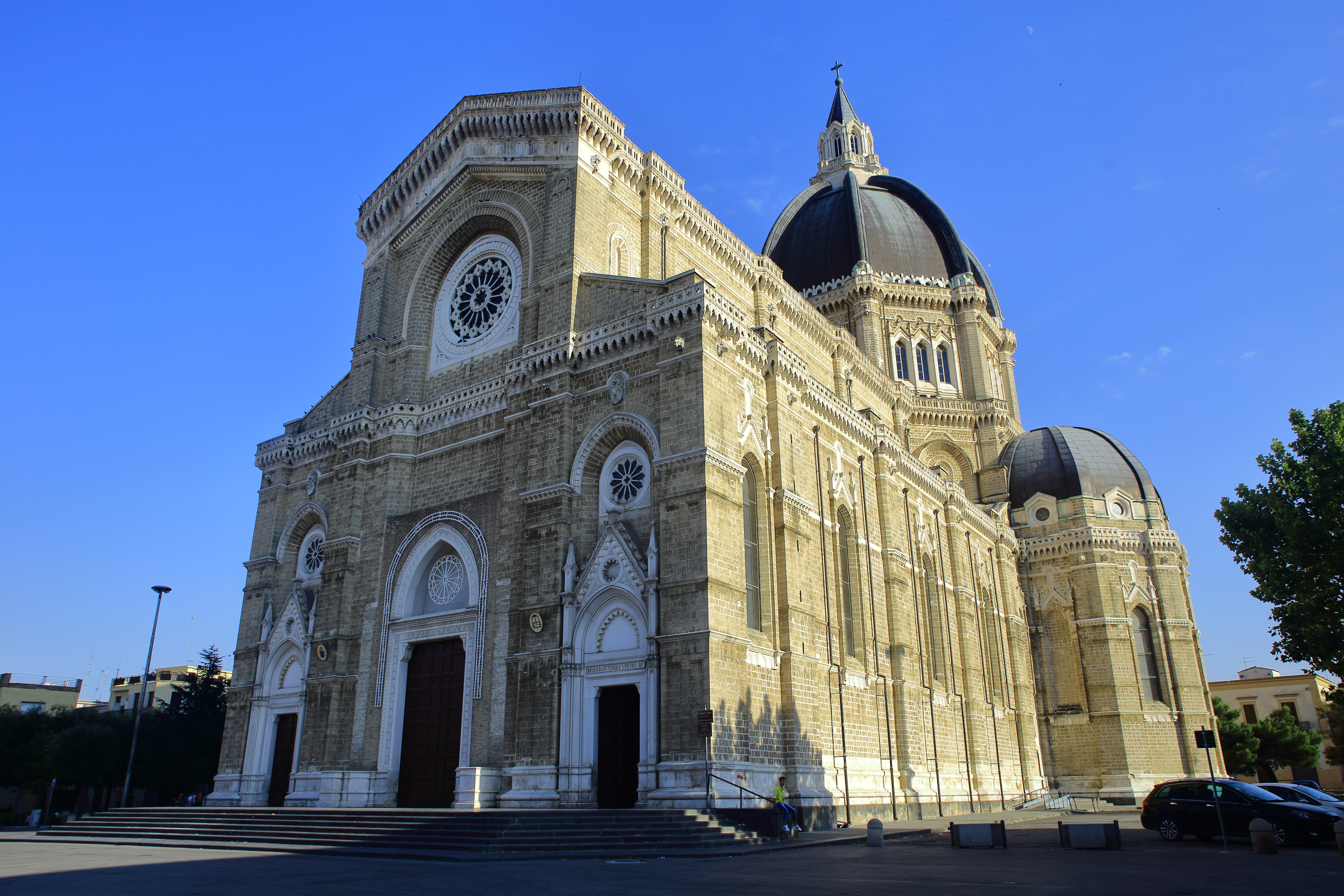
Cerignola Cathedral

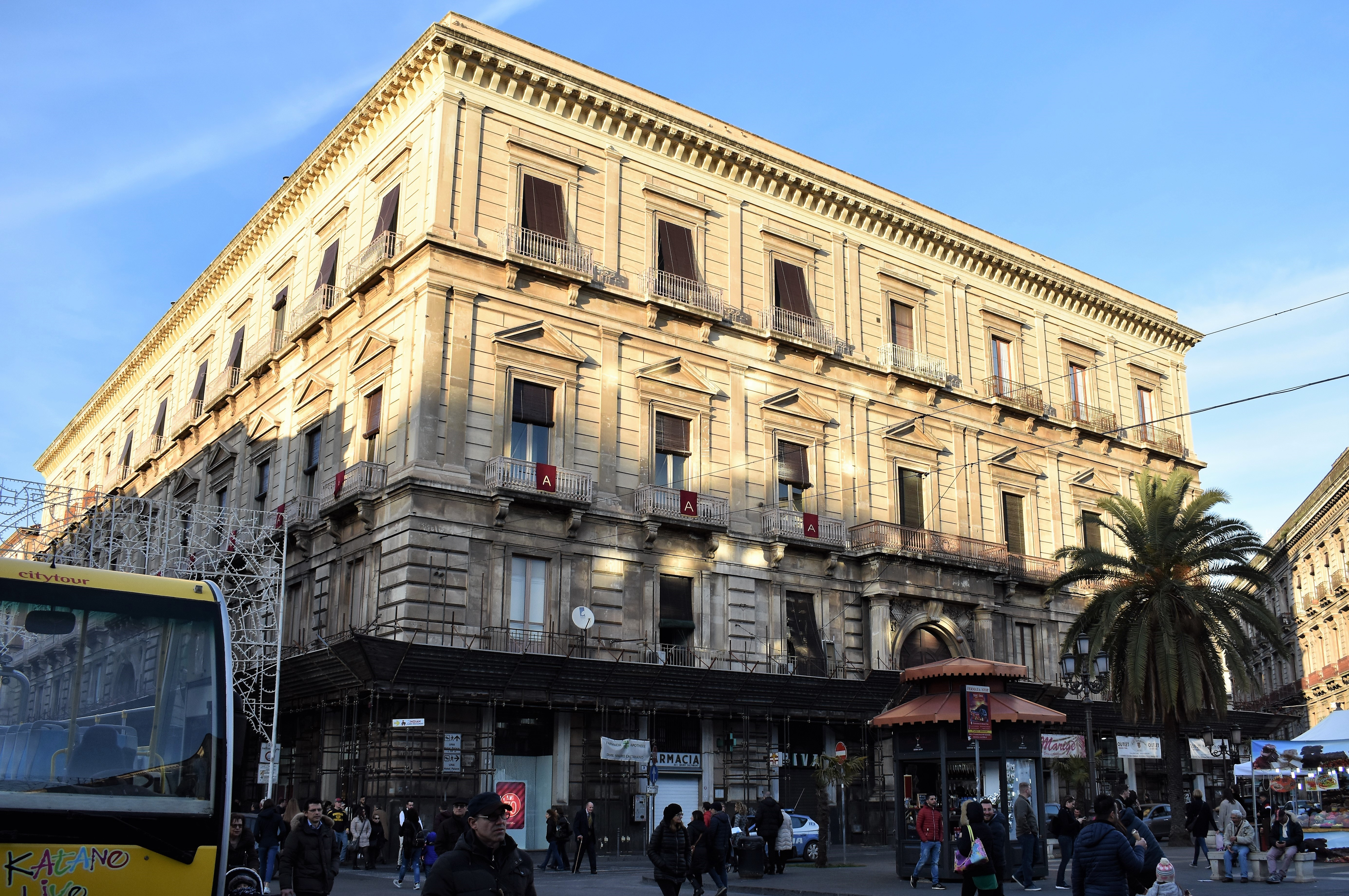
Palazzo Paternò del Toscano, Catania

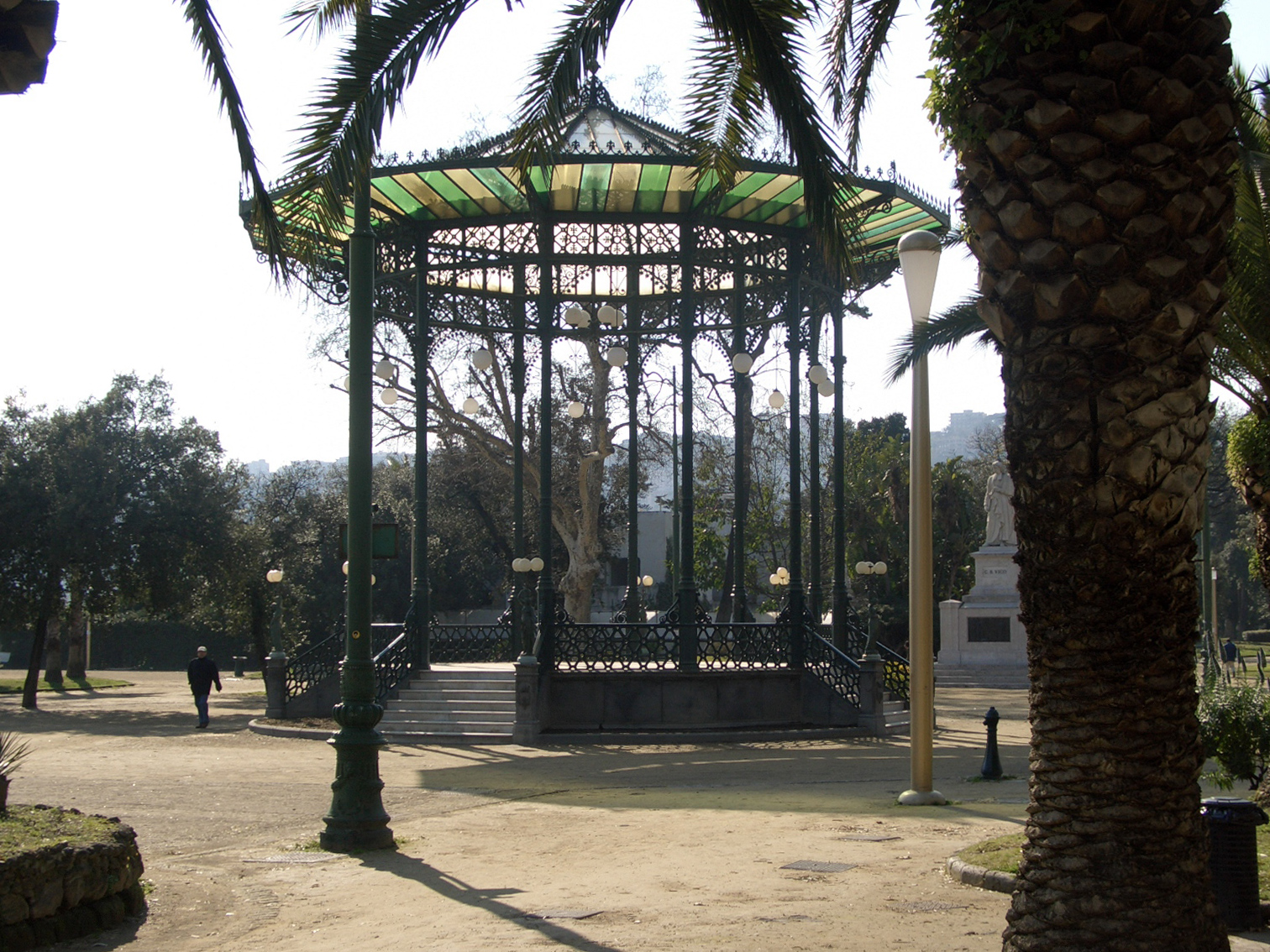
Cassa Armonica in the Villa Comunale of Naples

== Bibliography ==
- Sasso, C. N. (1856). Storia dei monumenti di Napoli. Naples.
- De Fusco, R. (1930). La scuola napoletana nei concorsi per la facciata di Santa Maria del Fiore. Naples.
- Lorenzetti, C. (1952). L'Accademia di Belle Arti di Napoli. Florence.
- De Fusco, R. (1961). "L'attività edilizia dal 1860 al 1915". In G. Ciccone; R. De Fusco (eds.). Napoli dopo un secolo. Naples. pp. 178–241.
- Bruno, G.; De Fusco, R. (1962). Enrico Alvino: Architetto e urbanista napoletano dell'Ottocento. Naples.
- Scalvini, M. L. (1990). "La facciata neogotica in Europa nel XIX e XX secolo". In R. Bossaglia; V. Terraroli (eds.). Il neogotico nel XIX e XX secolo. Milan.
