= Palazzo Paternò del Toscano =

Coordinates: 37.50772°N 15.08653°E

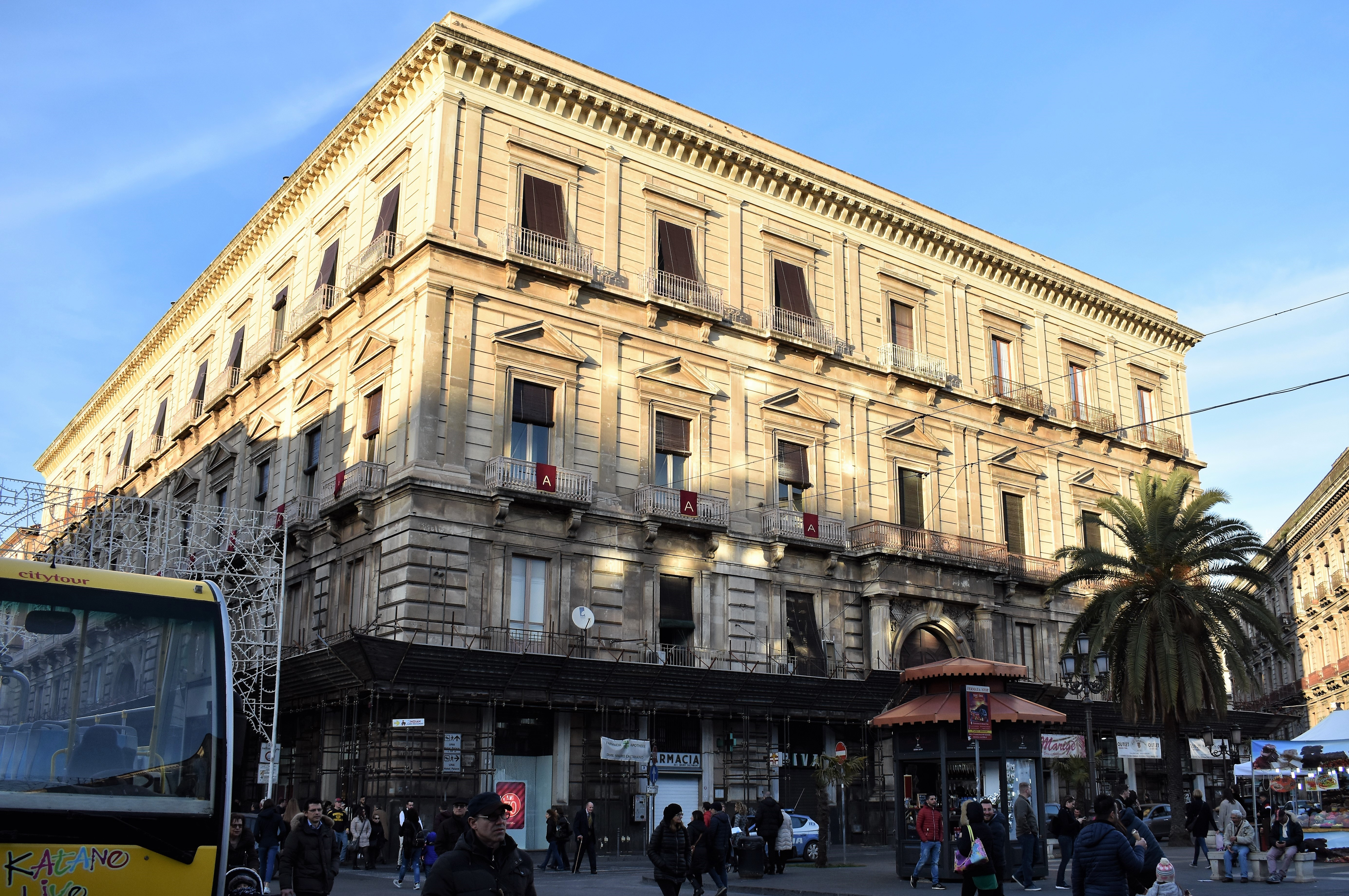
View of facade from Piazza Stesicoro

The Palazzo Paternò del Toscano, also known as the Palazzo del Toscano, is a notable palace in Piazza Stesicoro, in the center of Catania, region of Sicily, southern Italy. The building now houses many shops, but is also used by schools, and for cultural programs. The white stone facade stands before the Monument to Vincenzo Bellini and rises in contrast to the palace across via Aetna, the white and black Palazzo Tezzano.

== History ==
The construction of a palace at this site was commissioned by family of the Tedeschi Bonadies, Barons of Villermosa, in the 18th century during the urban renewal occurring after the 1693 earthquake. The architect Giovanni Battista Vaccarini, who designed many of the Baroque structures in the city, was engaged, but his work only achieved a first floor. In 1858 the palace was acquired a member of the Paternò family, a major Sicilian noble house and, in particular, by Antonino Paternò, first Marquis of Toscano, and mayor (sindaco) of Catania. Much of Vaccarini's work is obscured by long-standing scaffolding. With new ownership, continued construction and refurbishment was performed by Luigi Poletti and finally Enrico Alvino in 1870. To the latter architect, we owe the neoclassical lines, and he guided the interior decoration of the palace. Construction was complete by 1873.

== Architecture ==
The main entrance to the internal courtyard faces the Piazza. The monumental portal is flanked by columns, and has a balcony above the arch. The piano nobile is accessed via a grand staircase decorated with marble and stucco, leading to richly decorated salon. The first floor decoration has touches of Italian art nouveau style, called Liberty style. It was promulgated by the son of Antonino, Giovanbattista Paternò, who had married an aristocrat of the Caracciolo family of Naples. Giovanbattista also served as city mayor, and commissioned the interior decoration from Alessandro Abate and Giuseppe Scionti in the first decade of the twentieth century. In later decades some of the rooms were used as movie sets.
