= Palazzo delle Scienze, Catania =

Coordinates: 37.51528°N 15.09544°E

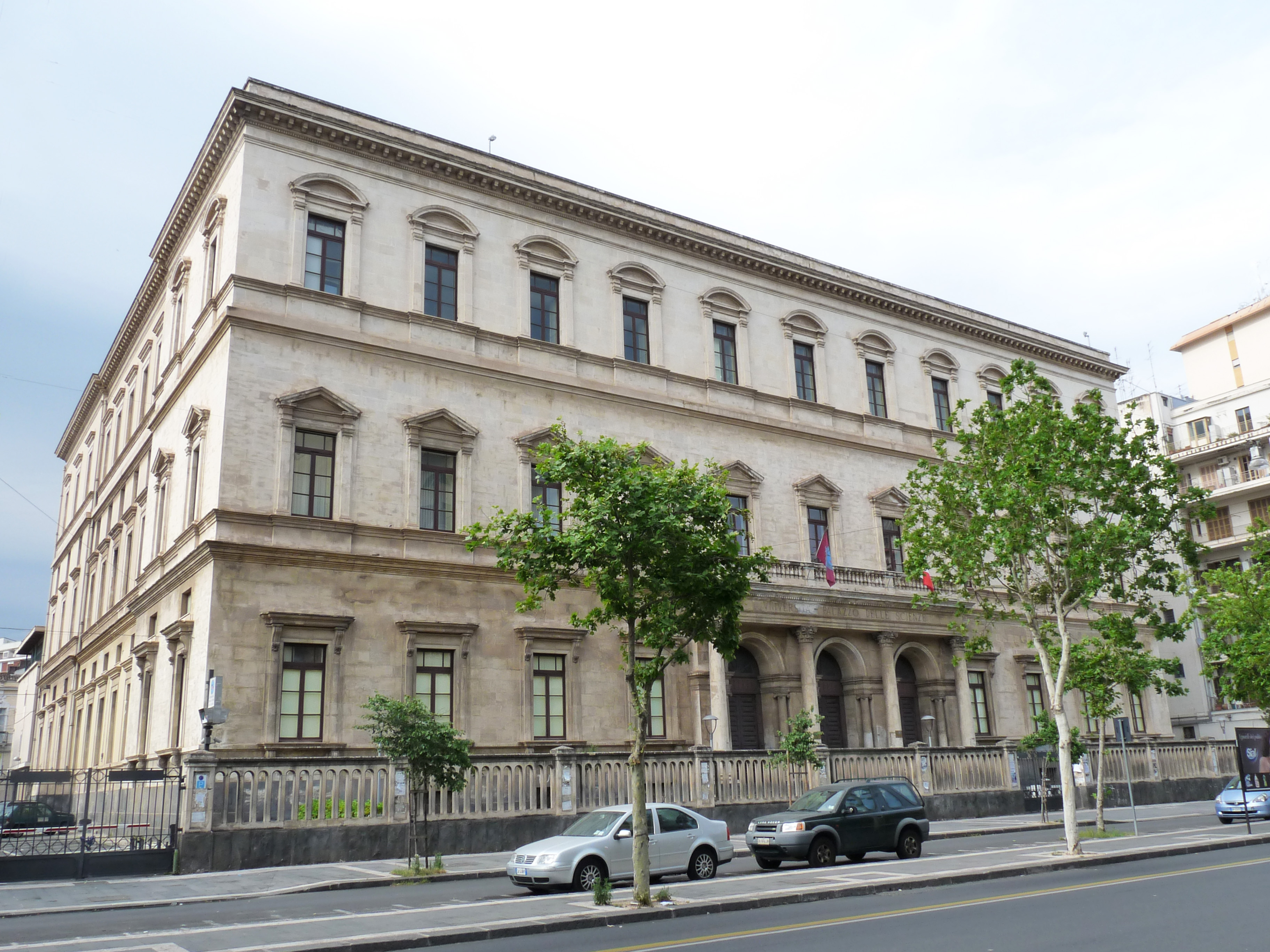
View of facade from Corso Italia

The Palazzo delle Scienze is a notable building located on Corso Italia 55 in Catania, region of Sicily, southern Italy. The building houses the Department of Economy and Business of the University of Catania. It was built between 1935 and 1942 under the designs of Vincenzo Patanè. The architect also completed the Palazzo della Borsa, Catania. The design is a sober classicism favored during the Fascist era with three story white stone and marble facade. Among the offices in the building is the Accademia Gioenia di Catania.
