= Francesco Fichera =

Italian architect (1881–1950)

- Born: 16 June 1881; Catania, Kingdom of Italy
- Died: 14 August 1950 (aged 69); Catania, Italy
- Education: Sapienza University of Rome
- Occupations: Engineer, architect

Francesco Fichera (16 June 1881 – 14 August 1950) was an Italian engineer and architect, among the leading figures in early 20th-century architecture in Sicily.

== Life and career ==
Son of Filadelfo Fichera—engineer and a prominent cultural figure in post-Unification Catania—he graduated in engineering from Rome University in 1904 and obtained a diploma in architecture in 1906. After a formative period in Palermo, influenced by Ernesto Basile and the local variant of Art Nouveau, he returned to Catania, where he took over his father's practice.

His work spans residential, public, and monumental architecture, distinguished by refined classicism, proportional clarity, and the use of local materials such as lava stone. Notable projects include Villa Simili, Villa Majorana, the Post Office buildings in Catania and Syracuse, the Technical Institute of Catania, the Garage Musumeci, and Villa Inga in Genoa, among others.

Fichera was also a scholar of Baroque and 18th-century Sicilian architecture. His major publications include Una città settecentesca (1925) and a two-volume monograph on Giovanni Battista Vaccarini (1934). In 1937, he authored a study on Luigi Vanvitelli, published by the Royal Academy of Italy.

His last significant work was the Catania Courthouse (1937–1953), where his early architectural principles—symmetry, monumentality, and a balance between tradition and functionality—re-emerge.

Fichera taught architectural design at the University of Catania for nearly four decades and was appointed a member of the Accademia di San Luca in 1925. He died in Catania on 14 August 1950.

== Sources ==
- Piacentini, Marcello (October 1939). "Recenti opere di Francesco Fichera". Architettura. No. 10. pp. 601–606.
- Sergio Polano; Marco Mulazzani, eds. (1991). Guida all'architettura italiana del Novecento. Milan: Electa. p. 534–536, 581.
- Casciato, Maristella (1997). "FICHERA, Francesco". Dizionario Biografico degli Italiani. Vol. 47. Istituto dell'Enciclopedia Italiana.
- Guarrera, Fabio (2017). Francesco Fichera. La modernità nella tradizione dell'architettura. Syracuse: Letteraventidue.
- Spina, Rosangela (April–June 2002). "L'architettura a Catania tra le due guerre. Avvenimenti, personaggi, opere" (PDF). Agorà. No. IX. Archived from the original on 2015-09-23.
