= Sant'Agata al Carcere, Catania =

Church building in Catania, Italy

Coordinates: 37.50701894117127°N 15.084352817325994°E

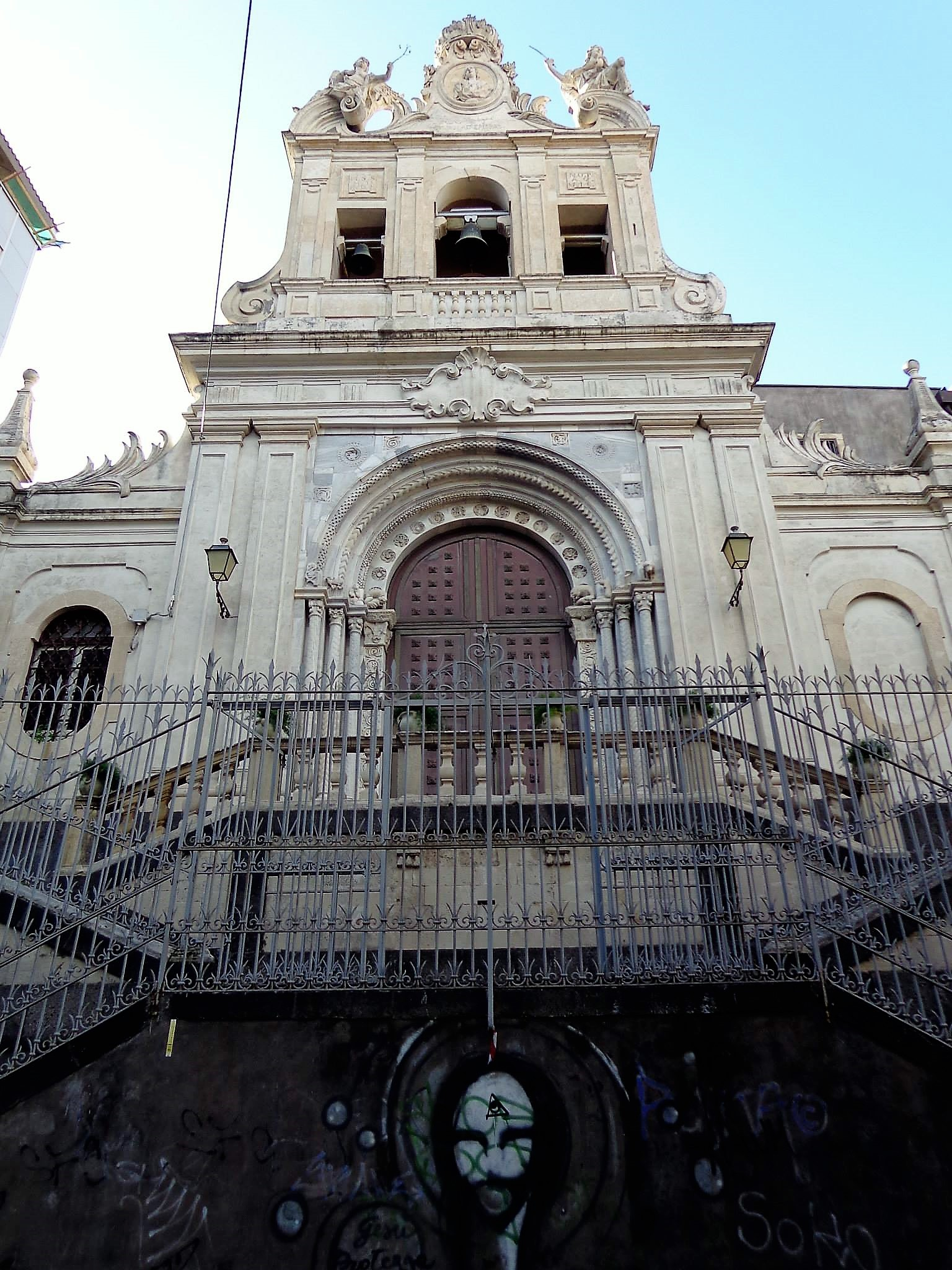
Facade with front steps

Santa Agata al Carcere (Saint Agatha at the Prison), sometimes called Santo Carcere or the Carcere church is a Roman Catholic church located on Piazza Santo Carcere #7, in the city of Catania, Sicily, southern Italy. It is one of three nearly adjacent churches dedicated in honor of St Agatha of Sicily in this neighborhood, the other two being Sant'Agata alla Fornace and Sant'Agata la Vetere.

== History and description ==
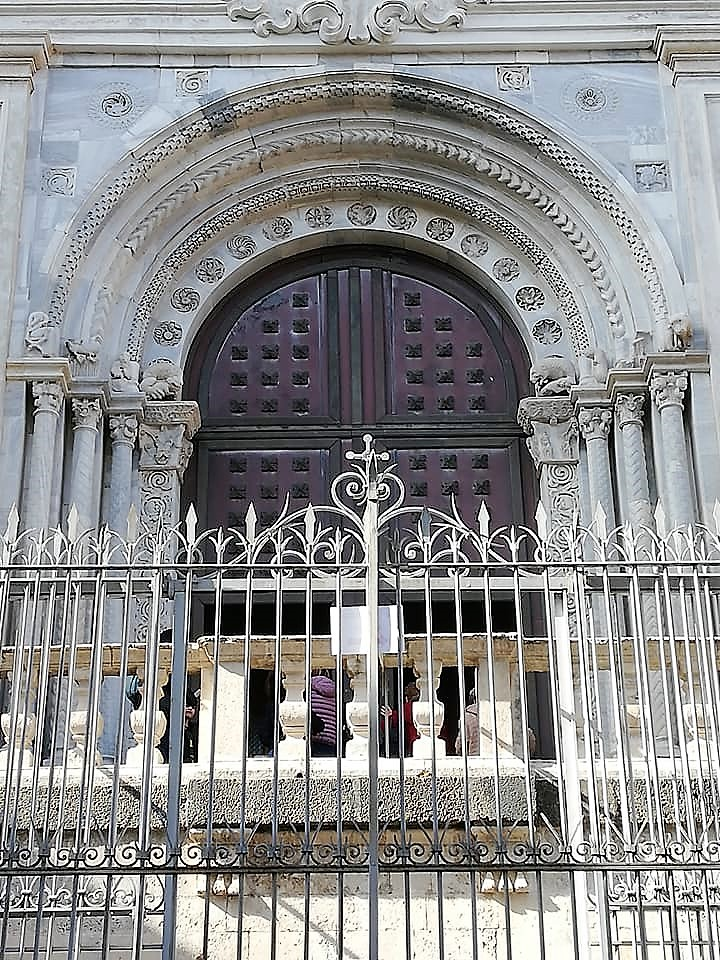
15th-century Romanesque church portal

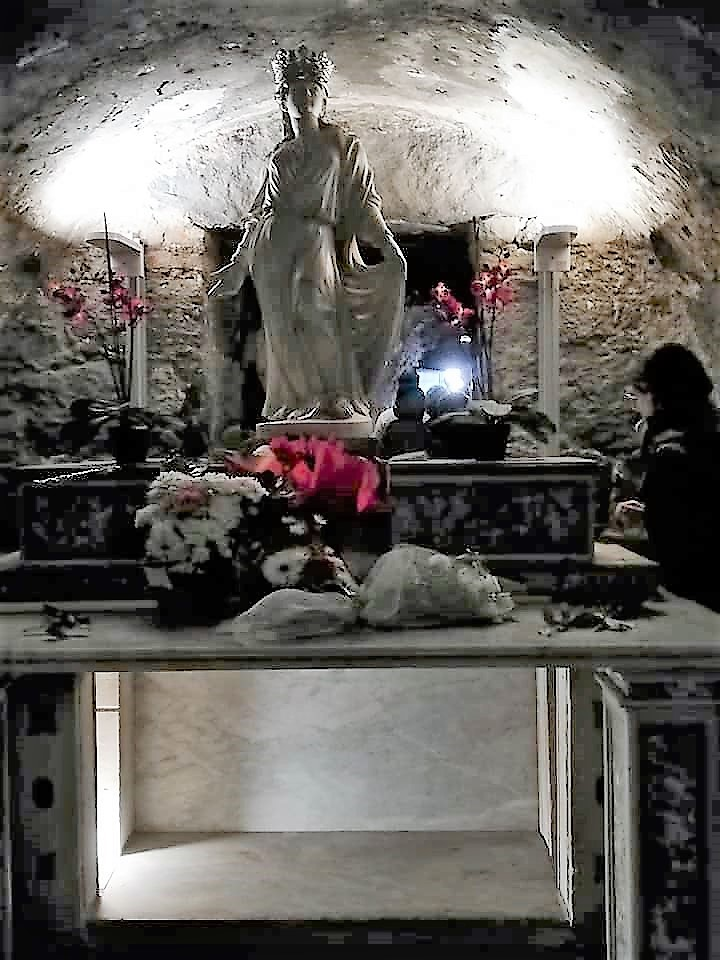
Statue of St Agatha in the underground chapel, putatively a former dungeon where Agatha miraculously survived her initial torture

The church was rebuilt after being razed, like most of the city, by the 1693 Sicily earthquake. The portal of the church is said to be the original highly sculpted Romanesque stone portal of the ancient cathedral of Catania. The portal, profusedly decorated by floral and animal depictions, was initially erected in the cathedral during the reign of Ruggero I of Sicily (1031-1101). While the cathedral was destroyed by the earthquake, the portal survived. It was rescued in 1734, and moved initially to the Senatorial palace, and then moved to this church by the architect Giovanni Battista Vaccarini in the mid-18th-century. The only other such arch remaining in Catania is from the ruins of the church of San Giovanni de' Fleres.

A broad series of steps lead to the portal, preceded by a balustraded balcony. On the uppermost floor of the facade, housing the church bells, rises a broken pediment, decorated with a relief depicting Saint Agatha, flanked by two reclining angels offering her the palm of martyrdom. An added detail are the palm fronds decorating the lower volutes of the facade.

The church was putatively built in a bastion of the castle that once imprisoned Saint Agatha. Remains of the 15th-century city walls form part of the north side of the church and the base of its facade. They can be seen proceeding east along via Colosseo in front of the facade. The church facade also faces the apse of the church of Sant'Agata alla Fornace (also known a San Biagio), putatively built at the site of the furnace in which Agatha miraculously survived cremation. The apse of the Carcere church meets with the apse of a third Sant'Agata church in this neighborhood: Sant'Agata la Vetere.

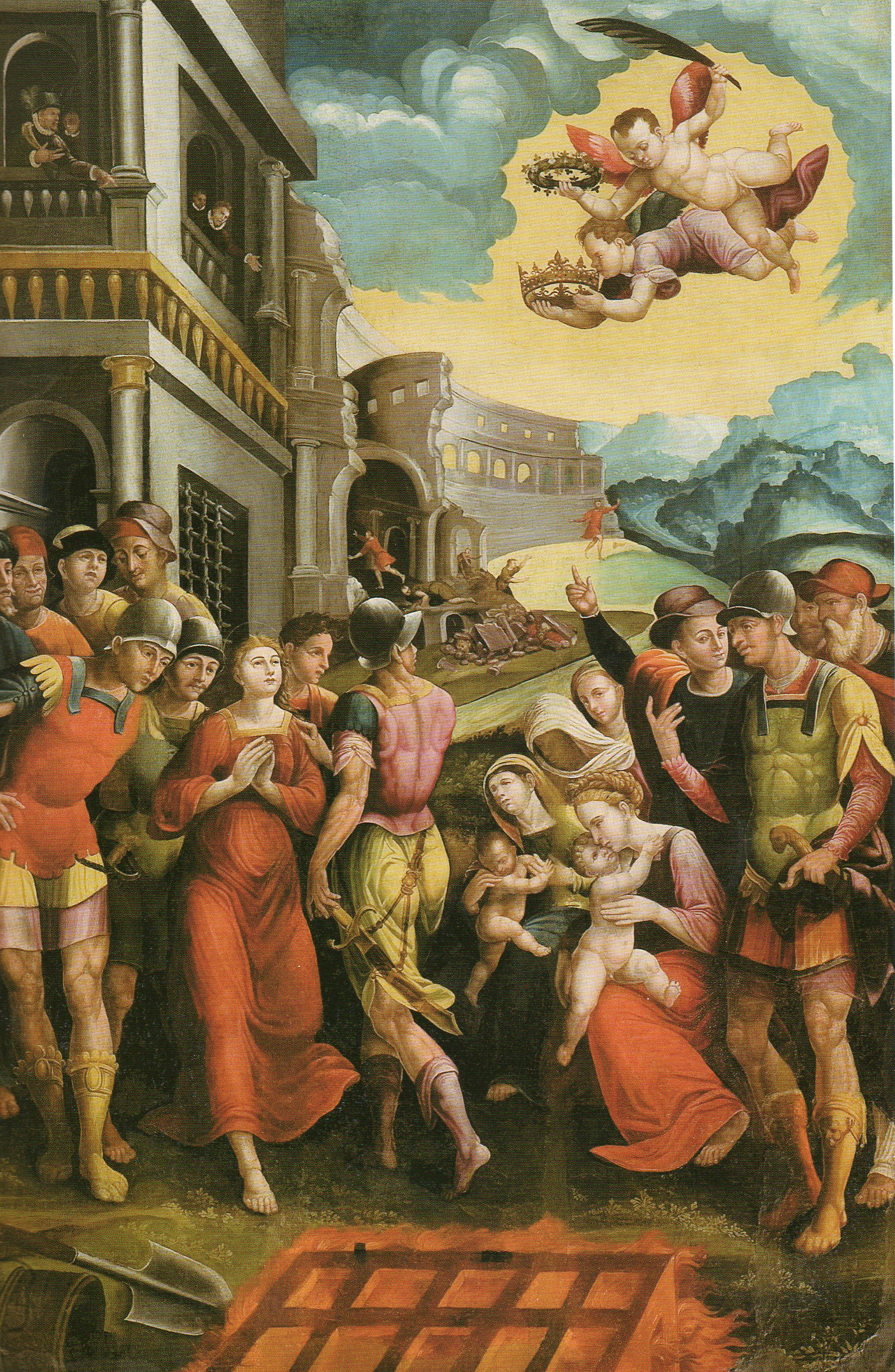
Martyrdom of Saint Agatha(1588) by Bernardino Niger

The interior of the church contains a silver chest with her relics, and lava slabs putatively with imprints of her small feet. A placard at the entrance to the prison explains that she stood here, before pushed into her prison cell. The crypt-like putative prison-cell houses a marble statue of a triumphant and healed Agatha. The main altarpiece is a depiction of the Martyrdom of Saint Agatha by “Bernardino Niger grecus” (1588). The painting depicts the Ancient Roman amphitheater in Catania behind the saint, part of which has been uncovered in Piazza Stesicoro in front of the facade of the adjacent Sant'Agata alla Fornace. A bejeweled half-bust of a plump Agatha, kept in this church is paraded across the city in procession during the Festival of Saint Agatha every February 3-5.
