= Palazzo delle Poste, Catania =

Coordinates: 37.51044°N 15.08540°E

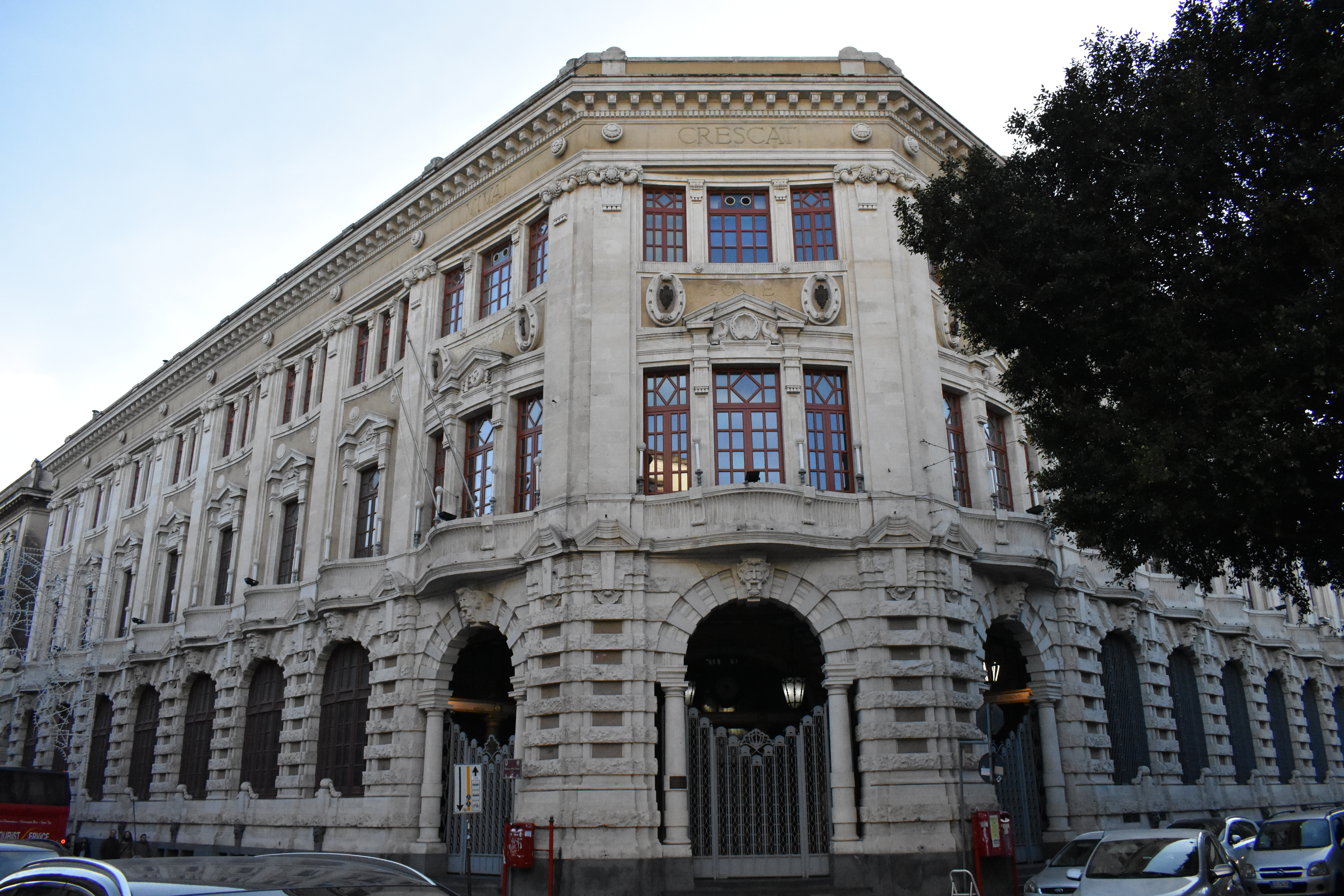
Facade from corner of Via Etnea and Giardino Bellini

The Palazzo delle Poste is a notable building, called a palace, but built for and still housing postal offices. It stands on the west corner of Via Etnea, #288, where it intersects with the start of the Giardino Bellini.

The postal building is a neo-baroque creation of the architect Francesco Fichera. Construction began in 1922 and were complete only in 1930. The three facades, along via Etnea, via Angelo Litrico, and via Sant'Euplio are similar. All contain a rusticated ground level set upon a base of dark lava stone. The ground floor is an row of arches, each with a keystone marked by a grotesque mask. The second floors have convex balconies framed by pilasters surmounted by a tympanum with a broken pediment. Behind the balconies are tall glass doors with delicate frames. The decoration throughout is often playful and imaginative. At the northeast corner, some of the decorations are cornucopias, but others appear to resemble complex starfish. The tympanum at this corner has a shell flanked by fish. The metal grate has a liberty style design. The interior courtyard now obscured by further construction, was nearly devoid of such decoration and has a simplistic brick detail more common in Fascist architecture of the time. However, the lively facade distinctly avoids the severe sobriety of contemporary "rationalist" architecture of postal offices such as the Poste palace of Palermo and the Poste palace of Naples.

The architect Fichera also designed the Garage Musumeci in Catania.
