= Monument to Vincenzo Bellini, Catania =

Coordinates: 37.5075°N 15.0866°E

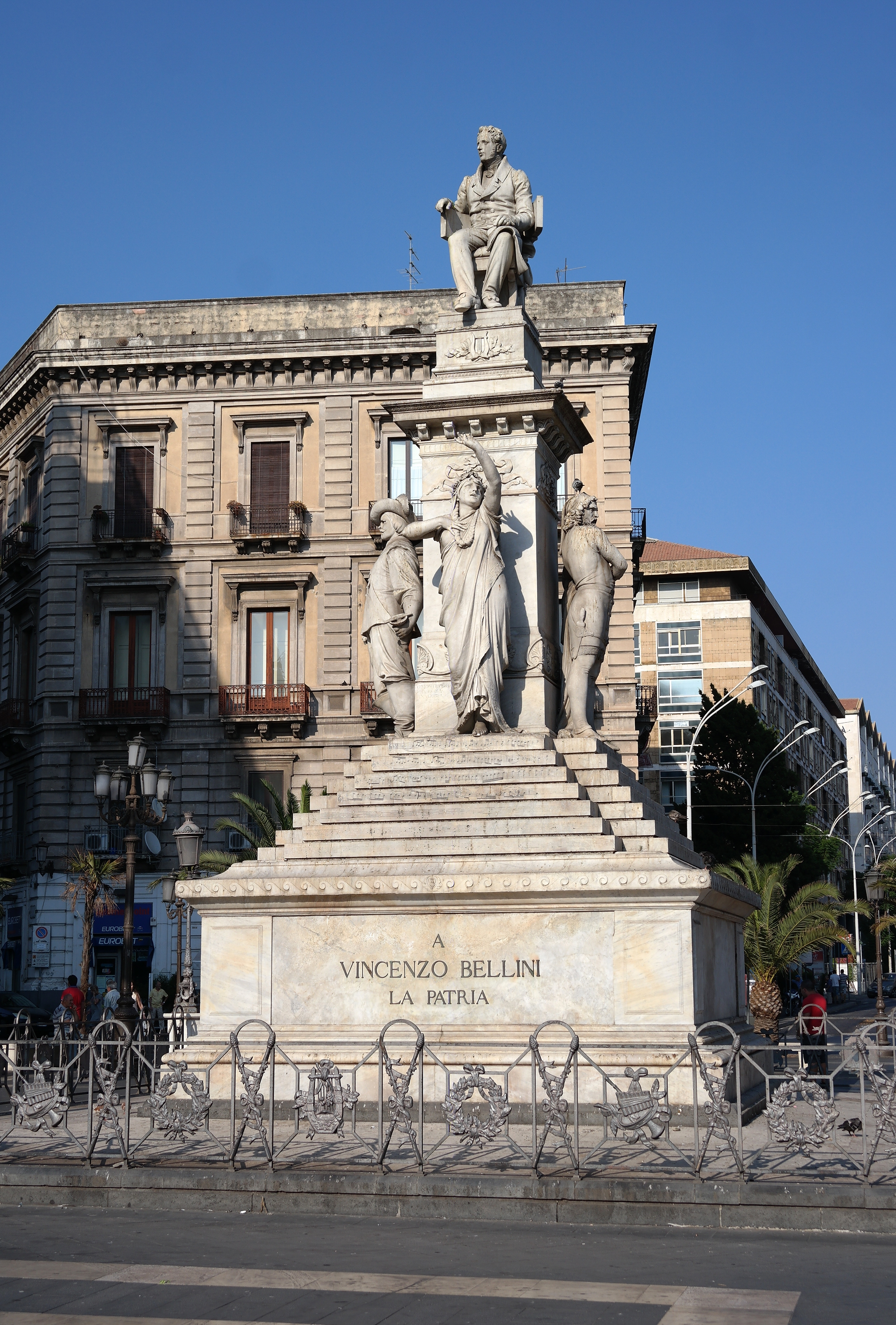
Monument to Bellini

The Monument to Vincenzo Bellini is an outdoor monument located on Piazza Stesicoro, in the city of Catania, Sicily, Italy.

== History and description ==
The monument was commissioned by the comune of Catania to celebrate the native composer of opera, Vincenzo Bellini (1801-1835). Designed and sculpted by Giulio Monteverde, and inaugurated on 21 September 1882. Initially, some wished to place the monument in front of the Teatro Massimo Bellini, then in construction, others wished to replace the Statue of the Elephant in Piazza del Duomo. Putatively, part of the reason to site the monument here was to allow the composer to face a church Sant'Agata alla Fornace, affiliated with the veneration of the patron saint of Catania, Saint Agatha, to which the composer had shown a devotion.

The composer is seated atop a column, but leaning forward, with a manuscript on the left knee. Below him is a seven register pyramid. Around him are four statues representing four of his operas: Norma, I puritani, La sonnambula, and Il pirata. The monument is surrounded by a metal fence with Art Nouveau decoration.
