= Sant'Agata la Vetere, Catania =

Church building in Catania, Italy

Coordinates: 37°30′25.2″N 15°5′00.5″E

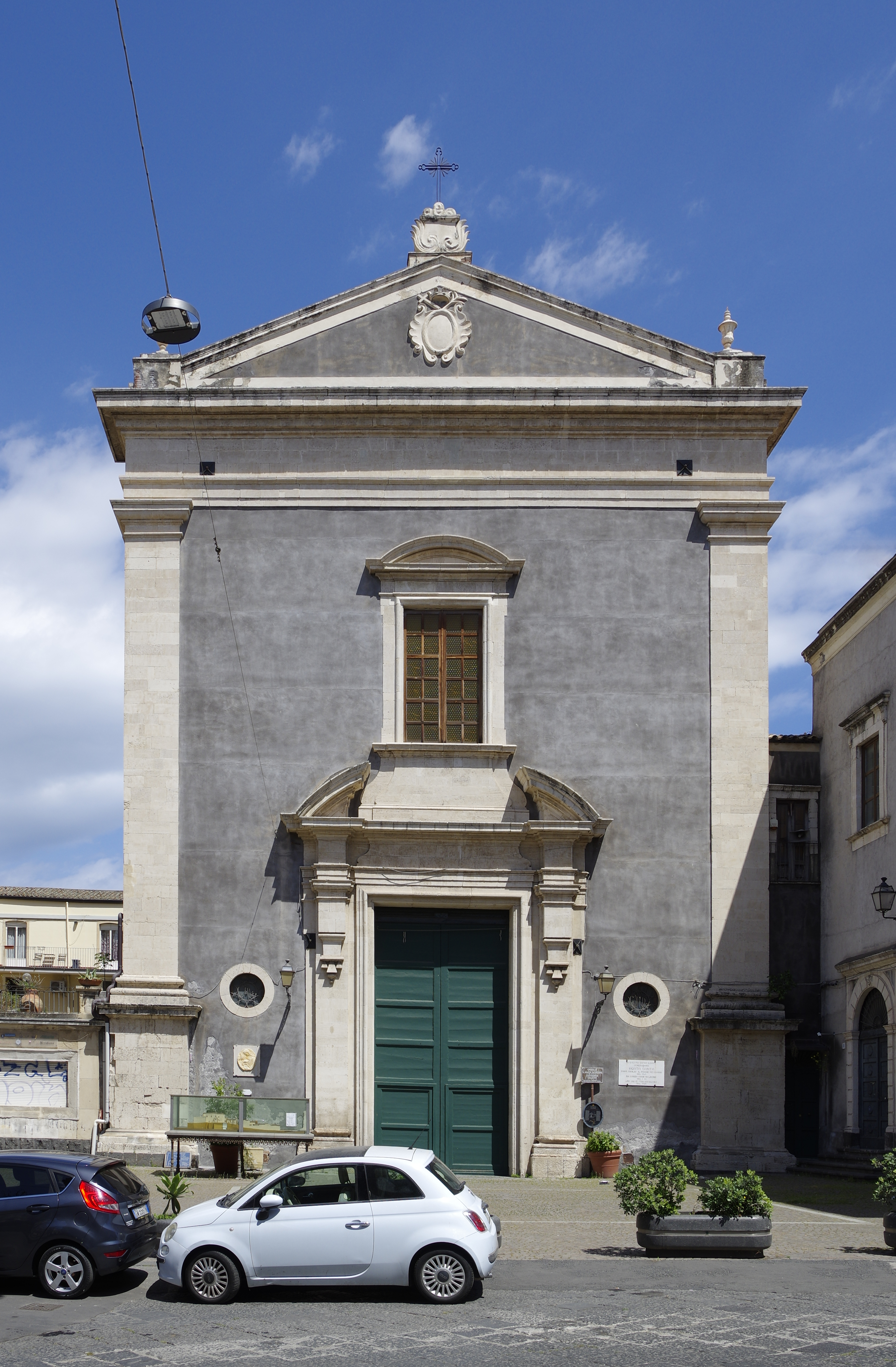
Facade of church

Sant'Agata la Vetere is a Roman Catholic church located in the piazza of the same name (along via Santa Maddalena) in Catania, Sicily, southern Italy. East of church and nearby, but facing in the other direction, are two other churches dedicated in honor of St Agatha of Sicily: the church of Sant'Agata al Carcere and two blocks east on Piazza Stesicoro is Sant'Agata alla Fornace, now known San Biagio.

== History and description ==
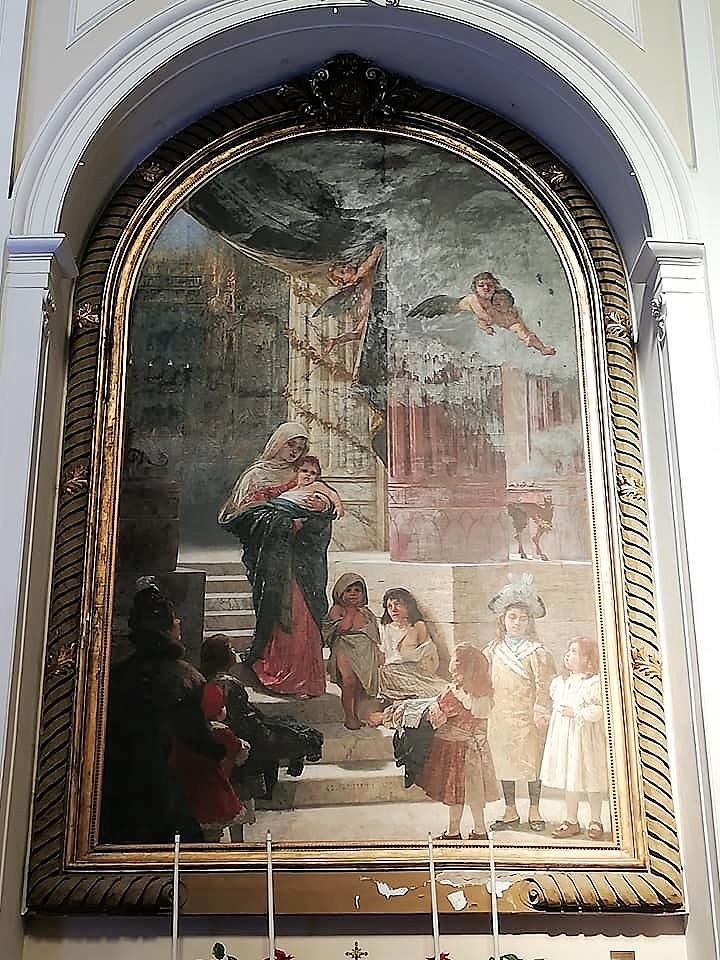
Vision of the Madonna dei Bambini by Giuseppe Sciuti

An aedicule recalling the site where Agatha of Sicily fa, was erected by bishop St Everio some 13 years after her death in 264. A church at this site was putatively established by bishop San Severino between 380 and 436, making it among the oldest churches in the city. Enlarged circa 777, the church served as Catania's cathedral for eight centuries, until replaced by the new Sant'Agata Cathedral at the eastern edge of the city, thus the suffix la vetere given to this church.

It is putatively sited at the site where Saint Agatha was placed on trial. Her relics were supposed brought here in the 8th century, when the area was used for burials. It is said the Byzantine general George Maniakes brought her relics to Constantinople in 1040, during his raid to reconquer what was then the Emirate of Sicily. Putatively they were returned in 1026, though as typical for many saint relics, multiple pieces of her body are claimed by various churches in Europe.

Since the start of the 17th century, the church was assigned to the Franciscan order, who built an adjacent convent. It stood surrounded on three sides by the 16th-century city walls. In 1818, an earthquake caused the roof to collapse. The small church present now was rebuilt after the 1693 earthquake, with traces of the ancient Roman substructures in the crypt. The church houses the putative sarcophagus of Saint Agatha with Roman marble and Byzantine stone additions. Now used as an altar, it once housed the relics of the saint.

The exterior is sparse and sober, with a broken pediment over the portal. The interior contains an altarapiece by Giuseppe Sciuti.
