= Garage Musumeci, Catania =

Coordinates: 37.51047°N 15.09436°E

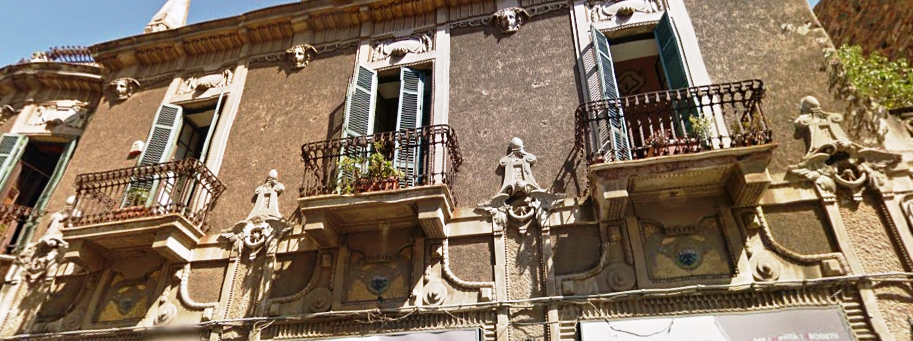
Second story of Garage Musumeci

The Garage Musumeci is a notable building, elaborated in a flamboyant Liberty style, and built to house both an automobile showroom on the ground floor and above the apartments of the owner, Baron Musemeci. It is located in Piazza Bovio, at the intersection of Via Conte di Torino and Via Francesco Crispi, in the city of Catania, region of Sicily, Italy.

The building was designed by Francesco Fichera, who also designed the Palazzo delle Poste in Catania. The elaborate design was maligned during the Fascist era by Pietro Maria Bardi and the architects of MIAR (Movement for Italian Rational Architecture). The facade has a chamfered corner with a large rounded corner balcony. The walls contain colorful gilded mosaics and large face masks.

The ground floor houses a shop selling car parts and accessories. The Palazzo Musumeci on Viale XX Settembre #76 was a residential palace built in a sober late-Baroque style.
