= Catania Courthouse =

Judiciary building in Catania, Italy

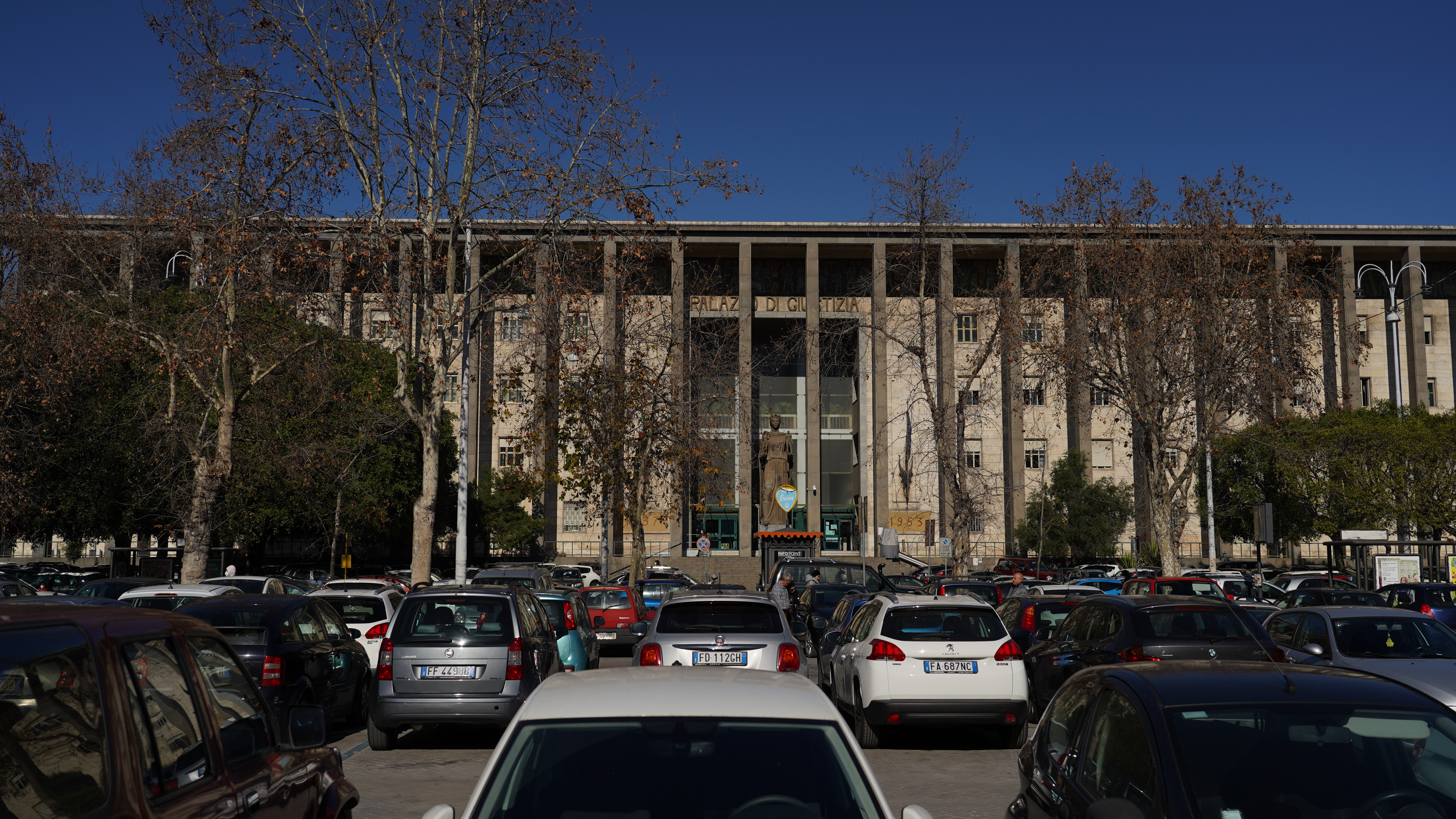
- Interactive map of the Catania Courthouse area

General information
- Type: Courthouse
- Location: Catania, Sicily, Italy
- Coordinates: 37°30′54.7″N 15°05′33.8″E
- Construction started: 1937
- Completed: 1953

Design and construction
- Architect: Francesco Fichera

The Catania Courthouse (Palazzo di Giustizia) is a judicial complex located on Piazza Giovanni Verga in Catania, Italy.

== History ==
The courthouse in Catania was designed by Francesco Fichera beginning in 1932. The chosen site, formerly known as Piazza d'Armi, had hosted the Second Sicilian Agricultural Exhibition in 1907.

The final design, approved in 1937 after several earlier proposals, saw construction delayed by World War II and completed only in 1953.

== Description ==
Fichera sought to reconcile classicism, Mediterranean identity, and modern functionalism, offering an ideal reinterpretation of ancient Sicilian architecture through a refined synthesis of form and material. The project employed local materials, such as lava stone and Comiso limestone, to enhance chromatic and luminous effects.

The building's layout, inspired by Roman basilicas, is organized around a central gallery with geometric floor patterns, illuminated from above and connected to the courtrooms through walkways and balconies. The courtrooms, 8.5 meters high, open onto eight internal courtyards, and are distinguished by concave or convex back walls, fresco decoration, and wooden furnishings.

The main façade features 18-meter-high pilasters in reinforced concrete clad in lava stone, a monumental staircase, a 7.4-meter bronze statue of Justice by Mimì Lazzaro, and a 100-meter ceramic frieze by Eugenio Russo, illustrating symbolic episodes from the history of justice. The façade, clad in light limestone and articulated by regular windows, reinterprets classical language in a modern key. The original east elevation included a portico, later enclosed in the 1960s to provide additional office space.

== Sources ==
- Barbera, Paola (2002). Architettura in Sicilia tra le due guerre. Palermo: Sellerio. p. 56.
- Di Benedetto, Giuseppe (2018). Antologia dell'architettura moderna in Sicilia. Palermo: 40due Edizioni. pp. 141–146, 225.
- Fichera, Francesco (1937). Progetto pel palazzo di giustizia in Catania. Relazione. Catania: Tipografia Fratelli Viaggio-Campo.
- Maggiulli, Enrico (November 1953). "Il nuovo Palazzo di Giustizia di Catania". Tecnica e Ricostruzione. No. 11. pp. 241–252.
- Piacentini, Marcello (October 1939). "Recenti opere di Francesco Fichera". Architettura. No. 10. pp. 601–606.
