= San Biagio, Catania =

Church building in Catania, Italy

Coordinates: 37.507444°N 15.085917°E

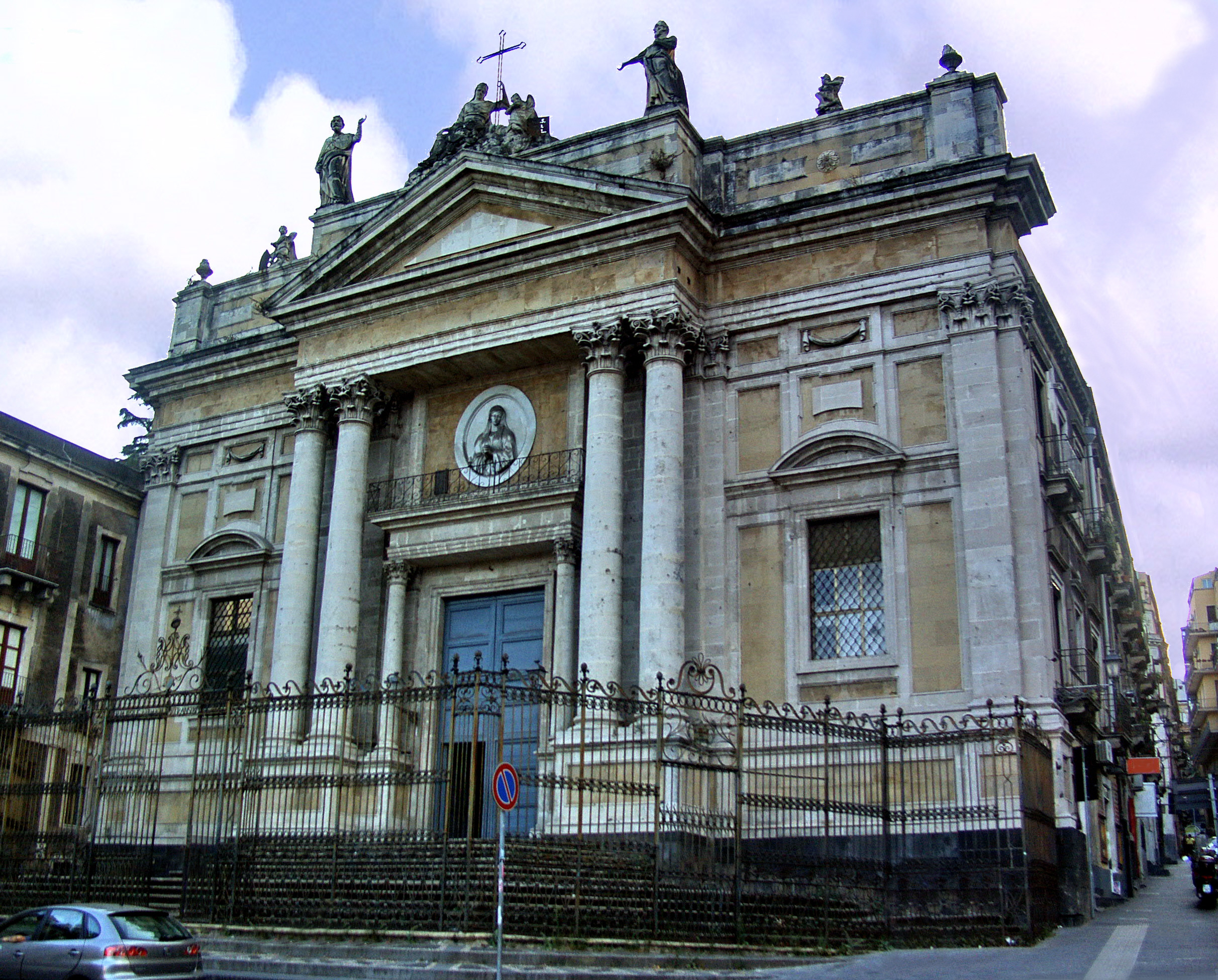
Facade of San Biagio

San Biagio, previously called Sant'Agata alla Fornace or La Fornace or Carcara is a Neoclassical architecture, Roman Catholic parish church located at the western edge of the Piazza Stesicoro in the quartiere San Biagio della Calcarella, of Catania, Sicily, southern Italy. The church overlooks a portion of the ruins of the former Ancient Roman amphitheater, while behind the apse in succession are two other churches dedicated in honor of St Agatha of Sicily: the church of Sant'Agata al Carcere and two blocks west facing the opposite direction is Sant'Agata la Vetere.

== History and description ==
Originally there were two churches in this area, one dedicated in honor of St Blaise (Biagio) and a church putatively built atop the furnace from which St Agatha miraculously escaped. The church dedicated in honor of Sant'Agata had been here since the 11th-century. After the 1693 earthquake collapsed the prior structures, the present church building was commissioned and the two parishes joined.
