= Piazza Stesicoro =

Coordinates: 37°30′26.8″N 15°5′9.3″E

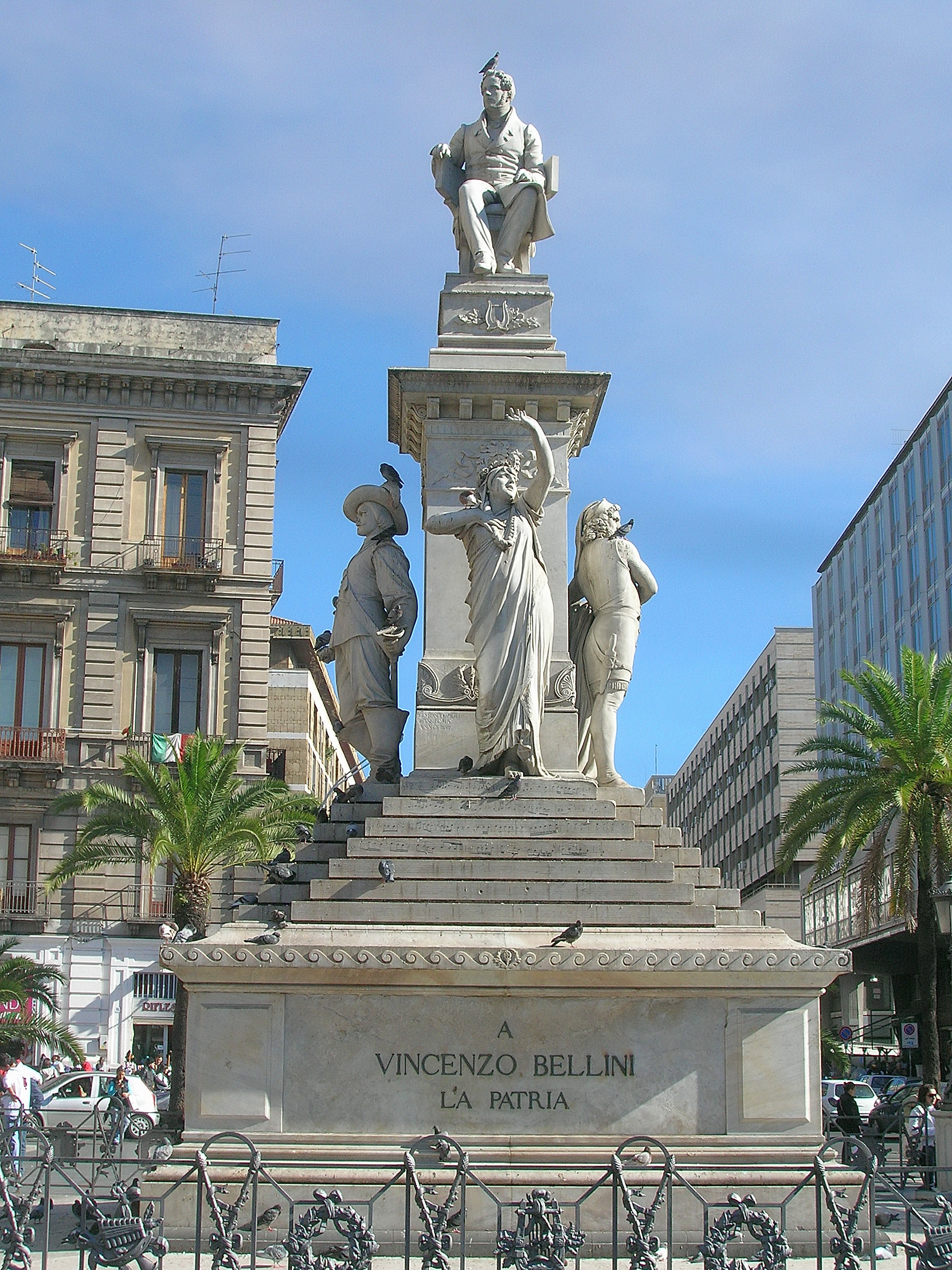
Monument to Vincenzo Bellini in Piazza Stesicoro

Piazza Stesicoro is a rectangular city square in the historic center of the city of Catania, in Sicily, Italy.

The piazza is frequently host to markets. The circumvalent street is bisected by Via Etna and at the eastern end opens to the modern boulevard of corso Sicilia. The western half of the piazza displays ruins of the former Ancient Roman amphitheater of Catania. Facing the ruins is the neoclassical facade of the church of San Biagio, also known as Sant'Agata alla Fornace. Also facing the piazza are the following buildings: Palazzo Tezzano; Palazzo Paternò del Toscano; and the Palazzo Beneventano della Corte.

An 1842 guide to Sicily recalls the piazza hosting a monument to King Ferdinand II of the Two Sicilies, with the monarch dressed in Ancient Roman garb. this monument had been removed by 1864 after the 1861 defeat by Garibaldi of the armies of the Bourbon monarchy of Naples and Sicily. The monument honoring Ferdinand's father King Francis I, which had been at Piazza dell'Universita was also removed during this period.

The Ferdinand monument was replaced by the present Monument to Vincenzo Bellini, the composer of operas, with a base surrounded by characters from his operas.
