= Elephant Fountain =

Monument in Catania, Sicily

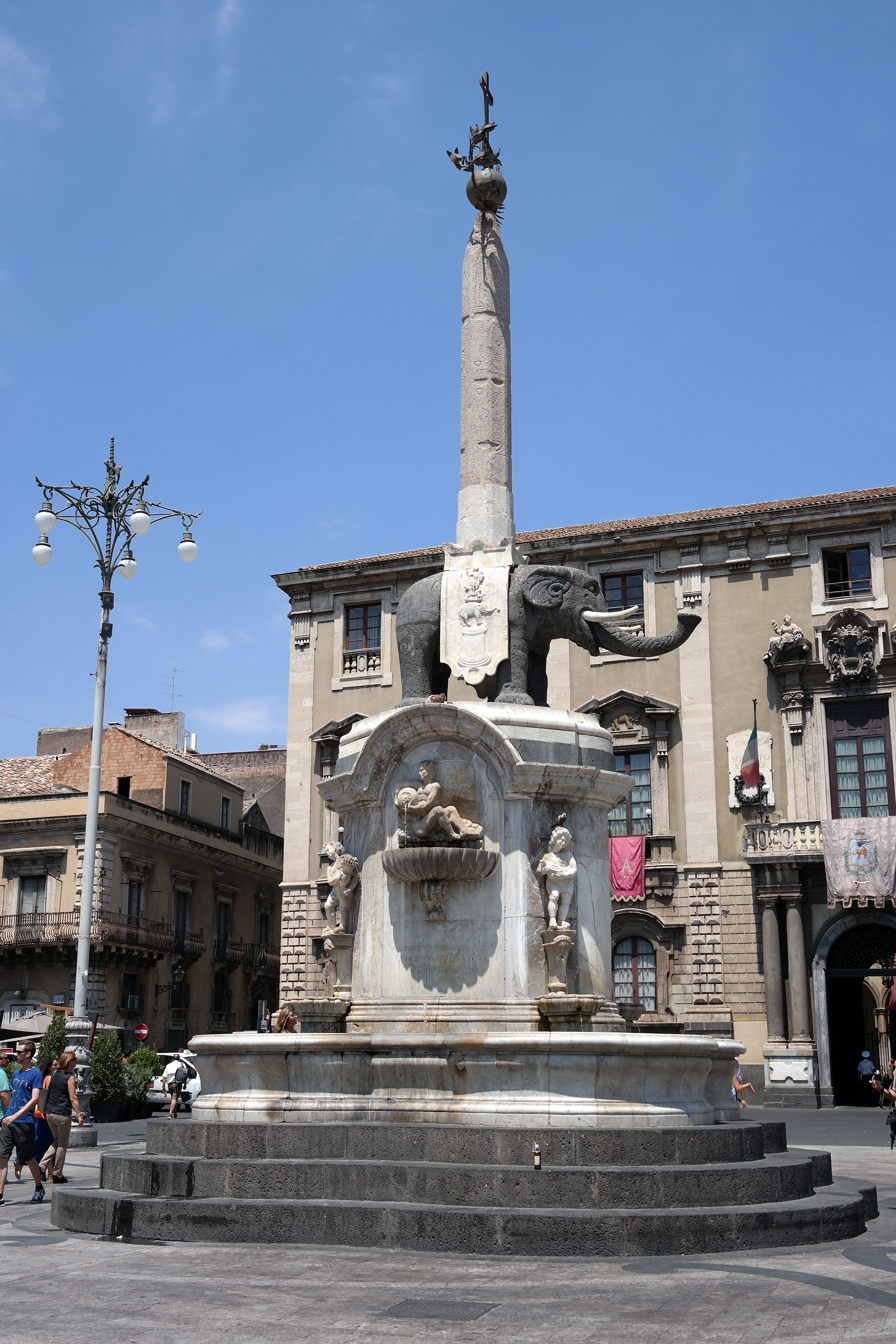
the Elefant Fountain view from the South with the Palazzo degli Elefanti in the background

The Elephant Fountain (Italian: Fontana dell'Elefante) is a monument located in the center of Piazza del Duomo in the Sicilian city of Catania, designed by architect Giovanni Battista Vaccarini between 1735 and 1737. Its main element is a black basalt statue of an elephant, commonly called u Liotru (Sicilian pronunciation: [ʊ lɪˈɔːʈɽʊ]), which has become the emblem of the city of Catania.

== Structure ==
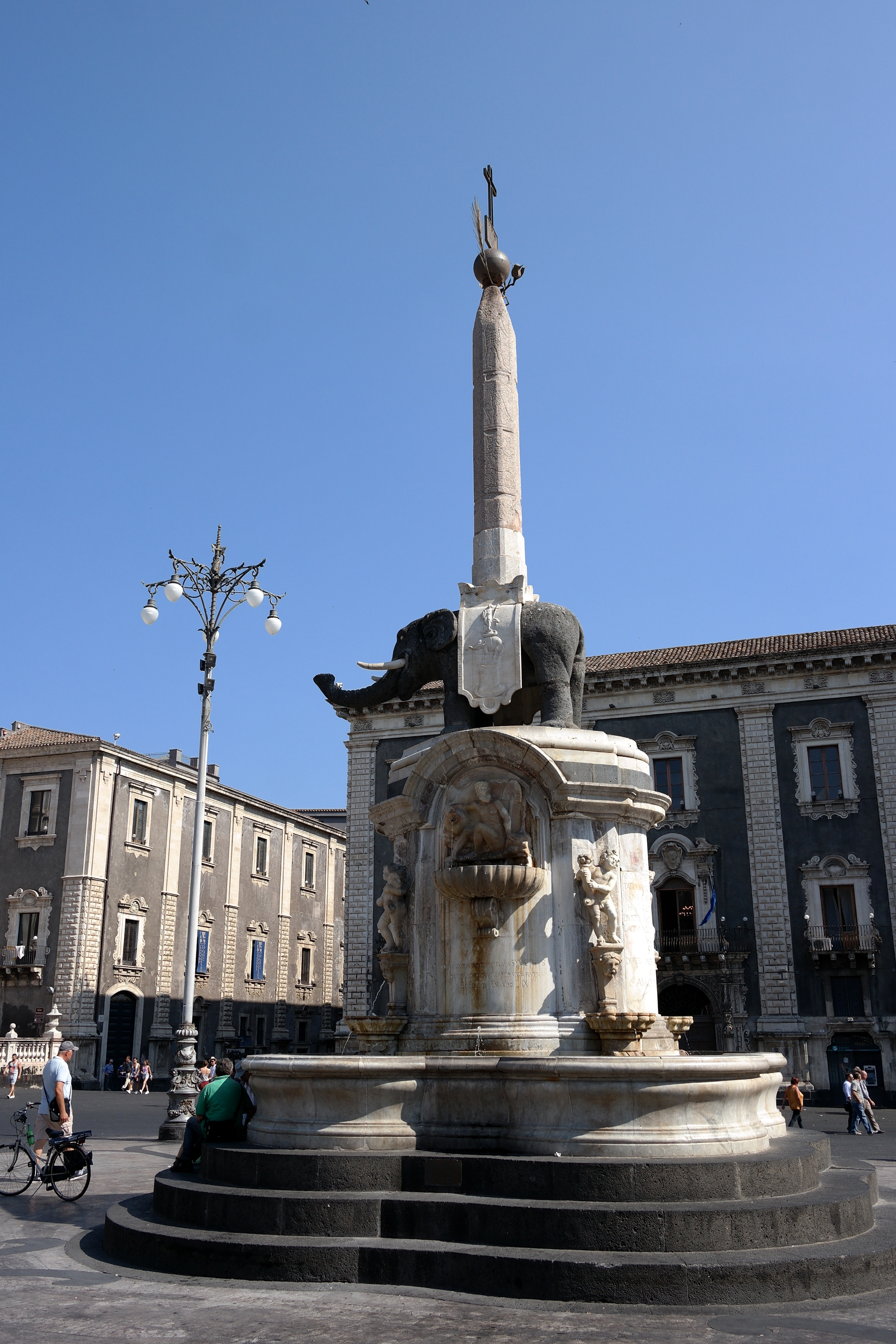
Elephant Fountain view from the north

The Elephant Fountain was created by Giovanni Battista Vaccarini, an architect from Palermo, as part of the rebuilding of the city of Catania after the January 11, 1693 earthquake. Most scholars believe that Vaccarini was inspired by Gian Lorenzo Bernini's Elephant and Obelisk, a similar structure in Rome's Piazza della Minerva. However, other possibilities exist; an elephant surmounted by an obelisk with a ball on top is documented in the Hypnerotomachia Poliphili, page 38, (Venice, 1499) attributed to Francesco Colonna.

The plinth consists of a white marble pedestal located in the center of a basin, also made of marble, into which jets of water fall and spout from the plinth. On the plinth two sculptures reproduce the two rivers of Catania, the Simeto and the Amenano. Above is the statue of the elephant, its proboscis facing the cathedral of St. Agatha, patron saint of Catania.

On the animal's back is an Egyptian-style obelisk, 3.66 meters high, made of granite, hypothetically from Syene; it has no hieroglyphics, but is decorated with Egyptian-style figures that do not constitute meaningful hieroglyphic writing. Of uncertain chronology, it may have been one of the two destinations of Catania's ancient Roman circus; the other, more fragmentary one is in the courtyard of the Ursino Castle. Mounted on the top part of the obelisk are a globe, surrounded by a crown of a palm leaf (representing martyrdom) and a branch of lilies (representing purity), plus above it a metal tablet on which there is an inscription dedicated to St. Agatha with the acronym "MSSHDEPL" ("Sound and sincere mind, for the honor of God and the liberation of her homeland"), and finally a cross.

== History ==
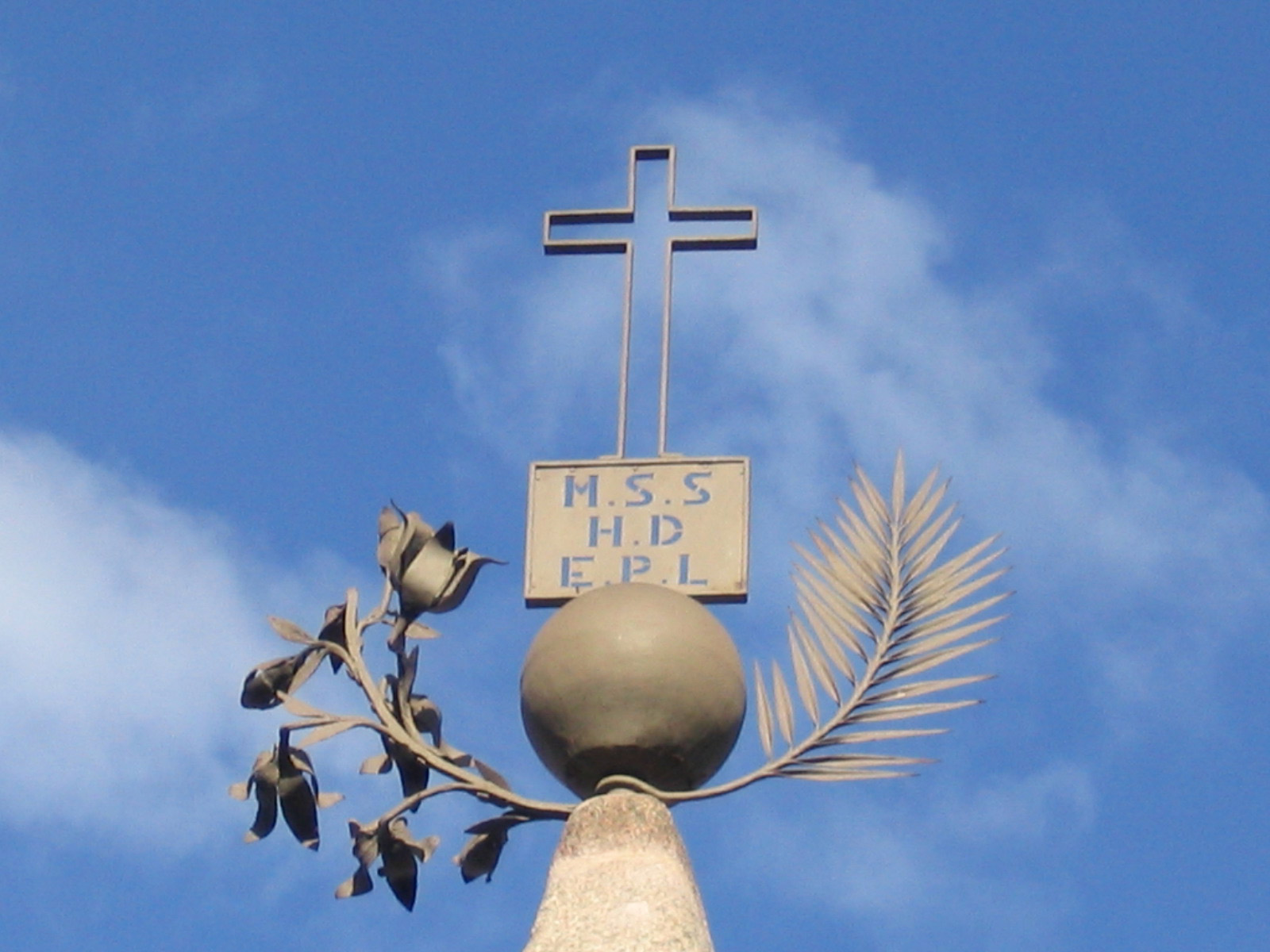
The inscription on the top of the obelisk

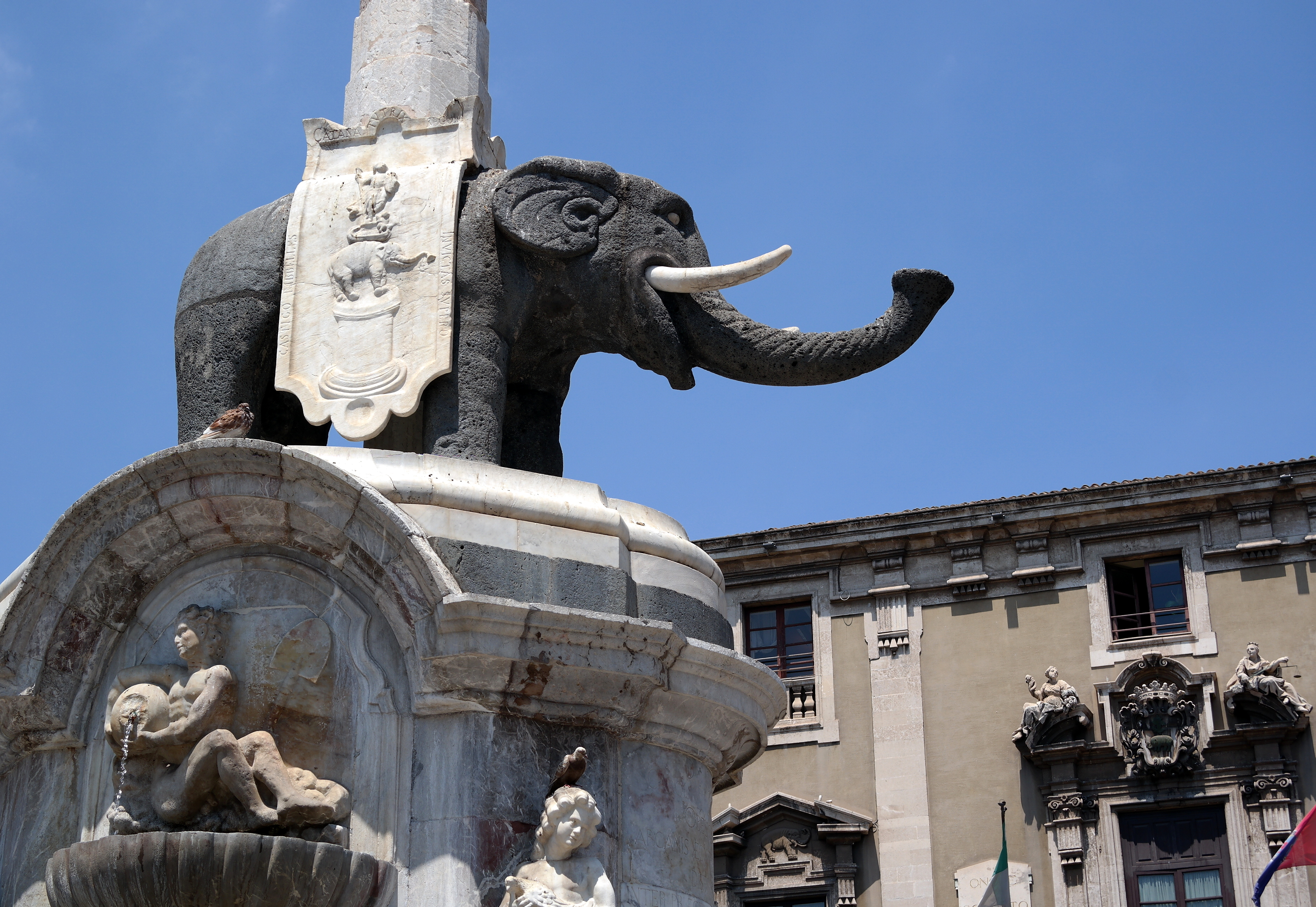
The Elephant Statue

Until 1737 Vaccarini worked to build the fountain, which was later completed with the Egyptian obelisk and the Agatine inscription. In 1757 it was renovated for the first time to add a basin. In 1826 the fountain was circumscribed by an iron fence, within which a small garden was made. Shortly after the unification of Italy, a decision was made to move the fountain from Piazza del Duomo to Piazza Palestro: on May 30, 1862, however, Bonaventura Gravina organized a popular uprising that blocked the move.

There were two restorations carried out during the 20th century: in 1905 a second pool was built, and in 1998 the gate and garden were removed so that today it is possible to sit on some steps at the foot of the base.

== U Liotru ==
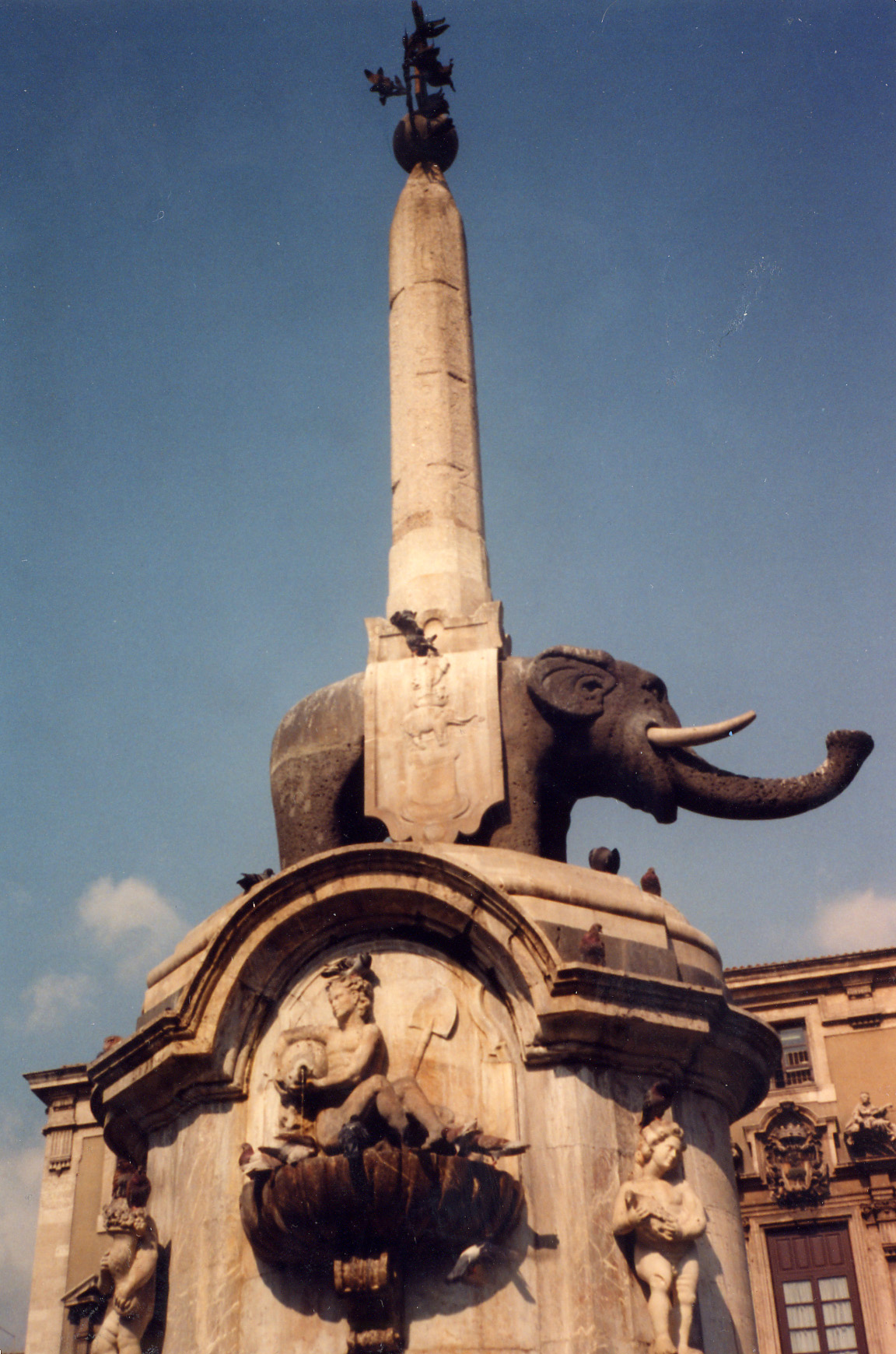
The fountain

=== The myth ===
U Liotru (also called, more rarely, Diotru) owes its appellation to the mispronunciation of the name Heliodorus. The latter, according to popular legends, was a nobleman from Catania who allegedly tried unsuccessfully to become bishop of the diocese. Having fallen from grace, he is said to have become an apostate and to have been considered a "disciple of the Jews, a necromancer and a smith of idols." He would oppose Bishop Leo II the Thaumaturge, who would then condemn him to be burned alive in the Forum Achelles. This phantom character was linked to the elephant because a legend said that he was its sculptor and even used to ride it to travel from Catania to Constantinople. Also according to the legend, Bishop Leo allegedly had the statue taken outside the walls so that it would be forgotten, but the people would still give it divine honors. However, all the adventures of such Heliodorus and related connection with the stone elephant are to be considered mere invention.

Contrary to the fanciful versions of not only popular vulgate, the statue of the elephant symbolizing the City of Catania is the gnomon of the sundial placed in the center of Piazza Duomo. The monument is a measurer of time by sunlight and is therefore "heliotric", which in the Catania dialect has become liotru. After the 1693 earthquake, the reconstruction of Catania coincided with the period of greatest diffusion of sundials in Sicily and other parts of southern Italy. Carlo Maria Carafa, prince of Butera, is considered the most illustrious "gnomonist", that is, an expert in the construction of illustrious sundials, of that period. It is not possible that he participated in the construction of the Catanese sundial in Piazza Duomo. According to the late 18th-century traveler Jean Houel, "the obelisk is Egyptian; it is made of granite and covered with hieroglyphics. According to a widespread notion in Catania, it was placed in a public square so that it would serve as a stylus, or gnomon, to tell the time by its shadow cast on a dial drawn on the ground."

=== The origin ===
There is no certain data on when and by whom the elephant statue was made. Over the centuries, various scholars have tried to answer this question, in some cases even drawing on myth. The latter include Pietro Carrera, who wrote in 1639 that the liotru commemorated a victory in a war between the Catanese and the Libyans. However, the story, which the painter Giuseppe Sciuti immortalized in the great historical curtain of the Teatro Massimo Bellini, is totally fictional.

More likely are the theories conceived by Ignatius II Paternò Castello, Santi Consoli, and Matteo Gaudioso. The former claimed that the elephant came from a circus (it would later be ascertained that it was actually the obelisk that had been among the attractions of an ancient circus), the latter two that it was a reminder of a religion whose traces are now completely lost.

However, the current accepted interpretation was given by the geographer Idrisi during his trip to Sicily in the 12th century. He reported that the Catanese considered the elephant to be a magical statue, capable of protecting the town from the eruptions of Mount Etna. Also according to the Arab geographer, the statue was built during Carthaginian rule. According to the geographer Idrisi, the elephant statue was made during Carthaginian or Byzantine rule. By the time he visited Catania (12th century), the lava stone elephant was already inside the city walls. It was reportedly brought there by the Benedictines of the monastery of St. Agatha, who placed it under an arch known as di Liodoro. In 1239 the elephant statue was chosen as the symbol of Catania. Some claim that the transfer within the walls took place on this very occasion.

=== The elephant's relationship with the city ===
The connection between Catania and the liotru is very ancient. An ancient legend tells of an elephant that allegedly hunted ferocious animals during the founding of Kατάvη. Under Muslim rule, the city was known as Balad-el-fil or Medinat-el-fil, meaning "city of the elephant."

The Liotru did not become an official symbol of the city until 1239: before then, the city emblem was the effigy of St. George. The Catanese decided to change following a series of uprisings in order to move from being merely the domain of a bishop-count to a state-owned city. After failing in the uprisings of 1195, 1207 and 1221, success came with the official concession signed by Frederick II. The first "official release" of the new symbol occurred at a session of Parliament in Foggia in 1240.
