= Francesco Nagar =

Italian painter

Francesco Nagar (5 May 1861 - ?) was an Italian painter and ceramist, who gravitated towards painting maiolica ceramics.

Nagar was born in Naples. He studied in the Royal Museo Artistico Industriale of Naples, with his teachers, Domenico Morelli, Ignazio Pericci, and Filippo Palizzi. He exhibited work at the Mostre della Promotrice Salvator Rosa of Naples from 1877 to 1897. His first submissions were canvas paintings, mainly of interior or exterior vedute of Naples. For example, a View of the choir of the church of San Severino exhibited in 1879 in Naples, and in 1880 at Turin. In 1877, he exhibited in Naples: Ritorno da Piedigrotta, Il pasto ai polli and a Landscape. In 1883 at Naples, he exhibited Passa tempo viziozo, Il pasto frugale, and il pescatore; and in 1884, Sacro e profano.

By 1888, he was exhibiting paintings on maiolica. In 1888 at Naples, he displayed in maiolica: Arabi and Salve Regina (Copy of a Morelli painting). In 1888 he exhibited the ceramic The Triumph of Science (copy of a painting of Giuseppe Sciuti). He worked for the Ceramica del Museo Artistico Industriale. He completed a tile floor with an apparently random design of spilt rose petals on a grid. Designed by Filippo Palizzi for the Sorrento villa of Russian princess Cortchakroff.
