= Palazzo degli Elefanti =

Historic building in Catania, Italy

Coordinates: 37°30′11″N 15°5′13.1″E

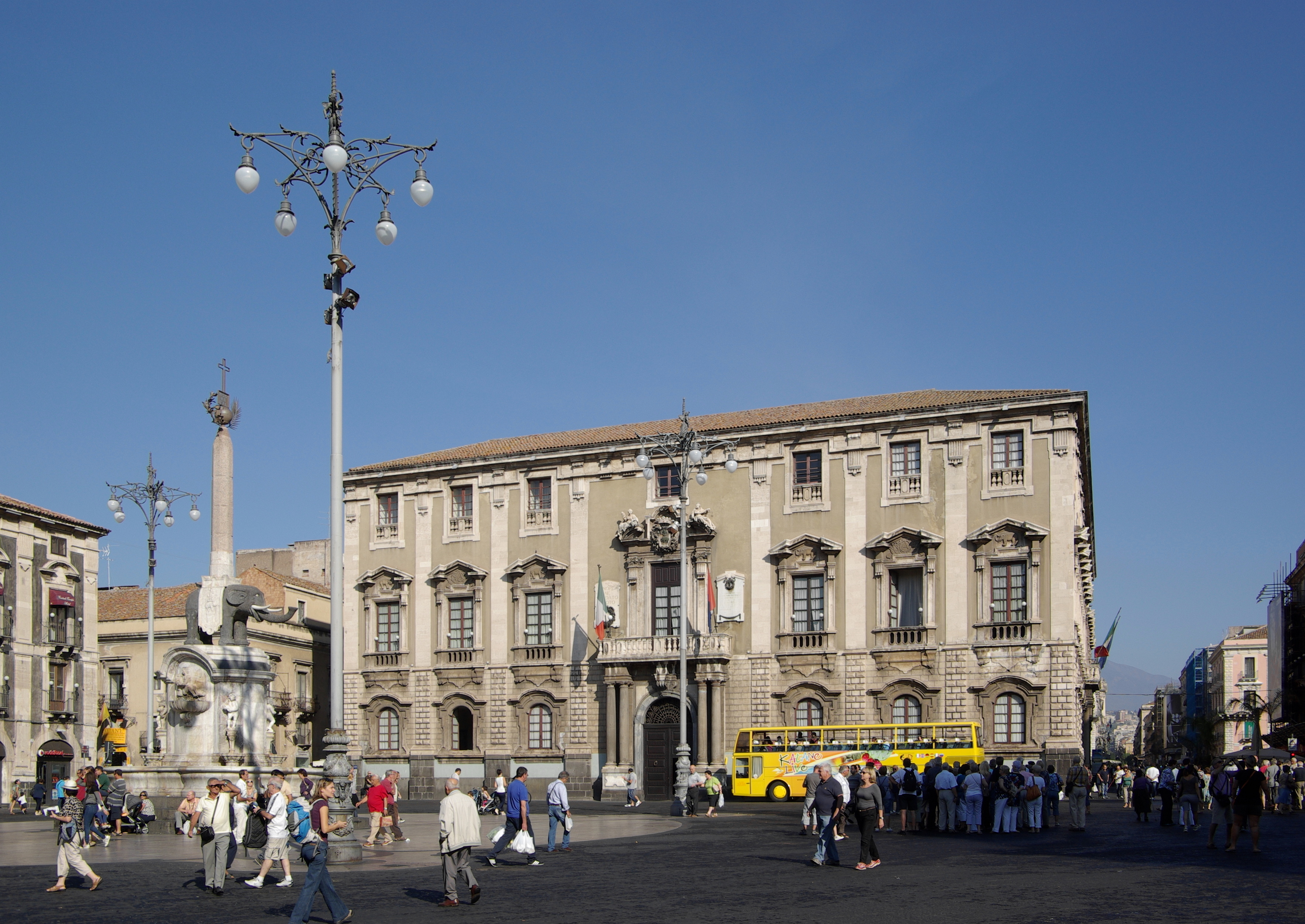
Palazzo degli Elefanti.

Palazzo degli Elefanti (English: "Elephants Palace") is a historical building in Catania, region of Sicily, southern Italy. It currently houses the city's Town Hall. In the past, the prior building was also known as the Palazzo Senatorio or Loggia Senatoria.

== History and description ==
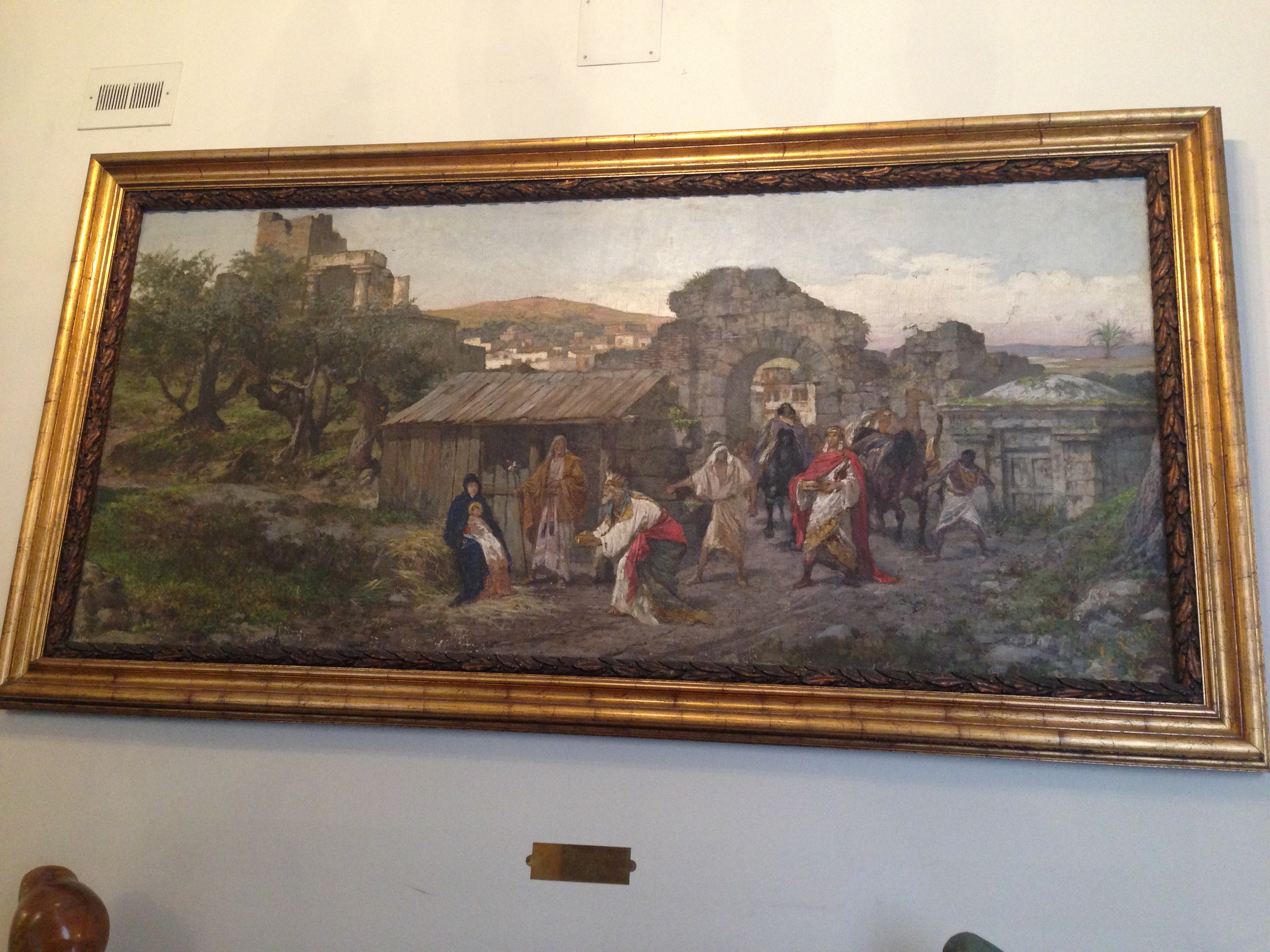
Adoration by the Magi by Sciuti

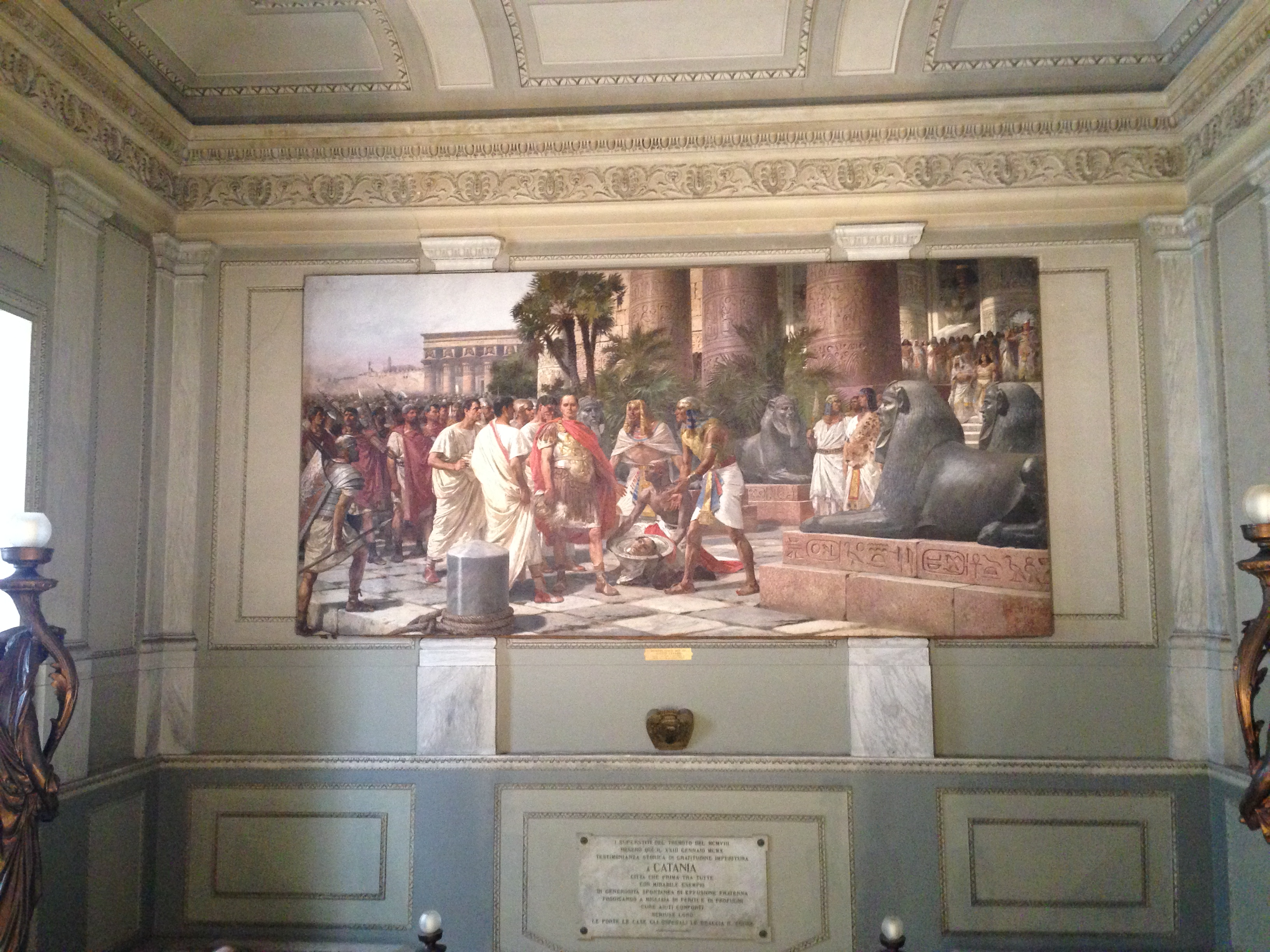
Julius Caesar arrives to Egypt and is presented with the Head of Pompey Magnus by Sciuti

The main facade of the palace, faces the northern side of the rectangular Piazza del Duomo; while across the square, on the southern end stands the Palazzo del Seminario dei Chierici. The Palazzo degli Elefanti was begun in 1696 after the devastating earthquake of 1693. Construction was begun using the designs of Giovanni Battista Longobardo. The eastern, southern, and western façades were however designed at a later stage by Giovan Battista Vaccarini, a highly prolific architect of Catania during its urban reconstruction in the 18th-century, while the northern one was by Carmelo Battaglia.

The staircase opening to the inner court with four porticoes was added in the late 18th century by Stefano Ittar. In the second floor are a series of large historical and one religious oil paintings by the Sicilian artist Giuseppe Sciuti, painted circa 1900.

== Obelisk, elephant, and fountain ==
In 1736 in the center of Piazza del Duomo, Vaccarini erected a fountain with an ancient black lava stone statue of an elephant carrying on its back an Egyptian red granite obelisk, marked with hieroglyphs. It is not known how the obelisk originally came to Catania, but it was suspected to be a decoration of some ancient Roman hippodrome. Until 1620 the obelisk had served as an architrave to an arch at the episcopal palace. In 1677, it had been erected standing (sans elephant) in the courtyard of the Palazzo degli Elefanti, but like nearly everything else in town, it was toppled in 1693. The base of the fountain has two reliefs depicting allegorical images of the two rivers that once coursed through Catania: the Simeto and Amenano. The arrangement by Vaccarini of the Elephant Fountain was almost certainly inspired by Bernini's 1667 Elephant and Obelisk in Rome. The elephant (u Liotru), however, has been for centuries a symbol of the city.

== Sources ==
- Vittorio Consoli, ed. (1987). Enciclopedia di Catania. Catania: Tringale.
