= Piazza del Duomo, Catania =

Main city square in Catania, Italy

Coordinates: 37.5025°N 15.0871°E

Piazza del Duomo is the main city square in Catania, Italy, flanked by both the centers of civic (city hall at Palazzo degli Elefanti) and religious power (Duomo or Cathedral of Saint Agatha).

== The square ==
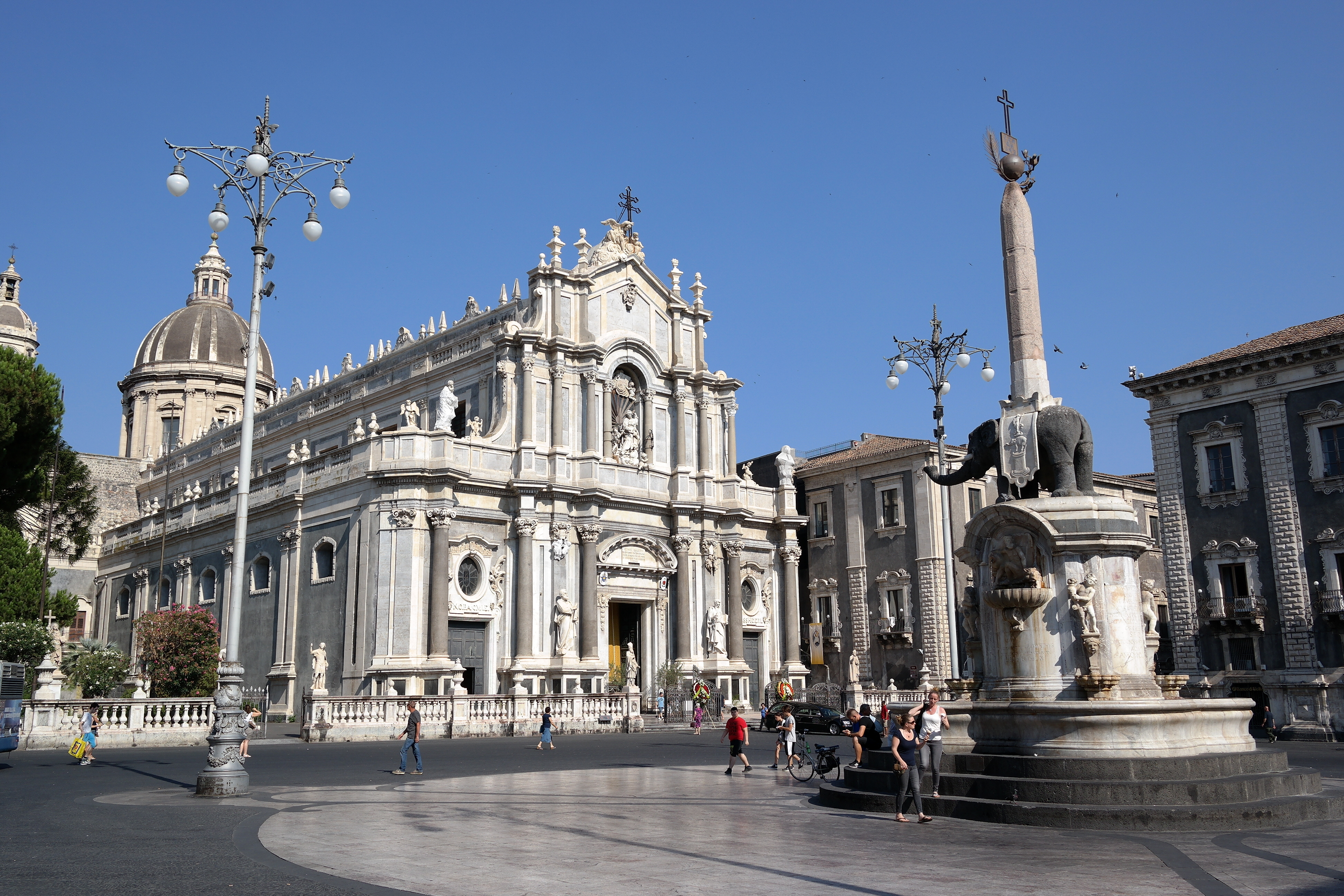
Piazza del Duomo

The Duomo di Catania or Cattedrale di Sant'Agata stands on the east side of the square. Originally constructed in 1078–1093, on the ruins of an ancient Roman Thermae (Achillean Baths), like nearly all of Catania, the devastating 1693 earthquake, leveled most of the structure, and Giovanni Battista Vaccarini designed a Baroque structure and façade in 1711.

Three streets enter the square: via Etnea, the historical Cardo maximus or north–south artery of the Ancient Roman City; the via Giuseppe Garibaldi, and the via Vittorio Emanuele II that crosses it from east to west.

On the north side is the Palazzo degli Elefanti or the Town Hall. In front of this building stands a fountain designed by Vaccarini, consisting of an obelisk on the back of an elephant (u Liotru), now the symbol of Catania.

On the other side of the square, there is the Amenano fountain, in front of the Palazzo dei Chierici. Between the Chierici palace and the cathedral is the Porta Uzeda. From the terraces you can admire two splendid panoramas: to the north, the Piazza del Duomo in Catania with the Elephant fountain and Via Etnea with Mount Etna in the background; towards the port, the walls of Charles V, with the arches of the Marina up to the Ursino castle. The portal of the Gate of Charles V is part of the only remaining part of the medieval city walls.

Access to the baths by accessing the Diocesan Museum of Catania: a barrel-vaulted corridor built into the gap between the Roman structures and the foundations of the cathedral (whose access consists of a short flight of steps at different times to the left of the façade) allows to take a trip into the bowels of the city, where the Amenano river flows, whose waters rise to the surface in the nearby Amenano fountain in the square in front. The name of the plant is deduced from an inscription on a marble slab of the Lunense area reduced to six very fragmented main fragments, probably dating back to the first half of the 5th century, now exhibited in the Civic Museum at Castello Ursino.

== Festival celebrations ==
The Piazza del Duomo is a focal point for the annual Festival of Saint Agatha, a three-day event that begins on February 3 with a procession known as “della luminaria”, from the church of Sant'Agata alla Fornace to the Cathedral here. This is followed by an evening outdoor concert and fireworks.
