= Castello Scammacca =

Palace

Coordinates: 37°36′10″N 15°09′51″E

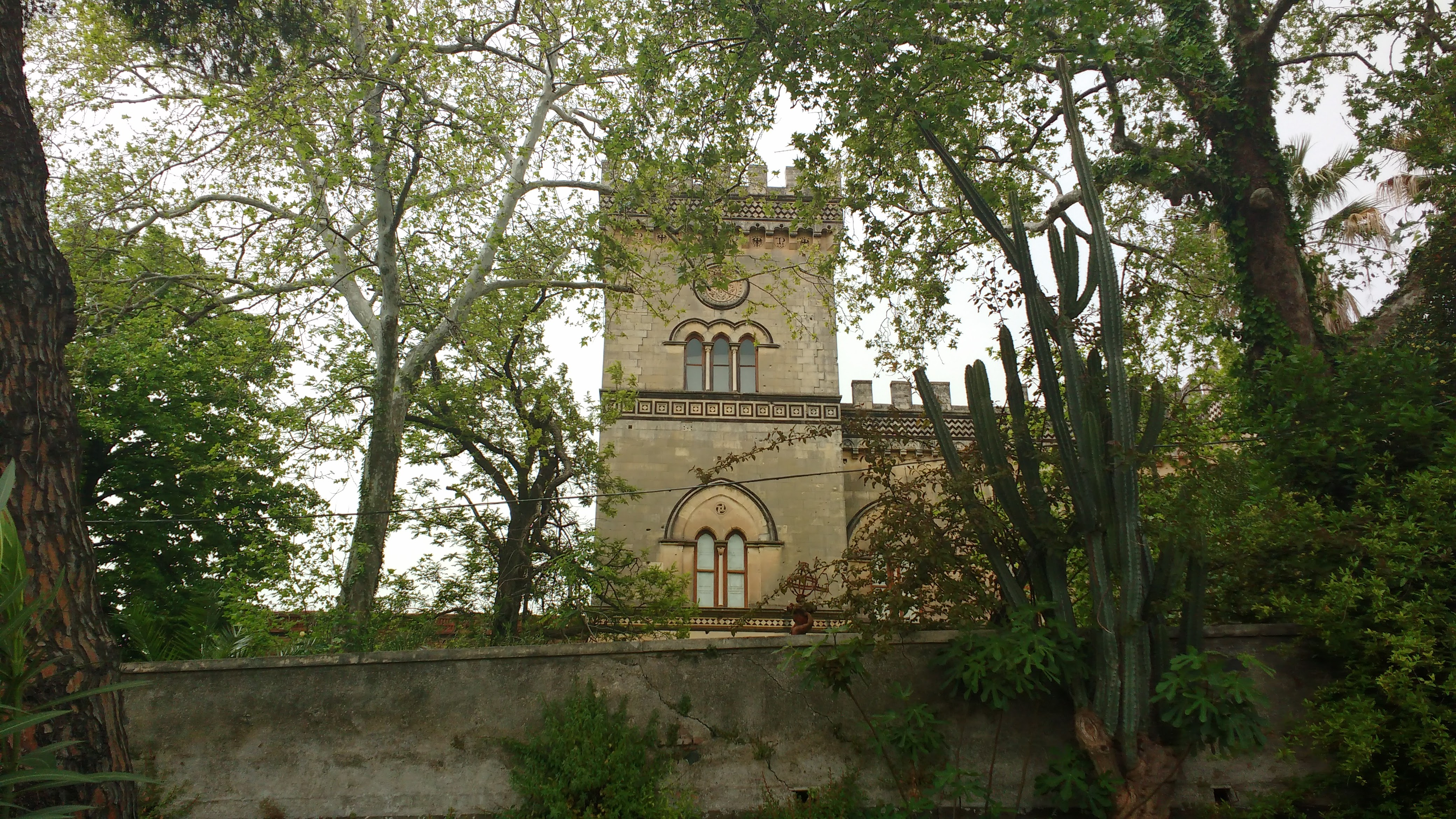
View of tower of villa

The Castello Scammacca, also known as the Castello Pennisi di Floristella, is a 19th-century villa-like palace, built to resemble anachronistically a Gothic-style castle with crenellated rooflines, located on piazza Agostino Pennisi #11 (between Via dell'Agrumicoltura and Via San Girolamo), in a large plot of land in the outskirts of Acireale, Sicily, Italy. The building is privately owned, but generally unoccupied.

The house is named after the original owners of the terrain, the barons of Scammacca. The palace was commissioned in the late 19th century by the Baron Agostino Pennisi di Floristella; the design was by the architect Giuseppe Patricolo. Work was generally complete by 1882. Of note, the private chapel was frescoed in 1905 by Giuseppe Sciuti. The villa was requisitioned at the start of World War II by the German army. Allied bombardment failed to damage it significantly. With the allied occupation of Sicily, the castle was occupied by the British army.
