= Heliodorus of Catania =

Heliodorus of Catania (Sicilian: Liotru, pronounced [lɪˈɔːʈɽʊ]; Italian: Eliodoro, pronounced [eljoˈdɔːro]; died 778 in Catania) is a semi-legendary persona accused by his contemporaries of being a necromancer practicing witchcraft.

Son of a noble Sicilian family, he was originally a Christian, and was even a candidate to assume the diocese of Catania. In that period the Etnean City came under the jurisdiction of the Eastern Roman Empire governed by then-Emperor Leo III the Isaurian.

Having failed to attain the office of bishop, conferred instead on an archdeacon from Ravenna named Leo, he apostatized from the faith and began to practice magic and sorcery.

Besides the accusation of necromancy, Heliodorus was pointed to as an idolmaker and "a disciple of the Jews". He remained a vocal opponent of Saint Leo Thaumaturgus, who led the church of Catania as bishop from A.D. 765 to 785.

The Elephant Fountain in Catania is popularly known in Sicilian as u Liotru, after a legend involving Heliodorus.

== Portrayals ==
- Giuseppe Platania (Palermo 1780-1852) - Saint Leo and the burning Heliodorus (Museum of Castello Ursino - Catania)
- Matteo Desiderato (XVIII-XIX) - Saint Leo overcomes Heliodorus (Mother Church of Santa Maria di Licodìa - Province of Catania)
- Painting with Saint Leo and Heliodorus (Parishional Church of Saint Leo - Saracena - Province of Cosenza)
- Mural artistic creation - Saint Leo, Heliodorus and the pyre & the Unscathed Saint Leo (Parishional Church of Saint Leo - Saracena - Province of Cosenza)
