= Palazzo del Seminario dei Chierici =

Coordinates: 37.5020°N 15.0873°E

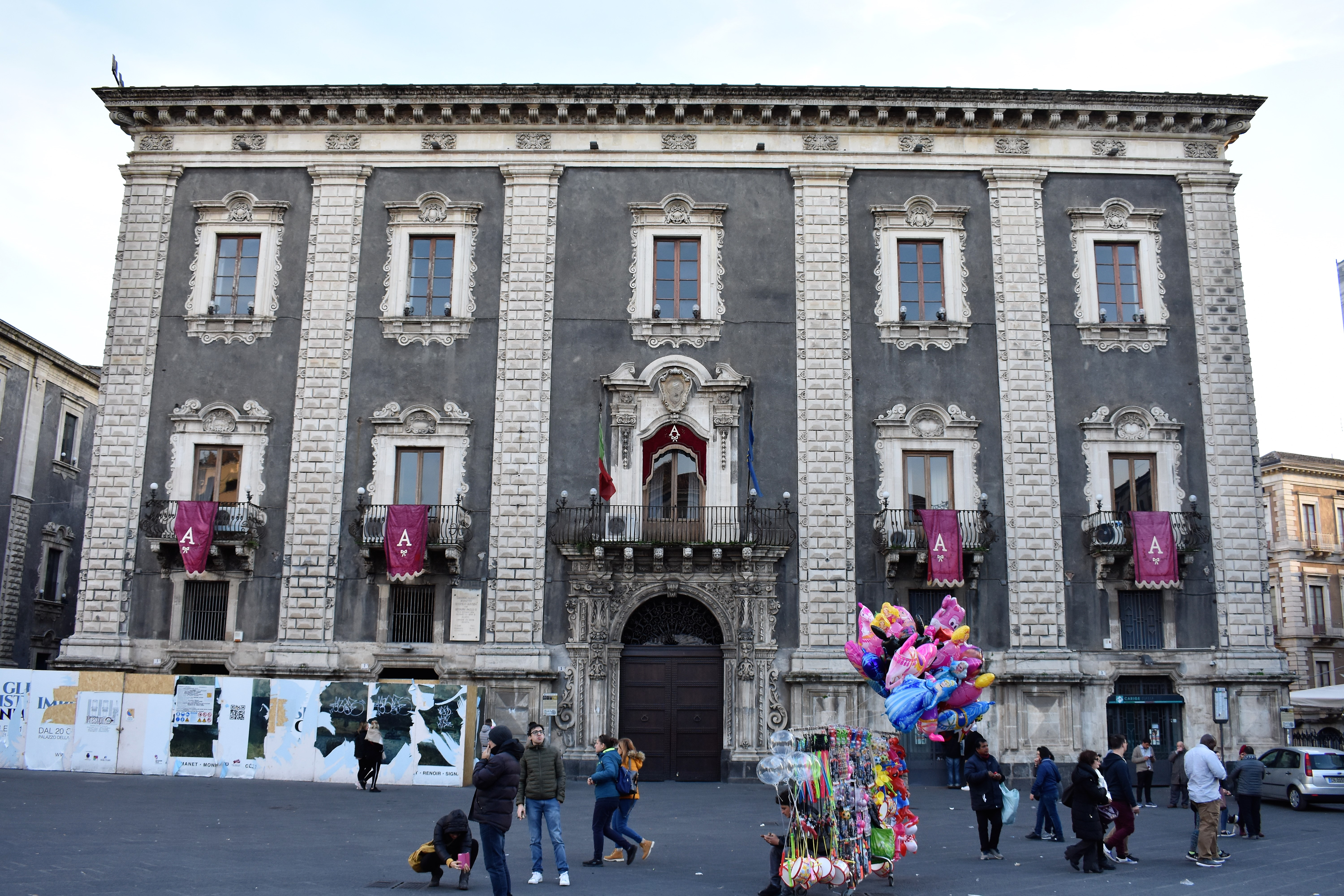
Facade from Piazza del Duomo

The Palazzo del Seminario dei Chierici (Palace of the Seminary of the Clerics), also known as the Palazzo dei Chierici, is a monumental building located facing the piazza Duomo in Catania, region of Sicily, Italy. It stands aside from the Cathedral of Sant'Agata, and across the piazza from the Palazzo degli Elefanti, which houses city hall. Between these two palaces, the Monument of the Elephant with obelisk is located.

== History ==
In this period a building for training clerics existed adjacent to a Benedictine Monastery in this area, built against the medieval walls of Catania.

In 1572, archbishop of Catania, Antonio Faraone, founded a formal seminary, which by 1614 was located in a building here, facing the Senatorial building located where the present Palazzo degli Elefanti rises. The building was incorporated into the Porta Uzeda, which was an opening in the Walls of Charles V. The building was partially damaged during the 29 May 1647 revolt against Spanish authorities.

Ultimately, this structure was razed by the 1693 earthquake that devastated the city. Reconstruction was soon begun under the architect Alonzo di Benedetto, and continued in 1757 by Francesco Battaglia. In 1757, the institution received a large endowment by Salvatore Ventimiglia, prince of Belmonte, and vicar general to Sicily, which allowed the seminary to grant professors of classical languages, theology, philosophy, mathematics and natural sciences as well as the addition of a publishing house.

During the 19th century, many of the buildings here were occupied by a military barracks, restricting the seminary to the Southern wing of the building. A third floor was added by architect Mario Di Stefano in 1866.

The seminary building suffered during the bombardments of World War II, prompting the construction of a new seminary at San Giovanni la Punta, completed on 15 August 1951. This building was acquired by the offices of the Comune, and used for offices of the mayoralty. Today it still houses the offices of the treasurer of the city, as well as the Museo diocesano di Catania (Museum of the Diocese).

== Description ==
Like the Palazzo Tezzano found in Piazza Stesicoro, this palace has the distinct contrast between the white stone from Ipsica, and a dark plaster colored with volcanic sand. The large window, framed with elaborate decorations and balconies are characteristic of the Baroque architecture of Catania.

== Bibliography ==
- Ferrara, Francesco (1829). Storia di Catania sino alla fine del secolo XVIII. Catania.
- Curated by Vittorio Consoli. Enciclopedia di Catania. Catania, Tringale, 1987.
- Derived from Italian Wikipedia entry
