= Elephant and Obelisk =

Ancient Egyptian obelisk on a marble elephant, a landmark of Rome, Italy

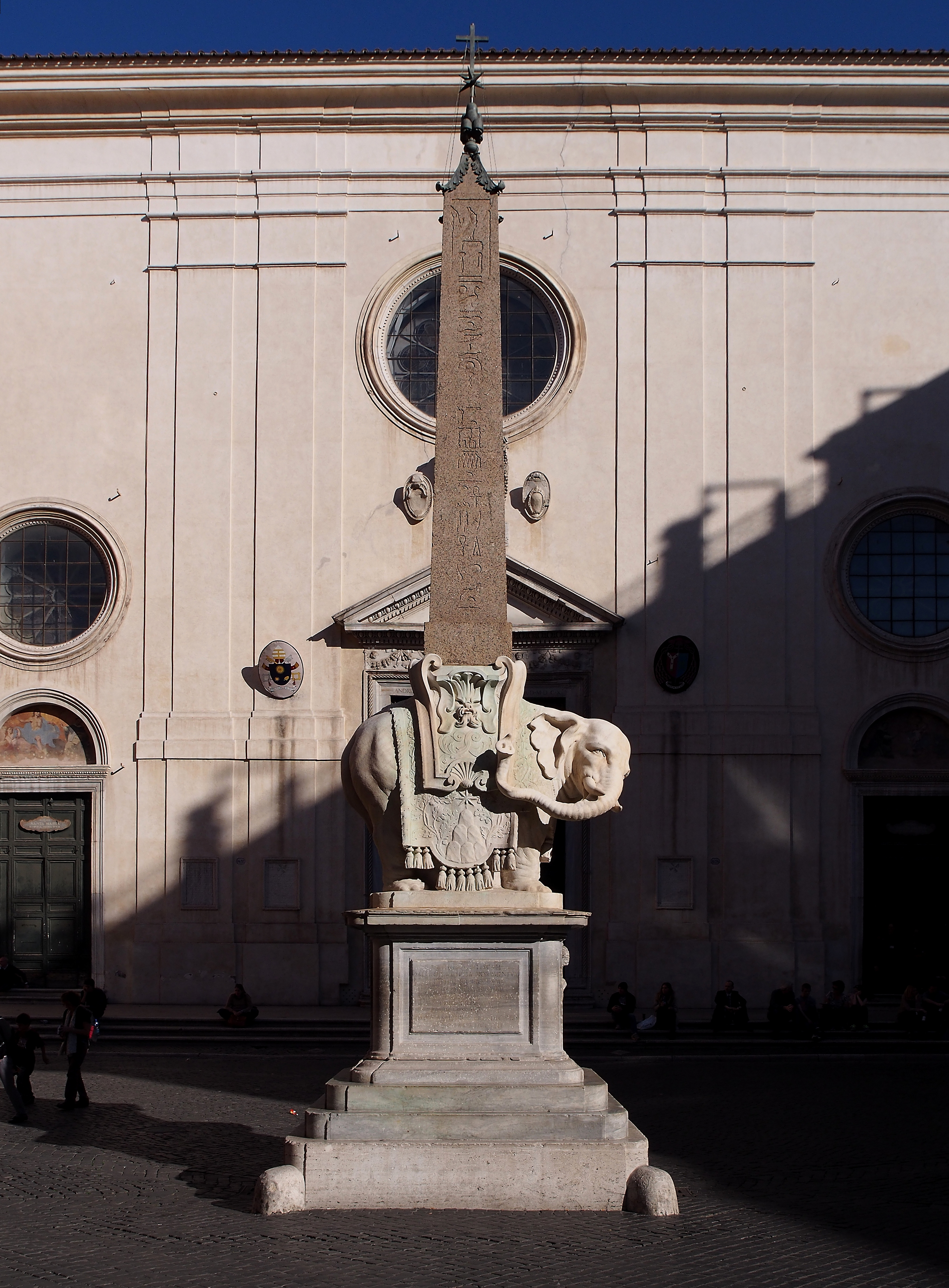
- Minerveo obelisk by Bernini from 1667
- Click on the map for a fullscreen view
- Artist: Gian Lorenzo Bernini
- Year: 1667
- Catalogue: 71
- Type: Sculpture
- Medium: Marble
- Subject: Elephant
- Location: Piazza della Minerva; Rome; 41°53′52.74″N 12°28′39.26″E
- Preceded by: Bust of Louis XIV (Bernini)
- Followed by: Angel with the Crown of Thorns

Elephant and Obelisk is a statue of an elephant carrying an obelisk, designed by the Italian artist Gian Lorenzo Bernini. It was unveiled in 1667 in the Piazza della Minerva in Rome, adjacent to the church of Santa Maria sopra Minerva, where it stands today.

== The obelisk ==
The red granite obelisk was originally erected by Pharaoh Apries of the Twenty-sixth Dynasty of Egypt, about 580 BC, in his capital Sais. The obelisk was rediscovered in 1665 during excavations near the church of Santa Maria sopra Minerva. It had probably been brought to Rome in the first century AD for the temple to the Egyptian goddess Isis that was located there. The obelisk is 5.47 meters tall and is the smallest of the 13 ancient obelisks present in Rome. Together with pedestal and elephant, the statue stands 12.69 meters tall.

The obelisk is considered to be one of a pair; the other is in Urbino.

== The elephant statue ==
The image possibly originated from the Hypnerotomachia Polyphili of 1499. Various preparatory drawings done by Bernini exist. One version in Windsor Castle, UK was probably done in the 1630s when Cardinal Francesco Barberini wished to place an Egyptian obelisk in front of his family palace, the Palazzo Barberini. Nothing came of this specific project, but Bernini revived the idea in the 1660s, when Pope Alexander VII, Fabio Chigi, wished to build a similar monument after another Egyptian obelisk had been discovered in Rome.

Various other concepts were explored for this later commission as attested by preparatory drawings. It is likely that the drawings were used so that the patron could make a decision about which design he wanted. This included a drawing (in Leipzig) of the figure of Time holding a scythe and simultaneously the obelisk. In the Vatican Library there are two pen and ink drawings with other figures holding up the obelisk, including one of Hercules, and another with various allegorical figures supporting the spire. A third version in the Vatican Library shows Bernini adapting on the concept he created in the 1630s, although he added in a larger base, changed the direction of the elephant's orientation, and made its face appear more friendly than ferocious.

The marble elephant was probably carved by Bernini's assistant Ercole Ferrata.

The Latin inscription at one side of the pedestal reads: "Let any beholder of the carved images of the wisdom of Egypt on the obelisk carried by the elephant, the strongest of beasts, realize that it takes a robust mind to carry solid wisdom."

The statue turned out to be the last commission Pope Alexander VII would ask of Bernini, as the pope died in May 1667. He was succeeded by Pope Clement IX.

== In later times ==
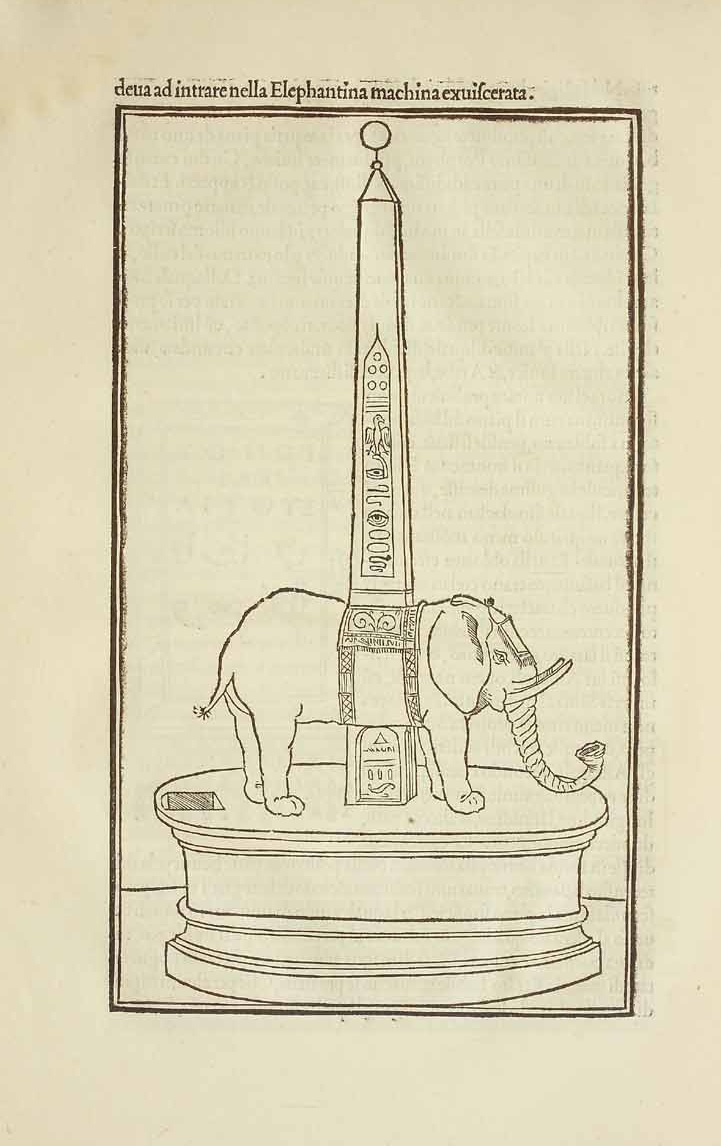
Wood cut from Hypnerotomachia Poliphili

A similar statue of an elephant carrying an obelisk was erected by Vaccarini in 1736 in front of the Palazzo degli Elefanti in Catania on Sicily.

The statue makes a brief but prominent appearance in the Italian neorealist film Umberto D. (1952). It also features as a motif in the novel Adua by Igiaba Scego (2015).

On 15 November 2016, Rome authorities announced they were searching for vandals who broke the left tusk the previous Sunday night and left the piece nearby. Mayor Virginia Raggi said that they will assess the damage to determine how to best reattach the fragment.

Salvador Dalí's painting The Elephants, which depicts two elephants with elongated legs facing each other while bearing fragmented obelisks, also makes visual references to the statue.

== Gallery ==
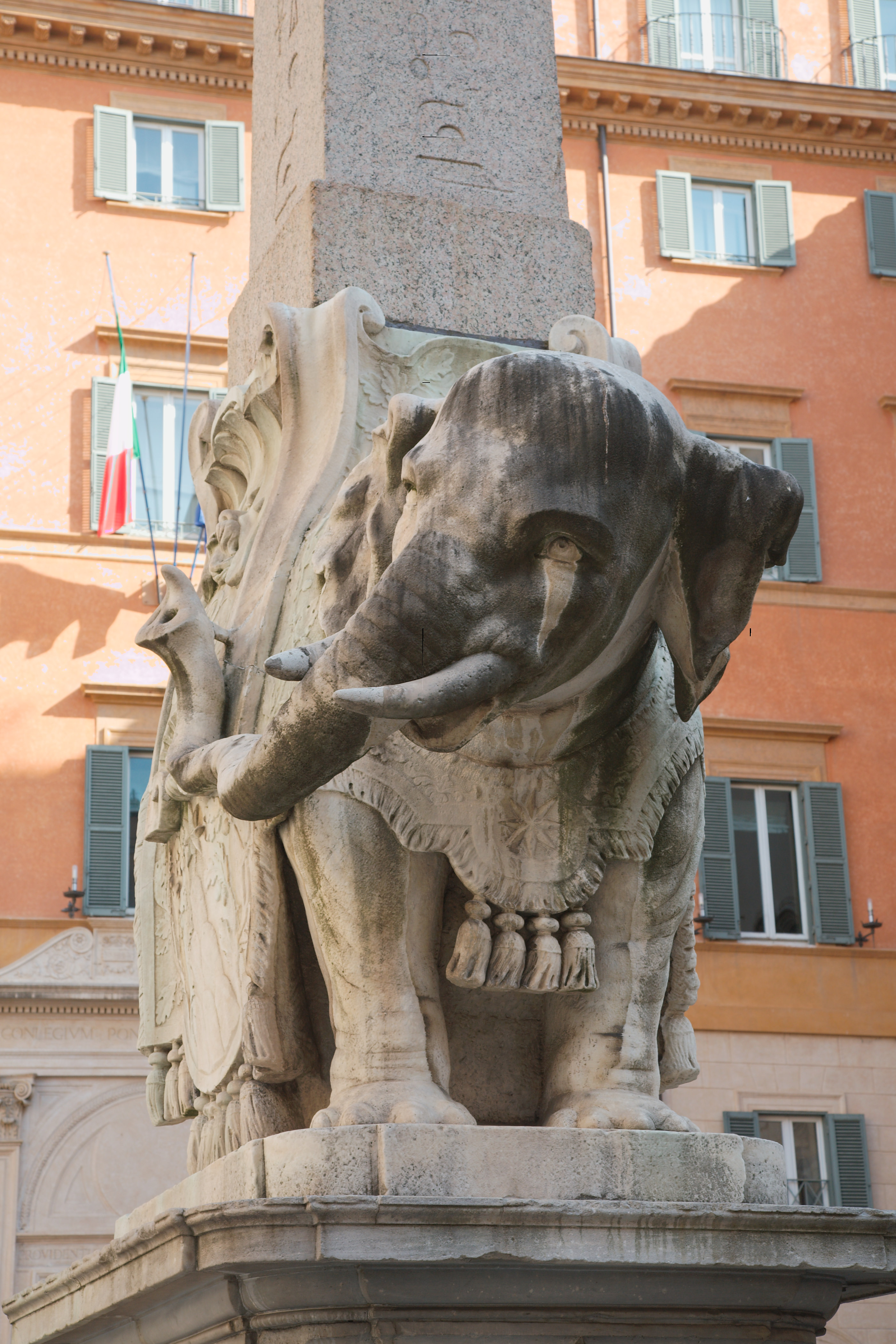
Three-quarter view

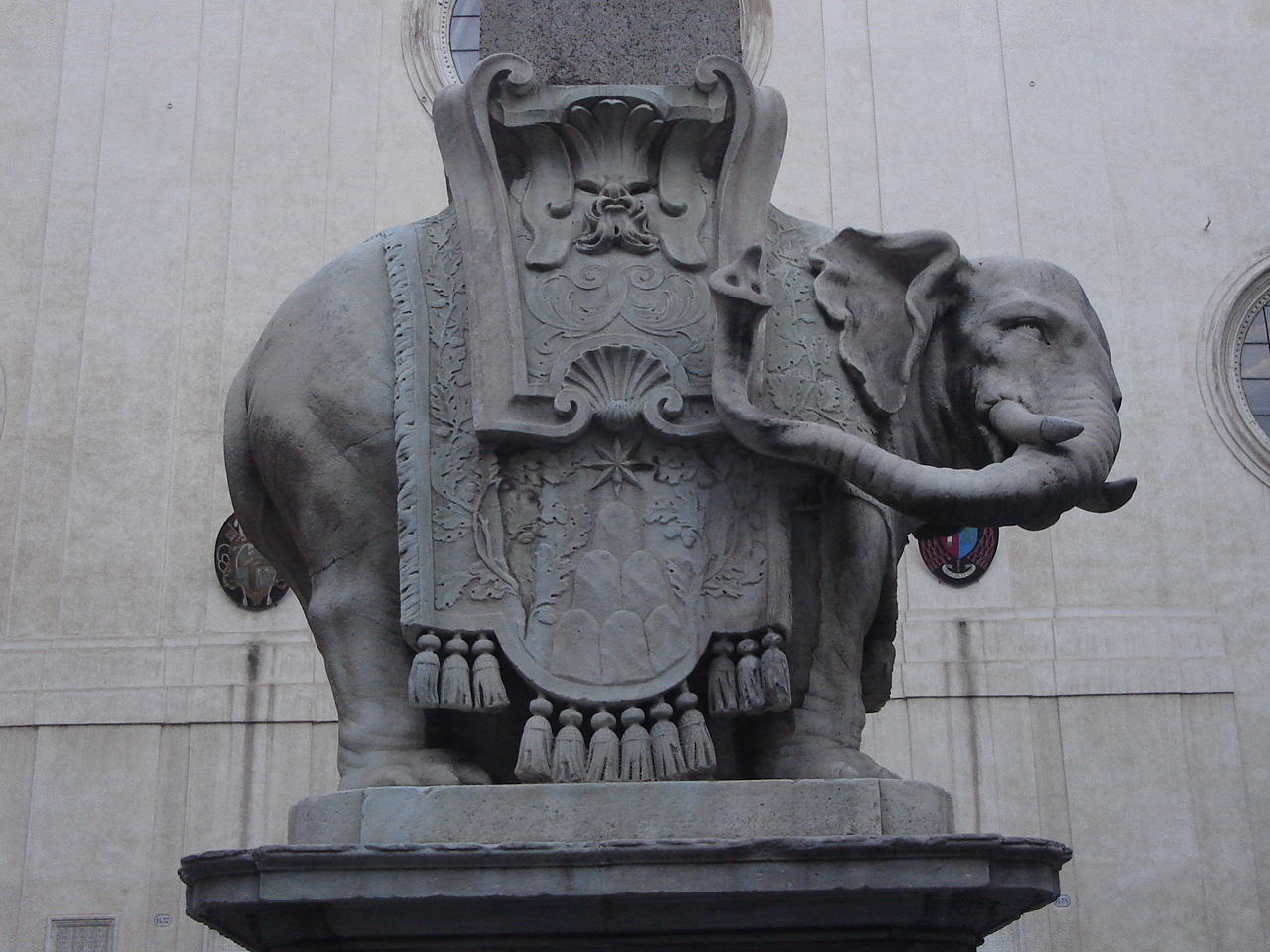
Close-up view from the west

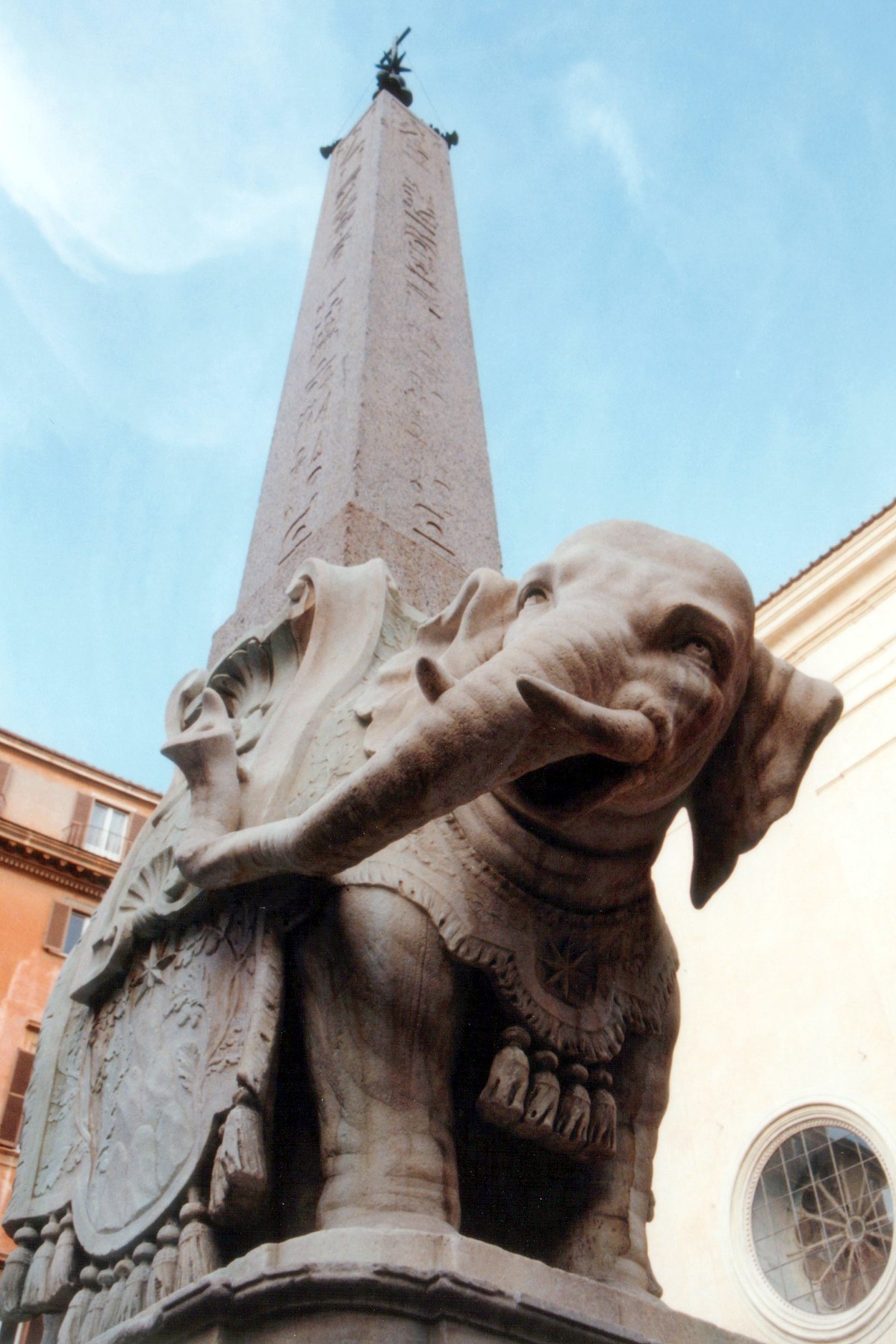
View from below

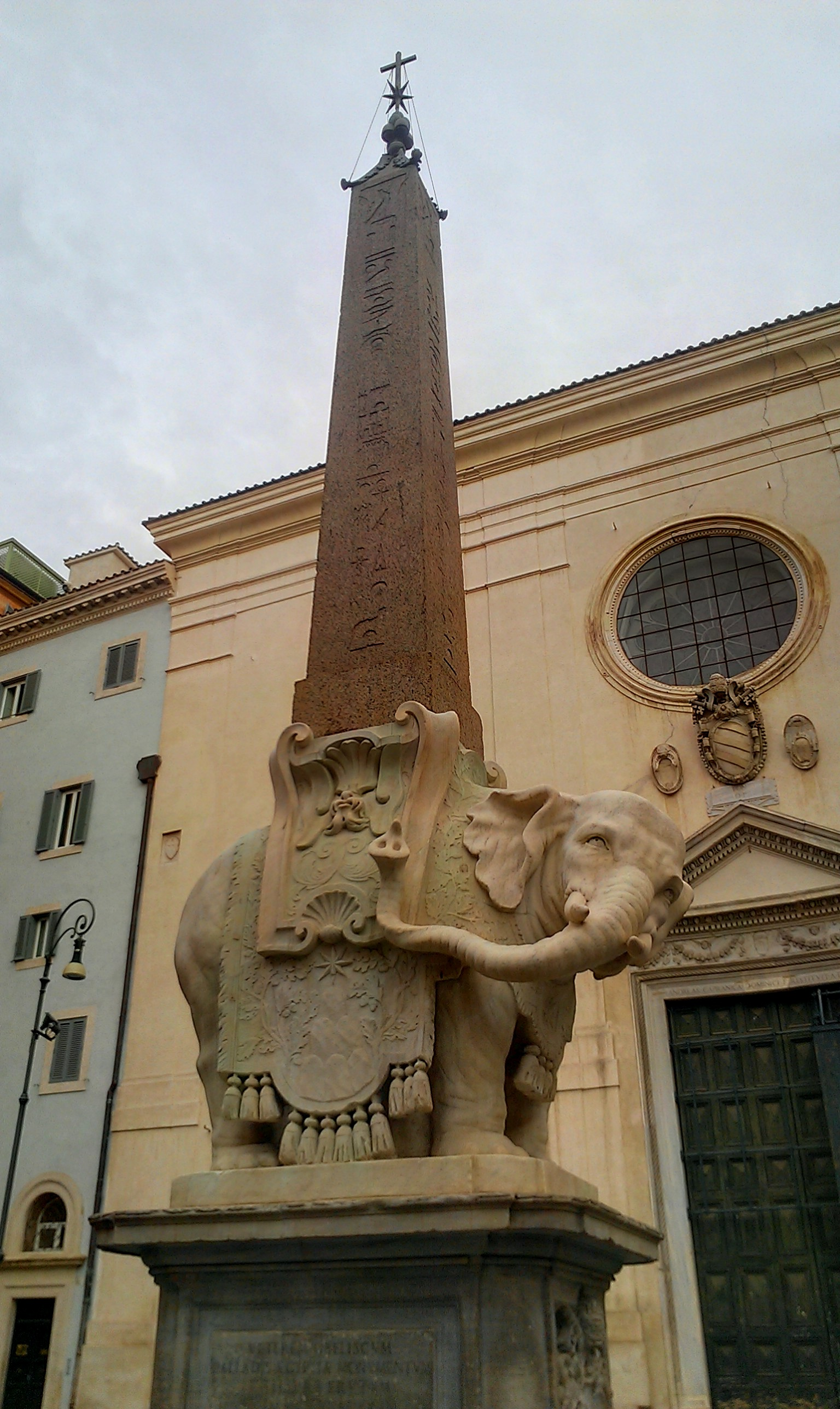
Obelisk at the Piazza della Minerva, Rome.

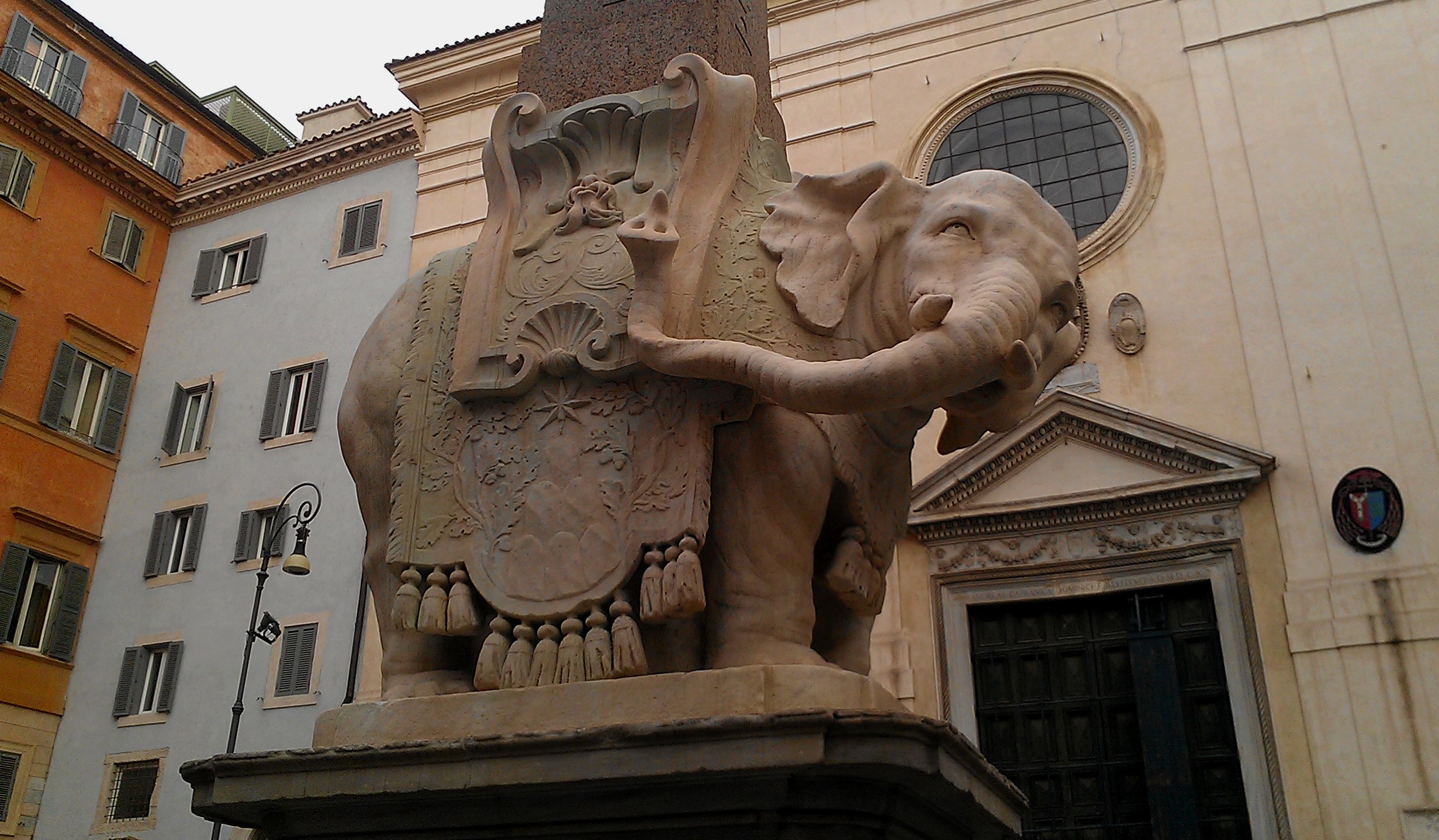
Elephant at the Piazza della Minerva, Rome.

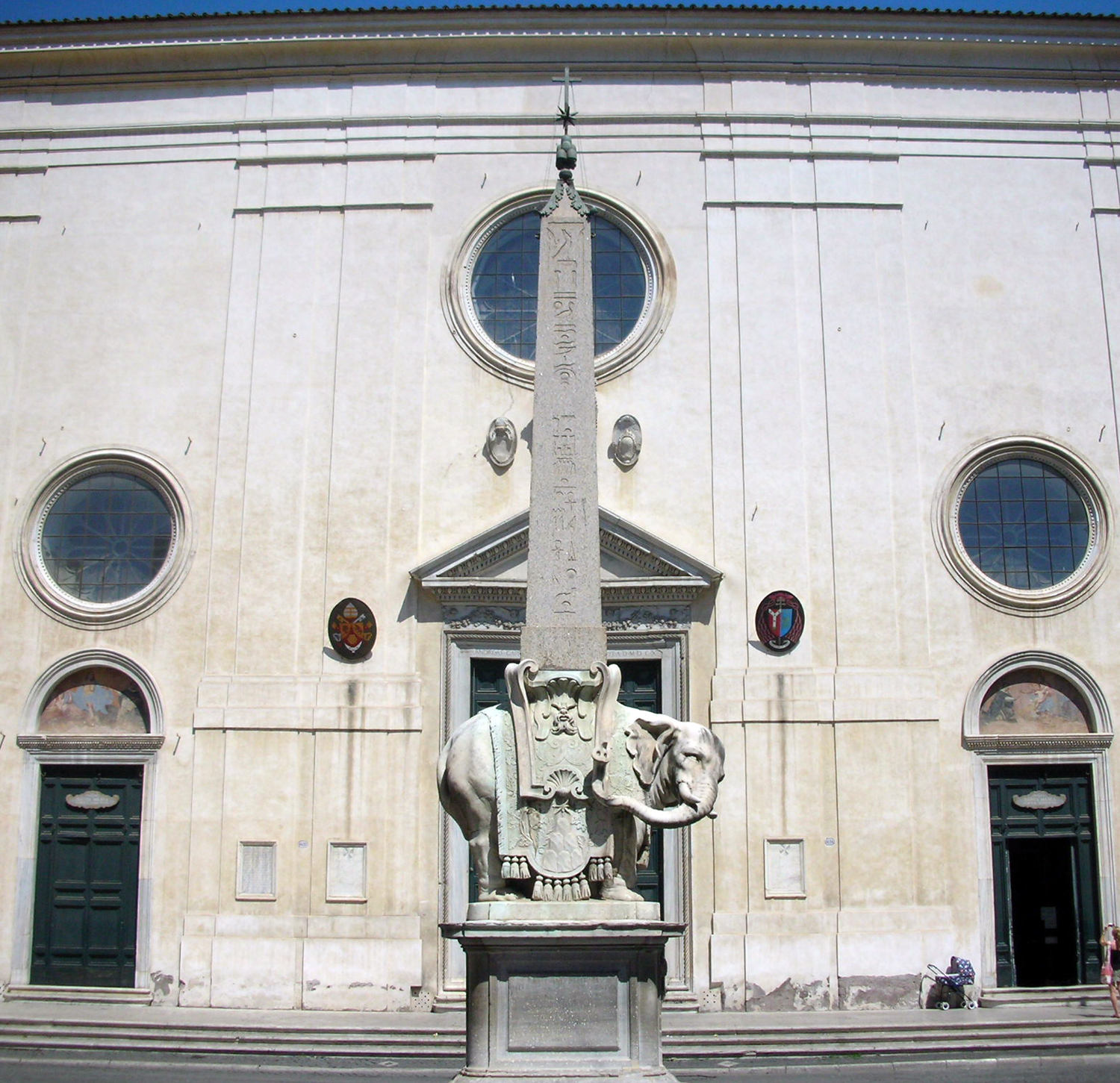
View against the façade of Santa Maria sopra Minerva

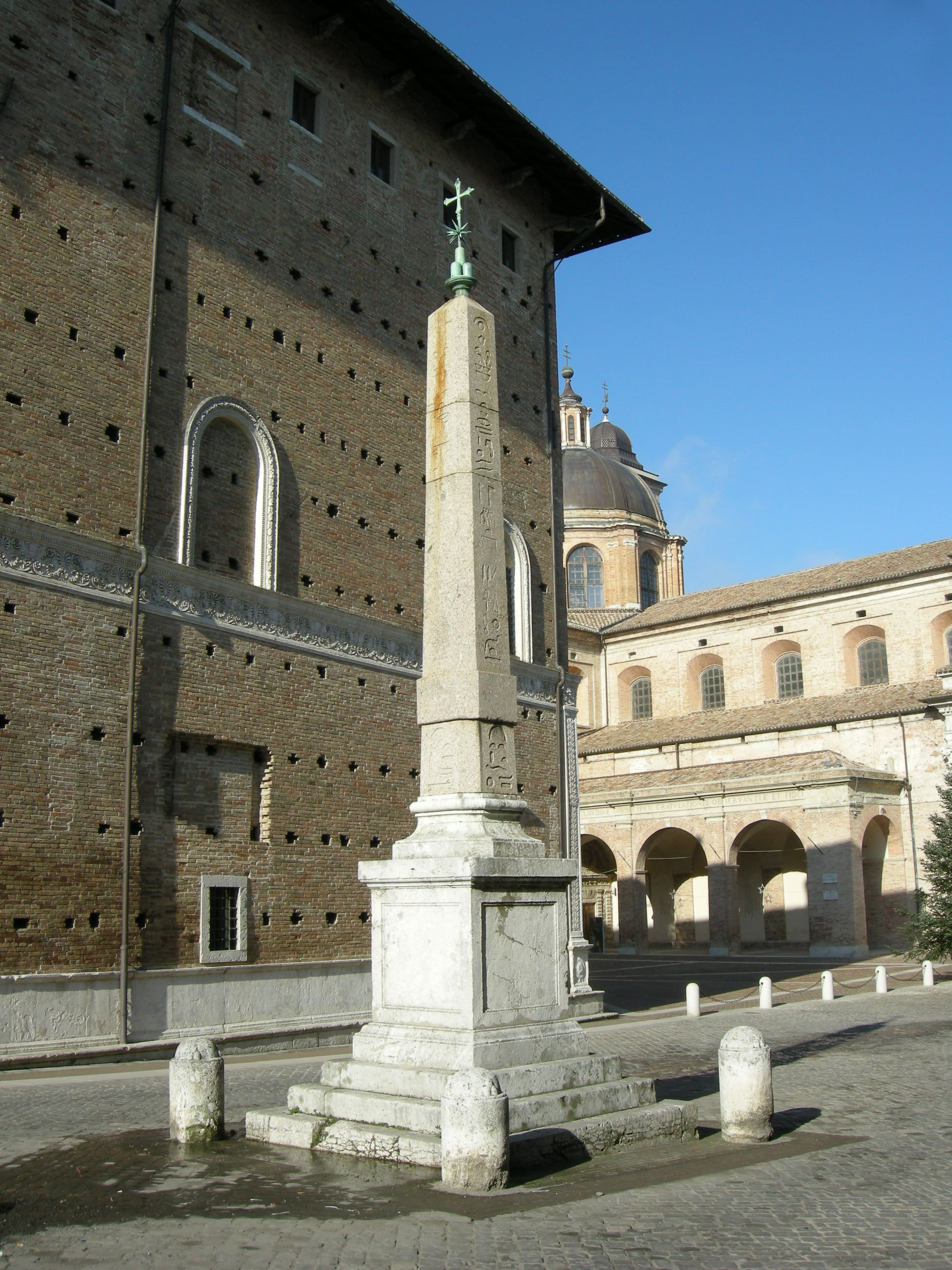
The second Obelisk [of the pair of the Elephant and Obelisk], Urbino

== See also ==
- Apries – Egyptian pharaoh
- Obelisk of Montecitorio – Ancient Egyptian obelisk, a landmark of Rome, Italy
- Sais – Ancient Egyptian city
- List of Egyptian obelisks
- List of obelisks in Rome
- List of works by Gian Lorenzo Bernini

Preceded by Flaminio Obelisk	Landmarks of Rome; Elephant and Obelisk	Succeeded by Obelisk of Montecitorio
