= Piazza della Minerva =

Square in Rome, Italy

- City square
- {{{other_names}}}
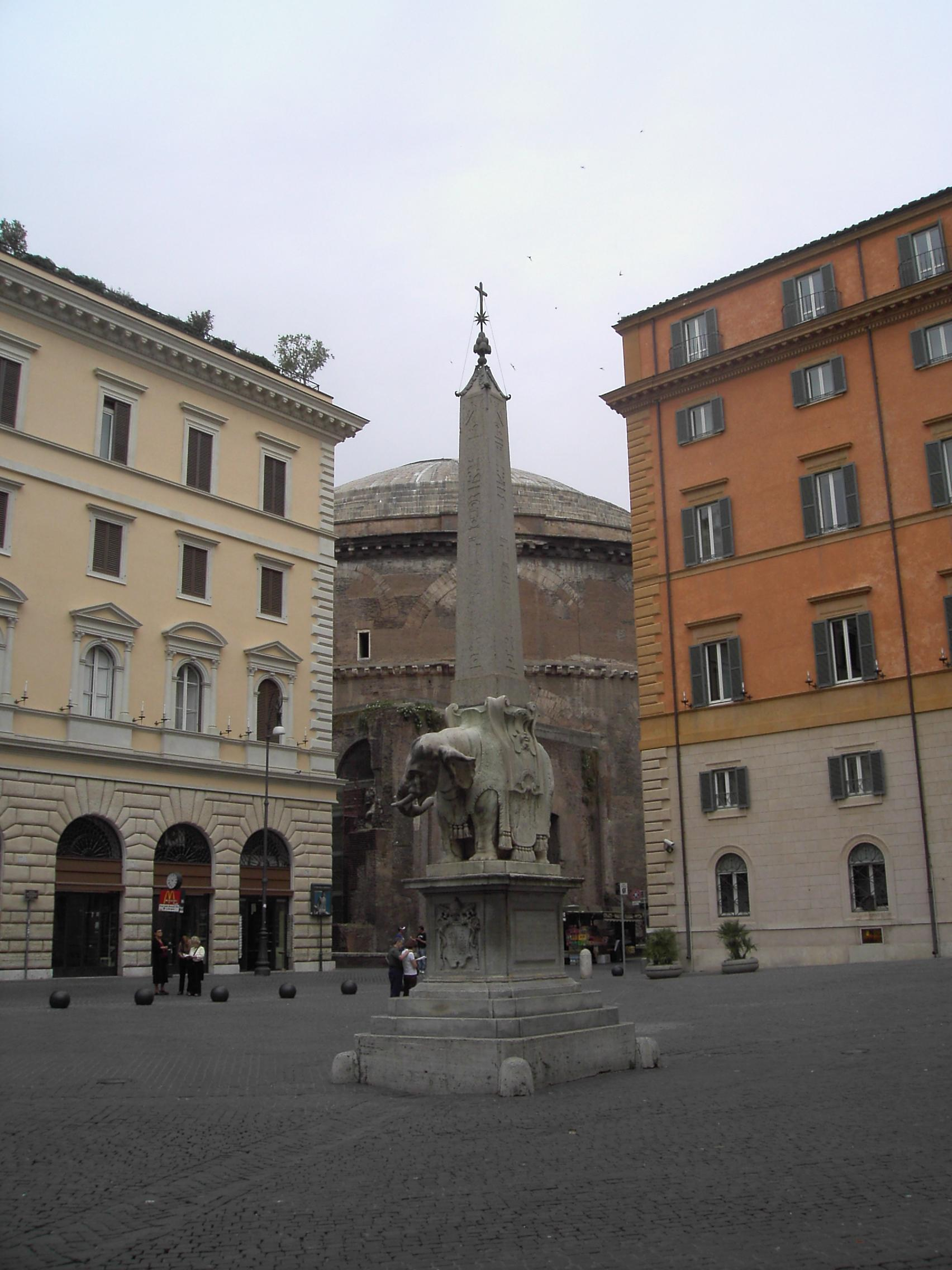
- Piazza della Minerva towards the Pantheon
- Location: Rome, Italy
- Interactive map of Piazza della Minerva
- Coordinates: 41°53′53″N 12°28′39″E

Piazza della Minerva is a piazza in Rome, Italy, near the Pantheon. Its name derives from the existence of a temple built on the site by Pompey dedicated to Minerva Calcidica, whose statue is now in the Vatican Museums.

== Features ==
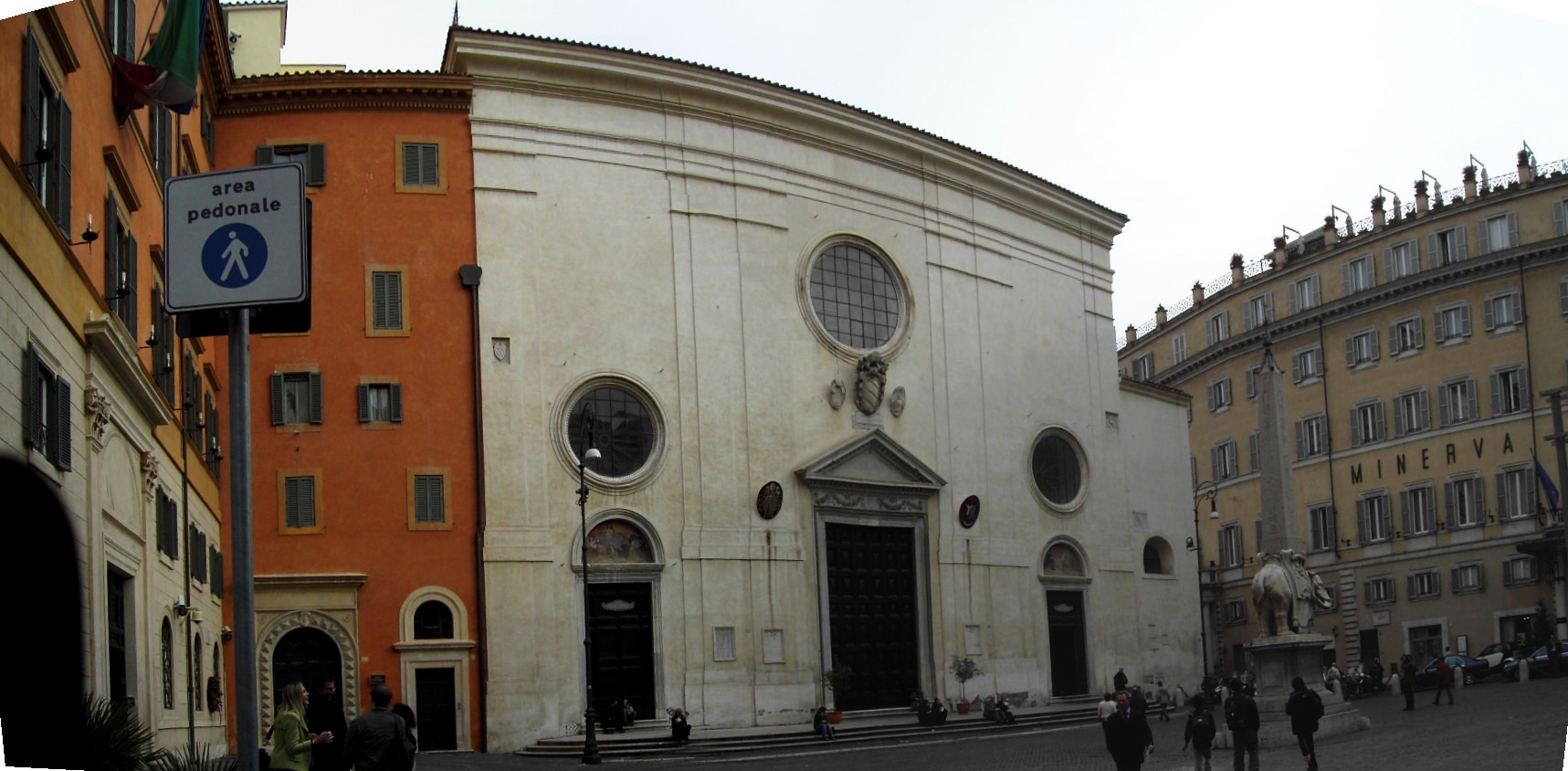
Looking towards the church

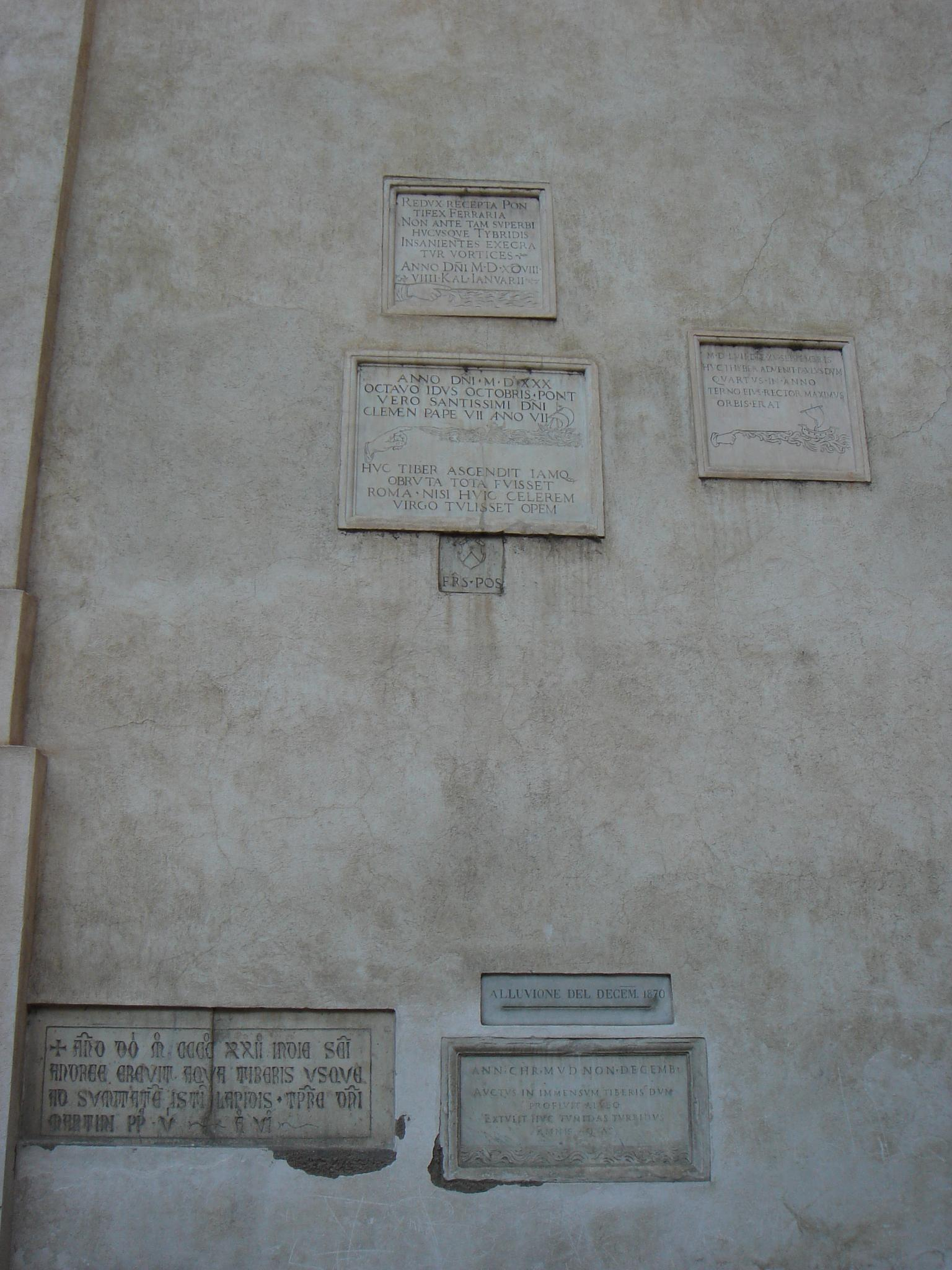
Memorials to the flooding of the River Tiber between 1422 and 1598

Facing this piazza are:

- the church of Santa Maria sopra Minerva, centre of the square, already attested in the 8th century by the Anonymous of Einsiedeln by the name (ecclesia) "S. Mariae in Minervio". To the right of its facade are inscriptions built into the wall commemorating the flooding of the River Tiber between 1422 and 1598 - the area of the piazza is the lowest in Rome, and so was always the first to suffer in flooding.
- A convent (or casa professa) of the Dominicans, who held the nearby church from the 13th century. This expanded over time to Via del Seminario and to the church of San Macuto, in the space formerly occupied by three Roman temples - the aforementioned Minervium, the Iseum, and the Serapeum.

== Inquisition ==
From the 17th century, the convent became the base of the Roman Inquisition or Holy Office, and it housed the trial and recantation of Galileo Galilei. Little remains of the Dominican complex except its cloister: This had been largely rebuilt from the original building, and expropriated by the state in 1870 as the seat of the Ministry of Public Education and for a short time the Ministry of Post and Telecommunications. The cloister now holds the library of the Italian Senate, dedicated to Giovanni Spadolini.

- At the centre of the piazza, backing onto the Inquisition convent, is the 1667 Elephant and Obelisk by Bernini. This obelisk was excavated in the cloister and came from the Iseum. The elephant was known as "il pulcin della Minerva", or "porcino", from the Roman people's story that ― uninspired by elephants ― Bernini in fact sculpted a pig.
- To the right of the church stands the 16th century Palazzo Fonseca, since 1832 the site of one of the historic hotels of Rome, known as the Minerva, whose guests have included Stendhal and José de San Martín, remembered in plaques on the facade.
- Opposite the church is the Pontifical Ecclesiastical Academy (the former Pontifical Academy of Ecclesiastical Nobles). The original 14-century palace was completely rebuilt in 1878.

== See also ==
- Piazza del Gesù

Preceded by Piazza del Popolo	Landmarks of Rome; Piazza della Minerva	Succeeded by Piazza della Repubblica, Rome
