= Giuseppe Sciuti =

Italian painter (1834–1911)

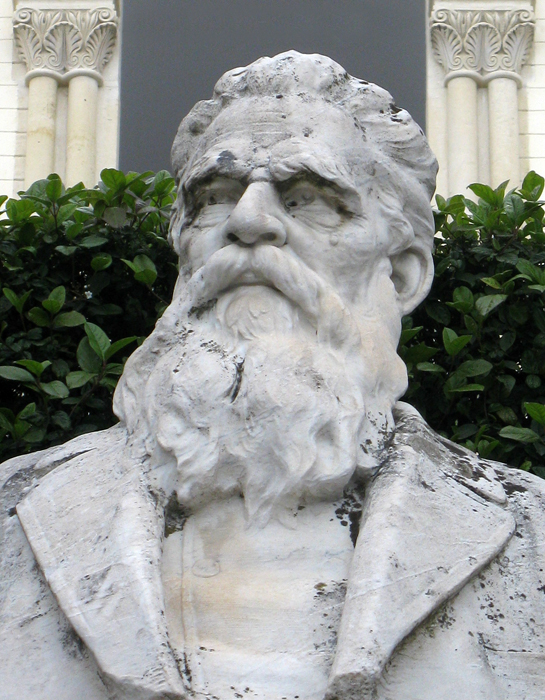
Bust of Giuseppe Sciuti in Zafferana Etnea

Giuseppe Sciuti (26 February 1834 – 13 March 1911) was an Italian painter.

== Biography ==
He was born in Zafferana Etnea, Sicily. His father, a pharmacist, insisted his son follow his trade. But he relented and allowed Giuseppe to study locally at age 15, and later with a small allowance from his father, in Catania, where he worked under Giuseppe Destefani, a scenographer, for six months. He also studied under the ornamental painter Giuseppe Rapisardi. Afterwards, he joined the studio of the painter Antonino Gandolfo. By the age of 18, he was hoping to travel to either Florence or Rome to study, but an eruption of Etna destroyed his father's farms, and left his family impoverished. Giuseppe was forced to seek work under a local decorative painter. After 11 years of this work, and thanks to some frugality, he was able to travel to Florence, where he painted The Widow and The Betrayed, which were then exhibited at Catania, and purchased by the City Government. Returning to Catania, he completed profitable works of decoration. Two years later he left and went to Naples, where he displayed A Temptation at the annual exhibition of the Società Promotrice. He went on to paint You mothers of the country; The prisoners after the capitulation of Castelnuovo; and An episode during the sack of Catania, exhibited at the Mostra annuale della Società Promotrice of Naples. In Genoa he exhibited Domestic peace (1870).

In addition to paintings depicting patriotic and Genre themes, after the 1870s, he also specialized in painting ancient Roman and Greek subjects (Neo-Pompeian subjects). He painted a large canvas Pindar exalts the winner of an Olympic Game exhibited at the National Exhibition in Milan, and donated to the Brera Academy. He also exhibited this painting at the Universal Exposition of Vienna, where it won a medal. Funeral of Timoleone (bought by City of Palermo) and Uno sposalizio greco (bought by Brera Gallery in Milan). In 1875 from Naples he moved to Rome, and the next year won a public contest to design frescos for the Hall of the Provincial Council of Sassari, consisting of two historical paintings: Proclamation of the Sassarese Republic and the Triumphal entry of Gian Maria Angiol to Sassari. He has also painted A Geography Lesson (also called Le Gioie della Buona Mamma 1877), exhibited at the Melbourne Exposition; La Corsa a Piedi (Ancient Roman subject) and After the meal for an Ancient Roman, exhibited at the Mostra Artistica di Milan. The Timoleon and Pindar were intended for the Hall of the Senate in Rome. In his The Battle of Himera, he depicts the moment in which the Greek army defeats Hamilcar's Carthaginians. It was exhibited and sold at the 1888 Italian Exhibition of London. In 1890, he painted a number of historical scenes including the Episodio della spedizione di Pisacane a Sapri, for the Palazzo degli Elefanti in Catania.

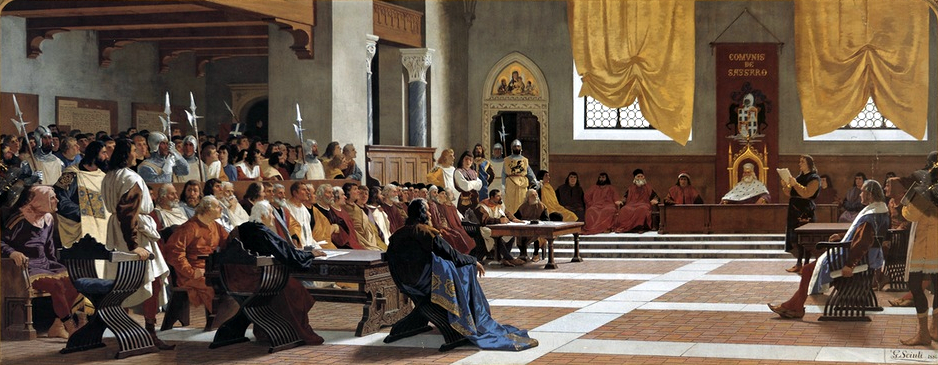
Proclamation of the Republic of Sassari
(The Council), 1880, Sassari

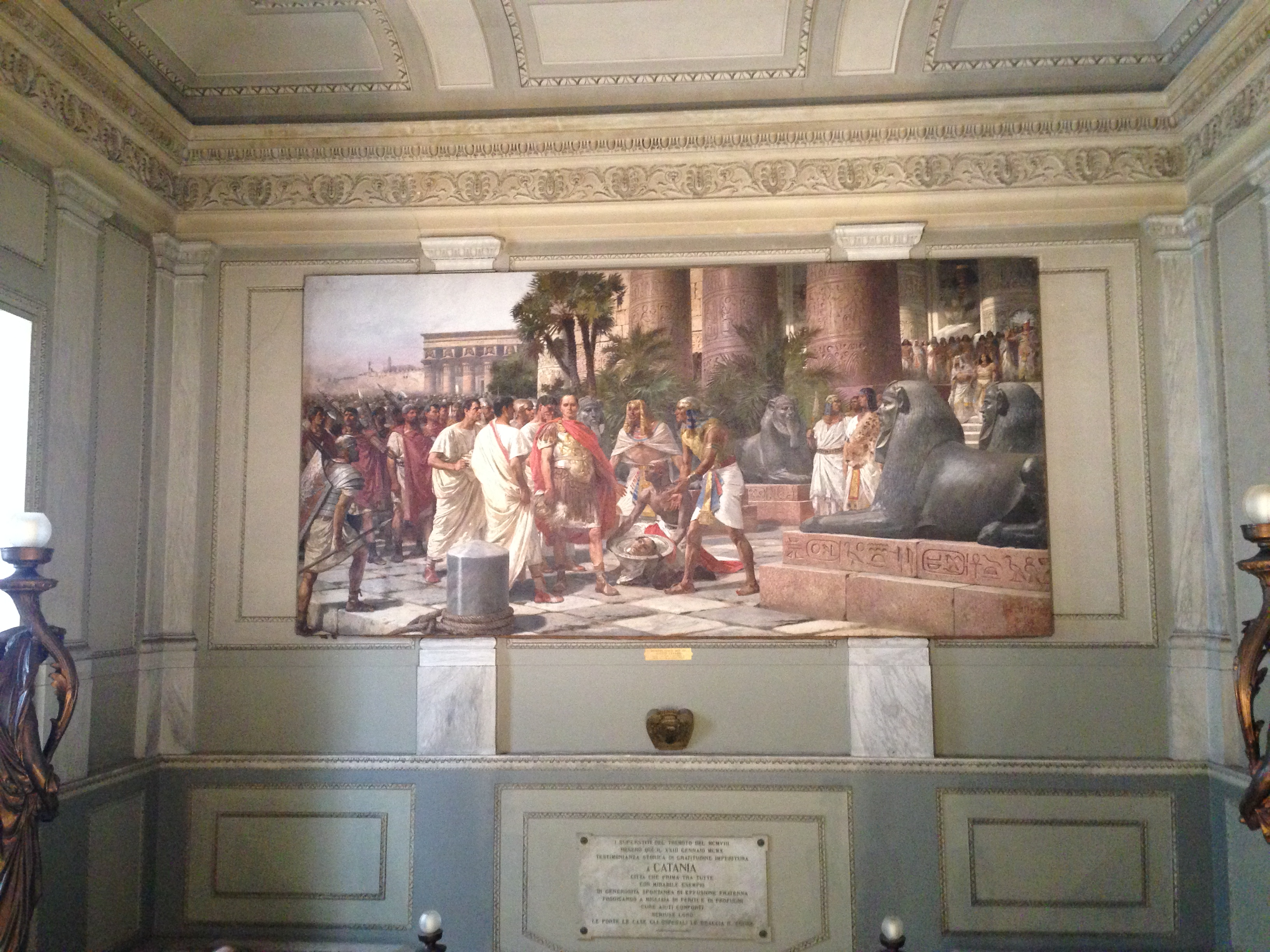
Presentation by the Egyptians of the severed head of Pompe Magnus to Julius Caesar, mural in Palazzo degli Elefanti, Catania

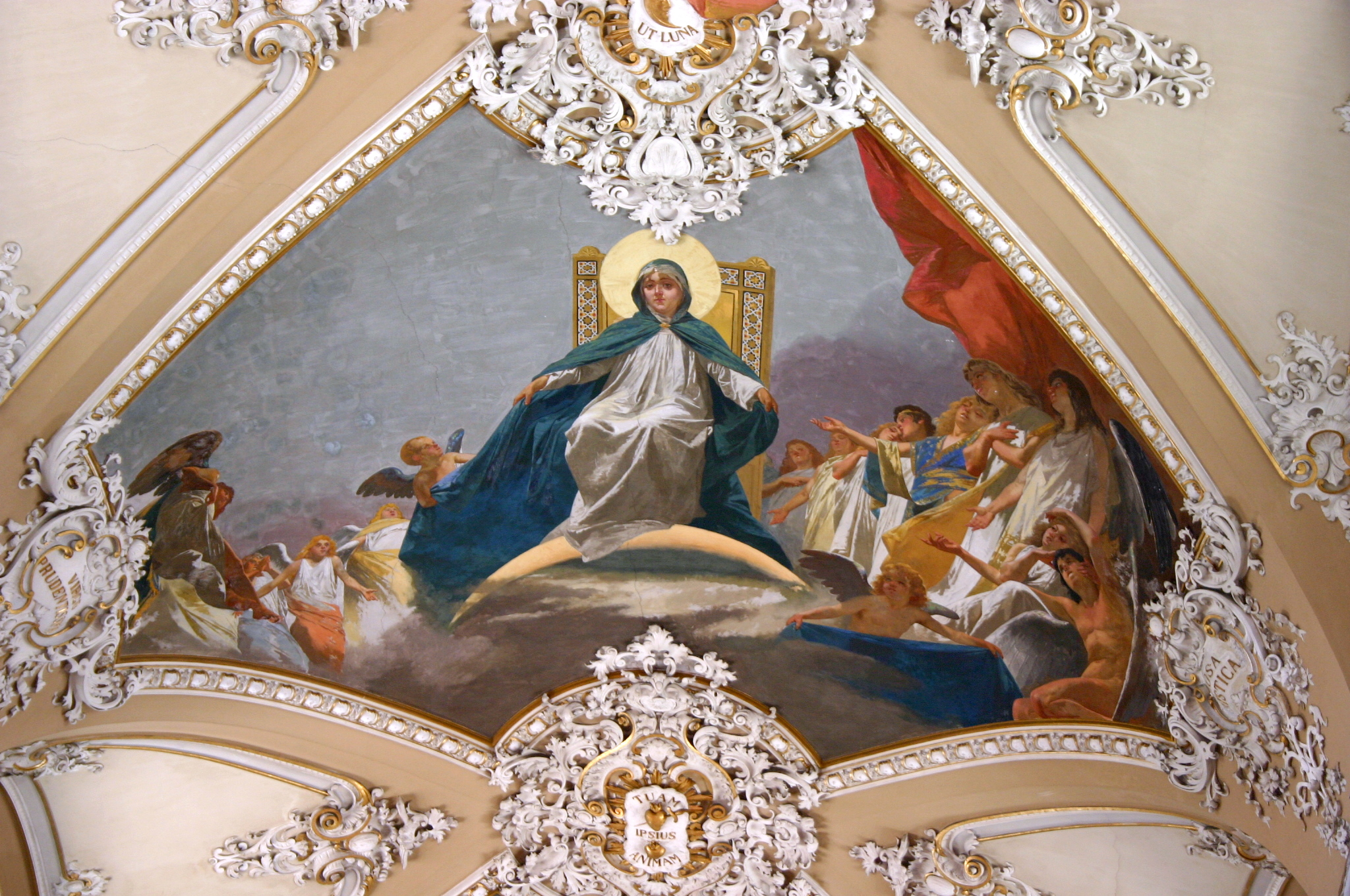
Ceiling of the Collegiata of Santa Maria dell'Elemosina in Catania

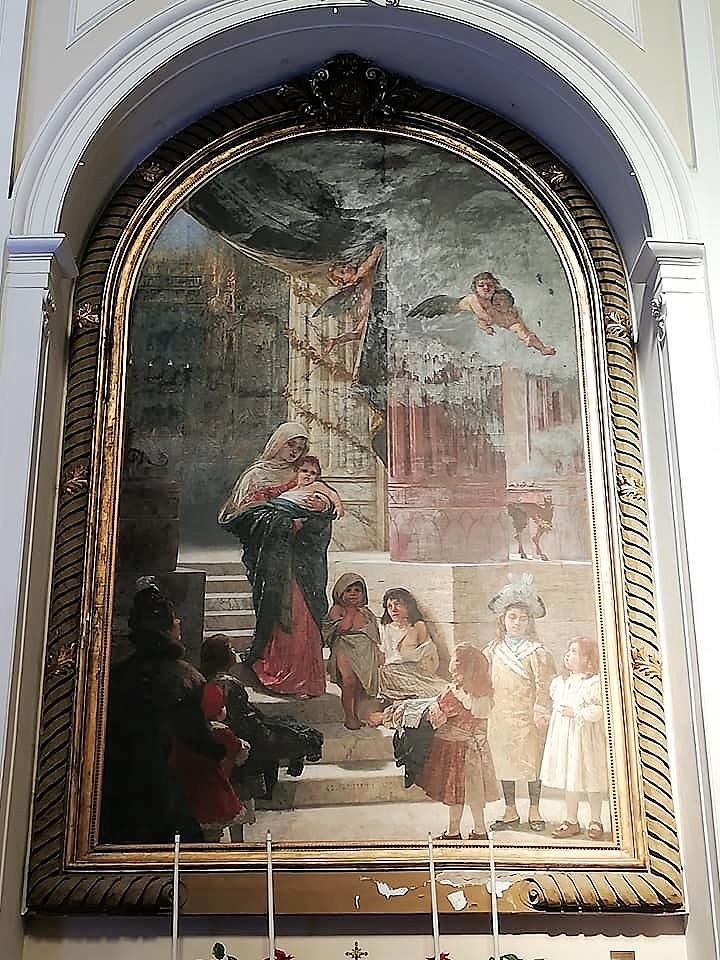
Madonna dei Bambini, Sant'Agata la Vetere, Catania

In 1896, he returned to paint the ceiling a cupola of the Basilica della Collegiata of Catania. He painted a peculiar altarpiece depicting a Vision of the Madonna dei Bambini before contemporary children for Sant'Agata la Vetere in Catania. He also painted the large work of Benessere e le Arti, now in Zafferan Etnea. In 1902–1905, Sciuti painted the ceilings of seven rooms in the Palazzo Calanna of Acireale, including a large fresco depicting the Battle of Aquilio. In 1905, he frescoed eight medallions in the Private chapel of the Castello Pennisi of Floristella.

He began in 1905 to fresco in the Acireale Cathedral, work he did until 1907 alongside his pupil Primo Panciroli. This work depicted Orchestra degli Angeli, Choir of Virgins, Glory of the Angels carrying the symbols of Santa Venera, an Annunciation, Faith, and Holy Father and Prophets. He also decorated the Church of the Holy Heart of Jesus dedicated to Anata Venerina in Acireale, the ceilings of Palazzi Musumeci e Nicolosi, and of the ceiling of the Salone of the city hall in Acireale (1942).

He also painted two large sipari or theater curtains, that of the Massimo Theater of Catania with Il trionfo dei catanesi sui libici (1883) and of the Theater of Palermo with the Uscita di Ruggero I dal Palazzo Reale.

Sciuti died in Rome in 1911. His marble bust stands before the city hall in Zafferana Etnea.
