= Clementi Clinic building, Catania =

Former surgical facility in Sicily

Coordinates: 37°30′44″N 15°4′45″E

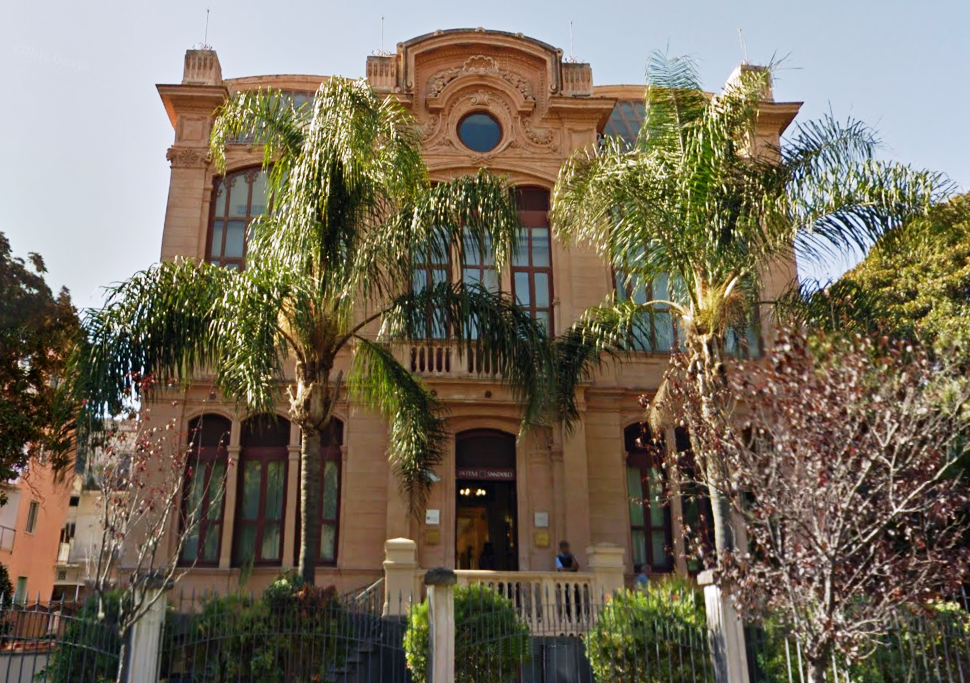
Clementi Clinic in Piazza Santa Maria di Gesù ("Saint Mary of Jesus square"), Catania, Sicily, Italy.

The Clementi Clinic is a former surgical facility located on Viale Regina Margherita in Catania, in the region of Sicily, Italy. It was erected in 1904 and designed by Carlo Sada in a Liberty style (Italian Art Nouveau). It presently houses offices of the Intesa San Paolo bank. The building is remarkable for the large windows in the upper floor used to provide natural light for the surgical suite.
