= Palazzo dell'Esposizione =

Former building in Catania

- Palazzo dell'Esposizione
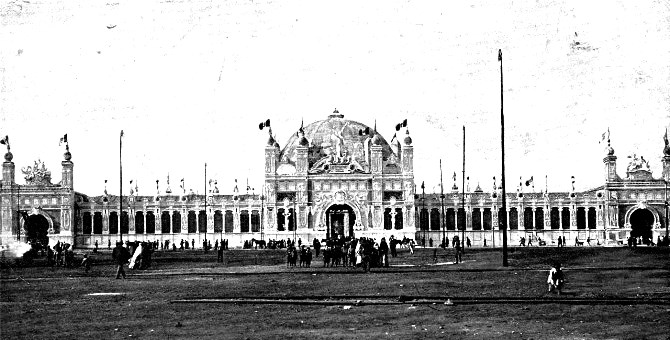
- Address: Catania; Italy
- Type: Palace
- Events: Gothic, Orientalist and Neo-Moorish
- Current use: Destroyed

Construction
- Opened: April 14, 1907
- Closed: 1 December 1907
- Demolished: 1911
- Architect: Luciano Franco

The Palazzo dell'Esposizione was a building in Catania erected to host the 1907 Sicilian Agricultural Exposition. The building had the architectural style reminiscent of the eclecticism-liberty of Catania, as well as being Gothic-Orientalist and Neo-Moorish. The building was located in Piazza d'Armi (today's Piazza Giovanni Verga) and was built according to plans by Sicilian engineer Luciano Franco (1868–1943).

Although all of the existing structures built for the Expo were dismantled as of 1st December 1907, the building itself was actually demolished in 1911.

In 1936, in the northern side of the esplanade, which by then had been renamed Piazza dell'Esposizione, works for the construction of the imposing Palace of Justice were set in motion, to be completed in 1953, after a hiatus owing mainly to World War II, lasting from 1940 to 1948.
