= Casa Venegoni =

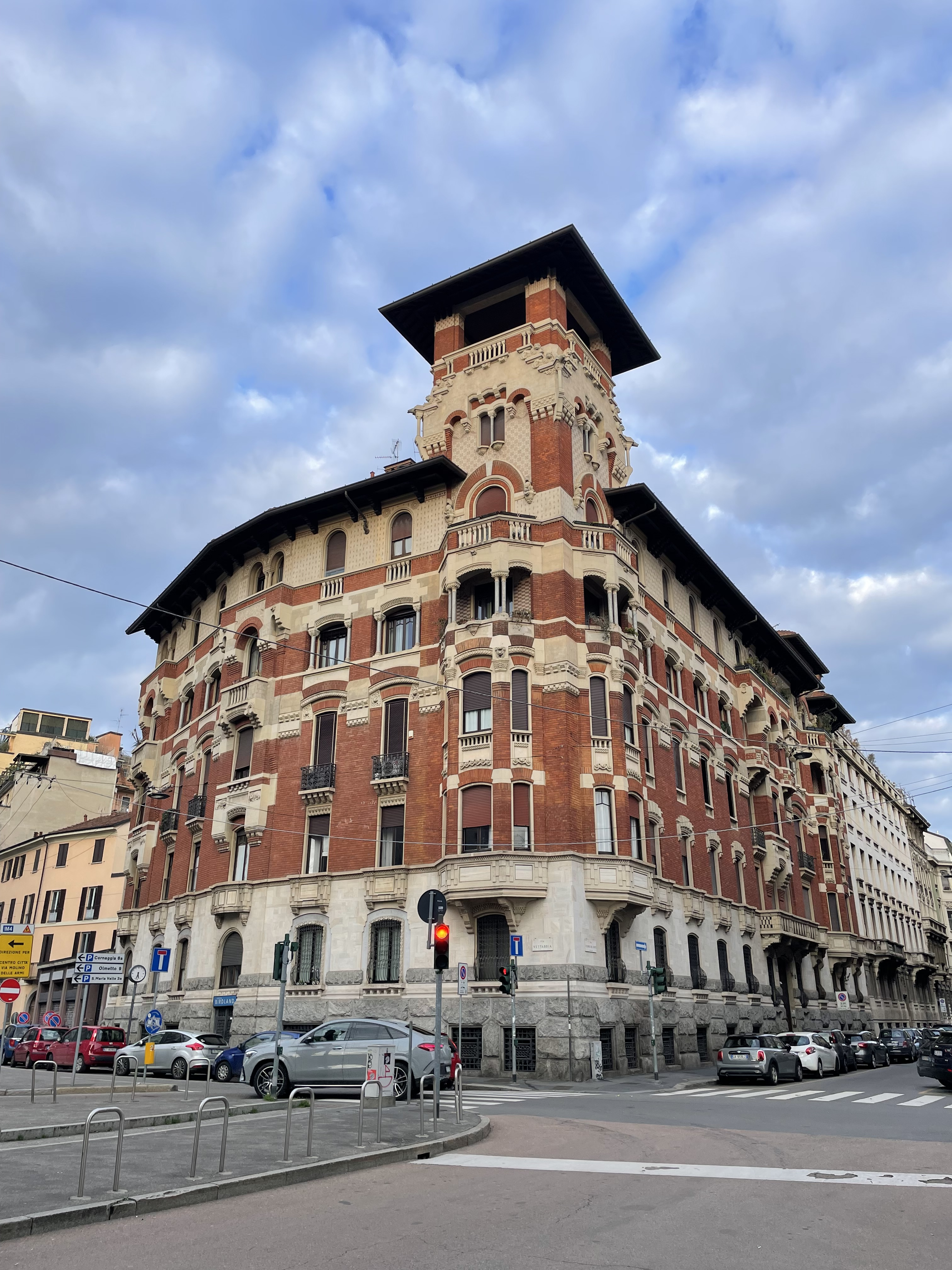
- Casa Venegoni in Milan
- Click on the map for a fullscreen view

General information
- Location: Milan, Italy
- Coordinates: 45°27′20″N 9°11′04.2″E

Casa Venegoni is a historic building situated in Milan, Italy.

== History ==
The building was built between 1923 and 1927.

== Description ==
The building features a Liberty style, the Italian declination of the Art Nouveau, with strong Neogothic influences. A tower crowned by a loggia characterizes the corner of its façades.
