= List of municipalities of the Metropolitan City of Catania =

The following is a list of the 58 municipalities (comuni) of the Metropolitan City of Catania in the autonomous region of Sicily in Italy.

== List ==
Municipality	Population (2026)	Area (km²)	Density
Aci Bonaccorsi	3,559	1.72	2,069.2
Aci Castello	17,482	8.71	2,007.1
Aci Catena	27,349	8.53	3,206.2
Aci Sant'Antonio	18,091	14.33	1,262.5
Acireale	50,528	40.43	1,249.8
Adrano	33,506	83.22	402.6
Belpasso	28,321	166.33	170.3
Biancavilla	22,917	70.28	326.1
Bronte	18,101	250.86	72.2
Calatabiano	5,145	26.42	194.7
Caltagirone	35,373	383.38	92.3
Camporotondo Etneo	5,208	6.55	795.1
Castel di Iudica	4,163	103.21	40.3
Castiglione di Sicilia	2,832	118.90	23.8
Catania	296,984	182.90	1,623.8
Fiumefreddo di Sicilia	8,965	12.16	737.3
Giarre	26,466	27.32	968.7
Grammichele	12,127	31.02	390.9
Gravina di Catania	25,330	5.15	4,918.4
Licodia Eubea	2,762	112.45	24.6
Linguaglossa	4,987	60.25	82.8
Maletto	3,522	40.96	86.0
Maniace	3,739	37.70	99.2
Mascali	14,486	37.85	382.7
Mascalucia	32,124	16.28	1,973.2
Mazzarrone	4,010	34.78	115.3
Militello in Val di Catania	6,605	62.48	105.7
Milo	1,017	16.67	61.0
Mineo	4,345	246.32	17.6
Mirabella Imbaccari	4,132	15.30	270.1
Misterbianco	48,620	37.68	1,290.3
Motta Sant'Anastasia	12,139	35.71	339.9
Nicolosi	7,720	42.65	181.0
Palagonia	15,369	57.79	265.9
Paternò	44,502	144.68	307.6
Pedara	15,522	19.23	807.2
Piedimonte Etneo	3,865	26.54	145.6
Raddusa	2,751	23.39	117.6
Ragalna	4,396	39.53	111.2
Ramacca	10,029	306.44	32.7
Randazzo	9,959	205.62	48.4
Riposto	13,901	13.25	1,049.1
San Cono	2,363	6.63	356.4
San Giovanni la Punta	24,458	10.85	2,254.2
San Gregorio di Catania	11,518	5.65	2,038.6
San Michele di Ganzaria	2,807	25.81	108.8
San Pietro Clarenza	8,372	6.27	1,335.2
Sant'Agata li Battiati	9,217	3.12	2,954.2
Sant'Alfio	1,521	25.86	58.8
Santa Maria di Licodia	7,675	26.28	292.0
Santa Venerina	8,487	19.03	446.0
Scordia	15,885	24.31	653.4
Trecastagni	11,396	19.16	594.8
Tremestieri Etneo	19,172	6.52	2,940.5
Valverde	7,810	5.52	1,414.9
Viagrande	8,943	10.09	886.3
Vizzini	5,636	126.75	44.5
Zafferana Etnea	9,341	76.87	121.5

== See also ==
- List of municipalities of Sicily
- List of municipalities of Italy
