= Acitana =

Variety of grape

Acitana is a red Italian wine grape variety that is grown in northeast Sicily, around the city of Messina. It is often blended with Nerello Cappuccio and Nerello Mascalese, though Acitana is officially not a permitted variety for wines labeled under the local Faro DOC.

== History ==
The province of Catania where Acitana likely originated.

Ampelographers believe that Acitana is likely native to the island of Sicily and may have originated near of Catania on the east coast of the island. Northeast of Catania are several villages in the province of Catania with names that begin with Aci, such as Aci Sant'Antonio, Acireale, Aci Catena, Aci Castello and Aci Bonaccorsi, so it is possible that the name Acitana could be a portmanteau of Cantania and one of these Aci villages.

== Wine regions ==
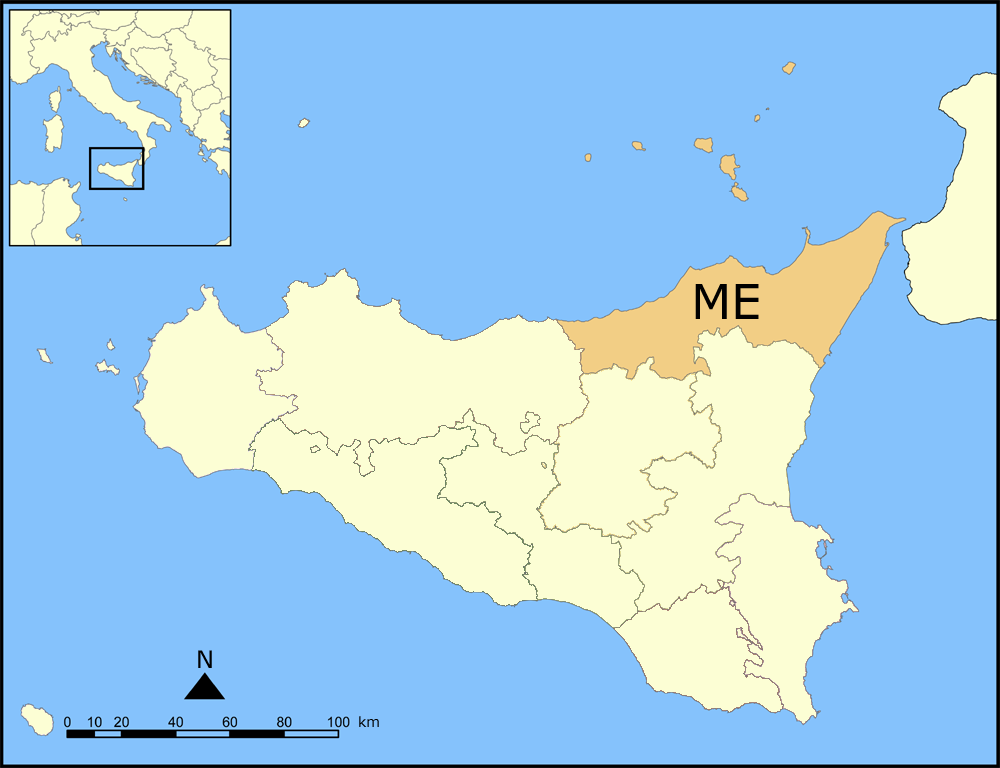
The province of Messina where Acitana is mostly found today.

While historically, Acitana was once widely throughout the provinces of Catania and Messina, today it is mostly found near in Messina. While not officially recognized for use in the red Denominazione di origine controllata (DOC) wine of Faro, the grape is sometimes used for vino da tavola red bends with Nerello Cappuccio and Nerello Mascalese.

== Synonyms ==
Over the years, Acitana has also been known under the synonym Citana nera.
