= Gregorio (disambiguation) =

Gregorio is a given name and a surname. Gregorio or Gregório may also refer to:

== Geography ==
- Gregório River (Amazonas), Brazil
- Gregório River (Goiás), Brazil
- Gregorio Peak, British Columbia, Canada
- Cerro Gregorio, Puerto Rico, a mountain

== Other uses ==
- Gregorio (footballer), Equatoguinean footballer Gregorio Manuel Salvador Elá (born 1981)
- Gregorio (cardinal) (died probably 1141), a cardinal-nephew of Pope Innocent II
- Gregorio (software), a free and open-source scorewriter computer program
- Gregorio (film), 1985 Peruvian film

== See also ==
- San Gregorio (disambiguation)
- Gregoria (disambiguation)
- Gregorios, a list of people and fictional characters with the given name or surname
