= Rosario Di Bella =

Italian singer-songwriter and composer (born 1963)

- Born: 27 July 1963 (age 63); Zafferana Etnea, Catania, Italy
- Occupations: Composer, singer-songwriter, music arranger and musician

Rosario Di Bella (born 27 July 1963) is an Italian composer, singer-songwriter, music arranger and musician.

== Background ==
Born in Zafferana Etnea, Catania, the son of a trumpeter, Di Bella spent much of his childhood in Geneva. At just eight years old he started playing guitar, and shortly later he began studying piano. He studied medicine at the University of Catania. After a long period spent traveling around the world and playing with groups and formations from different backgrounds, in 1987 he participated at the Castrocaro Music Festival, winning the competition with the song "Sono interessante".

The first album, Pittore Di Me Stesso, was released in 1989, obtaining good reviews from critics.

In 1991, he debuted at the Sanremo Music Festival, as a member of a trio consisting of himself, Marco Conidi and Bungaro; their song "E noi qui" was a commercial success. He came back in Sanremo Festival as a soloist two years later, with the song "E io che non volevo".

In 1995, he got his major commercial success with the song "Difficile amarsi". Since 2001, he has focused on composing, writing among others for Paolo Meneguzzi and Patty Pravo.

== Discography ==
- 1989 – Pittore di me stesso
- 1991 – Figlio perfetto
- 1995 – Esperanto
- 2000 – I miei amici
- 2001 – Rosario Di Bella (collection)
- 2004 – Made in Italy (collection)
- 2007 – Il negozio della solitudine
- 2016 – Spirituality (in couple with Juri Camisasca)
