= San Gregorio =

San Gregorio (Spanish and Italian for Saint Gregory) may refer to:

== People ==
- Santos Gregorio - (Saint Gregory of Nazianzus) (c.330-c.390)
- San Gregorio Magno, Saint Gregory the Great - Pope Gregory I (c.540-604)
  - San Gregorio Magno al Celio a church in Rome dedicated to Gregory

== Places ==
Italy

- San Gregorio, Assisi, Umbria
- San Gregorio, L'Aquila, Abruzzo
- San Gregorio da Sassola, Lazio
- San Gregorio di Catania, Sicily
- San Gregorio d'Ippona, Calabria
- San Gregorio Matese, Campania
- San Gregorio nelle Alpi, Veneto

United States

- San Gregorio, California, in San Mateo County
  - San Gregorio Fault, an offshore component of the San Andreas system of faults
  - San Gregorio nude beach
  - San Gregorio State Beach
  - San Gregorio Creek
- San Gregorio Reservoir, Rio Arriba County, New Mexico

Elsewhere

- San Gregorio, Argentina, General López Department, Santa Fe
- Arenales de San Gregorio, Ciudad Real, Spain
- San Gregorio, Entre Ríos, Argentina
- San Gregorio, Santa Fe, Argentina
- San Gregorio, Chile, Magallanes, Chile
- San Gregorio Atzompa, Puebla, Mexico
- San Gregorio Cautzingo, Mexico
- San Gregorio de Nigua, Dominican Republic
- San Gregorio de Polanco, Tacuarembó Department, Uruguay
- San Gregorio, Uruguay, Rocha Department, Uruguay

== Other ==
- A.S.D. Club Calcio San Gregorio, Italian football club
