= Valverde, Sicily =

Valverde
- Comune
- Comune di Valverde
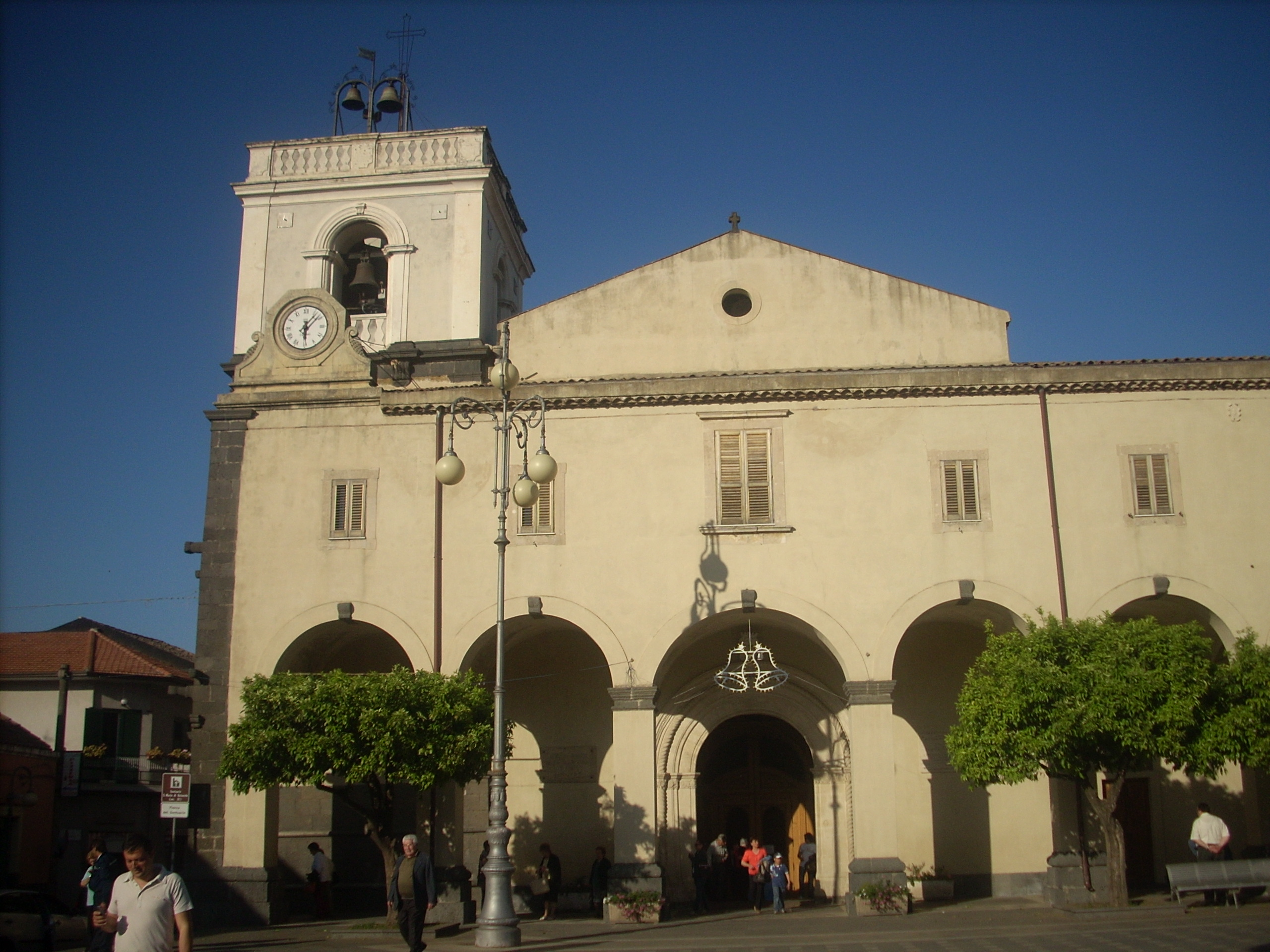
- Sanctuary of the Madonna, Valverde

- Location within Italy Location within Sicily
- Coordinates: 37°34′N 15°7′E
- Country: Italy
- Region: Sicily
- Metropolitan city: Catania (CT)

Government
  - Mayor: Domenico Caggegi

Area
  - Total: 5.52 km^{2} (2.13 sq mi)
- Elevation: 567 m (1,860 ft)

Population (30 November 2025)
  - Total: 7,821
  - Density: 1,420/km^{2} (3,670/sq mi)
- Demonym: Valverdesi
- Time zone: UTC+1 (CET)
  - Summer (DST): UTC+2 (CEST)
- Postal code: 95028
- Dialing code: 095
- Website: www.comune.valverde.ct.it

Valverde (Sicilian: Bedduvirdi) is a comune (municipality) in the Metropolitan City of Catania in the Italian region Sicily, located about 170 kilometres (110 mi) southeast of Palermo and about 7 kilometres (4 mi) northeast of Catania.

Valverde borders the following municipalities: Aci Bonaccorsi, Aci Castello, Aci Catena, Aci Sant'Antonio, San Giovanni la Punta, San Gregorio di Catania.

== Origins of the name ==
Many historians today debate the origin of the ancient late antique place name “Vallis Viridis.” The village was called “Bedduviddi” (Belverde) in Sicilian, and then Italianized, but not without controversy.on May 25, 1952.

== History ==
Under Spanish rule in the 17th century, the remarkable economic development of Aquilia Nuova (Acireale) caused conflict and rivalry with other hamlets that sought administrative autonomy. Thus, the separation of the hamlets of Aci was granted. The following hamlets were founded: Aci Bonaccorsi (1652), Aci Castello (1647) (also including Aci Trezza), Aci San Filippo, and Aci Sant'Antonio (1628) (which at the time also included "Aci" Valverde, Aci Catena, and Aci Santa Lucia).

Municipal autonomy, however, did not come until modern times: the spark was the diversion by the municipality of Aci Sant'Antonio of funds earmarked for the construction of the cemetery in the then hamlet of Valverde in the Caramme district, which sparked a reaction from the Valverde residents: it was 1949. Two years later, on May 6, 1951, with Regional Law no. 39 of April 14, 1951, established the Municipality of Valverde; elections for the first municipal council were held on May 25, 1952. The first mayor was Vincenzo Gammino, who was re-elected several times and served for over 25 years.

== Monuments and places of interest ==
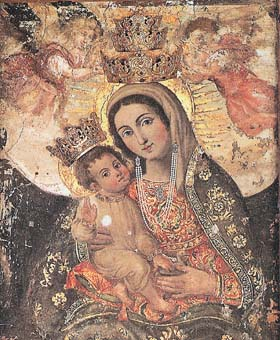
Sacred icon of the Madonna

=== Religious architectures ===
- Sanctuary of Maria Santissima di Valverde: was originally constructed in the latter half of the 13th century, and enlarged and embellished in the 16th century. It located in the center and undoubtedly of medieval origin, although remodeled in later periods. Another spiritual site is the Hermitage of Sant'Anna, which, despite belonging to the territory of Aci Catena, has had a significant impact on the life of the city.
- Church of Santa Maria delle Grazie: it is the parish church of the hamlet of Maugeri. It was destroyed by the earthquake of 1693 and subsequently rebuilt in 1714.
- Church of Santa Maria della Misericordia: it was built by the Confraternity of Mercy in 1696, a few years after the earthquake of '93 that had destroyed the old church.

=== Civil architectures ===
- Remains of an early village near the Casal Rosato district are found within the municipal area.
- The Baroque-era Equinoctial Sundial: is made of gray granite and weighs approximately 4,000 kg. Originally from the Archbishop's Curia of Milan, it was sold by a Milanese auction house in 1975/1976 to Dr. Riccardo Mannino, who donated it to the Municipality of Valverde in 2008. On February 12, 2016, the clock was placed in the area between the intersection of Corso Vittorio Emanuele, Via Fontana, and Via del Santuario, thanks to the Archconfraternity of Mercy of Valverde, which has managed the municipal flowerbed since October 2, 2015.
- Casalrosato fountain: is one of the local attractions and known for its beauty and historical value.
- Carminello district: there are facilities for repeating national and local radio and TV signals.

== Society ==
During the period of Italian unification, Valverde continued to fight for its autonomy. In 1951, with regional law no. 39, the municipality of Valverde was officially established, with a population of 1,641 inhabitants and an area of 5.5 km^{2} (2.1 sq mi).

=== Demographic evolution ===
Historical population

Year	Pop.	±%
1861	844	—
1871	1,101	+30.5%
1881	1,129	+2.5%
1901	1,036	−8.2%
1911	938	−9.5%
1921	991	+5.7%

Year	Pop.	±%
1931	1,179	+19.0%
1936	1,700	+44.2%
1951	1,641	−3.5%
1961	1,920	+17.0%
1971	3,004	+56.5%
1981	4,684	+55.9%

Year	Pop.	±%
1991	5,717	+22.1%
2001	7,246	+26.7%
2011	7,714	+6.5%
2021	7,838	+1.6%

Source: Data from ISTAT

== Notable people ==
Giuseppe Marletta (1892-1985), painter
