= Sant'Alfio =

Saint Alphius
- Comune
- Comune di Sant'Alfio
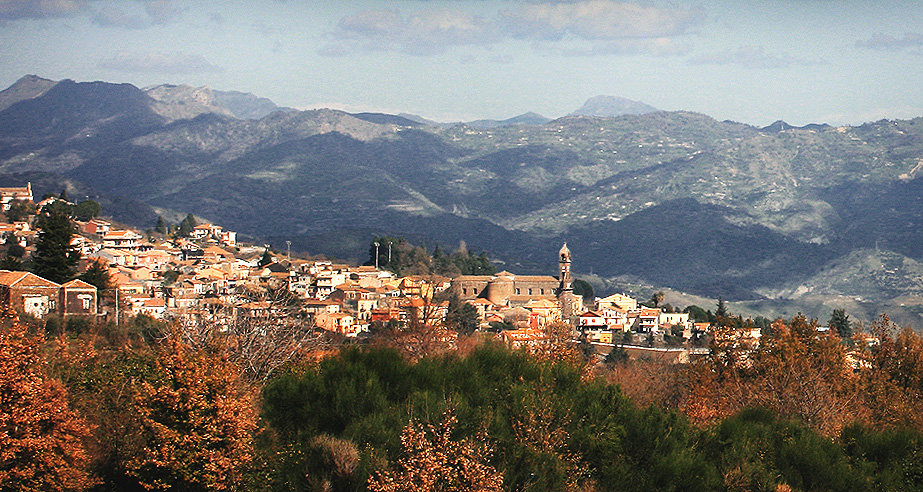

- Location within Italy Location within Sicily
- Coordinates: 37°45′N 15°8′E
- Country: Italy
- Region: Sicily
- Metropolitan city: Catania (CT)

Government
  - Mayor: Giuseppe Maria Nicotra

Area
  - Total: 23.6 km^{2} (9.1 sq mi)
- Elevation: 531 m (1,742 ft)

Population (31 December 2015)
  - Total: 1,582
  - Density: 67.0/km^{2} (174/sq mi)
- Demonym: Santalfiesi
- Time zone: UTC+1 (CET)
  - Summer (DST): UTC+2 (CEST)
- Postal code: 95010
- Dialing code: 095
- Patron saint: Sts. Alphius, Philadelphus and Cyrinus
- Website: www.comune.sant-alfio.ct.it

Saint Alphius (Italian: Sant'Alfio; Sicilian: Sant'Arfiu) is a comune (municipality) in the Metropolitan City of Catania in the Italian region Sicily, about 160 kilometres (99 mi) east of Palermo and about 25 kilometres (16 mi) north of Catania.

Saint Alphius borders the following municipalities: Adrano, Belpasso, Biancavilla, Bronte, Castiglione di Sicilia, Giarre, Linguaglossa, Maletto, Mascali, Milo, Nicolosi, Piedimonte Etneo, Randazzo, Zafferana Etnea.
