= Maletto =

- Comune
- Comune di Maletto
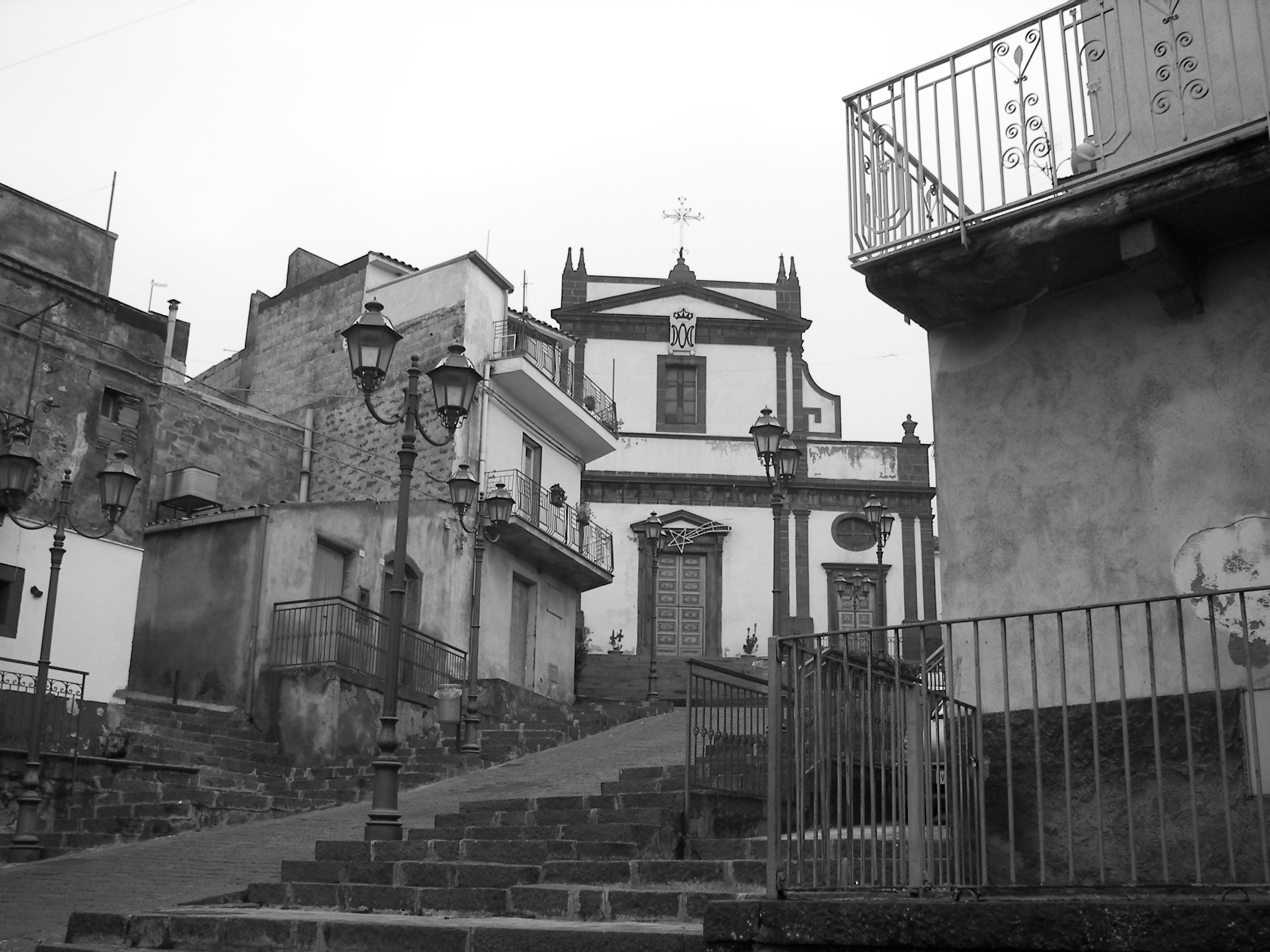
- Mother church.

- Location within Italy Location within Sicily
- Coordinates: 37°50′N 14°52′E
- Country: Italy
- Region: Sicily
- Metropolitan city: Catania (CT)

Government
  - Mayor: Giuseppe De Luca

Area
  - Total: 40.9 km^{2} (15.8 sq mi)
- Elevation: 960 m (3,150 ft)

Population (31 December 2010)
  - Total: 4,061
  - Density: 99.3/km^{2} (257/sq mi)
- Demonym: Malettesi
- Time zone: UTC+1 (CET)
  - Summer (DST): UTC+2 (CEST)
- Postal code: 95035
- Dialing code: 095
- Website: www.comune.maletto.ct.it

Maletto (Sicilian: Malettu) is a comune (municipality) in the Metropolitan City of Catania in the Italian region Sicily, located about 140 kilometres (87 mi) east of Palermo and about 40 kilometres (25 mi) northwest of Catania.

Maletto borders the following municipalities: Adrano, Belpasso, Biancavilla, Bronte, Castiglione di Sicilia, Nicolosi, Randazzo, Sant'Alfio, Zafferana Etnea. It is an enclave within Bronte and borders the other eight at one point at the top of Mount Etna.
