= Belpasso =

Belpasso Malupassu / Marpassu (Sicilian)
- Comune
- Comune di Belpasso
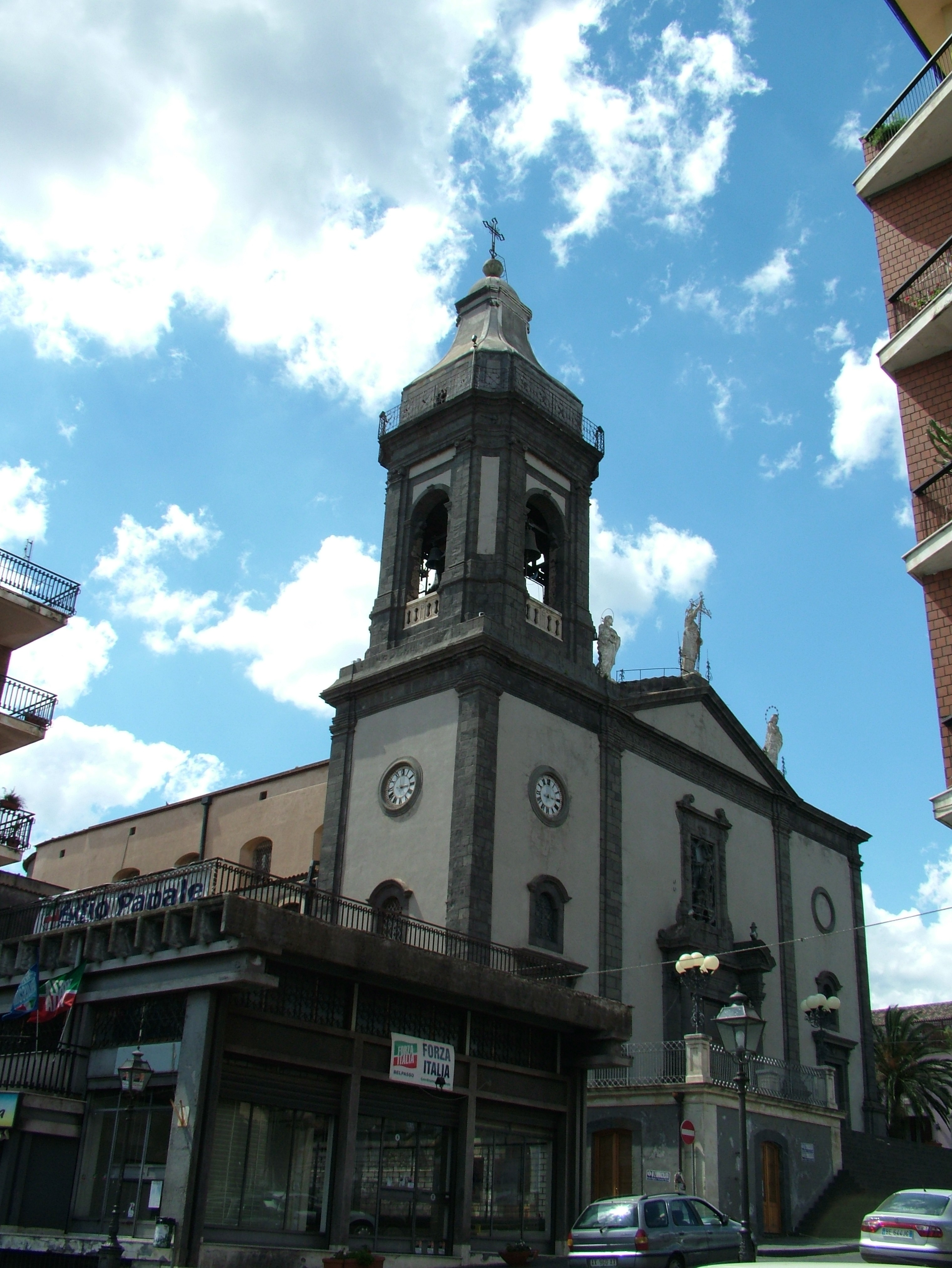
- Chiesa Madre

- Location within Italy Location within Sicily
- Coordinates: 37°35′N 14°59′E
- Country: Italy
- Region: Sicily
- Metropolitan city: Catania (CT)
- Frazioni: Piano Tavola

Government
  - Mayor: Daniele Giuseppe Maria Motta

Area
  - Total: 166.33 km^{2} (64.22 sq mi)
- Elevation: 551 m (1,808 ft)

Population (30 April 2017)
  - Total: 28,128
  - Density: 169.11/km^{2} (437.99/sq mi)
- Demonym: "Belpassesi" or "Mappassoti" in Sicilian
- Time zone: UTC+1 (CET)
  - Summer (DST): UTC+2 (CEST)
- Postal code: 95032
- Dialing code: 095
- Patron saint: St. Lucy
- Saint day: 13 December
- Website: www.comune.belpasso.ct.it

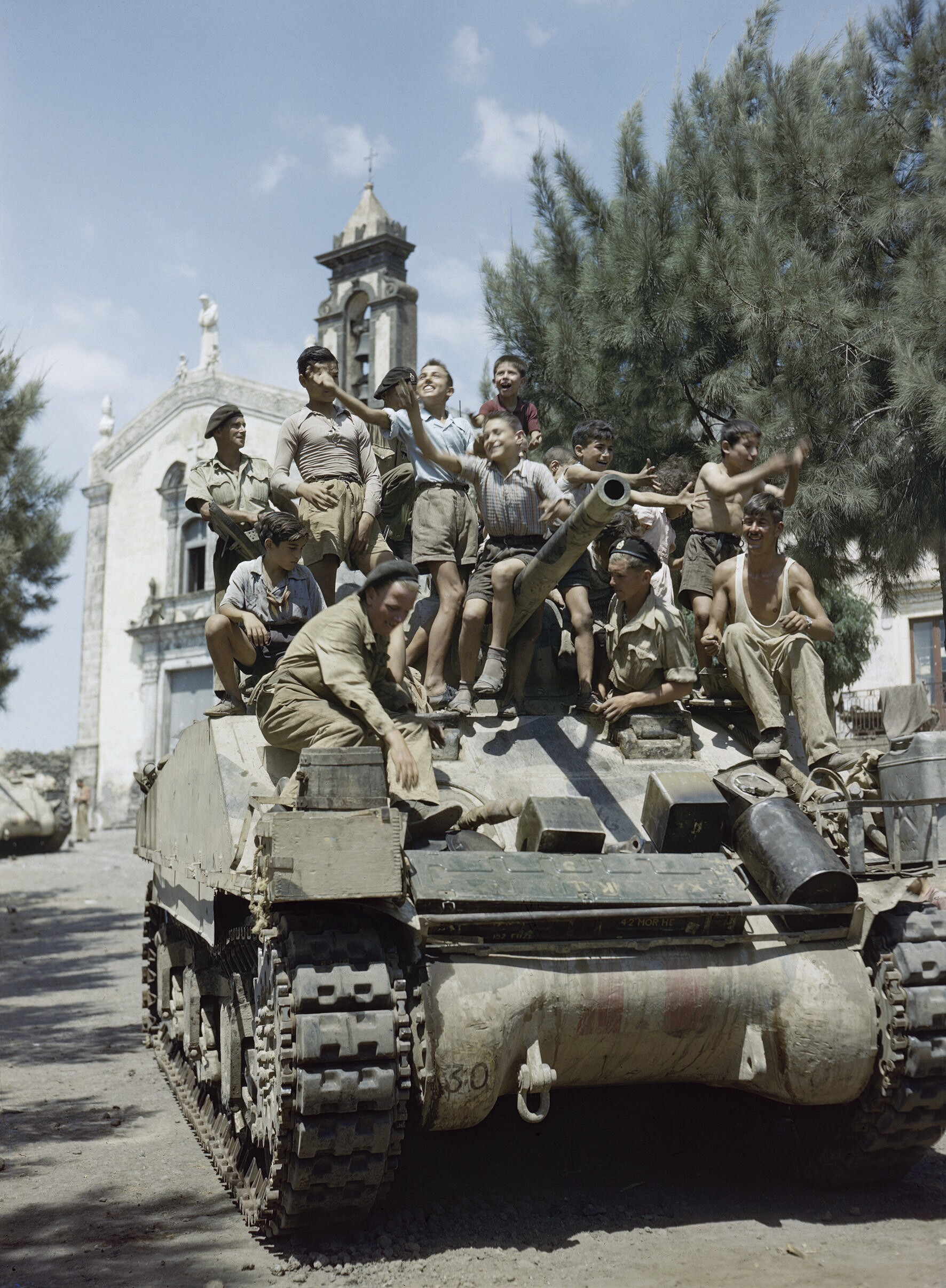
Belpasso, 1943: Tanks of the County of London Yeomanry, part of the British 4th Armoured Brigade, of the British Eighth Army, with local children on board. The facade of Chiesa Sant'Antonio da Padova is visible behind them.

Belpasso (formerly Malpasso; Sicilian: Malupassu or Marpassu) is a comune (municipality) in the Metropolitan City of Catania in the Italian region of Sicily, located about 150 kilometres (93 mi) southeast of Palermo and about 10 kilometres (6 mi) northwest of Catania. Belpasso is the second biggest comune of the Catania's area for area (after Catania).

The original town was destroyed by the lava flows from Mount Etna in 1669. Rebuilt in a lower plain, that habitation was known as Fenice Moncada; the latter name derives from the family of the Princes of Paterno who owned the feud. This habitation proved malarial and was heavily damaged by the 1693 Sicily earthquake, causing the spot to be abandoned and named Malpasso, and the present town was founded in 1695 in lands belonging to the Duke of Montalto.

Belpasso is the home to the Condorelli company producing typical Sicilian sweets, exported in all parts of the world. Condorelli is also the owner of a bar franchising, mainly located in the Metropolitan City of Catania.

Belpasso borders the following municipalities: Adrano, Biancavilla, Bronte, Camporotondo Etneo, Castiglione di Sicilia, Catania, Lentini, Maletto, Mascalucia, Motta Sant'Anastasia, Nicolosi, Paternò, Ragalna, Ramacca, Randazzo, San Pietro Clarenza, Sant'Alfio, and Zafferana Etnea.
