= Zafferana Etnea =

Town in eastern Sicily, Italy

Zafferana Etnea Zafarana (Sicilian)
- Comune
- Comune di Zafferana Etnea
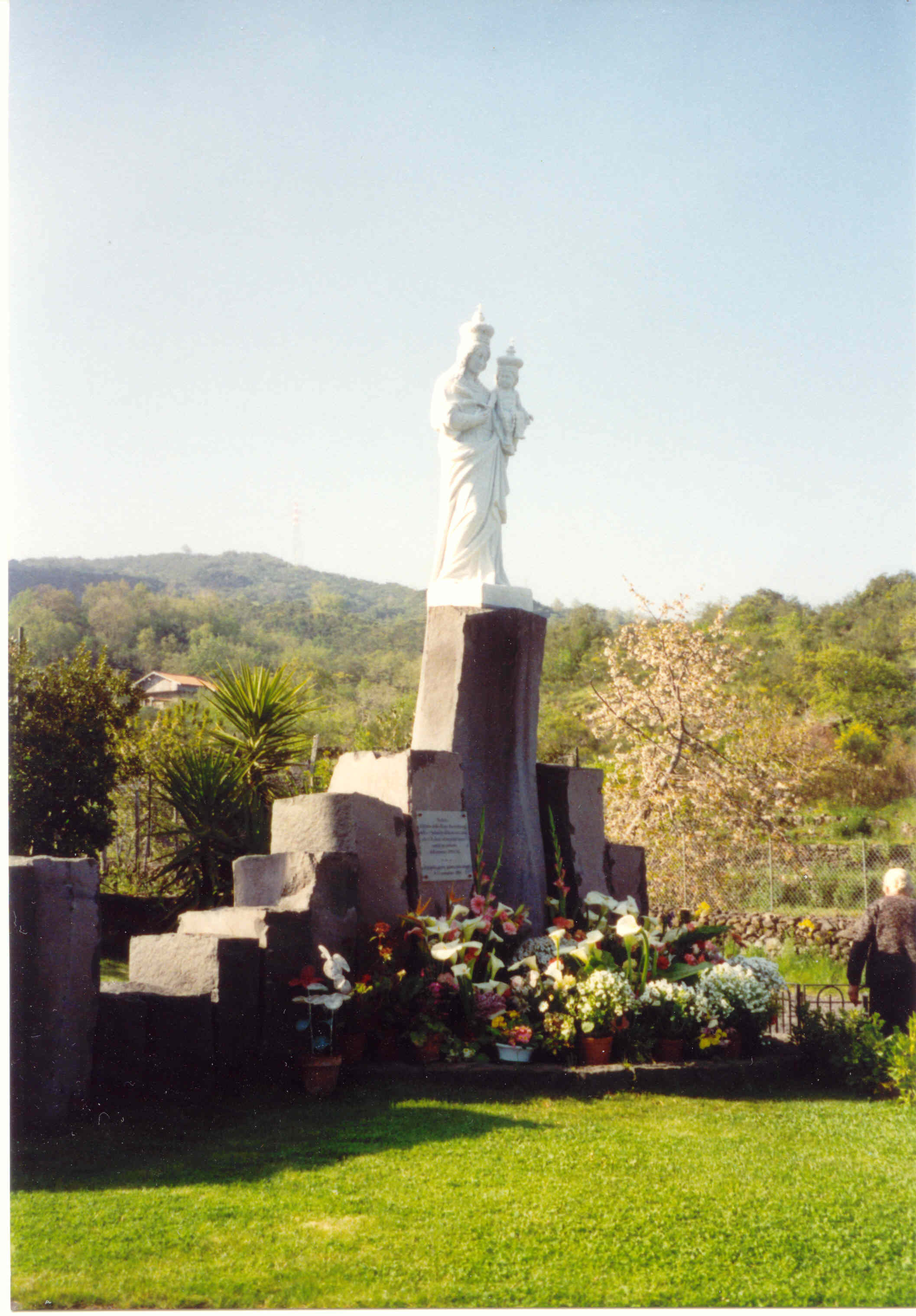
- Monument to the town in memory of surviving the lava flow

- Location within Italy Location within Sicily
- Coordinates: 37°41′N 15°6′E
- Country: Italy
- Region: Sicily
- Metropolitan city: Catania (CT)
- Frazioni: Fleri, Pisano, Petrulli; Sarro-Civita, Passopomo, Airone-Emmaus, Poggiofelice, Caselle

Government
  - Mayor: Salvatore Russo

Area
  - Total: 76.1 km^{2} (29.4 sq mi)
- Elevation: 574 m (1,883 ft)

Population (1 January 2015)
  - Total: 9,537
  - Density: 125/km^{2} (325/sq mi)
- Demonym: Zafferanesi
- Time zone: UTC+1 (CET)
  - Summer (DST): UTC+2 (CEST)
- Postal code: 95019
- Dialing code: 095
- Website: www.comune.zafferana-etnea.ct.it

Zafferana Etnea (Italian pronunciation: [dzaffeˈraːna etˈnɛːa]; Sicilian: Zafarana [tsafaˈɾaːna]) is a comune (municipality) in the Metropolitan City of Catania in the Italian region Sicily, located about 160 kilometres (99 mi) southeast of Palermo and about 20 kilometres (12 mi) north of Catania.

The municipality of Zafferana Etnea contains the frazioni (subdivisions, mainly villages and hamlets) Fleri, Pisano, Petrulli; Sarro-Civita, Passopomo, Airone-Emmaus, Poggiofelice, and Caselle.

Zafferana Etnea borders the following municipalities: Aci Sant'Antonio, Acireale, Adrano, Belpasso, Biancavilla, Bronte, Castiglione di Sicilia, Giarre, Maletto, Milo, Nicolosi, Pedara, Randazzo, Sant'Alfio, Santa Venerina, Trecastagni, Viagrande.

== History ==
The town spread around the Priory of San Giacomo, founded in 1387 in the upper part of the Valle del Bove, the point of confluence of the lava streams from Etna's eastern craters, which frequently have destroyed the town, which has always been rebuilt. Zafferana Etnea was threatened by the 1992 volcanic eruption of Mount Etna. It is now a summer resort with views of landscapes toward both the mountain and the sea.

== Culture ==
In August, every second Sunday of each year, Zafferana Etnea celebrates Festa della Madonna della Provvidenza. It is the most important religious and folkloric celebration of the year and celebrates the Patron Saint of Zafferana Etnea, "Madonna della Provvidenza".

In October, the municipality of Zafferana Etnea organises a unique festival called Ottobrata Zafferanese. It is celebrated every Sunday in October and is an opportunity to partake of local pastries and cakes as well as typical products of the city, such as grapes, bottled fruit, mushrooms, honey, liquor, wine, and chestnuts. Handcrafted products made by local artisans are also on display. The festival also presents exhibitions, documentaries about the Etna volcano, shows, and dance performances. The citizens of Zafferana Etnea start preparing in mid-September.

Zafferana, along with Nicolosi, is now regarded as a major tourist stopping point for summer and winter expeditions to the summit of Mt. Etna.

During the 1991–1993 eruption of Mount Etna, the town was seriously threatened by advancing lava flows. In April 1992, Italian civil protection authorities, assisted by the United States Marine Corps and United States Navy, carried out Operation Hot Rock, a joint mission that used explosives and concrete blocks to divert the lava away from Zafferana. The intervention succeeded in saving the town from destruction.

== Notable people ==
- Giuseppe Sciuti (1834–1911), painter
- Alfio Rapisarda (1933 - 2016), prelate
- Alfio Giuffrida (born 1953), painter and sculptor
- Rosario Di Bella (born 1963), singer and songwriter
