= Viagrande =

- Comune
- Comune di Viagrande
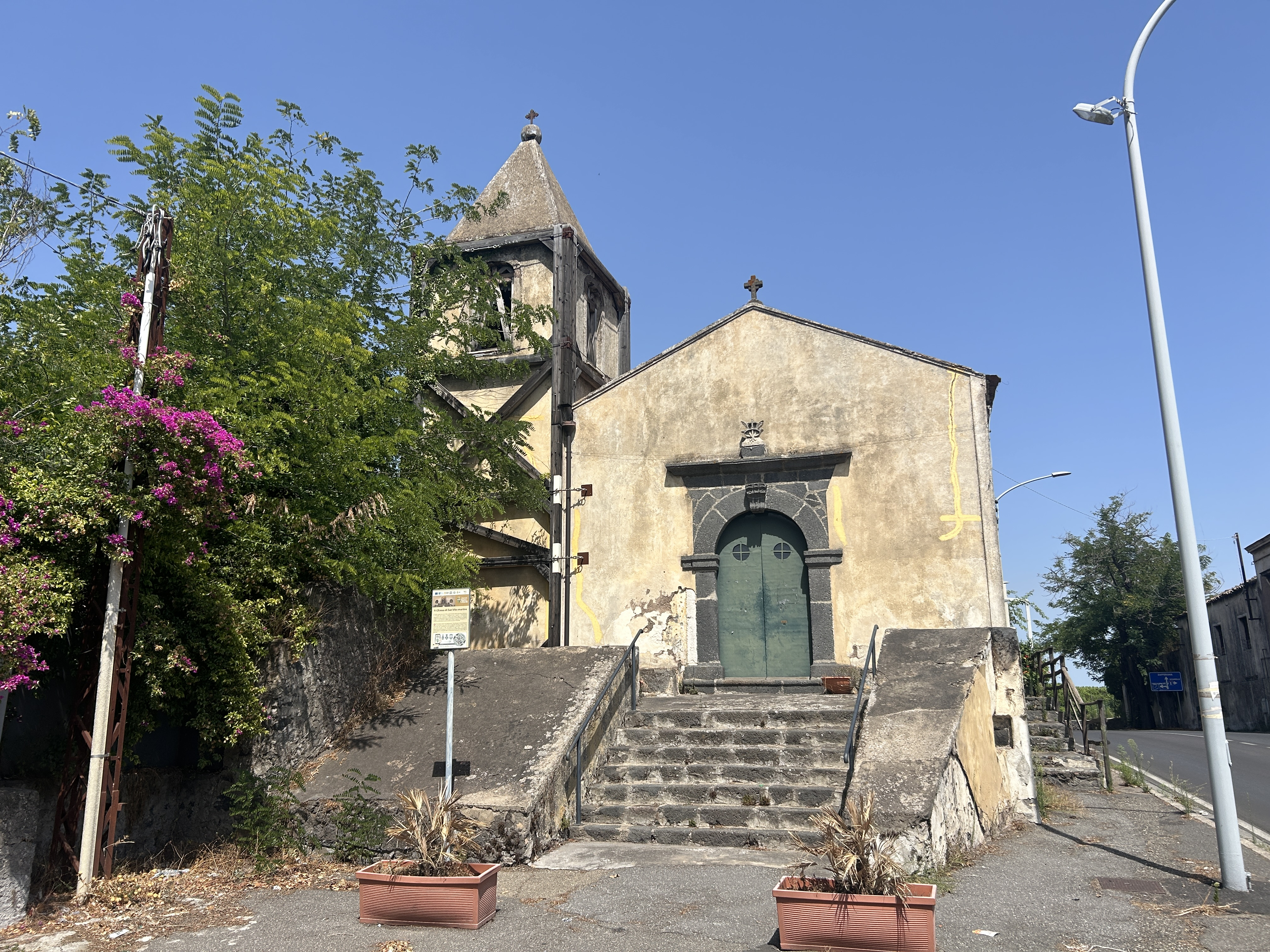

- Location within Italy Location within Sicily
- Coordinates: 37°37′N 15°6′E
- Country: Italy
- Region: Sicily
- Metropolitan city: Catania (CT)

Government
  - Mayor: Francesco Leonardi

Area
  - Total: 10.09 km^{2} (3.90 sq mi)
- Elevation: 410 m (1,350 ft)

Population (31 December 2016)
  - Total: 8,672
  - Density: 859.5/km^{2} (2,226/sq mi)
- Demonym: Viagrandesi
- Time zone: UTC+1 (CET)
  - Summer (DST): UTC+2 (CEST)
- Postal code: 95029
- Dialing code: 095
- Website: www.comune.viagrande.ct.it

Viagrande (Sicilian: Varanni) is a comune (municipality) in the Metropolitan City of Catania in the Italian region Sicily, located about 224 kilometres (139 mi) southeast of Palermo and about 15 kilometres (9 mi) north of Catania. Viagrande is 18 kilometres (11 mi) from the summit of Mount Etna, which lies to its north by northwest, although the road to the volcano's peak is 72 kilometres (45 mi) necessitating a nearly two-hour drive.

Viagrande borders the following municipalities: Aci Bonaccorsi, Aci Sant'Antonio, San Giovanni la Punta, Trecastagni, Zafferana Etnea.

== Gallery ==
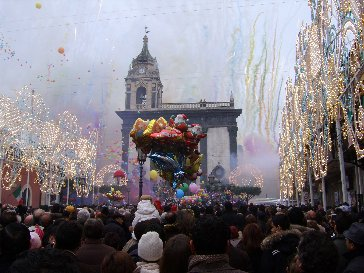

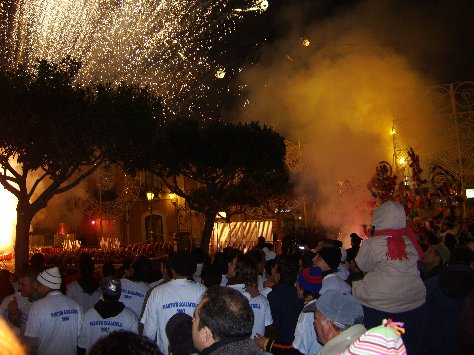

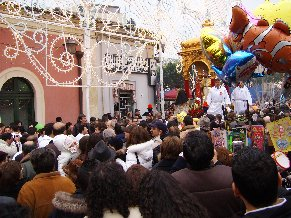

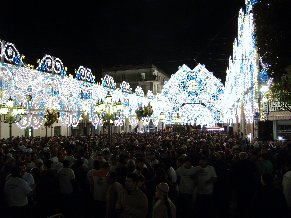
