= Gregoria (disambiguation) =

Gregoria can refer to:

== People ==
- Gregoria, Byzantine empress and wife of Constantine III.
- Gregoria Apaza (1751–1782), Bolivian indigenous leader.
- Gregoria Díaz (1964–2023), Venezuelan journalist.
- Gregoria Ferrer (born 1963), Spanish sprinter.
- Gregoria de Jesús (1875–1943), Filipina politician.
- Gregoria Mariska Tunjung (born 1999), Indonesian badminton player.
- Gregoria Montoya (1863–1896), Filipina revolutionary.
- Gregoria Ortega, Mexican American activist and religious sister.
- Archduchess Gregoria Maximiliana of Austria (1581–1597), member of the House of Habsburg.

== Biology ==
- Gregoria albocincta, species of sea anemone in the family Sagartiidae.
- Gregoria aretioides, species of flowering plant in the genus Dionysia.
- Gregoria fenestrata, species of sea anemone in the monotypic genus Gregoria.

== See also ==
- Gregorio (disambiguation)
