= San Giovanni la Punta =

- Comune
- Comune di San Giovanni la Punta
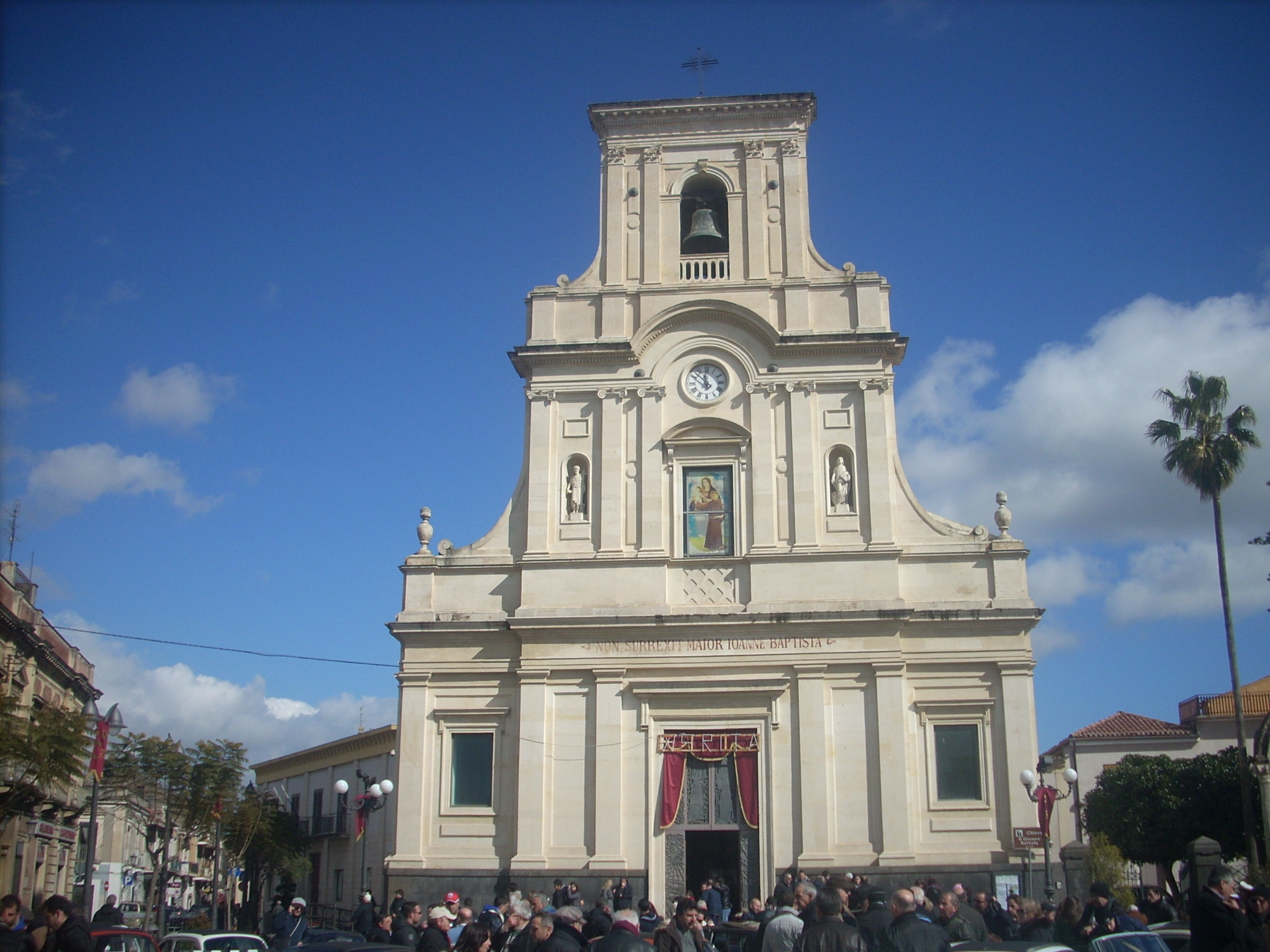
- Facade of the 14th century Duomo, located in San Giovanni la Punta's central square

- Coat of arms

- Location within Italy Location within Sicily
- Coordinates: 37°35′N 15°6′E
- Country: Italy
- Region: Sicily
- Metropolitan city: Catania (CT)
- Frazioni: Trappeto

Government
  - Mayor: Antonino Bellia

Area
  - Total: 10.6 km^{2} (4.1 sq mi)
- Elevation: 350 m (1,150 ft)

Population (31 December 2015)
  - Total: 23,060
  - Density: 2,180/km^{2} (5,630/sq mi)
- Demonym: Puntesi
- Time zone: UTC+1 (CET)
  - Summer (DST): UTC+2 (CEST)
- Postal code: 95037
- Dialing code: 095
- Patron saint: St. John the Evangelist
- Saint day: 27 December
- Website: www.sangiovannilapunta.gov.it

San Giovanni la Punta (Sicilian: San Giuvanni la Punta) is a comune (municipality) in the Metropolitan City of Catania in the Italian region of Sicily, located about 160 kilometres (99 mi) southeast of Palermo and about 8 kilometres (5 mi) northeast of Catania.

San Giovanni la Punta borders the following municipalities: Aci Bonaccorsi, Pedara, San Gregorio di Catania, Sant'Agata li Battiati, Trecastagni, Tremestieri Etneo, Valverde, and Viagrande.

== Famous people ==
- Gabriele Allegra, Blessed (1907–76)
- Lucia Mangano, Venerable (1896–1946)
- Carmen Consoli
