= Gravina di Catania =

- Comune
- Comune di Gravina di Catania
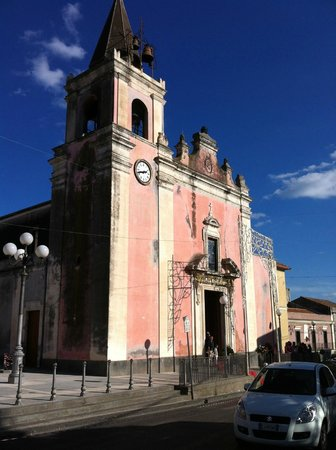
- Church of St. Anthony.

- Coat of arms

- Location within Italy Location within Sicily
- Coordinates: 37°34′N 15°4′E
- Country: Italy
- Region: Sicily
- Metropolitan city: Catania

Government
  - Mayor: Massimiliano Giammusso

Area
  - Total: 5.15 km^{2} (1.99 sq mi)
- Elevation: 355 m (1,165 ft)

Population (2026)
  - Total: 25,330
  - Density: 4,920/km^{2} (12,700/sq mi)
- Demonym: Gravinesi
- Time zone: UTC+1 (CET)
  - Summer (DST): UTC+2 (CEST)
- Postal code: 95030
- Dialing code: 095
- Website: www.comune.gravina-di-catania.ct.it

Gravina di Catania is a town and comune (municipality) in the Metropolitan City of Catania in the autonomous island region of Sicily in Italy, located about 160 kilometres (99 mi) southeast of Palermo and about 6 kilometres (4 mi) north of Catania. It has 25,330 inhabitants.

Gravina di Catania borders the municipalities of Catania, Mascalucia, Sant'Agata li Battiati, and Tremestieri Etneo.

== Demographics ==
As of 2026, the population is 25,330, of which 47.6% are male, and 52.4% are female. Minors make up 15.5% of the population, and seniors make up 25.1%.

Historical population

Year	Pop.	±%
1861	1,373	—
1871	1,440	+4.9%
1881	1,514	+5.1%
1901	1,764	+16.5%
1911	1,858	+5.3%
1921	1,970	+6.0%
1931	2,182	+10.8%
1936	2,321	+6.4%

Year	Pop.	±%
1951	2,557	+10.2%
1961	2,972	+16.2%
1971	8,537	+187.2%
1981	23,930	+180.3%
1991	26,627	+11.3%
2001	27,343	+2.7%
2011	26,543	−2.9%
2021	25,156	−5.2%

Source: ISTAT

=== Immigration ===
As of 2025, of the known countries of birth of 25,149 residents, the most numerous are: Italy (24,704 – 98.2%).
