= Scordia =

Scordia Skordía (Greek)
- Comune
- Comune di Scordia
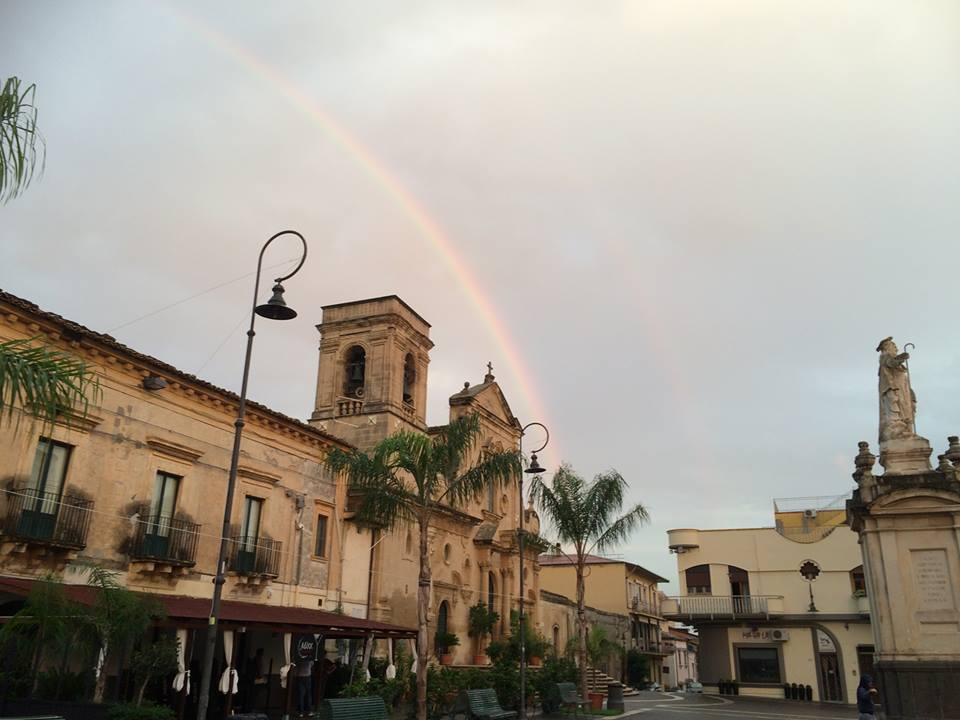
- Piazza Umberto.

- Location within Italy Location within Sicily
- Coordinates: 37°18′N 14°51′E
- Country: Italy
- Region: Sicily
- Metropolitan city: Catania (CT)

Government
  - Mayor: Francesco Barchitta

Area
  - Total: 24.3 km^{2} (9.4 sq mi)
- Elevation: 150 m (490 ft)

Population (31 January 2014)
  - Total: 17,205
  - Density: 708/km^{2} (1,830/sq mi)
- Demonym: Scordiensi (or Scordienzi)
- Time zone: UTC+1 (CET)
  - Summer (DST): UTC+2 (CEST)
- Postal code: 95048
- Dialing code: 095
- Patron saint: San Rocco
- Saint day: 16 August
- Website: www.comune.scordia.ct.it

Scordia (Sicilian: Scurdìa) is a comune (municipality) in the Metropolitan City of Catania in the Italian region Sicily, located about 160 kilometres (99 mi) southeast of Palermo and about 30 kilometres (19 mi) southwest of Catania.

Scordia borders the following municipalities: Lentini, Militello in Val di Catania.
