= Metropolitan City of Catania =

Metropolitan City of Catania Città metropolitana di Catania (Italian) Citati metrupulitana di Catania (Sicilian)
- Metropolitan city
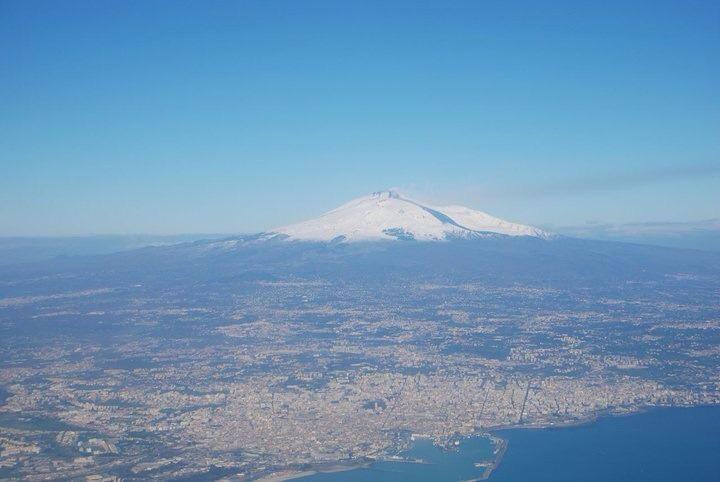
- An aerial view of the metropolitan city around Catania. Mount Etna is the peak at a distance.

- Coat of arms

- Location of the Metropolitan City of Catania in Italy
- Coordinates: 37°31′00″N 15°04′00″E
- Country: Italy
- Region: Sicily
- Established: 4 August 2015
- Capital(s): Catania
- Municipalities: 58

Government
  - Metropolitan mayor: Enrico Trantino

Area
  - Total: 3,573.68 km^{2} (1,379.81 sq mi)

Population (2026)
  - Total: 1,067,550
  - Density: 298.726/km^{2} (773.696/sq mi)

GDP
  - Metro: €19.045 billion (2015)
  - Per capita: €17,384 (2015)
- Time zone: UTC+1 (CET)
  - Summer (DST): UTC+2 (CEST)
- Postal code: 95100 (Catania); 95010 - 95049 (other municipalities)
- Telephone prefix: 095, 0933, 0942
- ISO 3166 code: IT-CT
- Vehicle registration: CT
- ISTAT code: 287
- Website: Official website

The Metropolitan City of Catania (Italian: città metropolitana di Catania) is a metropolitan city in the autonomous island region of Sicily in Italy. Its capital is the city of Catania. It replaced the province of Catania and comprises the city of Catania and 57 other municipalities. With a population of 1,067,550, it is the 7th most populated metropolitan city in the country.

== History ==
The Metropolitan City of Catania was first created by the reform of local authorities (Law 142/1990) and then established by the regional law 15 August 2015.

== Geography ==
The metropolitan city borders with the Metropolitan City of Messina (the former province of Messina), the province of Enna, the province of Syracuse, the province of Ragusa and the province of Caltanissetta. Part of its territory includes the Metropolitan area of Catania.

The metropolitan city faces the Ionian Sea to the east, the Metropolitan City of Messina to the north, the province of Enna and the province of Caltanissetta to the west, and the province of Siracusa and the province of Ragusa to the south. Mount Etna, Europe's largest active volcano, is located in the province.

== Government ==
=== List of metropolitan mayors ===
Metropolitan Mayor		Term start	Term end	Party
1	Enzo Bianco	8 June 2016	18 June 2018	Democratic Party
2	Salvo Pogliese	18 June 2018	24 January 2022	Forza Italia / Brothers of Italy
3	Enrico Trantino	5 June 2023	Incumbent	Brothers of Italy

=== Municipalities ===
The province has 58 municipalities:

- Aci Bonaccorsi
- Aci Castello
- Aci Catena
- Aci Sant'Antonio
- Acireale
- Adrano
- Belpasso
- Biancavilla
- Bronte
- Calatabiano
- Caltagirone
- Camporotondo Etneo
- Castel di Iudica
- Castiglione di Sicilia
- Catania
- Fiumefreddo di Sicilia
- Giarre
- Grammichele
- Gravina di Catania
- Licodia Eubea
- Linguaglossa
- Maletto
- Maniace
- Mascali
- Mascalucia
- Mazzarrone
- Militello in Val di Catania
- Milo
- Mineo
- Mirabella Imbaccari
- Misterbianco
- Motta Sant'Anastasia
- Nicolosi
- Palagonia
- Paternò
- Pedara
- Piedimonte Etneo
- Raddusa
- Ragalna
- Ramacca
- Randazzo
- Riposto
- San Cono
- San Giovanni la Punta
- San Gregorio di Catania
- San Michele di Ganzaria
- San Pietro Clarenza
- Sant'Agata li Battiati
- Sant'Alfio
- Santa Maria di Licodia
- Santa Venerina
- Scordia
- Trecastagni
- Tremestieri Etneo
- Valverde
- Viagrande
- Vizzini
- Zafferana Etnea

== Demographics ==
As of 2026, the population is 1,067,550, of which 48.7% are male, and 51.3% are female. Minors make up 16.6% of the population, and seniors make up 23.0%.

Historical population

Year	Pop.	±%
1861	369,923	—
1871	410,711	+11.0%
1881	469,242	+14.3%
1901	590,182	+25.8%
1911	681,214	+15.4%
1921	766,366	+12.5%
1931	683,430	−10.8%
1936	713,131	+4.3%

Year	Pop.	±%
1951	800,051	+12.2%
1961	893,542	+11.7%
1971	938,273	+5.0%
1981	1,005,577	+7.2%
1991	1,035,665	+3.0%
2001	1,054,778	+1.8%
2011	1,078,766	+2.3%
2021	1,077,515	−0.1%

Source: ISTAT

=== Immigration ===
As of 2025, immigrants make up 5.1% of the total population. The 5 largest foreign countries of birth are Romania, Germany, Switzerland, Sri Lanka, and Albania.

== See also ==
- Province of Catania
