= Trecastagni =

- Comune
- Comune di Trecastagni
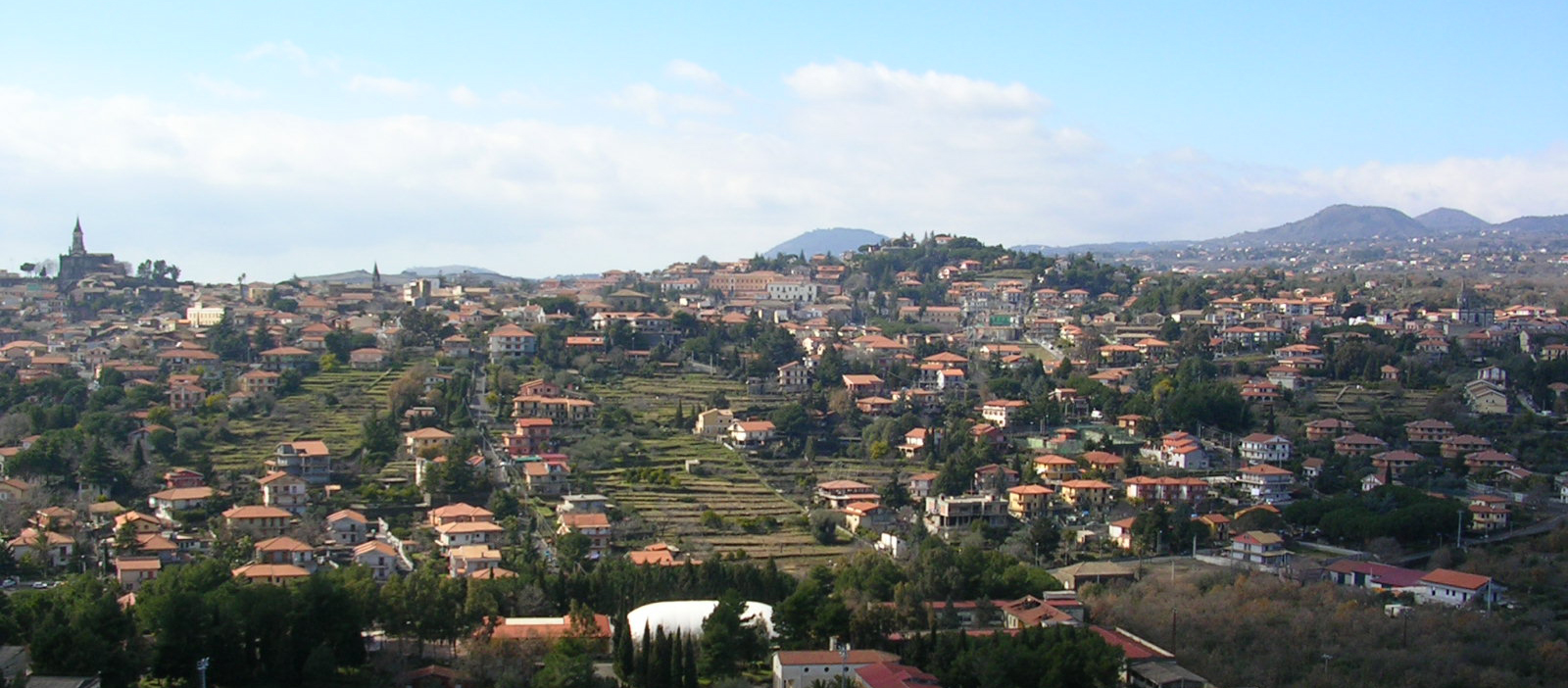

- Location within Italy Location within Sicily
- Coordinates: 37°37′N 15°5′E
- Country: Italy
- Region: Sicily
- Metropolitan city: Catania (CT)

Government
  - Mayor: Commissar

Area
  - Total: 19.0 km^{2} (7.3 sq mi)
- Elevation: 586 m (1,923 ft)

Population (31 December 2016)
  - Total: 10,985
  - Density: 578/km^{2} (1,500/sq mi)
- Demonym: Trecastagnesi
- Time zone: UTC+1 (CET)
  - Summer (DST): UTC+2 (CEST)
- Postal code: 95039
- Dialing code: 095
- Patron saint: Saints Nicholas, Alphius, Philadelphus and Cyrinus
- Saint day: Saint Nicholas 6 December; Alphius, Philadelphus and Cyrinus 10 May
- Website: www.comune.trecastagni.ct.it

Trecastagni (Sicilian: Triccastagni) is a comune (municipality) in the Metropolitan City of Catania in the Italian region Sicily, located about 160 kilometres (99 mi) southeast of Palermo and about 11 kilometres (7 mi) north of Catania.

Trecastagni borders the following municipalities: Pedara, San Giovanni la Punta, Viagrande, Zafferana Etnea.
