= San Cono, Sicily =

San Cono Santu Conu (Sicilian)
- Comune
- Comune di San Cono
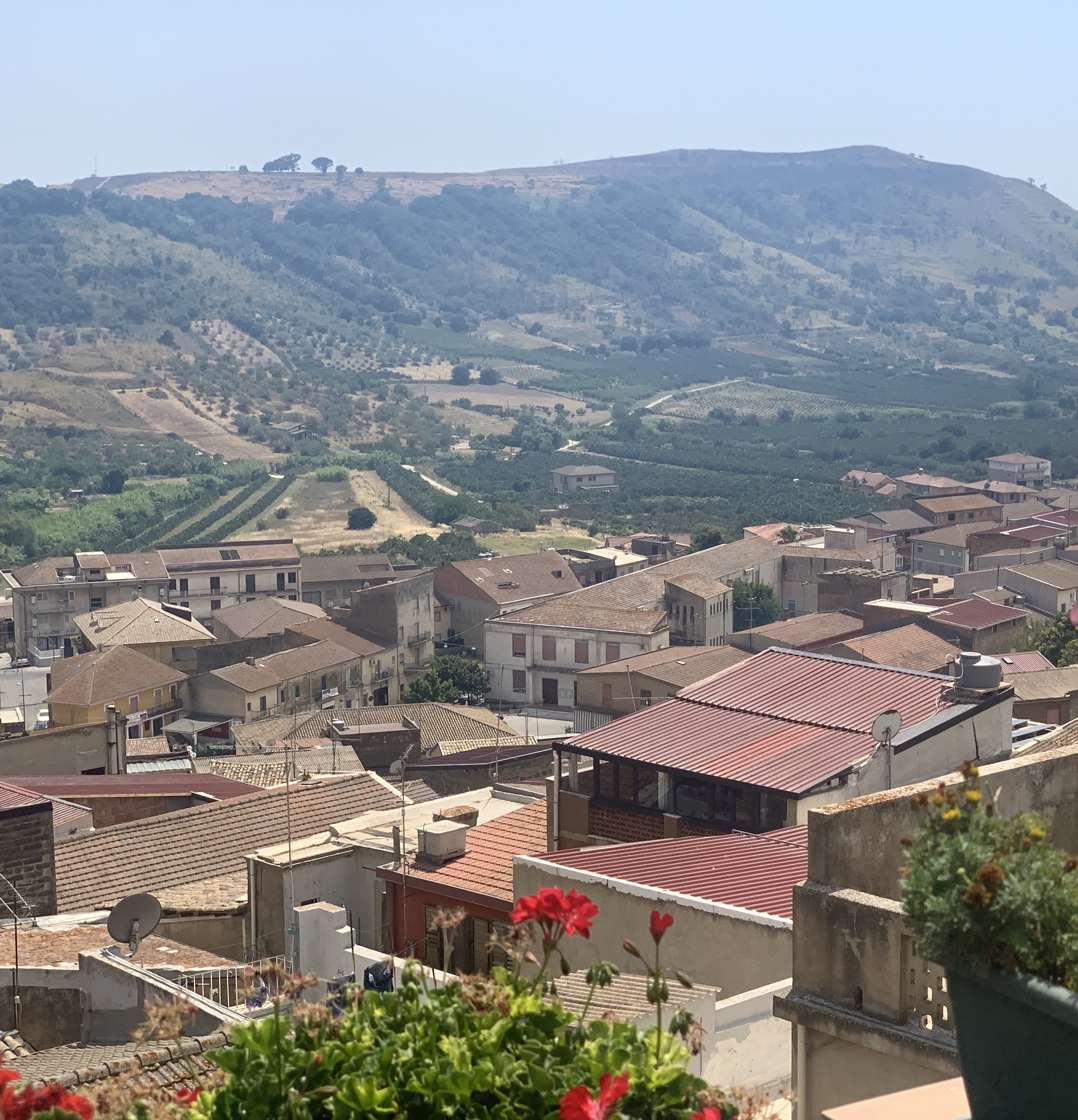
- San Cono viewed from a balcony near Chiesa Madre

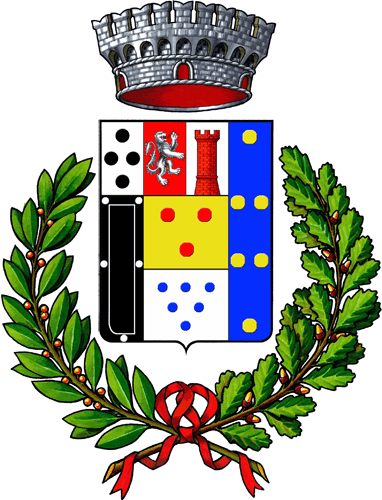
- Coat of arms

- San Cono within the Province of Catania

- Location within Italy Location within Sicily
- Coordinates: 37°17′N 14°22′E
- Country: Italy
- Region: Sicily
- Metropolitan city: Catania (CT)

Government
  - Mayor: Salvatore Barbera

Area
  - Total: 6.56 km^{2} (2.53 sq mi)
- Elevation: 525 m (1,722 ft)

Population (30 October 2012)
  - Total: 2,764
  - Density: 421/km^{2} (1,090/sq mi)
- Demonym: Sanconesi
- Time zone: UTC+1 (CET)
  - Summer (DST): UTC+2 (CEST)
- Postal code: 95040
- Dialing code: 0933
- Patron saint: Conon of Naso
- Website: www.comune.sancono.ct.it

San Cono (Sicilian: Santu Conu) is a small village and comune in the Metropolitan City of Catania on the island of Sicily, southern Italy. It is an agricultural community, and is known particularly for its production of prickly pears.

== Geography ==
Located in the south-eastern corner of the province, close to the provinces of Caltanissetta and Enna, San Cono borders with the municipalities of Mazzarino (CL), Piazza Armerina (EN) and San Michele di Ganzaria.

== History ==
The town was named San Cono in 1785 by its founder, the Duke of Trigona Marquis Ottavio Trigona Bellotti. In 1883, the territory was divided into several parts and rented to the town's inhabitants. The town belonged to the Trigona family until the abolition of feudal rights.

The town is named after San Cono Abate, although the reason for naming the town after this saint is not clear; according to Jesuit Father Ignazio Mario Piccolo, the fiefdom "was named after San Cono because it was first owned by the Santapau family, who were decedents of the Saint" and the same is reported by the historian Carlo Incudine. Although there are no documents to prove this hypothesis. Ottavio Trigona (although busy with the administration of Piazza Armerina, the neighbouring town) never neglected the interests of the feud of San Cono.

To further explain the name of the town and the historically uncertain reasons of the foundation, there is a popular legend. It is said that one day the Marquis Trigona received a visit from a Friar of Naso who belonged to the Order of St. Basil to buy a large amount of wheat. Not being able to pay in full, the Friar left a precious ring he wore on his finger as a pledge to the Marquis, with the promise that he would then pay the debt. He then loaded the grain onto the mule and left. But after a long period of time the Marquis, having no longer been visited by the monk (and beginning to doubt his good faith), decided to go personally to Naso to ask for information; yet no one was able to tell him anything about the Friar. Once he began his return, on a wall of a Convent, he found the monk depicted in a picture. It was San Cono, who died more than five centuries earlier. Convinced that he witnessed a miracle, he decided to found the town and give it the name of the saint.

The Marquis had a church and 60 houses built at his own expense, where he welcomed people from all over Sicily with the promise of a house and a piece of land to cultivate; therefore, many men who had problems with the law replied to the marquis's proclamation to rebuild their lives. Ottavio Trigona asked and obtained a "licentia populandi"(This was a concession or permit by the Kingdom of Sicily, for barons or feudal lords to allow them the privilege of populating a feud. Shortly after, he provided the means for the construction of the Church of San Cono.

== Main sights ==
The Monument to the Fallen is situated in the centre of the public square. It was constructed between 1967 and 1968 to commemorate those who lost their lives in Second World War. Chiesa Madre is the town's oldest church, presumably dating back to the 18th century. The altar has a statue of Saint Cono, and the Trigona coat of arms carved into the sides. The church's ceiling features paintings representing the life of the saint.

The Palace Trigona was built by the Trigona family as a seasonal residence in the center of the fiefdom of San Cono Soprano with an animation of the peasants and the person in charge of the small block. Around it, where "U Bagghiu" was born in the center, there are the stables and warehouses with a watering trough for the animals whose water is tested by the Vallone Mira. Today the Trigona palace is found to be divided into various owners, who over the years have made profound changes without taking into account its historical and cultural value.

== Culture ==
The patronal feast of St. Cono Abbate is held on the second and third weekends of May. A major festival in San Cono is the "Sagra del Fico d'India" (which translates to the Festival of the Prickly Pears), held on the first Sunday in October each year.
