= Aci Bonaccorsi =

Aci Bonaccorsi Jaci Bonaccossi (Sicilian)
- Comune
- Comune di Aci Bonaccorsi
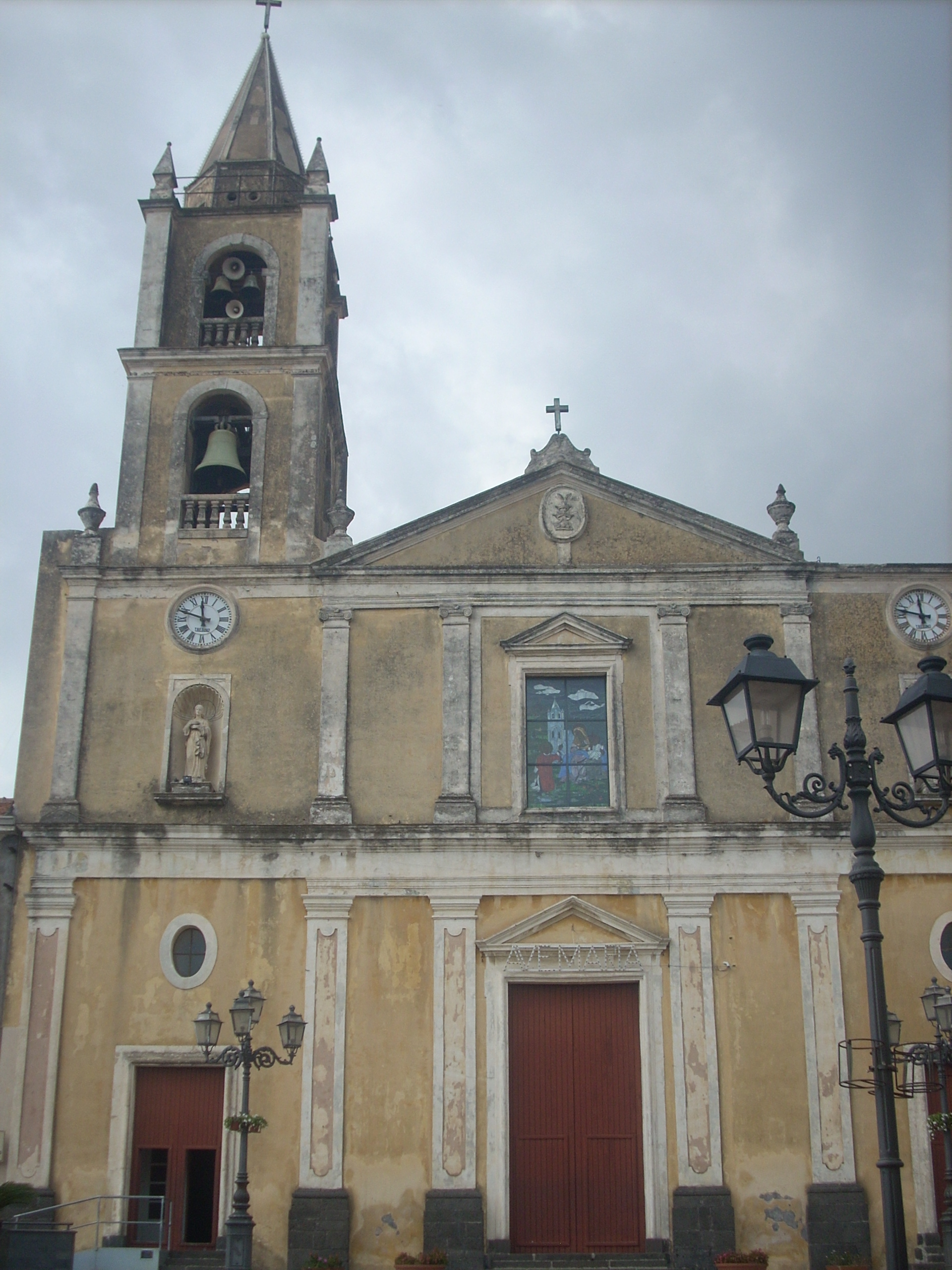
- Santa Maria dell'Indirizzo Church, dating from the 15th century.

- Location of Aci Bonaccorsi in Italy Aci Bonaccorsi (Sicily)
- Coordinates: 37°36′N 15°7′E
- Country: Italy
- Region: Sicily
- Metropolitan city: Catania (CT)

Government
  - Mayor: Vito Di Mauro

Area
  - Total: 1.72 km^{2} (0.66 sq mi)
- Elevation: 365 m (1,198 ft)

Population (2026)
  - Total: 3,559
  - Density: 2,070/km^{2} (5,360/sq mi)
- Demonym: Bonaccorsesi
- Time zone: UTC+1 (CET)
  - Summer (DST): UTC+2 (CEST)
- Postal code: 95020
- Dialing code: 095
- Patron saint: St. Stephen
- Saint day: 31 July 2016
- Website: www.comune.acibonaccorsi.ct-egov.it

Aci Bonaccorsi (Sicilian: Jaci Bonaccossi) is a town and comune (municipality) in the Metropolitan City of Catania in the autonomous island region of Sicily in Italy, located about 220 kilometres (140 mi) southeast of Palermo and about 10 kilometres (6 mi) northeast of Catania. It has 3,559 inhabitants.

Aci Bonaccorsi borders the municipalities of Aci Sant'Antonio, San Giovanni la Punta, Valverde, and Viagrande.

== Demographics ==
As of 2026, the population is 3,559, of which 47.5% are male, and 52.5% are female. Minors make up 16.5% of the population, and seniors make up 21.7%.

Historical population

| Year | Pop. | ±% |
|---|---|---|
| 1861 | 1,222 | — |
| 1871 | 1,344 | +10.0% |
| 1881 | 1,492 | +11.0% |
| 1901 | 1,614 | +8.2% |
| 1911 | 1,651 | +2.3% |
| 1921 | 1,614 | −2.2% |
| 1931 | 1,694 | +5.0% |
| 1936 | 1,739 | +2.7% |

| Year | Pop. | ±% |
|---|---|---|
| 1951 | 1,693 | −2.6% |
| 1961 | 1,910 | +12.8% |
| 1971 | 2,048 | +7.2% |
| 1981 | 2,223 | +8.5% |
| 1991 | 2,360 | +6.2% |
| 2001 | 2,549 | +8.0% |
| 2011 | 3,200 | +25.5% |
| 2021 | 3,525 | +10.2% |

Source: ISTAT

=== Immigration ===
As of 2025, immigrants make up 2.5% of the total population. The 5 largest foreign countries of birth are Albania, Germany, Romania, Russia, and Switzerland.
