= San Michele di Ganzaria =

San Michele di Ganzaria Shën Mikelli (Arbëresh language)
- Comune
- Comune di San Michele di Ganzaria
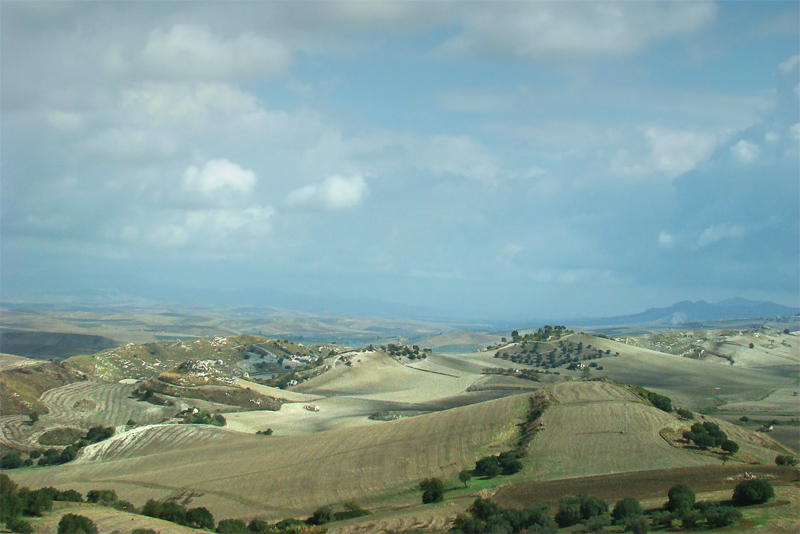
- In the vicinity of San Michele di Ganzaria

- Location within Italy Location within Sicily
- Coordinates: 37°17′N 14°26′E
- Country: Italy
- Region: Sicily
- Metropolitan city: Catania (CT)

Government
  - Mayor: Danilo Parasole

Area
  - Total: 25.6 km^{2} (9.9 sq mi)
- Elevation: 490 m (1,610 ft)

Population (30 May 2012)
  - Total: 3,483
  - Density: 136/km^{2} (352/sq mi)
- Demonym: Sammichelesi
- Time zone: UTC+1 (CET)
  - Summer (DST): UTC+2 (CEST)
- Postal code: 95040
- Dialing code: 0933
- Website: www.comune.sanmichelediganzaria.ct.it

San Michele di Ganzaria (Sicilian: San Micheli di Ganzarìa; Arbëreshë Albanian: Shën Mikelli) is a comune (municipality) in the Metropolitan City of Catania in the Italian region Sicily, located about 130 kilometres (81 mi) southeast of Palermo and about 60 kilometres (37 mi) southwest of Catania. The town was settled and historically inhabited by the Arbëreshë community.

San Michele di Ganzaria borders the following municipalities: Caltagirone, Mazzarino, Piazza Armerina, San Cono. The painter and artist, Rosetta Lavatura was born in the comune in 1944.
