= Gregorio (cardinal) =

Gregorio Papareschi was an Italian cardinal-nephew created by Pope Innocent II ca. 1138. He was possibly the Pope's nephew. He subscribed the papal bulls between 18 June 1135 and 30 June 1137, and died probably in 1141.

== Sources ==
- Miranda, Salvador (2016). "GREGORIO (?-ca. 1138)". The Cardinals of the Holy Roman Church. Florida International University Libraries. OCLC 53276621.
- J. M. Brixius, Die Mitglieder des Kardinalkollegiums von 1130-1181 Berlin 1912, p. 42 no. 16
