= Tremestieri Etneo =

- Comune
- Comune di Tremestieri Etneo
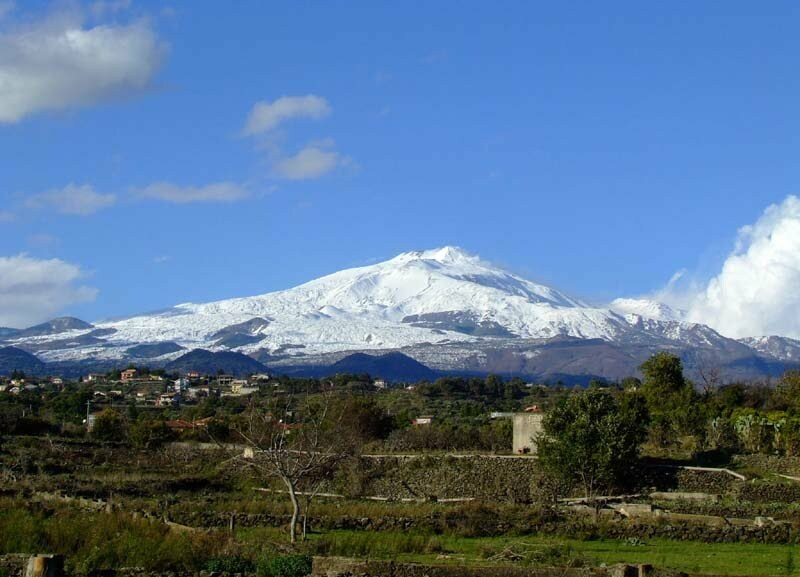
- Mount Etna seen from Tremestieri

- Coat of arms

- Location within Italy Location within Sicily
- Coordinates: 37°35′N 15°5′E
- Country: Italy
- Region: Sicily
- Metropolitan city: Catania (CT)
- Frazioni: Canalicchio

Government
  - Mayor: Santi Rando (Civic List)

Area
  - Total: 6.52 km^{2} (2.52 sq mi)
- Elevation: 400 m (1,300 ft)

Population (31 October 2017)
  - Total: 20,386
  - Density: 3,130/km^{2} (8,100/sq mi)
- Demonym: Tremestieresi
- Time zone: UTC+1 (CET)
  - Summer (DST): UTC+2 (CEST)
- Postal code: 95030
- Dialing code: 095
- Website: www.comune.tremestieri.ct.it

Tremestieri Etneo (Sicilian: Trimmisteri) is a comune (municipality) in the Metropolitan City of Catania in the Italian region Sicily, located about 160 kilometres (99 mi) southeast of Palermo and about 8 kilometres (5 mi) north of Catania.

Tremestieri Etneo borders the following municipalities: Catania, Gravina di Catania, Mascalucia, Pedara, San Giovanni la Punta, San Gregorio di Catania, Sant'Agata li Battiati.
