= ASD Club Calcio San Gregorio =

Italian football club

San Gregorio
- Full name: A.S.D. Club Calcio San Gregorio
- Founded: 1972 (as Pol. San Gregorio); 1980 (as C.C.San Gregorio)
- Ground: Comunale, San Gregorio di Catania, Italy
- League: Promozione
Home colours	Away colours

San Gregorio Calcio is an Italian association football team based in San Gregorio di Catania. It currently plays in Promozione. It was founded in 1972 as Polisportiva San Gregorio. In 1972–73 the club played in "Terza Categoria" and played its home matches at "Piano Immacolata" soccer field.

In November 1974 was inaugurated a new stadium, the "Comunale" stadium in Via Vincenzo Bellini. In July 1980, the club merged with Massimiliana becoming the Club Calcio San gregorio. In May 2004 San Gregorio won the Sicilian Cup in Torre Grotta. At the end of 2003–04 season the team was promoted in the "Promozione" championship.
