= Mirabella Imbaccari =

Mirabella Imbaccari Imichára (Greek)
- Comune
- Comune di Mirabella Imbaccari
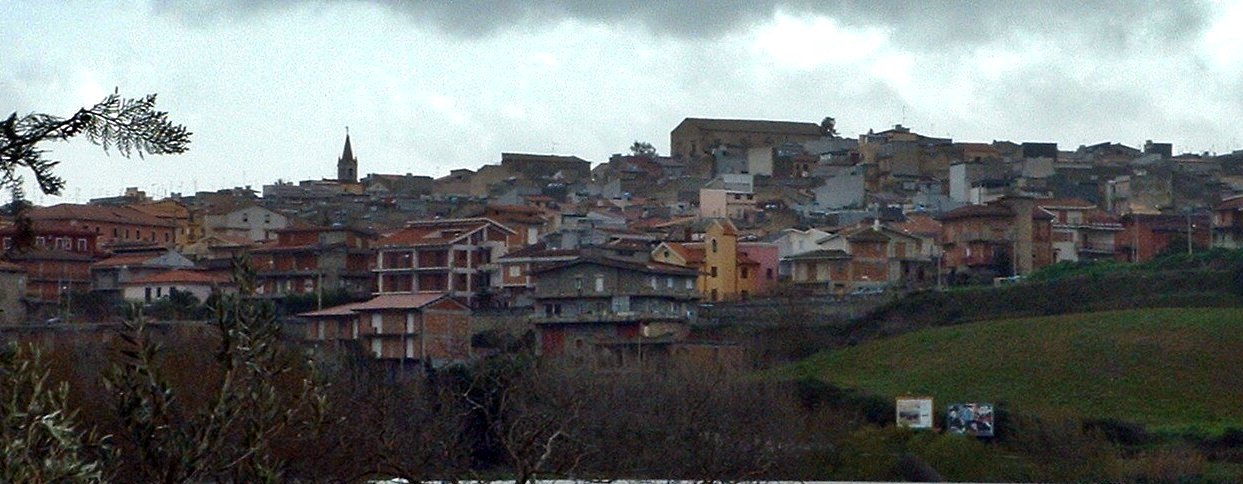

- Location within Italy Location within Sicily
- Coordinates: 37°20′N 14°27′E
- Country: Italy
- Region: Sicily
- Metropolitan city: Catania (CT)

Government
  - Mayor: Giovanni Ferro

Area
  - Total: 15.3 km^{2} (5.9 sq mi)
- Elevation: 518 m (1,699 ft)

Population (31 October 2017)
  - Total: 4,772
  - Density: 312/km^{2} (808/sq mi)
- Demonym: Mirabellesi
- Time zone: UTC+1 (CET)
  - Summer (DST): UTC+2 (CEST)
- Postal code: 95040
- Dialing code: 0933
- Website: www.comune.mirabellaimbaccari.ct.it

Mirabella Imbaccari (Sicilian: Màcara; Latin: Imachara and Imacara) is a comune (municipality) in the Metropolitan City of Catania in the Italian region Sicily, located about 130 kilometres (81 mi) southeast of Palermo and about 60 kilometres (37 mi) southwest of Catania.

Mirabella Imbaccari borders the municipalities of Caltagirone and Piazza Armerina.
