= Sant'Agata li Battiati =

- Comune
- Comune di Sant'Agata li Battiati
- Coat of arms

- Location within Italy Location within Sicily
- Coordinates: 37°31′N 15°4′E
- Country: Italy
- Region: Sicily
- Metropolitan city: Catania (CT)

Government
  - Mayor: Marco Rubino

Area
  - Total: 3.1 km^{2} (1.2 sq mi)
- Elevation: 320 m (1,050 ft)

Population (1 January 2015)
  - Total: 9,546
  - Density: 3,100/km^{2} (8,000/sq mi)
- Demonym: Battiatoti
- Time zone: UTC+1 (CET)
  - Summer (DST): UTC+2 (CEST)
- Postal code: 95030
- Dialing code: 095
- Website: Official website

Sant'Agata li Battiati (Sicilian: Sant'Àita li Vattiati) is a comune (municipality) in the Metropolitan City of Catania in the Italian region Sicily, located very near to Catania.

Sant'Agata li Battiati borders the following municipalities: Catania, Gravina di Catania, San Giovanni la Punta, Tremestieri Etneo.
