= Mascalucia =

- Comune
- Comune di Mascalucia
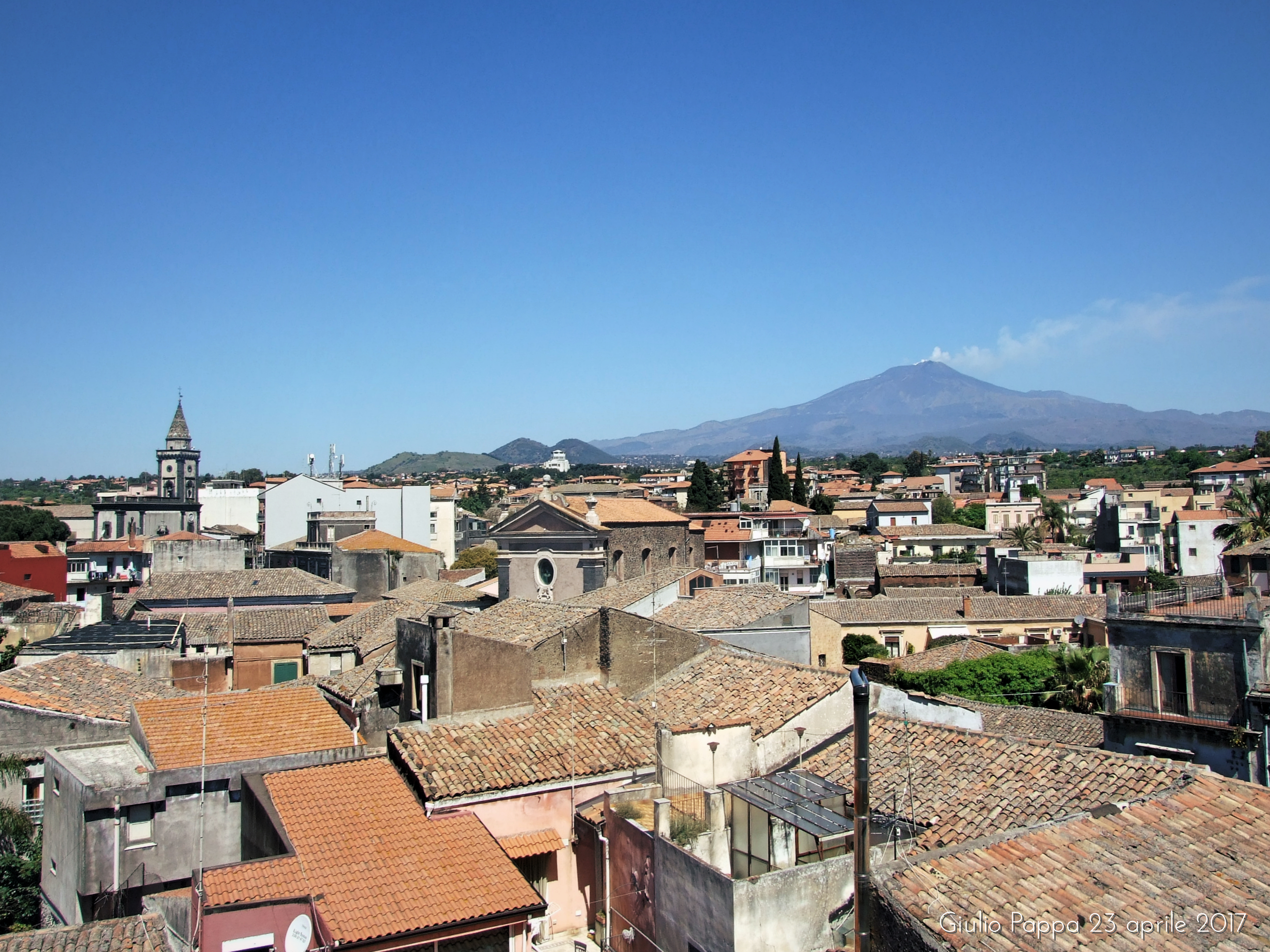

- Location within Italy Location within Sicily
- Country: Italy
- Region: Sicily
- Metropolitan city: Catania (CT)

Government
  - Mayor: Vincenzo Antonio Magra

Area
  - Total: 16.28 km^{2} (6.29 sq mi)
- Elevation: 420 m (1,380 ft)

Population (30 September 2017)
  - Total: 32,179
  - Density: 1,977/km^{2} (5,119/sq mi)
- Demonym: Mascaluciesi
- Time zone: UTC+1 (CET)
  - Summer (DST): UTC+2 (CEST)
- Postal code: 95030
- Dialing code: 095
- Website: www.comune.mascalucia.ct.it

Mascalucia (Sicilian: Mascalucìa) is a comune (municipality) in the Metropolitan City of Catania in the Italian region Sicily, located about 160 kilometres (99 mi) southeast of Palermo and about 6 kilometres (4 mi) north of Catania.

Mascalucia borders the following municipalities: Belpasso, Catania, Gravina di Catania, Nicolosi, Pedara, San Pietro Clarenza, Tremestieri Etneo. It is also the most populated Comune of Catania's province.
