= Santa Venerina =

- Comune
- Comune di Santa Venerina
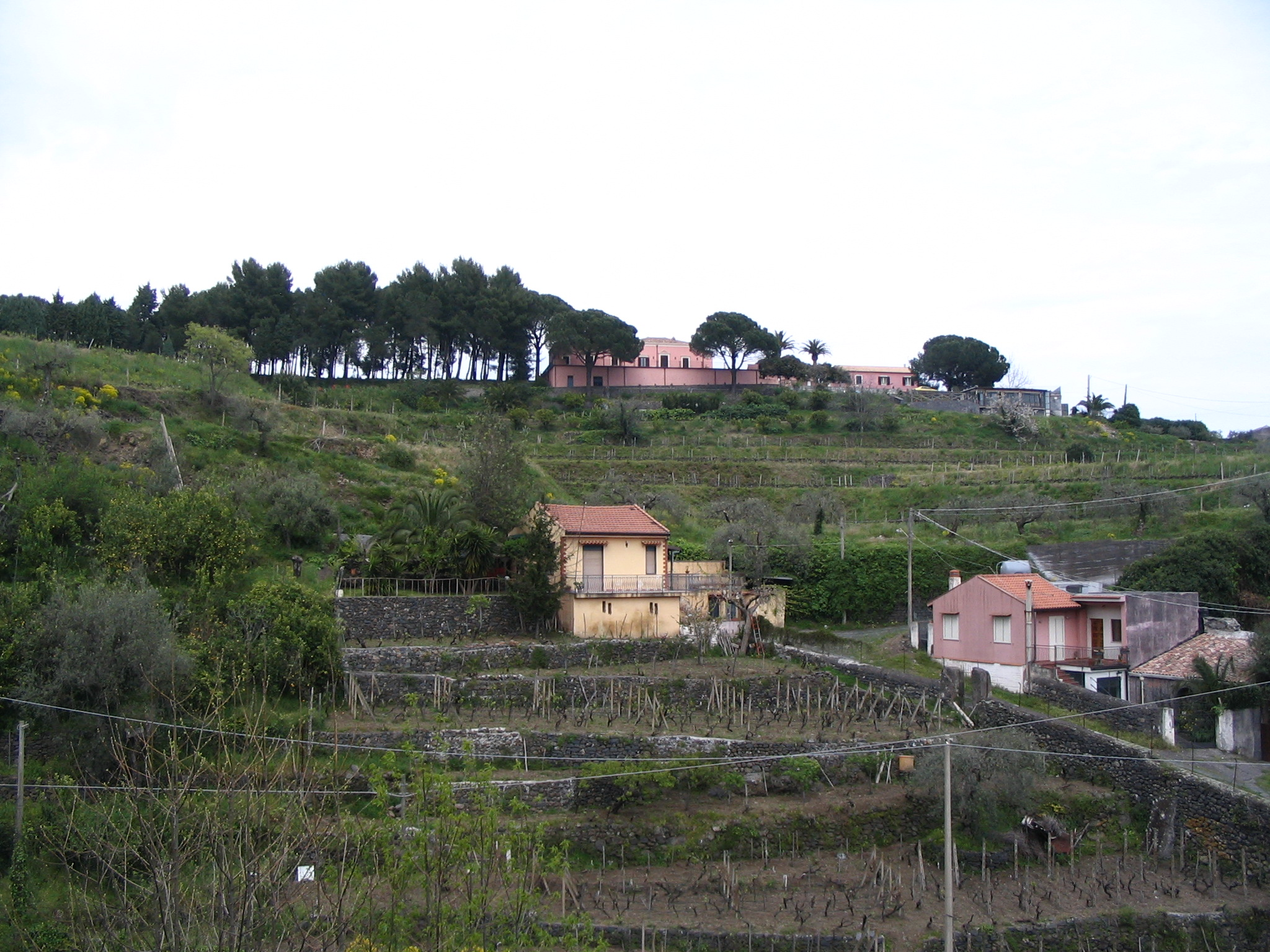
- Village San Michele in Santa Venerina

- Location within Italy Location within Sicily
- Coordinates: 37°41′N 15°8′E
- Country: Italy
- Region: Sicily
- Metropolitan city: Catania (CT)
- Frazioni: Cosentini, Dagala del Re, Linera, Maria Vergine, Monacella

Government
  - Mayor: Salvatore Greco

Area
  - Total: 18.8 km^{2} (7.3 sq mi)
- Elevation: 337 m (1,106 ft)

Population (31 December 2010)
  - Total: 8,405
  - Density: 447/km^{2} (1,160/sq mi)
- Demonym: Santavenerinesi
- Time zone: UTC+1 (CET)
  - Summer (DST): UTC+2 (CEST)
- Postal code: 95010
- Dialing code: 095
- Patron saint: Saint Venera
- Saint day: Sunday after 26 July
- Website: comune.santavenerina.ct.it

Santa Venerina (Sicilian: Santa Vinirina) is a comune (municipality) in the Metropolitan City of Catania in the Italian region Sicily, located about 160 kilometres (99 mi) southeast of Palermo and about 20 kilometres (12 mi) northeast of Catania.

Santa Venerina borders the following municipalities: Acireale, Giarre, Zafferana Etnea.
