= Pedara =

- Comune
- Comune di Pedara Sindaco = Guardone alberto
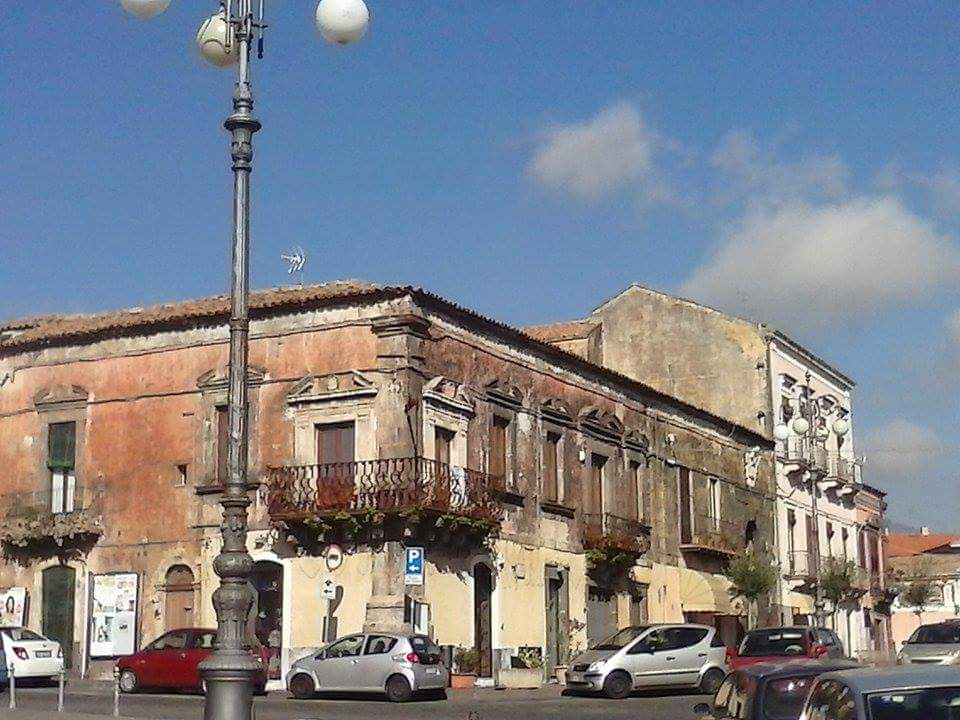

- Location within Italy Location within Sicily
- Coordinates: 37°37′N 15°4′E
- Country: Italy
- Region: Sicily
- Metropolitan city: Catania (CT)

Government
  - Mayor: Alfio Cristaudo

Area
  - Total: 19.23 km^{2} (7.42 sq mi)
- Elevation: 610 m (2,000 ft)

Population (31 March 2018)
  - Total: 14,589
  - Density: 758.7/km^{2} (1,965/sq mi)
- Demonym: Pedaresi
- Time zone: UTC+1 (CET)
  - Summer (DST): UTC+2 (CEST)
- Postal code: 95030
- Dialing code: 095
- Patron saint: Annunciation of Mary
- Saint day: 25 March
- Website: www.comune.pedara.ct.it

Pedara (Sicilian: Pirara) is a comune (municipality) in the Metropolitan City of Catania in the Italian region Sicily, located about 224 kilometres (139 mi) southeast of Palermo and about 11 kilometres (7 mi) north of Catania.

Pedara borders the municipalities of Mascalucia, Nicolosi, San Giovanni la Punta, Trecastagni, Tremestieri Etneo, and Zafferana Etnea.

== Economy ==
=== Tourism ===
During the summer season, it is a vacation resort due to the cooler climate than Catania because of the altitude. In the northernmost part is the ancient rural village of Tarderia, surrounded by a large extension of chestnut groves with mountain flora and alpine tree species. From Pedara, one can easily reach Etna, which is about 15 km (9.3 mi) away. Along the provincial road to Etna, the fossa del Salto del Cane, an ancient extinct crater with an equipped area (Base Point for Hiking in the Etna Park).

== Notable people ==
- Giuseppina Faro (1847–1871), Italian venerated laywoman
