= Santa Maria di Licodia =

- Comune
- Comune di Santa Maria di Licodia
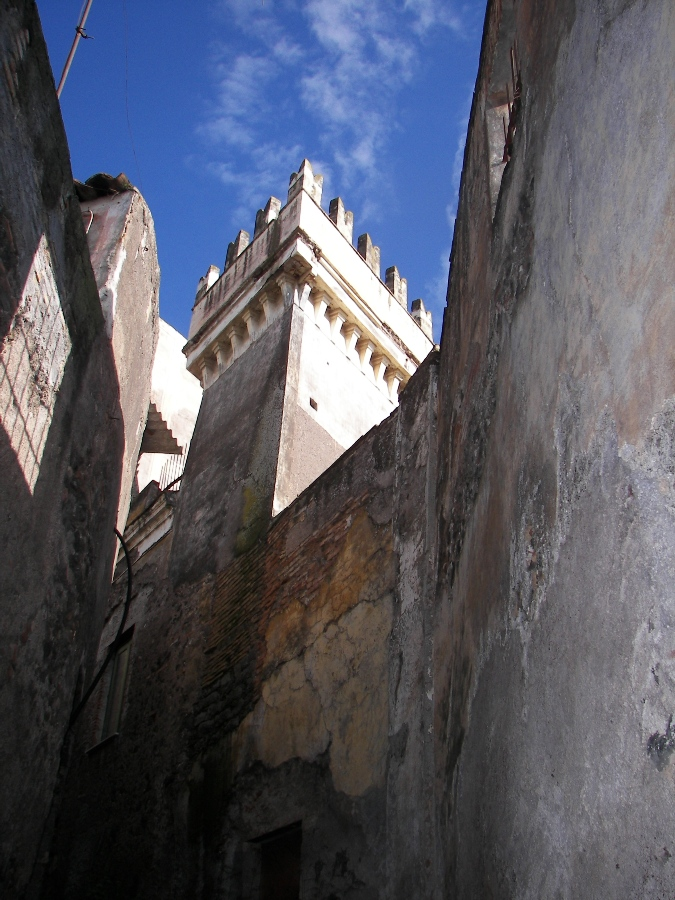
- Tower of Palazzo Bruno

- Location within Italy Location within Sicily
- Coordinates: 37°37′N 14°54′E
- Country: Italy
- Region: Sicily
- Metropolitan city: Catania (CT)
- Frazioni: Schettino

Government
  - Mayor: Salvatore Carmelo Mastroianni

Area
  - Total: 26.28 km^{2} (10.15 sq mi)
- Elevation: 442 m (1,450 ft)

Population (2018-01-01)
  - Total: 7,600
  - Density: 290/km^{2} (750/sq mi)
- Demonym: Licodiesi or Licodesi
- Time zone: UTC+1 (CET)
  - Summer (DST): UTC+2 (CEST)
- Postal code: 95038
- Dialing code: 095
- Patron saint: St. Joseph
- Saint day: Last Sunday in August
- Website: www.comune.santamariadilicodia.ct-egov.it

Santa Maria di Licodia (Sicilian: Santa Marìa di Licuddìa) is a town and comune in the Metropolitan City of Catania, eastern Sicily, southern Italy.

== History ==
Santa Maria di Licodia occupies traditionally the site of the ancient Aetna, a settlement founded by the colonists whom Hiero I of Syracuse had placed at Catania after their expulsion by the original inhabitants in 461 BC, which absorbed or incorporated an already existing Sicel town named Inessa.

== Main sights ==
- Chiesa Madre (Mother Church). Of the original medieval building, a bell tower has remained
- Cherubim Fountain (1757)
- Casina del Cavaliere, a Benedictine convent of medieval origin, outside the town.

A large hoard of coins was found also outside Santa Maria di Licodia in 1891.

In the nearby district of Civita is a large elliptical area, enclosed by a wall of masses of lava, which is about 8.5 metres (28 ft) wide at the base and 3 metres (10 ft) high. The ground is covered with fragments of tiles and pottery of the classical period, and it is probably a hastily built encampment of historic times rather than a primitive fortification, as there are no prehistoric traces.

== Twin towns ==
- Rabat, Malta
- Pisano Eteno, a frazione of Zafferana Etnea, Italy
- San Giuseppe di Ognina, Catania, Italy
