= Milo, Catania =

Milo
- Comune
- Comune di Milo
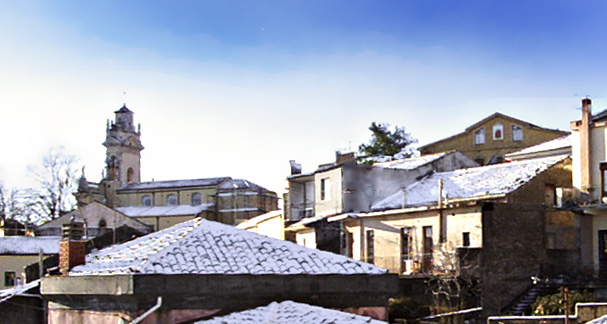

- Coat of arms

- Location within Italy Location within Sicily
- Coordinates: 37°43′N 15°7′E
- Country: Italy
- Region: Sicily
- Metropolitan city: Catania (CT)

Government
  - Mayor: Alfio Cosentino

Area
  - Total: 18.2 km^{2} (7.0 sq mi)
- Elevation: 720 m (2,360 ft)

Population (31 December 2010)
  - Total: 1,089
  - Density: 59.8/km^{2} (155/sq mi)
- Demonym: Milesi
- Time zone: UTC+1 (CET)
  - Summer (DST): UTC+2 (CEST)
- Postal code: 95010
- Dialing code: 095
- Patron saint: St. Andrew
- Website: www.comunedimilo.ct.it

Milo (Sicilian: Milu) is a comune (municipality) in the Metropolitan City of Catania in the Italian region Sicily, located about 160 kilometres (99 mi) southeast of Palermo and about 25 kilometres (16 mi) north of Catania.

Milo borders the following municipalities: Giarre, Sant'Alfio, Zafferana Etnea.
