= San Gregorio di Catania =

San Gregorio di Catania Comune di San Gregorio di Catania
- Comune
- Municipality of San Gregorio di Catania
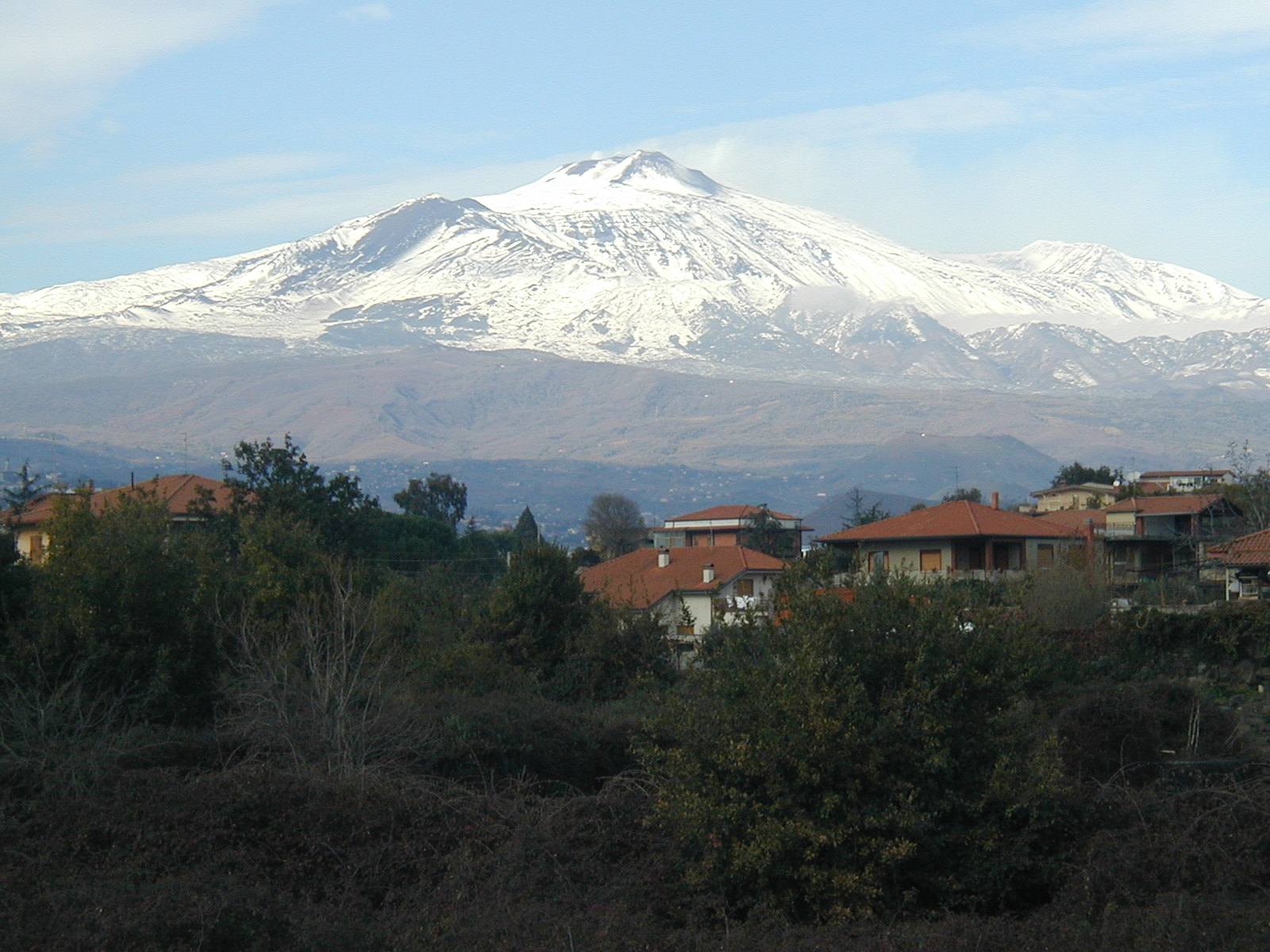
- Mount Etna seen from San Gregorio.

- Coat of arms

- Location within Italy Location within Sicily
- Country: Italy
- Region: Sicily
- Metropolitan city: Catania (CT)

Government
  - Mayor: Sebastiano Sgroi

Area
  - Total: 5.65 km^{2} (2.18 sq mi)
- Elevation: 321 m (1,053 ft)

Population (1 January 2015)
  - Total: 11,894
  - Density: 2,110/km^{2} (5,450/sq mi)
- Demonym: Sangregoresi
- Time zone: UTC+1 (CET)
  - Summer (DST): UTC+2 (CEST)
- Postal code: 95027
- Dialing code: 095
- Patron saint: Pope Gregory I
- Saint day: 3 September
- Website: www.comune.san-gregorio-di-catania.ct.it

San Gregorio di Catania (Sicilian: San Grigoriu) is a comune (municipality) in the Metropolitan City of Catania in the Italian region Sicily, located about 170 kilometres (110 mi) southeast of Palermo and about 7 kilometres (4 mi) northeast of Catania.

San Gregorio di Catania borders the following municipalities: Aci Castello, Catania, San Giovanni la Punta, Tremestieri Etneo, Valverde.

== History ==
The early 19th century saw the abolition of feudalism and barony. At that time the "Giurati" or "Jury" was replaced with the "Decurionato", a group ten men elected by common people and approved by the king. After Italian unification, in 1860, the "Decurionato" was also abolished and replaced by a modern administrative system. The only exception was during the fascist period when the mayor was replaced by a "Podestà". San Gregorio took its name from its patron saint, Pope Gregory I.

== See also ==
- A.S.D. Club Calcio San Gregorio
