= Province of Catania =

Province of Italy

Provincia di Catania Val di Catania
- Province of the Kingdom of the Two Sicilies, the Kingdom of Italy and the Italian Republic
- 1818–2015
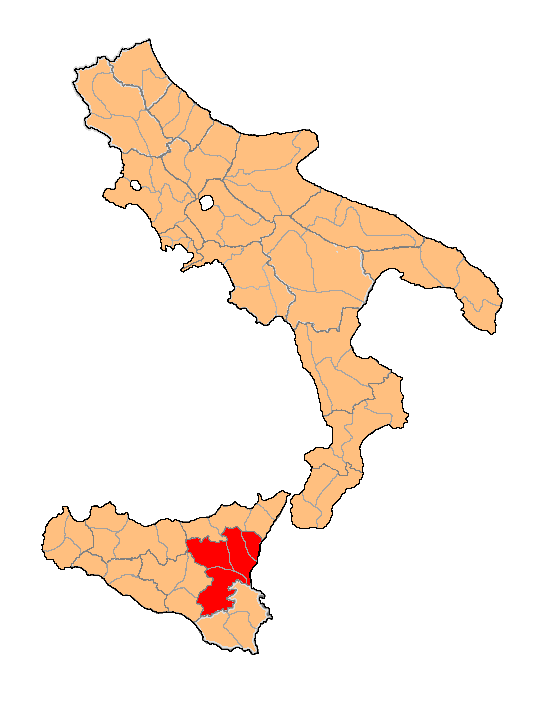
- Map highlighting area and location of the province of Catania in Southern Italy until 1927
- Map highlighting area and location of the province of Catania in Italy since 1927
- Capital: Catania
- Area
  - Coordinates: 37°31′N 15°4′E
  - 2014: 3,552 km^{2} (1,371 sq mi)
- Population
  - 2014: 1,116,917
- History
  - Established: 1 January 1818
  - Royal Decree of the Kingdom of the Two Sicilies: 11 October 1817
  - Giuseppe Garibaldi's Decree for the Kingdom of Italy: 11 June 1860
  - Disestablished: 4 August 2015
- Today part of: Metropolitan City of Catania

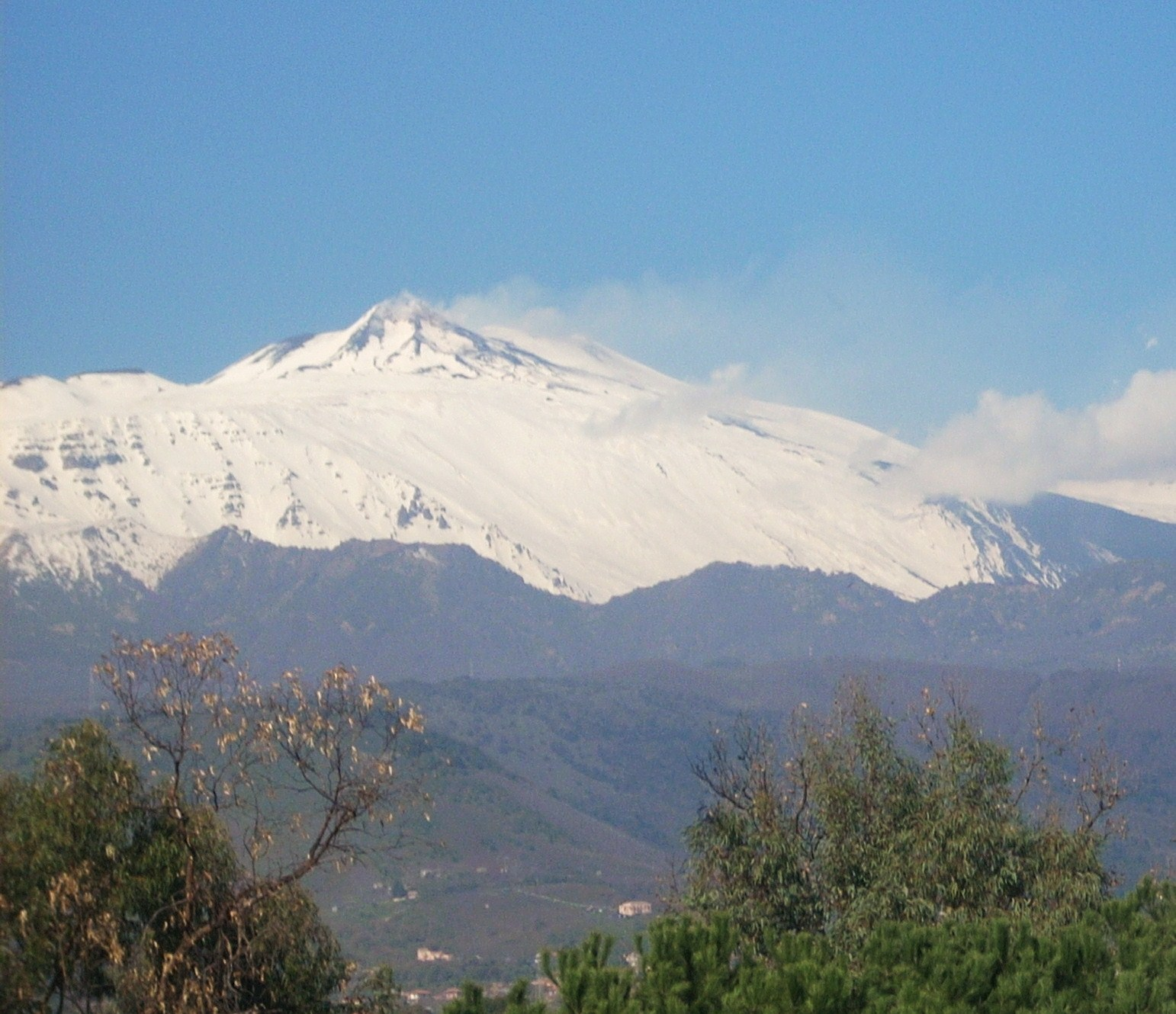
Mount Etna was located in the province of Catania.

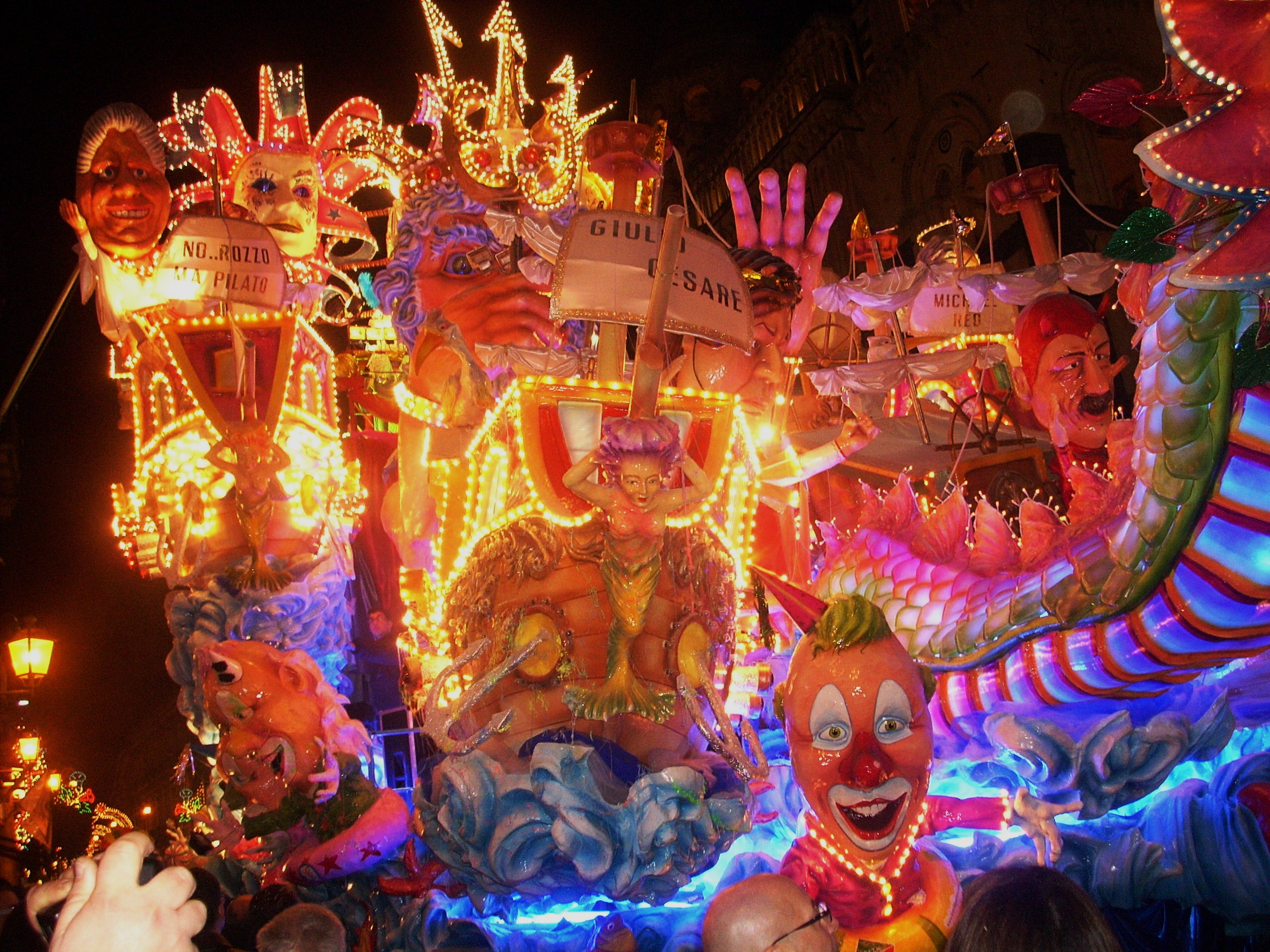
The Carnival of Acireale is the most famous of the Sicily.

The province of Catania (Italian: provincia di Catania; Sicilian: pruvincia di Catania) was a province in the autonomous island region of Sicily, Italy. Its capital was the city of Catania. It had an area of 3,552 square kilometres (1,371 mi^{2}) and a total population of about 1,116,917 as of 31 December 2014.

Historically known also as Val di Catania, (Note: From Siculo-Arabic وَلاية walāya, with the administrative meaning of 'province'; also used with the geographical meaning of 'valley', relating it to Latin vallis. Compare the three historical valli of Sicily.) it included until 1927 a large part of the province of Enna.

It was replaced by the Metropolitan City of Catania starting from August 4, 2013.

== History ==
The area of Catania was founded by Greeks in 729 BC. It was conquered by the Romans in the First Punic War, in 263 BC. It had experienced many volcanic eruptions from the Mount Etna, of which the first eruption was recorded in 475 BC. It was hit by a devastating earthquake in 1169, which caused an estimated death toll of about 15,000 people in the city of Catania alone. In 1669, it was also affected by the 1669 Etna eruption. It was hit by another earthquake in 1693, which resulted in the death of about 12,000 people (63% population at the time).

== Geography ==
The province of Catania was one of nine provinces in the island of Sicily, the largest island in the Mediterranean Sea. It met the Ionian Sea at the northeast. The province of Caltanissetta and the province of Enna lay to the west, the province of Ragusa and the province of Siracusa lay to the south, and the province of Messina lay to the north. It also had the largest active volcano of Europe, Mount Etna. The provincial capital and largest commune was the city of Catania.

=== Subdivisions ===
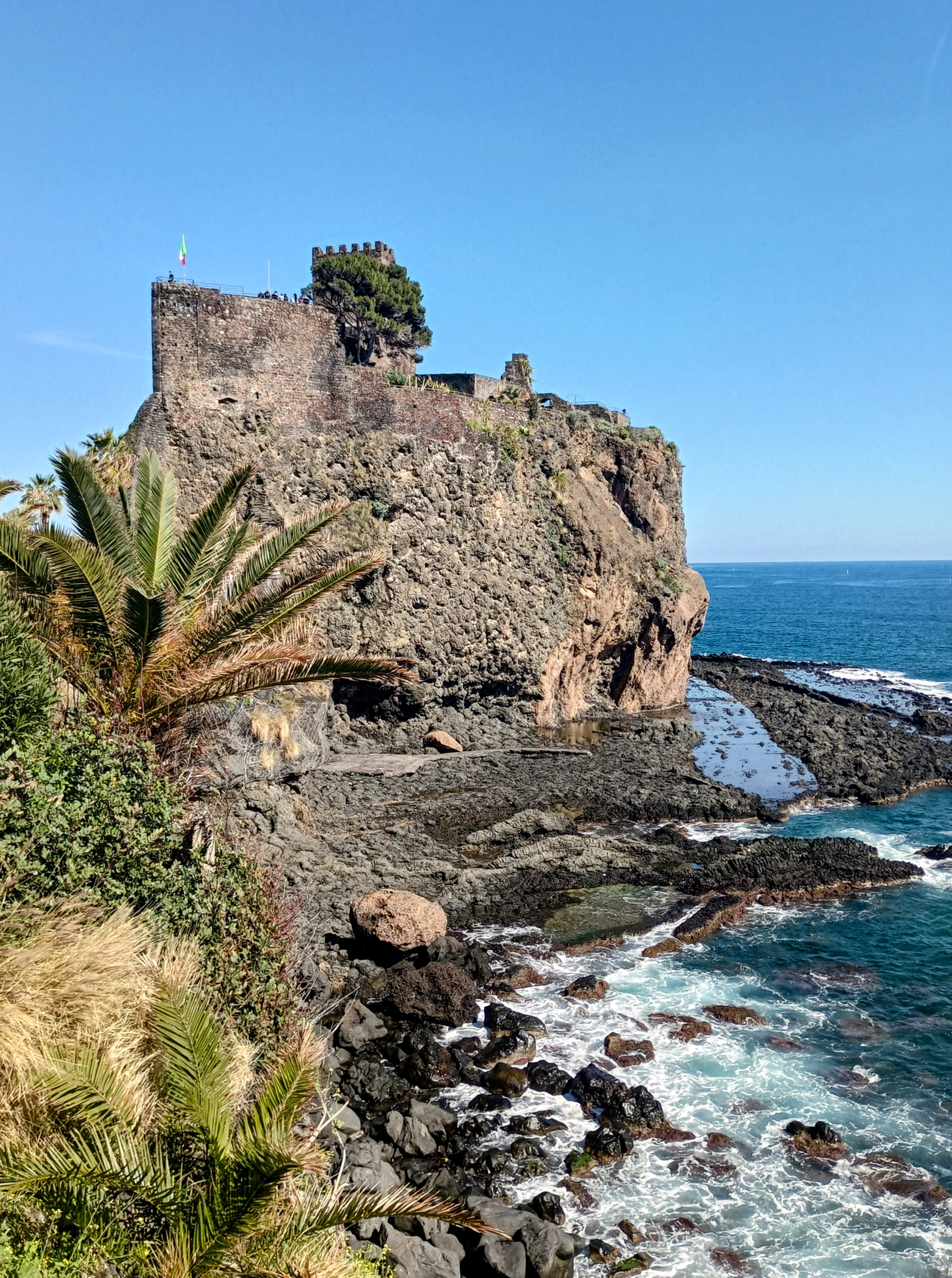
Aci Castello, a comune in the province, north of Catania

There were 58 comuni (sing.: comune) in the province.

== See also ==
- Metropolitan City of Catania
