= Biancavilla =

- Comune
- Comune di Biancavilla
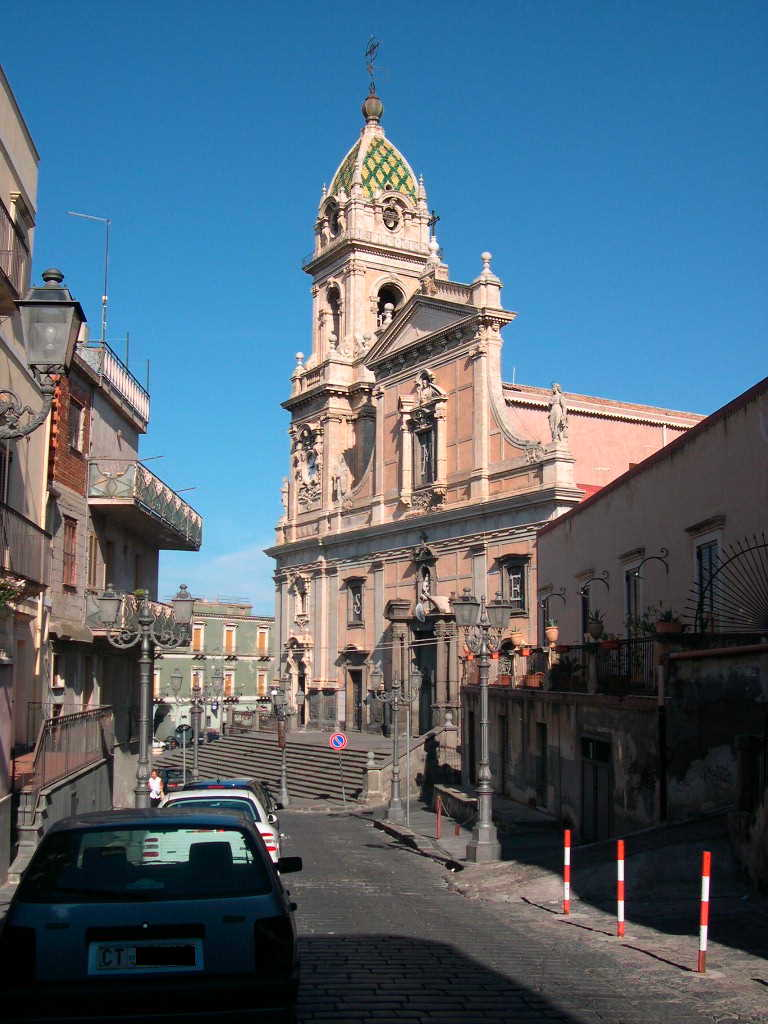
- Santa Maria Elemosina Cathedral

- Coat of arms

- Location within Italy Location within Sicily
- Coordinates: 37°39′N 14°52′E
- Country: Italy
- Region: Sicily
- Metropolitan city: Catania (CT)

Government
  - Mayor: Antonio Bonanno

Area
  - Total: 70.28 km^{2} (27.14 sq mi)
- Elevation: 513 m (1,683 ft)

Population (11 December 2025)
  - Total: 22,880
  - Density: 325.6/km^{2} (843.2/sq mi)
- Demonym: Biancavillesi Biancavilloti
- Time zone: UTC+1 (CET)
  - Summer (DST): UTC+2 (CEST)
- Postal code: 95033
- Dialing code: 095
- Patron saint: St. Placidus and Maria SS. dell'Elemosina
- Saint day: 6 October
- Website: Official website

Biancavilla (Arbëreshë Albanian: Callìcari) is a town and comune in the Metropolitan City of Catania, Sicily, southern Italy. It is located between the towns of Adrano and S. Maria di Licodia, 32 kilometres (20 mi) northwest of Catania. The town was founded and historically inhabited by the Arbëreshë community.

== History ==
The territory of Biancavilla has been inhabited since the Upper Paleolithic era, primarily due to the abundance of natural springs and lava caves in the area. Evidence suggests the presence of the Sicani people first, followed by the Siculi. Archaeological finds, including a significant necropolis with oval pit tombs surrounded by dry-stone walls, are preserved in the civic museum of Adrano. The modern town of Biancavilla was officially founded on 8 January 1488. Following the death of Gjergj Kastrioti Skanderbeg and the subsequent Turkish invasion, many Albanian families fled their homeland. A group of these refugees, led by Captain Cesare Masi, arrived in an area known as Callicari or Pojo Rosso in the territory of Adrano. The Albanian founders of Biancavilla, carried a Byzantine painting of the Virgin Mary with the Child La Madonna dell'Elemosina during their journey. When they stopped to rest at the site of the future town, they hung the sacred painting on a large tree. The next morning, when they tried to retrieve the image to move on, they found the painting had become miraculously stuck and immovable in the tree's trunk. Interpreting this as a divine sign, the refugees understood that the Virgin Mary had chosen this specific spot for them to build their new settlement and their church. They settled there and built the Basilica of Santa Maria dell'Elemosina around the location of the miracle. They received the "Licentia Populandi" a privilege to settle from Gian Tommaso Moncada, Count of Adernò the future Adrano. This permission allowed the Albanian community to establish their settlement. Biancavilla was relatively spared from significant damage during the catastrophic 1669 Etna eruption and the devastating 1693 earthquake, which destroyed much of the Val di Noto. This resilience led many residents from nearby, destroyed towns to seek refuge in Biancavilla.

== Origin of the Name ==
The village was initially referred to in documents by various names, including Callicari and "Casale dei Greci", as the community initially maintained the Greek rite for almost a century. While some sources suggest the name "Biancavilla" was an homage to Queen Bianca of Navarre, the most accepted theory is that the name derives from the white color of the houses (bianco meaning white, villa meaning town/village), which created a stark contrast with the black lava stone of the surrounding Etnean landscape. The town was also known as Albavilla before the name Biancavilla was definitively adopted around 1599.

== Religious Life ==
The construction of the main church, the Basilica di Santa Maria dell'Elemosina, began shortly after the town's founding in the late 15th and early 16th century. The basilica holds relics, including the silver reliquary of San Zenone, traditionally brought by the Albanian founders.

== Modern Times ==
Today, Biancavilla is an important center for the production and trade of agricultural goods, including almonds, grapes, citrus fruits, apples, vegetables, and prickly pears. The local economy also includes artisan businesses in the food, clothing, furniture, and construction material sectors. The town's coat of arms, featuring an eagle bearing the shield on its chest, symbolizes the heroism of Skanderbeg, the Albanian national hero who fought against the Turks.
