= Aci Sant'Antonio =

Aci Sant'Antonio Jaci Sant'Antoniu (Sicilian)
- Comune
- Comune di Aci Sant'Antonio
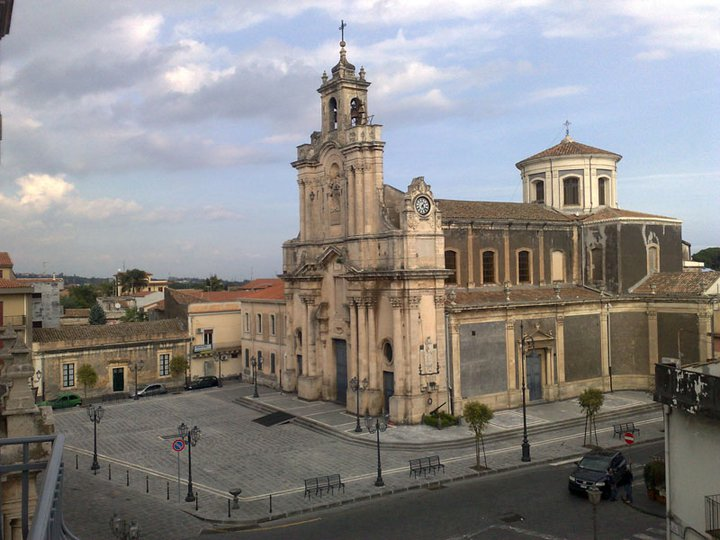
- Chiesa Madre and Piazza Maggiore, Aci Sant'Antonio

- Location of Aci Sant'Antonio in Italy Aci Sant'Antonio (Sicily)
- Coordinates: 37°36′N 15°7′E
- Country: Italy
- Region: Sicily
- Metropolitan city: Catania (CT)
- Frazioni: S. Maria La Stella, Monterosso Etneo, Lavinaio, Lavina

Government
  - Mayor: Quintino Rocca

Area
  - Total: 14.3 km^{2} (5.5 sq mi)
- Elevation: 302 m (991 ft)

Population (31 July 2016)
  - Total: 18,054
  - Density: 1,260/km^{2} (3,270/sq mi)
- Demonym: Santantonesi
- Time zone: UTC+1 (CET)
  - Summer (DST): UTC+2 (CEST)
- Postal code: 95025
- Dialing code: 095
- Patron saint: St. Anthony Abbot
- Saint day: 17 January
- Website: www.comune.acisantantonio.ct.it

Aci Sant'Antonio (Sicilian: Jaci Sant'Antoniu) is a comune (municipality) in the Metropolitan City of Catania in the Italian region of Sicily, located about 160 kilometres (99 mi) southeast of Palermo and about 10 kilometres (6 mi) northeast of Catania.

The frazione of Santa Maria La Stella is home to an annual Presepe vivente degli antichi mestieri, an animated crib presented every Christmas by the parish and visited by many people from all over Sicily.

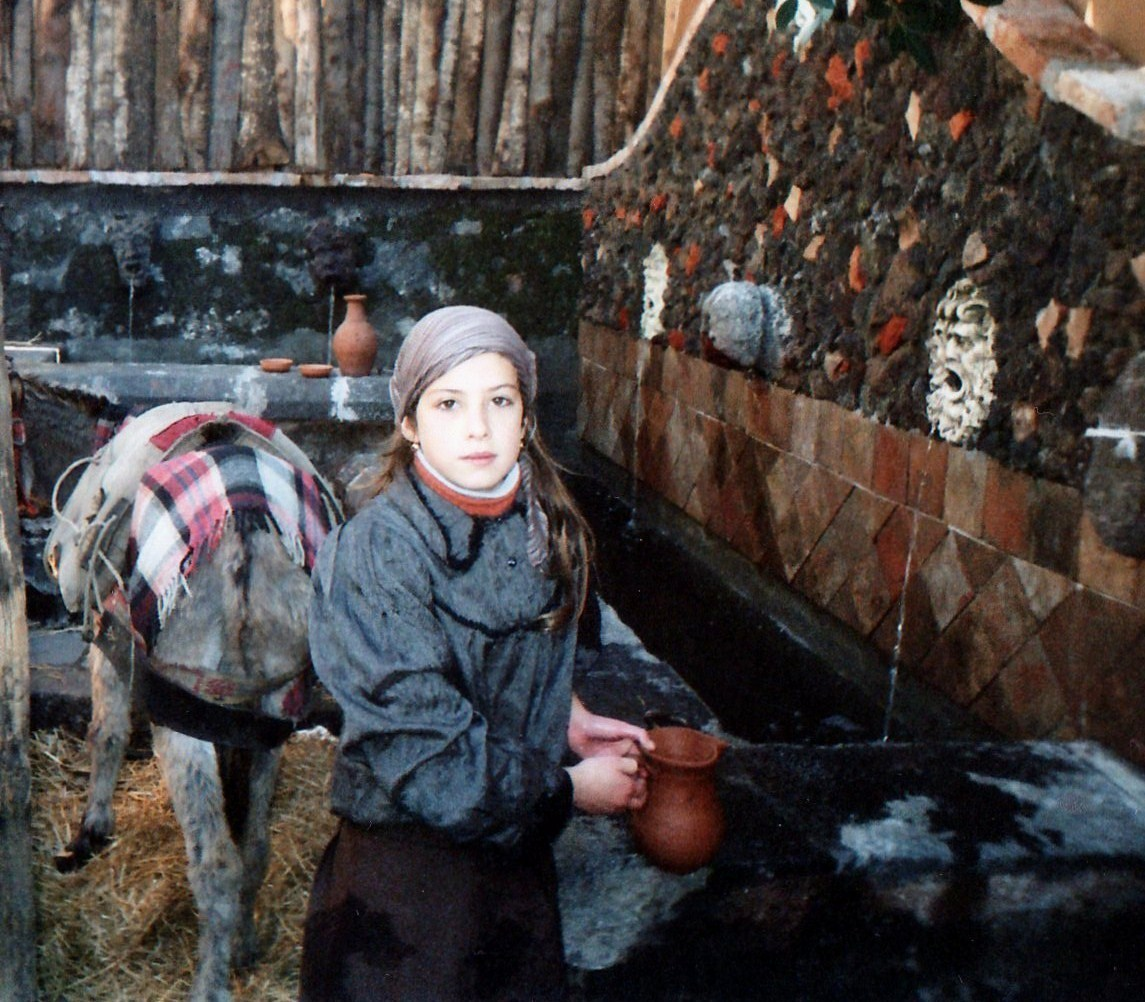
A personage from the Presepe vivente degli antichi mestieri of Santa Maria La Stella, 2005
