= Castiglione di Sicilia =

- Comune
- Comune di Castiglione di Sicilia
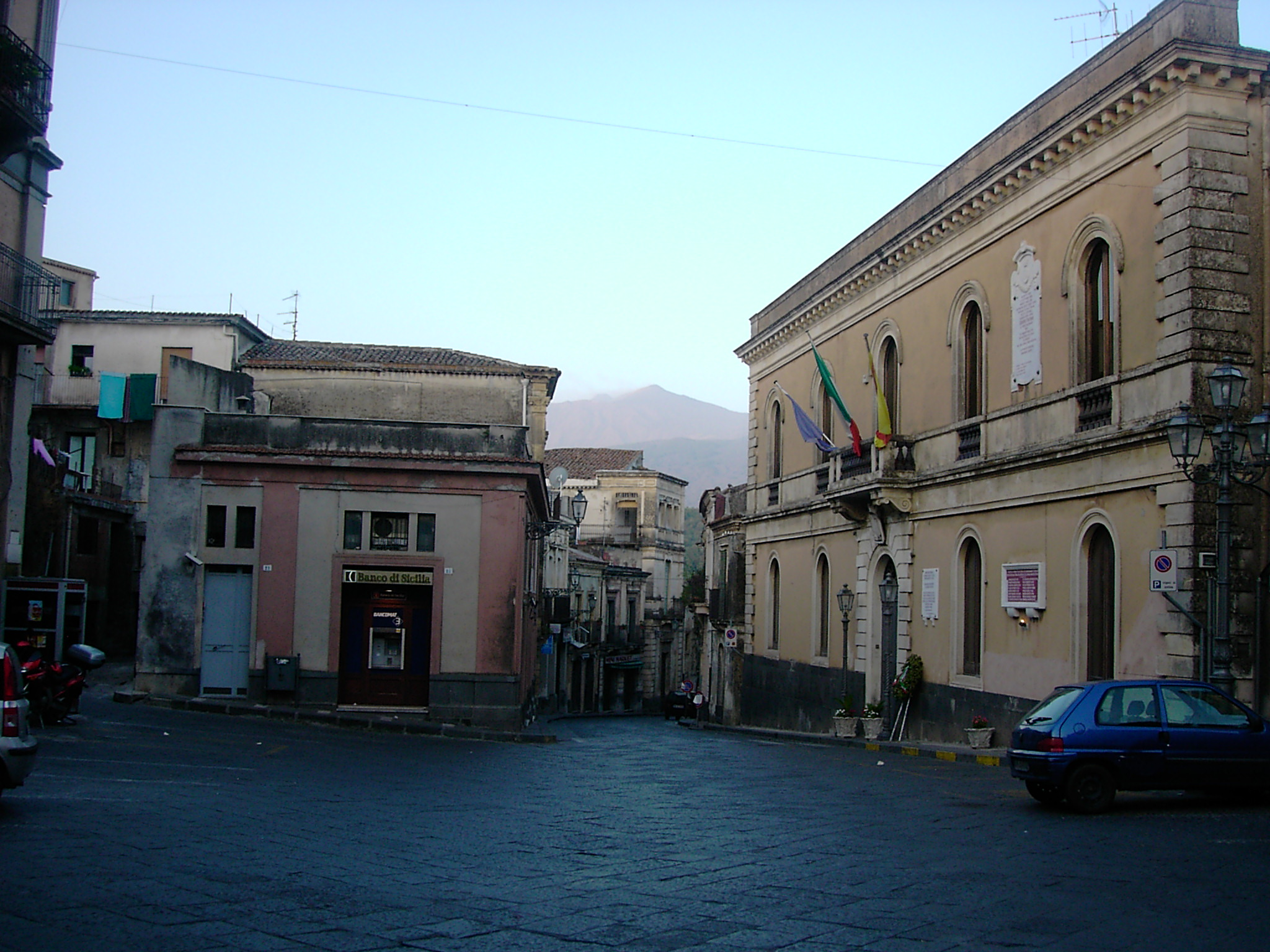
- Piazza Lauria

- Location within Italy Location within Sicily
- Coordinates: 37°53′N 15°7′E
- Country: Italy
- Region: Sicily
- Metropolitan city: Catania (CT)
- Frazioni: Gravà, Mitogio, Passopisciaro, Rovittello, Solicchiata, Verzella, Castrorai

Government
  - Mayor: Antonio Camarda

Area
  - Total: 120.5 km^{2} (46.5 sq mi)
- Elevation: 621 m (2,037 ft)

Population (31 December 2021)
  - Total: 2,930
  - Density: 24.3/km^{2} (63.0/sq mi)
- Demonym: Castiglionesi
- Time zone: UTC+1 (CET)
  - Summer (DST): UTC+2 (CEST)
- Postal code: 95012
- Dialing code: 0942
- Patron saint: Madonna of the Chain.
- Saint day: First Sunday in May
- Website: www.comune.castiglionedisicilia.ct.it

Castiglione di Sicilia (Sicilian: Castigghiuni di Sicilia) is a comune (municipality) in the Metropolitan City of Catania in Sicily, southern Italy. It is one of I Borghi più belli d'Italia ("The most beautiful villages of Italy").

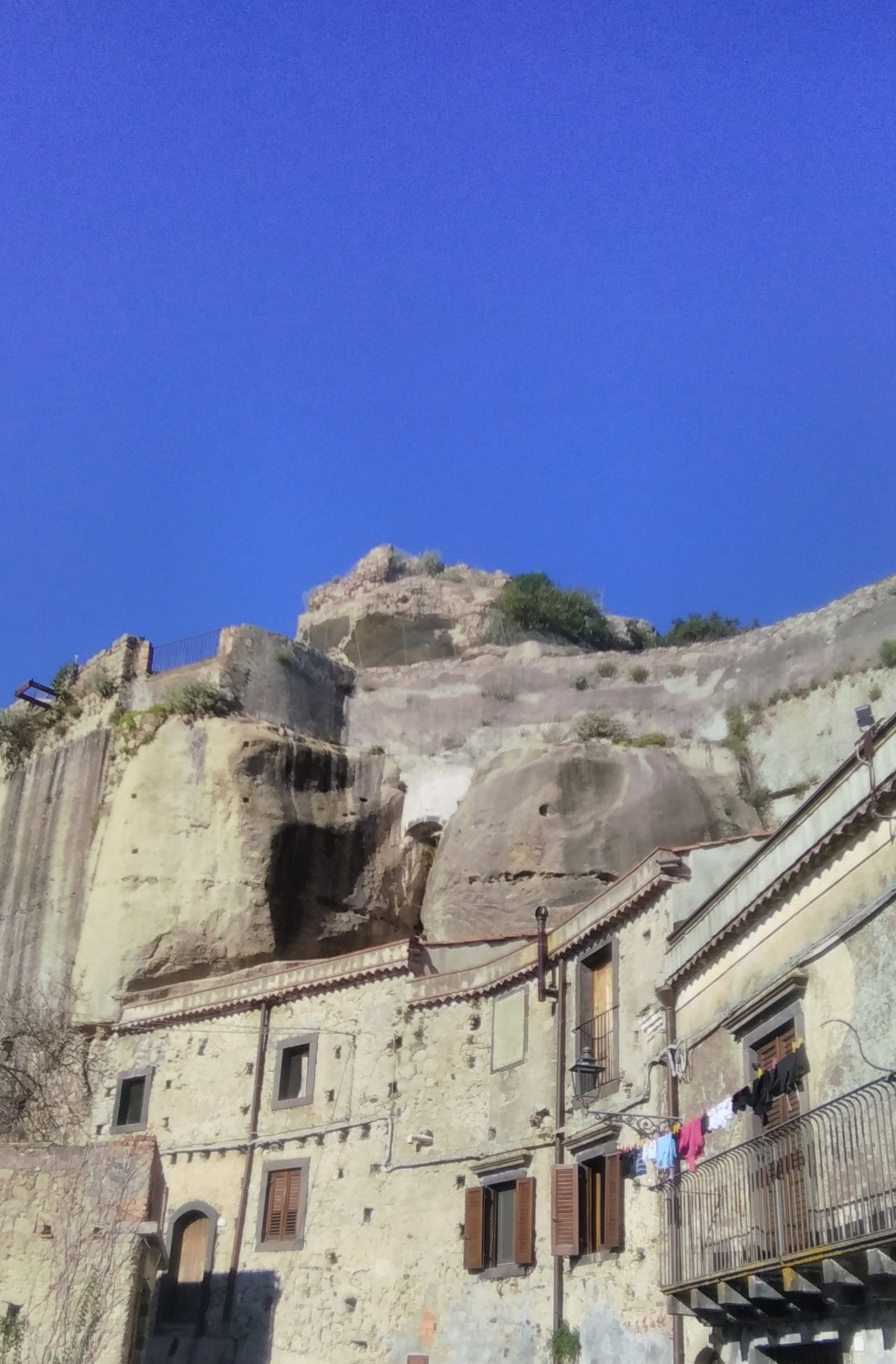
Medieval city centre with Lauria Castle at the summit

Castiglione di Sicilia lies about 160 kilometres (99 mi) east of Palermo and about 40 kilometres (25 mi) north of Catania. It borders the following municipalities: Adrano, Belpasso, Biancavilla, Bronte, Calatabiano, Francavilla di Sicilia, Gaggi, Graniti, Linguaglossa, Maletto, Malvagna, Mojo Alcantara, Motta Camastra, Nicolosi, Piedimonte Etneo, Randazzo, Roccella Valdemone, Sant'Alfio, Taormina, Zafferana Etnea.

== Passopisciaro ==
Passopisciaro is a frazione of Castiglione di Sicilia situated 12 kilometres (7 mi) from Castiglione di Sicilia, at 645 metres (2,116 ft) above sea level on the northern slopes of Mount Etna. Nowadays Passopisciaro has a population of about 500 but in years gone by the population was as high as 1,500 people. The village can be reached by taking the SS120 Roman road from Fiumefreddo di Sicilia, or by the Circumetnea Railway. Passopisciaro's main industry is wine making, vineyards can be found scattered throughout the entire region.

== Twin towns ==
Castiglione di Sicilia is twinned with:

- (Republic of Ireland) Killarney, Ireland
- Tauves, France
