= Calatabiano =

- Comune
- Comune di Calatabiano
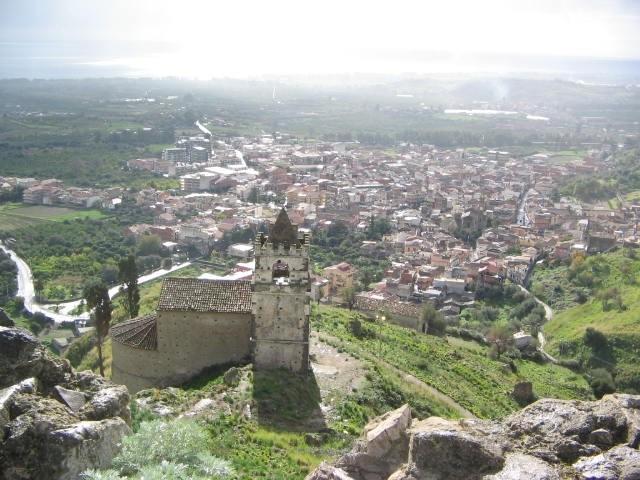

- Location within Italy Location within Sicily
- Coordinates: 37°49′N 15°14′E
- Country: Italy
- Region: Sicily
- Metropolitan city: Catania (CT)
- Frazioni: Lapide Pasteria, Ponte Borea, Ciotto, San Marco

Government
  - Mayor: Giuseppe Intelisano

Area
  - Total: 26.42 km^{2} (10.20 sq mi)
- Elevation: 60 m (200 ft)

Population (30 April 2017)
  - Total: 5,264
  - Density: 199.2/km^{2} (516.0/sq mi)
- Demonym: Calatabianesi
- Time zone: UTC+1 (CET)
  - Summer (DST): UTC+2 (CEST)
- Postal code: 95011
- Dialing code: 095
- Patron saint: St. Philip of Agira
- Saint day: 12 May
- Website: www.comune.calatabiano.ct.it

Calatabiano (Sicilian: Cattabbianu) is a comune (municipality) in the Metropolitan City of Catania in Sicily, southern Italy.

== Geography ==
Calatabiano is located about 60 metres above the sea level. It is located about 42 kilometres northeast of Catania. about 58 kilometres southwest of Messina and about 175 kilometres east of Palermo. The population is about 75% in the center of the town, and about 25% is located in Pasteria Lapide. Calatabiano borders the following municipalities: Castiglione di Sicilia, Fiumefreddo di Sicilia, Giardini-Naxos, Linguaglossa, Piedimonte Etneo, Taormina. The municipality of Calatabiano is a part of Parco fluviale dell'Alcantara (Alcantara River Park).

== History ==
The history of Calatabiano is closely linked to its castle, located 160 meters above the sea level. Calatabiano Castle was founded by the Arabs, who moved from Calatabiano to conquer Taormina in 902. The Arab presence in Calatabiano is clearly visible from the name of the town, which is divided in قلعة ("Kalaat", meaning "castle") and 'to Bian, likely name of the local lord.

After the death of Frederick II, the castle was given to Giovanni Moro by Conrad IV. In 1254, the Pope gave to Giovanni Moro some possessions, including Calatabiano Castle, in exchange for guarantee military aid in the defense of the Kingdom of Sicily.

The Cruyllas enlarged the castle and built the church of Santissimo Crocifisso (the Holy Cross).

In 1544 the pirate Dragut landed on the shore of San Marco beach, stormed and ransacked the village. In 1693 due to the earthquake felt in Sicily and Malta accompanied by the eruption of Mount Etna, the village and castle were abandoned. In 1813 the Sicilian parliament marked the end of feudalism in the island. In the same year Calatabiano was declared an autonomous municipality, the boundaries has been maintained until this day.

== Main sights ==
=== Civil architecture ===
Thanks to the excavations done between the end of the 20th century and the beginning of the next century, there has been found traces of a castle in the Byzantine era. Because of its military importance, the Hohenstaufen first and then the Aragonese improved the Castle's defence. The Cruyllas enlarged the fortress up to its current appearance.

Main features include the "Salone dei Cruyllas" ("Hall of Cruyllas") and the entry portal. In the last few decades the castle has been renovated and became a tourist attraction. The castle could be reached by a winding road or by a cable car that was built during the restoration of the castle in 2011.

Despite its name, San Marco's Castle is actually a noble residence on the San Marco's shore. The construction was being built in 1689 by the lord of the time, Ignazio Sebastiano Gravina Prince of Palagonia, and completed in two years. The actual castle looks different from the original building, this is due to the numerous changes made over the decades. In 1856 it was leased to Baron Pasquale Pennisi of Floristella. The Baron changed the Castle with the construction of a winery and some houses for farmers.

=== Religious architectures ===
==== Chiesa del Santissimo Crocifisso ====
The church of Santissimo Crocifisso (the Holy Cross) is the first church of Calatabiano and it was inaugurated on 4 March 1484. Its Gothic architecture include a massive crenellated bell tower and two ogival entrances, west and south. Inside the church there is a statue of St. Philip of Agira (patron saint of Calatabiano). In the bell tower, on the west wall, is a 16th-century fresco of the Madonna and Child.

==== Chiesa di Madre di Maria Santissima Annunziata ====
The church of Madre di Maria Santissima Annunziata was built in 1740 with a single nave. It is located in the central of Vittorio Emanuele III square. Internally it houses a wooden crucifix from 1502 of Giovanni Salvo D'Antonio.

==== Chiesa di Gesù e Maria ====
The Church of Gesù e Maria (Jesus and Mary) dates from 1697; it has a facade in masonry and white stone.

== Culture ==
=== Events ===
==== La calata di San Filippo ====
The traditional descent of St. Philip takes place during the feast of St. Philip Syriac, protector of the town, on the Saturday before the third Sunday of May. The tradition started back in 1766. During the descent, the statue of the saint has to be carried by the devotees from the Church of the Holy Cross to the center of the town. The procession begins at 06:30 pm, the devotees run through the bumpy roads of Calatabiano. The feast ends on the fourth Sunday of May.

==== Other events ====
- The historical Medieval parade takes place on the feast of St. Philip Syriac. The parade commemorates the customs of Cruyllas' lords, soldiers and peasants of the fifteenth century village.
- The Cannici bonfire happens on 13 December during the feast of Saint Lucy.
- The Loquat festival is held every year on the second Sunday of May.
- Muzikfest, independent music festival, takes place in the summer on the San Marco beach.
- The medieval evenings of Calatabiano (in August).
