= Piedimonte Etneo =

- Comune
- Comune di Piedimonte Etneo
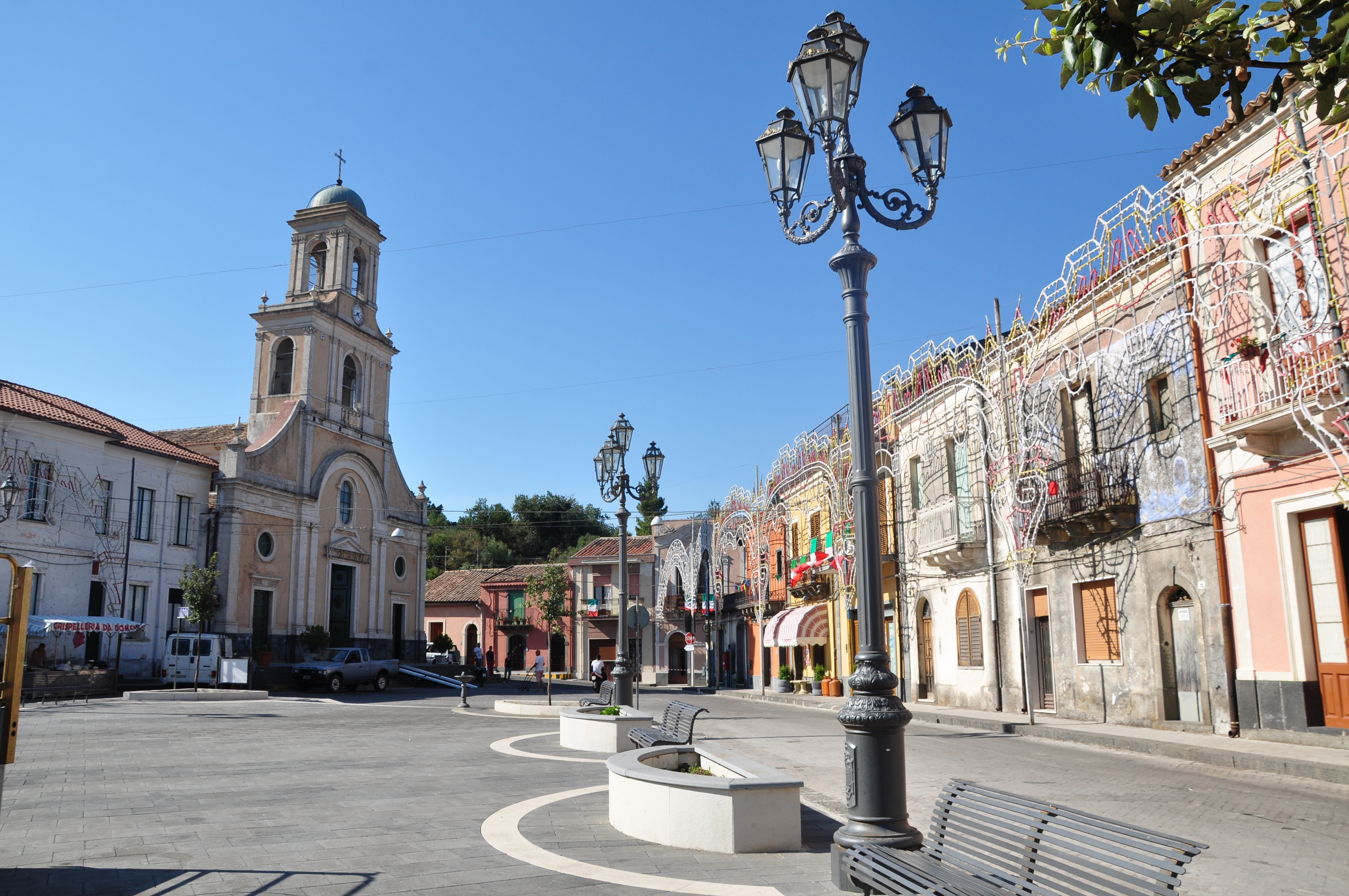
- Piazza SS. Maria delle Grazie in the frazione of Presa.

- Location within Italy Location within Sicily
- Coordinates: 37°48′N 15°10′E
- Country: Italy
- Region: Sicily
- Metropolitan city: Catania (CT)

Government
  - Mayor: Ignazio Puglisi

Area
  - Total: 26.54 km^{2} (10.25 sq mi)
- Elevation: 348 m (1,142 ft)

Population (31 March 2018)
  - Total: 3,972
  - Density: 149.7/km^{2} (387.6/sq mi)
- Demonym: Piedimontesi
- Time zone: UTC+1 (CET)
  - Summer (DST): UTC+2 (CEST)
- Postal code: 95017
- Dialing code: 095
- Website: www.comune.piedimonte-etneo.ct.it

Piedimonte Etneo (Sicilian: Piemunti) is a comune (municipality) in the Metropolitan City of Catania in the Italian region Sicily, located about 160 kilometres (99 mi) east of Palermo and about 35 kilometres (22 mi) northeast of Catania.

Piedimonte Etneo borders the following municipalities: Calatabiano, Castiglione di Sicilia, Fiumefreddo di Sicilia, Linguaglossa, Mascali, Sant'Alfio.
