= Fiumefreddo di Sicilia =

- Comune
- Comune di Fiumefreddo di Sicilia
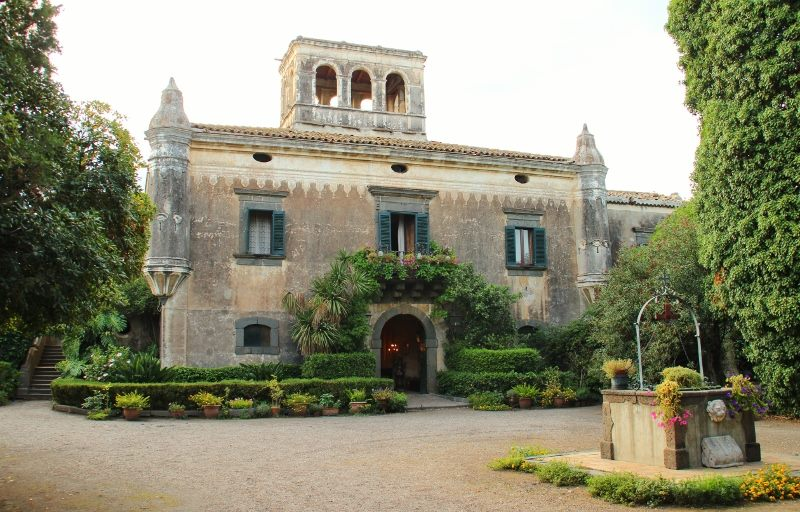
- Castello degli schiavi.

- Coat of arms

- Location within Italy Location within Sicily
- Coordinates: 37°48′N 15°12′E
- Country: Italy
- Region: Sicily
- Metropolitan city: Catania (CT)
- Frazioni: Borgo Valerio, Botteghelle, Castello, Civì, Diana, Feudogrande, Gona-Vignagrande, Ponte Borea, Liberto, Torrerossa

Government
  - Mayor: Angelo Torrisi

Area
  - Total: 12 km^{2} (4.6 sq mi)
- Elevation: 62 m (203 ft)

Population (31 December 2021)
  - Total: 9,128
  - Density: 760/km^{2} (2,000/sq mi)
- Demonym: fiumefreddesi
- Time zone: UTC+1 (CET)
  - Summer (DST): UTC+2 (CEST)
- Postal code: 95013
- Dialing code: 095
- Patron saint: Saint Joseph (19 May); Immaculate Conception of Mary (last Sunday of July)
- Website: Official website

Fiumefreddo di Sicilia (Italian pronunciation: [ˌfjumeˈfreddo di siˈtʃiːlja]; Sicilian: Ciumifriddu, or I Putijeḍḍi) is a comune in the Metropolitan City of Catania on the coast of the Ionian Sea on the island of Sicily, southern Italy. It shares its borders with the municipalities of Calatabiano to the north, Mascali to the south and Piedimonte Etneo to the west.

The commune gets its name from the Fiumefreddo River which runs alongside the territory of the comune. "Fiume freddo" literally means "cold river", a reference to the fact that the river is fed by snow melts from Mount Etna. Fiumefreddo di Sicilia is near the major Etna tourist centres. The SS120 to Mount Etna and Randazzo start from there.

Fiumefreddo di Sicilia was so named to distinguish it from Fiumefreddo Bruzio, in the Province of Cosenza. Currently the town has almost 10,000 inhabitants.

== Geography ==
Fiumefreddo stands along the SS 114 and A18, both roads running from Catania to Messina. Fiumefreddo di Sicilia is in the heart of a road and railway network, near Taormina and Acireale, not far from Catania and Messina.

Fiumefreddo is bounded by the Ionian Sea to the East, by Calatabiano to the North, by Piedimonte Etneo to the West and by Mascali to the South. Its municipal territory is mainly flat, especially along the coast, where there is the Marina di Cottone beach, which is subject to very intense summer tourism.

Fiumefreddo is so named after the river that runs through it, whose natural habitat, with its cold water, has allowed the development of typical river flora and fauna. In order to protect this particular natural environment, the Sicilian regional government, through a law D.A. n. 205185, has instituted a protected area, The Nature Reserve of The River Fiumefreddo.

Free mandarines, oranges and cactus fruits close to the station from the trees to take.

== History ==
Fiumefreddo originated in the 18th century around a 16th-century watchtower. It became an independent commune in 1801.

== Main sights ==
- Church of Santissima Maria Immacolata
- Church of Maria Santissima del Rosario (18th century)
- Castello degli Schiavi ("Slaves' Castle"), an example of rural Sicilian Baroque architecture. The building was used for several shots in the American movie The Godfather (parts I and II).
- Red Tower, a funerary building of Roman origins

Filippo Torrisi Statue.

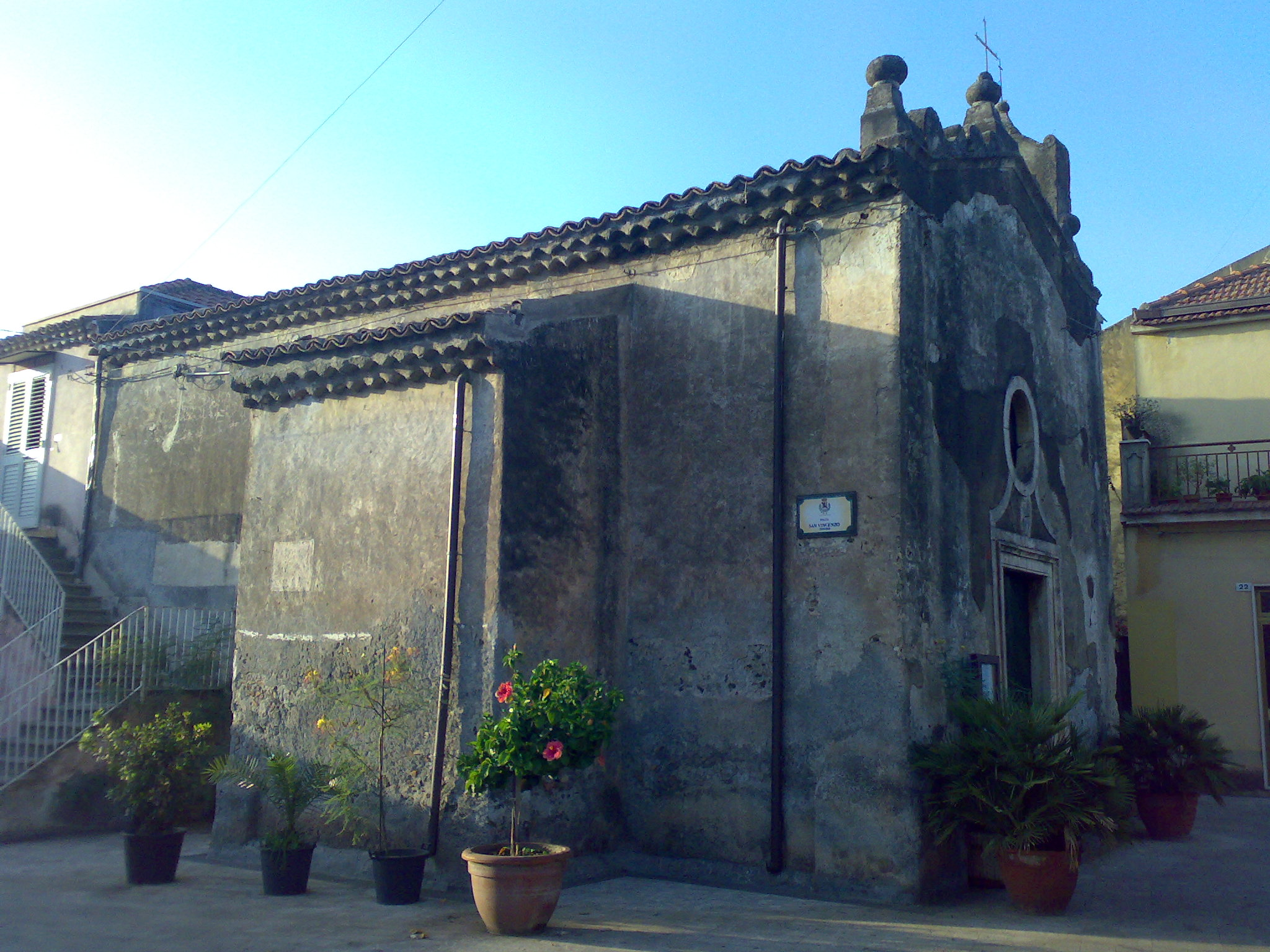
St. Vincenzo Ferreri Church.

== Twin towns ==
- Oelsnitz, Germany, since 2002
- Aš, Czech Republic, since 2002

== Sources ==
- Bonanno, Giuseppe (2000). Guida di Fiumefreddo di Sicilia. Acireale: Bonanno Editore. ISBN 88-7796-102-3.
