= Francesco Messina =

Italian sculptor (1900–1995)

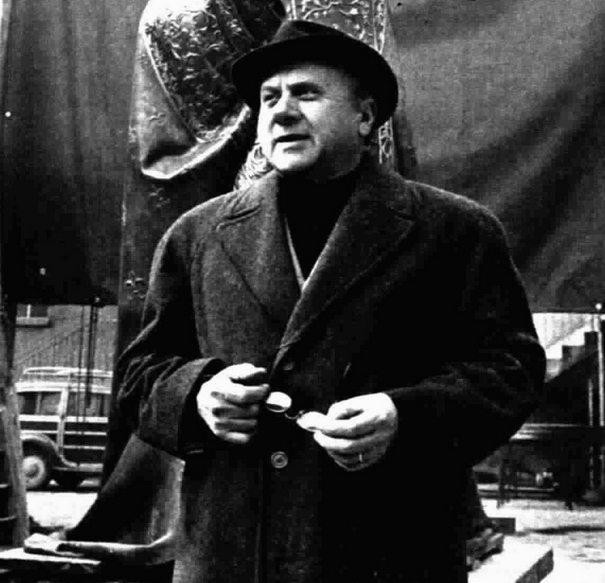
- Born: 15 December 1900; Linguaglossa, Italy
- Died: 13 September 1995 (aged 94); Milan, Italy
- Known for: Sculpture
- Notable work: Cavallo morente (Dying horse) I quattro cavalli di bronzo (The Four bronze horses) Siren etc.
- Movement: Contemporary
- Awards: Prize for sculpture in 1942 at the Biennale Internazionale d'Arte of Venice; Michelangelo Prize (1963)

Francesco Messina (15 December 1900 – 13 September 1995) was an Italian sculptor of the 20th century.

== Biography and career ==
Francesco Messina was born at Linguaglossa in the Province of Catania in a very poor family. Growing up in Genoa, where he also studied and lived until he was 32, he then moved to Milan.

Art historians have described Messina as an important figurative sculptor associated with the Novecento movement. His sculptures are held in museums in Bern, Zurich, Gotheenburg, Oslo, Munich, Paris, Barcelona, Berlin, Sao Paulo, Buenos Aires, Venice, Moscow, Saint Petersburg, Vienna, Washington, D.C., and Tokyo.

From 1922, he began exhibiting his work regularly at the Biennale Internazionale d'Arte in Venice and between 1926 and 1929, he took part in the expos organised by the art group Novecento Italiano in Milan. In 1932, he moved to Milan, where in 1934 he obtained a tenured professorship 1934 in Sculpture at the Accademia di Belle Arti di Brera, of which he became the director within two years.

During those years, about him wrote Carlo Carrà:

Francesco Messina's sculpture is characterised by a simple and grandiose manner, by an idealistic and classic procedure, able to give life to forms which become "ideal images".

Among Messina's students at the Accademia were sculptors Ernesto Ornati and Floriano Bodini.

In the 1930s, Messina exhibited at important collective expos of Italian art in Barcelona, Berlin, Bern, Gothenburg, Munich, Oslo, Paris, São Paulo, Zurich, while executing various sculptures in many Italian cities. In 1936 he was appointed director of the Accademia di Brera, which position he will keep until 1944. His work was also part of the sculpture event in the art competition at the 1936 Summer Olympics.

In 1938, Giorgio de Chirico in Rome and Salvatore Quasimodo in Turin presented two personal exhibitions of Messina's work. In 1942 he won the Sculpture Prize at the XXIII Biennale Internazionale d’arte of Venice, where he exhibited fifteen sculptures and seventeen drawings.

In 1943, Messina was appointed Academic Emeritus of Italy. On the collapse of the fascist regime, he was temporarily dismissed from the academy, only because he had been its director during the fascist period. However, by 1947, he had already regained his professorship. In the same period, the artist took part in the Graphic & Sculpture Expo at Buenos Aires, in the Muller Gallery, achieving a noticeable success. In 1949, he exhibited at the 3rd Sculpture International held by the Philadelphia Museum of Art in Philadelphia, together with Marino Marini and Picasso.

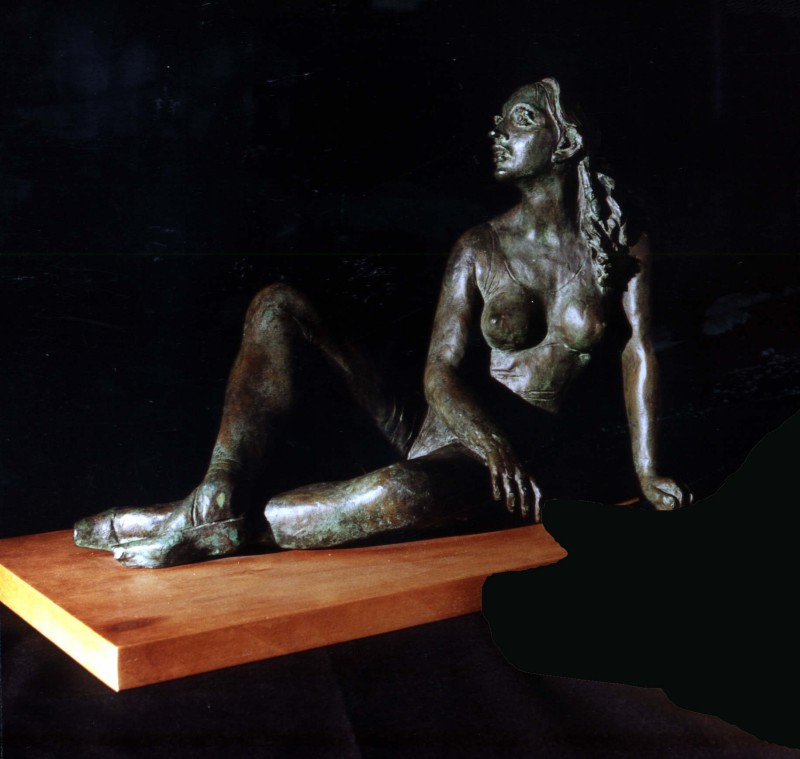
Romantica, c. 1973 (Fondazione Cariplo)

In 1956, he participated in a personal exhibition at the XXVIII Biennale di Venezia. In 1963, he produced the great monument to Pope Pius XII for St. Peter's Basilica in the Vatican, as well as the bust of Pietro Mascagni for the Teatro alla Scala. In the same year, he was awarded the Michelangelo Prize for Sculpture in Florence.

In 1966, Messina was commissioned by Italian RAI to create the Cavallo morente (Dying Horse), which became the Italian national TV logo, placed at the entrance of the RAI Building in Rome. In 1968, he sculpted the monument to Pope Pius XI for the Milan Cathedral. In the 1970s, the Vatican assigned him the Sala Borgia of the Vatican Gallery Paulus VI, dedicated to modern sacred art, as his permanent exhibition of twenty sculptures with a sacred theme.

In 1974, the City of Milan opened the Civico Museo-Studio Francesco Messina in the ancient former church of "San Sisto al Carrobbio". This will remain the artist's permanent and official studio until his death, also hosting c. eighty sculptures (gessos, polychrome terracottas, bronzes, waxes) and thirty graphic works (lithographies, pastels, acquarellos, pencil drawings) donated to the City of Milan.

In 1978, Messina attended two important exhibitions in the Soviet Union at the Pushkin Museum of Moscow and at the Hermitage of Saint Petersburg, both of which will open dedicated sections of his sculptures, with ca. 80 pieces on display. In 1981, in the former church of Saint Francis in Pordenone, an exhibition was held of his unpublished drawings, and in the same period, a sculpture display was held at the Palazzo Flangini-Biglia of Sacile. Between 1984 and 1986, his sculptures were exhibited at the Theseus Tempel of Vienna, at the Hirshhorn Museum of Washington and the Gallery Universe of Tokyo.

Until his death in Milan in 1995, Messina continued his work as a sculptor and painter and, assisted by his daughter Paola, amended and proofread numerous biographies dedicated to him.

== Works ==
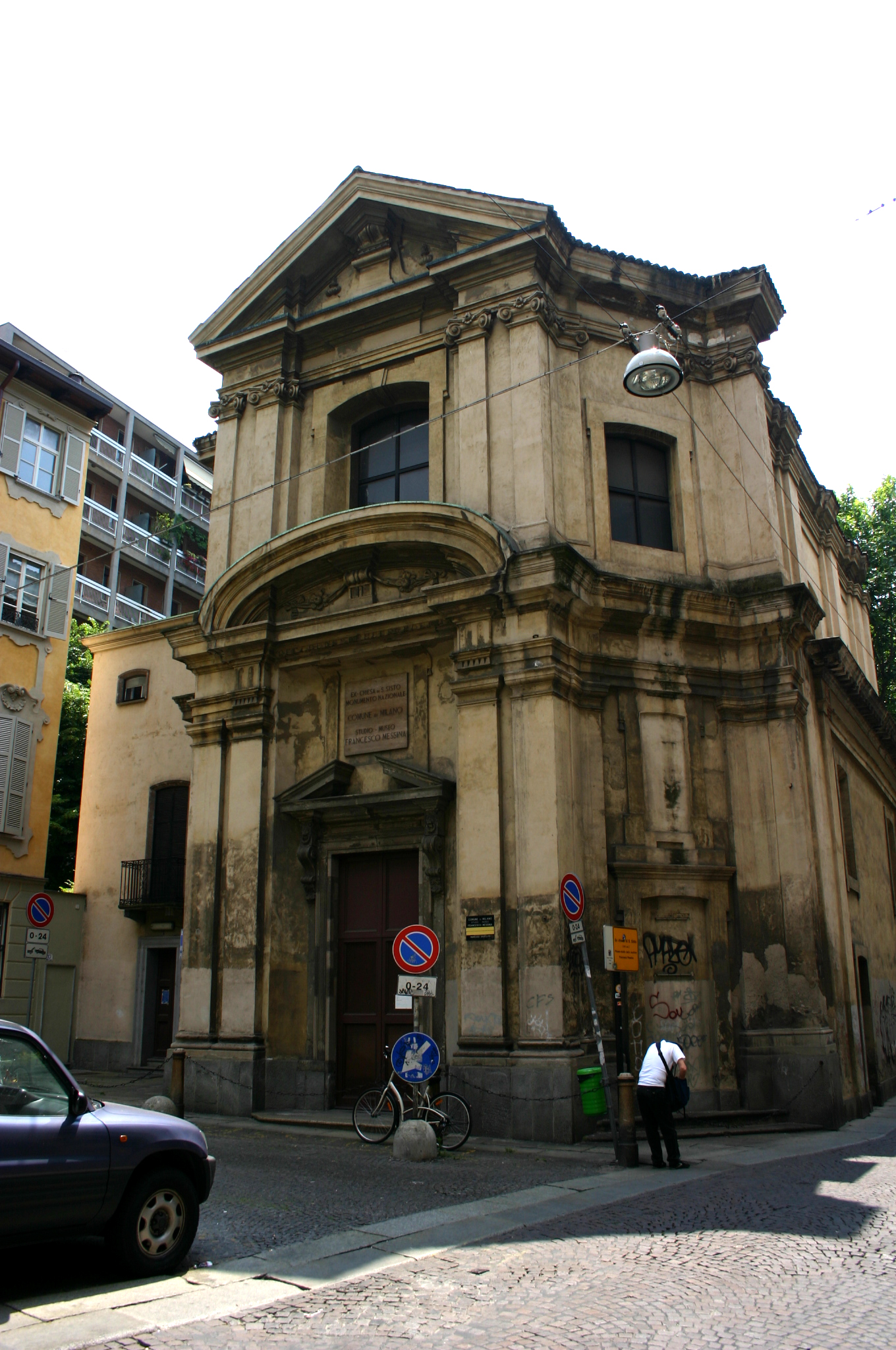
The Francesco Messina Museum, in the former Church of Saint Sixtus, Milan

- Pugilatore, Turin, Galleria civica d'arte moderna e contemporanea (1929)
- Nuotatore sulla spiaggia, Rome, Galleria nazionale d'arte moderna (1930)
- Monumento a Cristoforo Colombo, Chiavari (1935)
- Monumento equestre Regisole (or Raggiasole), Pavia (1937), in memory of the Roman monument of Emperor Antonino Pio destroyed in 1796
- Monumento Minerva armata, Pavia, University of Pavia (1938)
- Statue of Costanzo Ciano, La Spezia, Technical Naval Museum (1940)
- I quattro cavalli di bronzo (The Four Bronze Horses), Formello (Le Rughe) 1941–1970, Giovanni Leone Collection
- Statues of the Cimitero Monumentale di Milano, of the Church of Sant'Eugenio in Rome, and of the Christian Citadel of Assisi (1950–1960)
- Bust of Giacomo Puccini, Teatro alla Scala in Milan (1958)
- Beatrice, Dallas, Southern Methodist University (1959)
- Marble Monument to Catherine of Siena, in Castel Sant'Angelo Rome (1961–1962)
- Monument to Pius XII, St. Peter's Basilica, Vatican City (1963)
- Bust of Pietro Mascagni, Teatro alla Scala Milan (1963)
- Cavallo Morente (Dying Horse), RAI Building Rome (1966)
- Monument to Pius XI, Milan Cathedral (1968)
- Monumental Via Crucis with Madonna con Bambino in Carrara marble and Statue of Christ's Resurrection 6m high, San Giovanni Rotondo (1968–1980)
- Portrait of Ranieri III Grimaldi, Prince of Monaco (1974)
- Stallone ferito (Wounded horse), Catania, Vittorio Emanuele III Square
- Sirenetta, Catania, Europa Square

A selection of Messina's work (ca. 100) is permanently exhibited within the former Church of Saint Sixtus in Milan. ^{(see photo at right)}

== Awards ==
- Prize for Sculpture in 1942 at the Biennale Internazionale d'Arte of Venice
- Honorary citizen of the City of Milan from 1975. In 1979 the State Pinakothek of Munich organised a comprehensive Messina exhibition of his sculptures and graphic art.
- Honoris causa academic of the Fine Arts Academy of the Soviet Union from 1988 and Honorary Academic from 1990

== Bibliography ==
- The Medals by Francesco Messina, with essays by Jean Cocteau, Eugenio Montale, Salvatore Quasimodo - Scheiwiller, 1986. ISBN 88-7644-055-0
- Francesco Messina: 100 anni, sculture e disegni 1924-1993, by Toubert, Camilleri, Zichichi, Loi - Il Cigno Galileo Galilei. ISBN 88-7831-112-X
- Francesco Messina: Cento sculture, 1920-1994, by Marco Di Capua - Mazzotta. ISBN 88-202-1664-7
- Francesco Messina: Mostra celebrativa per i 90 anni: U.Allemandi. ISBN 88-422-0343-2
- Francesco Messina: sculture, disegni e poesie 1916-1993, by Franco Ragazzi, Maria Teresa Orengo - Mazzotta. ISBN 88-202-1595-0
- Francesco Messina, ritratti, by Antonio Paolucci, Alberto Fiz, Eliana Princi - Skira. ISBN 88-8118-140-1
- Cavalli e tori di Francesco Messina, Edizioni Artes 1998. ISBN 88-7724-025-3
- Francesco Messina, Le opere e i libri, Electa 1999
- Lettere e poesie a Bianca e Francesco Messina, by Eugenio Montale - Scheiwiller, 2007. ISBN 88-7644-205-7
- Elena Lissoni, Francesco Messina, online catalogue Artgate by Fondazione Cariplo, 2010, CC BY-SA.

== See also ==
- Figurative art
- Plastic Arts
- Novecento
