= Mascali =

Mascali Masháli (Greek)
- Comune
- Comune di Mascali
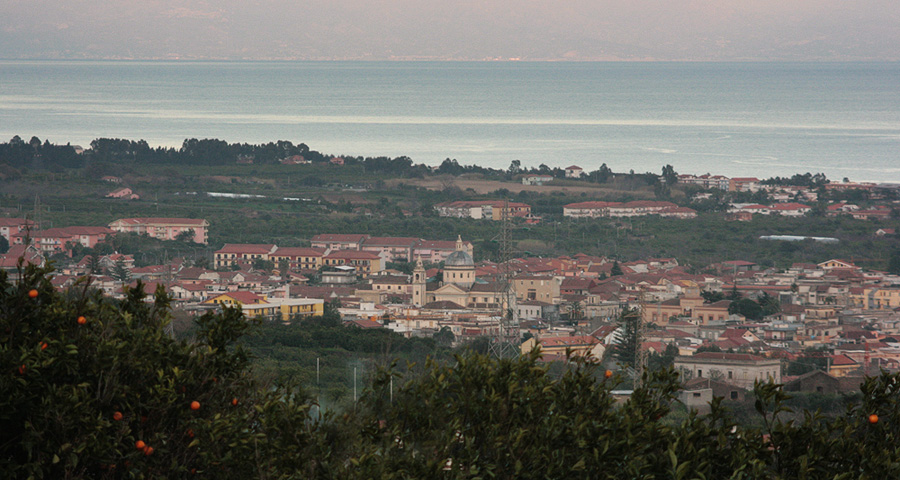

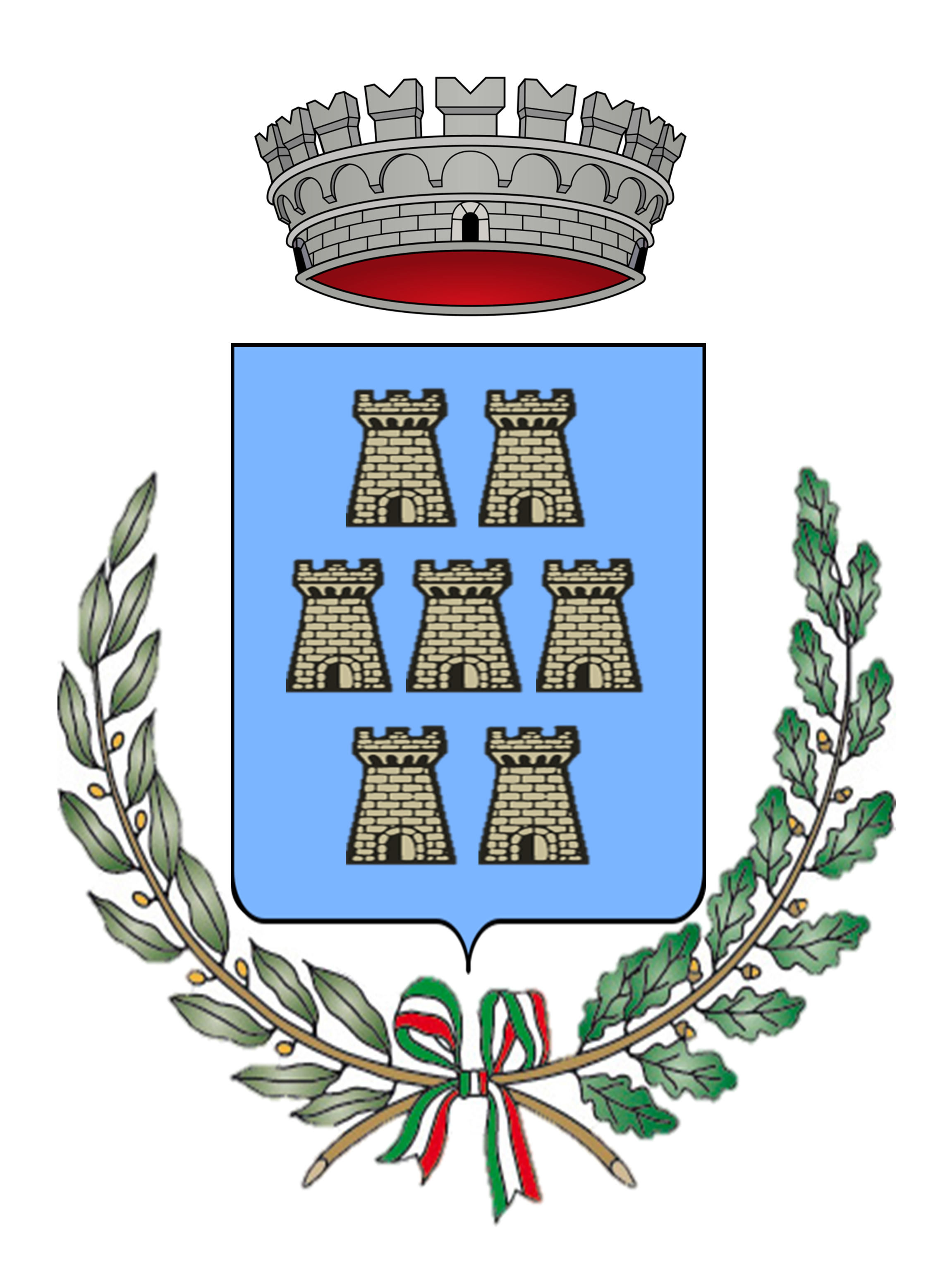
- Coat of arms

- Location within Italy Location within Sicily
- Coordinates: 37°45′N 15°12′E
- Country: Italy
- Region: Sicily
- Metropolitan city: Catania (CT)
- Frazioni: Carrabba, Fondachello, Montargano, Nunziata, Portosalvo, Puntalazzo, Santa Venera, Sant'Anna, Sant'Antonino, Tagliaborse

Government
  - Mayor: Luigi Messina

Area
  - Total: 37.7 km^{2} (14.6 sq mi)
- Elevation: 18 m (59 ft)

Population (30 November 2016)
  - Total: 14,234
  - Density: 378/km^{2} (978/sq mi)
- Demonym: Mascalesi
- Time zone: UTC+1 (CET)
  - Summer (DST): UTC+2 (CEST)
- Postal code: 95016, 95010
- Dialing code: 095
- Patron saint: St. Leonard of Noblac
- Saint day: 6 November
- Website: www.comune.mascali.ct.it

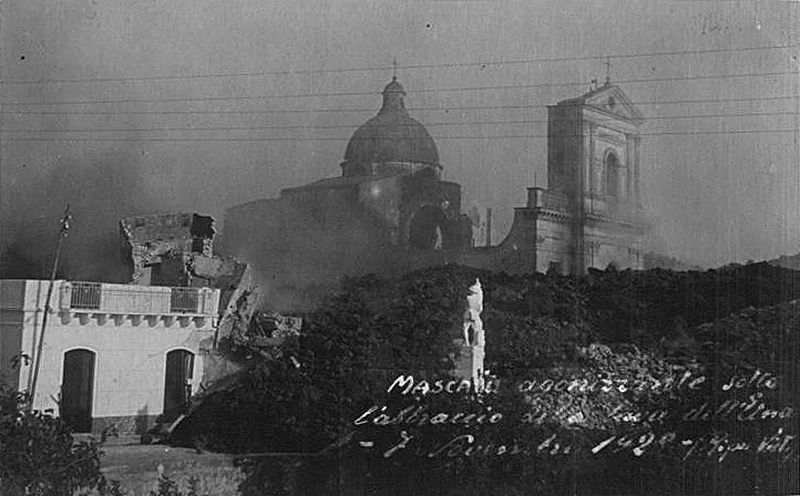
The old city of Mascali destroyed by lava flow in 1928.

Mascali (Sicilian: Màscali) is a comune (municipality) in the Metropolitan City of Catania in the Italian region Sicily, located about 170 kilometres (110 mi) east of Palermo and about 30 kilometres (19 mi) northeast of Catania.

The town of Mascali was entirely rebuilt after its almost complete destruction by lava from the nearby Etna in 1928.
