= Mount Etna =

Active volcano on the east coast of Sicily, Italy

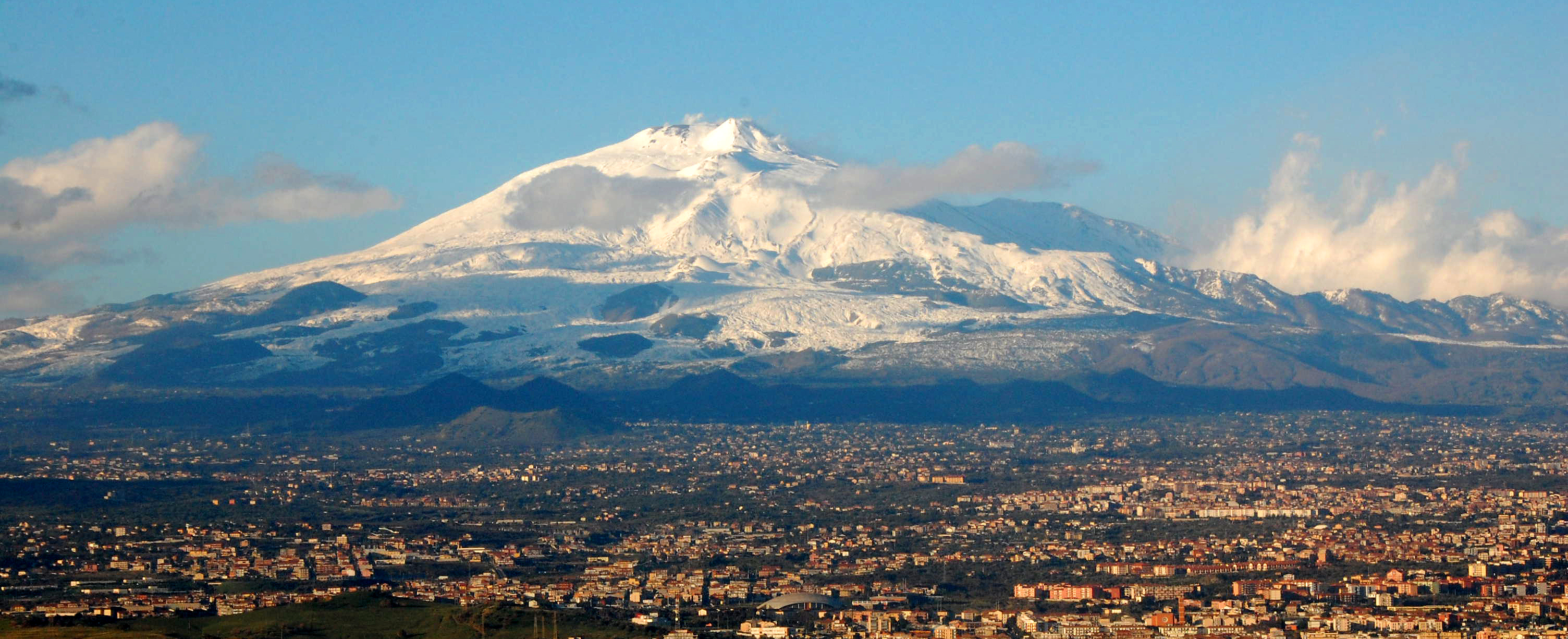
- Etna with the city of Catania in the foreground (December 2007)

Highest point
- Elevation: 3,403 m (11,165 ft)(varies)
- Prominence: 3,403 m (11,165 ft); Ranked 54th
- Isolation: 998.79 km (620.62 mi)
- Listing: Ultra
- Coordinates: 37°45.3′N 14°59.7′E

Naming
- Native name: Muncibbeḍḍu (Sicilian)

Geography
- Location within Sicily Location within Italy
- Location: Metropolitan City of Catania, Sicily, Italy

Geology
- Rock age: 350,000–500,000 years
- Mountain type: Composite volcano or Stratovolcano
- Last eruption: 7 August 2026 (ongoing)

UNESCO World Heritage Site
- Criteria: Natural: viii
- Reference: 1427
- Inscription: 2013 (37th Session)
- Area: 19,237 ha (47,540 acres)
- Buffer zone: 26,220 ha (64,800 acres)

Topographic map of Mount Etna and its surroundings

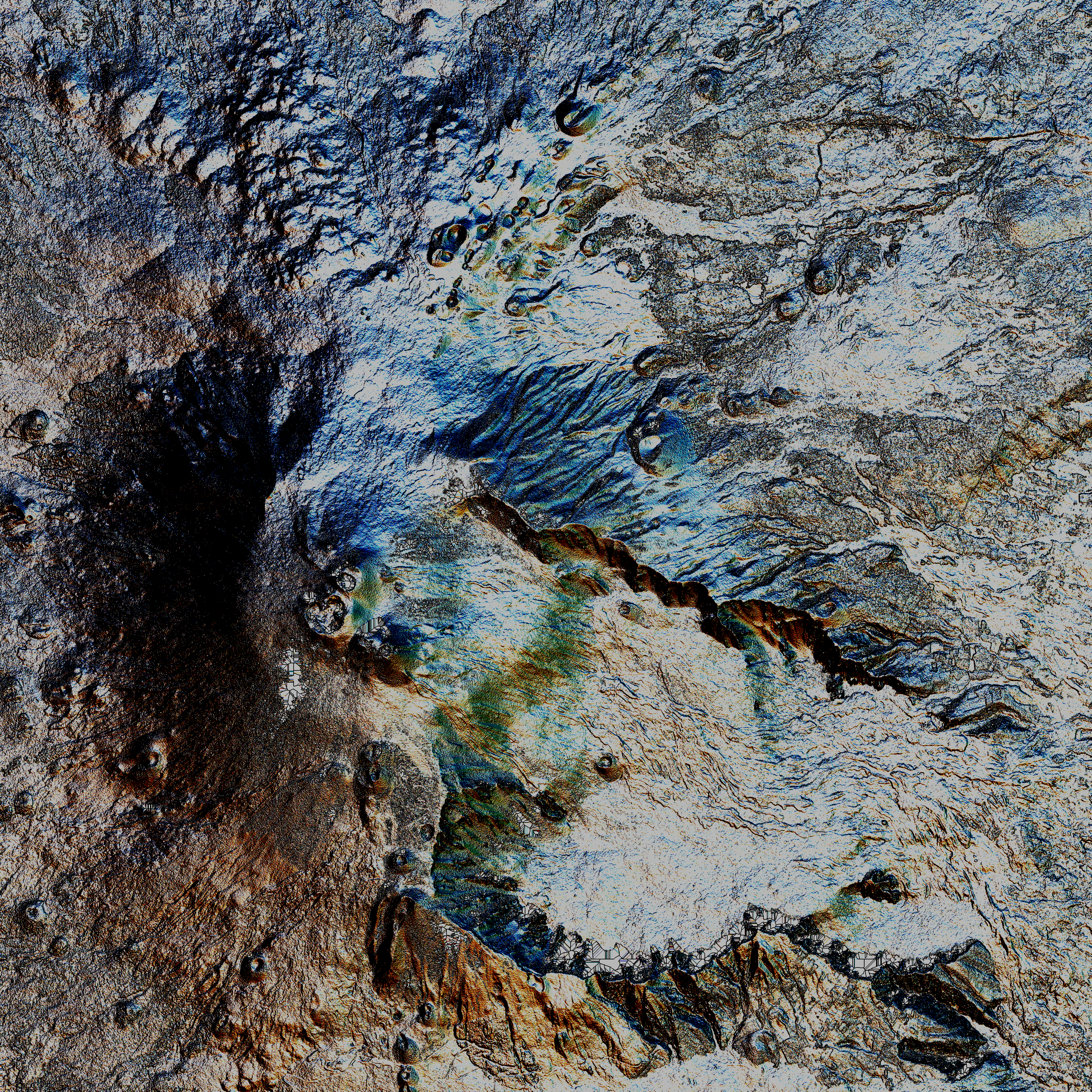
Multidirectional hillshade relief of Mount Etna showing the summit and Valle del Bove on the lower right

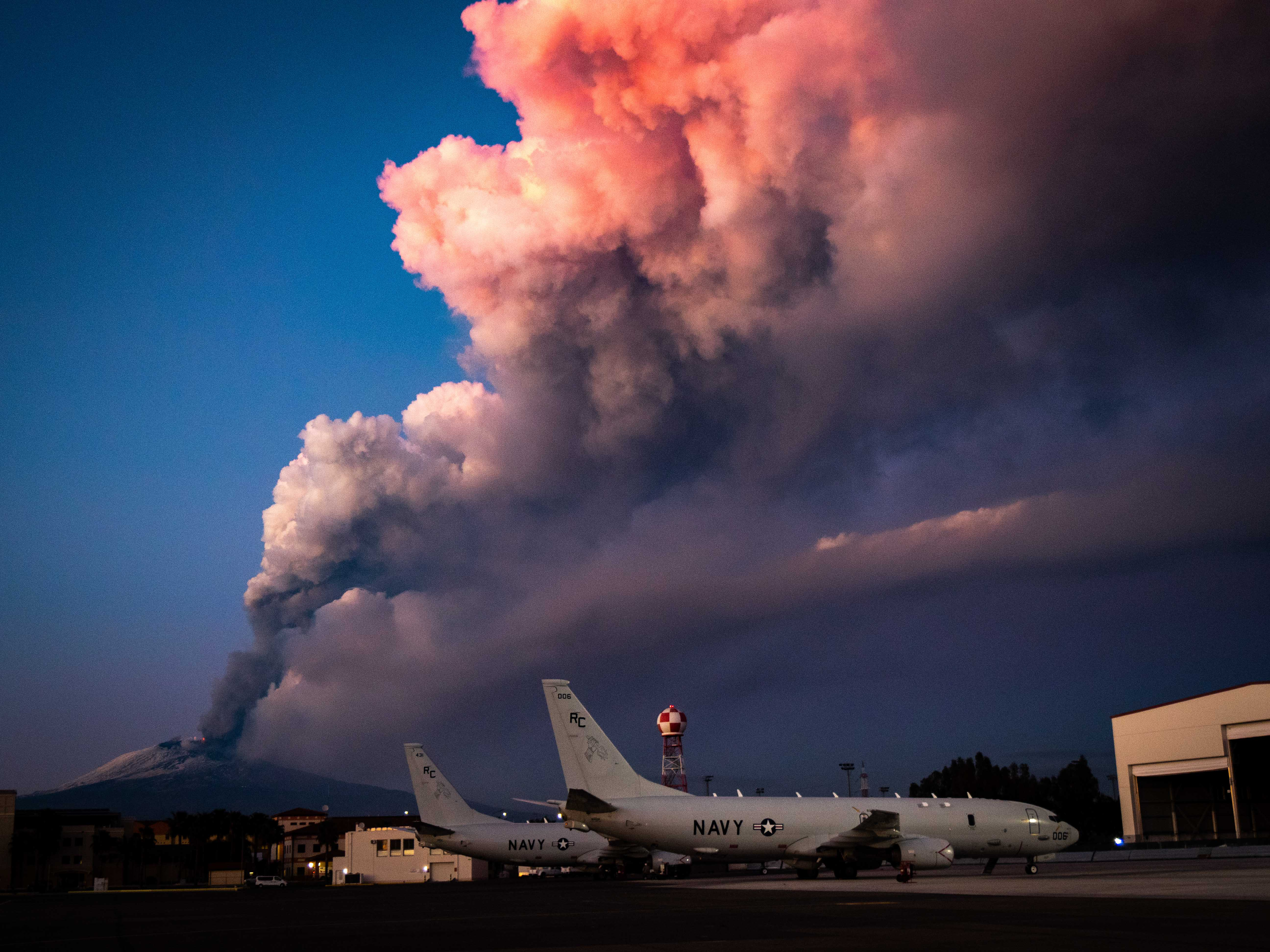
February 2021 eruption seen from Naval Air Station Sigonella

Map of municipalities in the Metropolitan City of Catania (Mount Etna at top right)

Mount Etna, or simply Etna, (Note: Italian: Etna [ˈɛtna] or Mongibello [mondʒiˈbɛllo]; Sicilian: Muncibbeḍḍu [mʊntʃɪbˈbɛɖɖʊ], Èttina or a Muntagna; Latin: Aetna; Ancient Greek: Αἴτνα or Αἴτνη) is an active stratovolcano on the east coast of Sicily, Italy, in the Metropolitan City of Catania, between the cities of Messina and Catania. It is located above the convergent plate margin between the African Plate and the Eurasian Plate. It is one of the tallest active volcanoes in Europe, and the tallest peak in Italy south of the Alps with a current height (September 2024) of 3,403 m (11,165 ft), though this varies with summit eruptions. For instance, in 2021 the southeastern crater reached a height of 3,357 m (11,014 ft), but was then surpassed by the Voragine crater after the summer 2024 eruptions.

Etna covers an area of 1,190 km^{2} (459 sq mi) with a basal circumference of 140 km (87 miles). This makes it by far the largest of the four active volcanoes in Italy, being about two and a half times the height of the next largest, Mount Vesuvius. Only Mount Teide on Tenerife in the Canary Islands surpasses it in the whole of the European–North-African region west of the Black Sea.

Mount Etna is one of the world's most active volcanoes and is in an almost constant state of activity. The fertile volcanic soils produced from this activity support extensive agriculture, with vineyards and orchards spread across the lower slopes of the mountain and the broad Plain of Catania to the south. Due to its history of recent activity and nearby population, Mount Etna has been designated a Decade Volcano by the United Nations. In June 2013, it was added to the list of UNESCO World Heritage Sites.

== Etymology and mythology ==
One view is that the word Etna is from the Greek αἴθω (aíthō), meaning "to burn", through monophthongization of the Ancient Greek pronunciation as seen in Koine Greek phonology, or possibly from a Siculian (or Sicanian?) dialect word (*aith-na, "the fiery one"?) of the same Indo-European origin, namely the root *h₂eydʰ- "to burn; fire".

Another view is that the name is derived from the Phoenician word attuna meaning 'furnace' or 'chimney'. In Classical Greek, it is called Αἴτνη (Aítnē), a name given also to Catania and the city originally known as Inessa. In Latin it is called Aetna. In Arabic, it is called Jabal al-Nār (جبل النار, 'the Mountain of Fire'). According to both Roman and Greek mythology, Vulcan/Hephaestus, the god of blacksmithing, had his forge under Mount Etna.

In Greek mythology, the deadly monster Typhon was trapped under this mountain by Zeus, the god of the sky and thunder and king of gods, and the forges of Hephaestus were said also to be underneath it.

The volcano is also known as Muncibbeḍḍu in Sicilian and Mongibello in Italian, generally regarded as deriving from the Romance word monte/munti plus the Arabic word jabal (جبل), both meaning 'mountain'. According to another hypothesis, the term comes from the Latin Mulciber (qui ignem mulcet, 'he who placates the fire'), one of the Latin names of the god Vulcan. Today, the name Mongibello is used for the area of Mount Etna containing the two central craters, and the craters located southeast and northeast of the volcanic cone.

The name Mongibel is found in Arthurian Romance, as the name of the otherworld castle (or realm) of Morgan le Fay and her half-brother, King Arthur, localised at Etna, according to traditions concerning them derived from the stories told by the Breton conteurs who accompanied the Norman occupiers of Sicily. What were originally Welsh conceptions concerning a dwarf king of a paradisal, Celtic underworld became attached to the quasi-historic figure of Arthur as "Ruler of the Antipodes" and were then transplanted into a Sicilian milieu, by Bretons impressed by the already otherworldly associations of the great, volcanic mountain of their new home. Mediaevalist Roger Sherman Loomis quotes passages from the works of Gervase of Tilbury and Caesarius of Heisterbach (dating from the late twelfth century) featuring accounts of Arthur's returning of a lost horse which had strayed into his subterranean kingdom beneath Etna. Caesarius quotes as his authority for the story a certain canon Godescalcus of Bonn, who considered it a matter of historical fact of the time of Emperor Henry's conquest of Sicily c. 1194. Caesarius employs in his account the Latin phrase in monte Gyber ('within Etna') to describe the location of Arthur's kingdom.

The Fada de Gibel of the Castle of Gibaldar (Fairy of Etna) appears in Jaufre, the only surviving Arthurian romance in the Occitan language, the composition of which is dated to between 1180 and 1230. However, in Jaufre, while it is clear from her name that the fairy queen in question is Morgan le Fay, the rich underworld queendom of which she is the mistress is accessed not through a fiery grotto on the slopes of Etna, but through a 'fountain' (i.e., a spring) – a circumstance more in keeping with Morgan's original watery, rather than fiery, associations, before her incorporation into the folklore of Sicily. Another Sicilian conception of the fairy realm or castle of Morgan le Fay is the Fata Morgana, an optical phenomenon common in the Strait of Messina.

== History of volcanic eruptions ==
Eruptions of Etna follow multiple patterns. Most occur at the summit, where there are five distinct craters: the Northeast Crater, the Voragine, the Bocca Nuova, and two at the Southeast Crater Complex. Other eruptions occur on the flanks, which have more than 300 vents ranging in size from small holes in the ground to large craters hundreds of metres across. Summit eruptions can be highly explosive and spectacular but rarely threaten the inhabited areas around the volcano. In contrast, flank eruptions can occur down to a few hundred metres altitude, close to or even well within inhabited areas. Numerous villages and small towns lie around or on cones of past flank eruptions. Since the year AD 1600, at least 60 flank eruptions and countless summit eruptions have occurred; nearly half of these have happened since the start of the 20th century. Since 2000, Etna has had four flank eruptions – in 2001, 2002–2003, 2004–2005, and 2008–2009. Summit eruptions occurred in 2006, 2007–2008, January–April 2012, in July–October 2012, December 2018, and again in February 2021.

=== Geological history ===
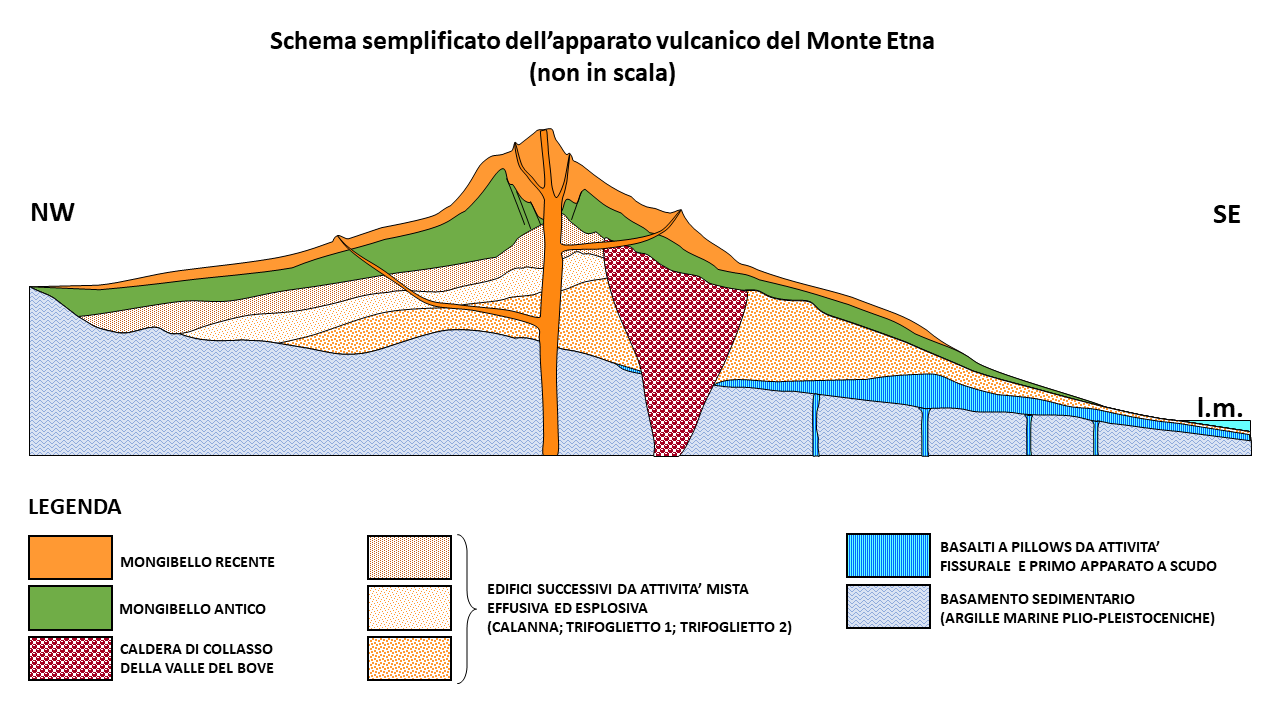
Simplified geological cross section of the Mount Etna volcanic complex (not to scale), showing its evolution from an early stage of submarine fissural activity, producing pillow lavas and a first shield volcano, to a subsequent mixed effusive and explosive activity building three main stratovolcano stages (Monte Calanna; Trifoglietto 1; Trifoglietto 2), then to the present Mongibello system (which has developed in two successive stages from about 15,000 years ago). The volcanic activity has gradually shifted from SE to NW (from offshore to onshore). The Valle del Bove is the former eastern flank of the volcano, which collapsed about 64,000 years ago and thus allows the older volcanic edifices to be recognized.

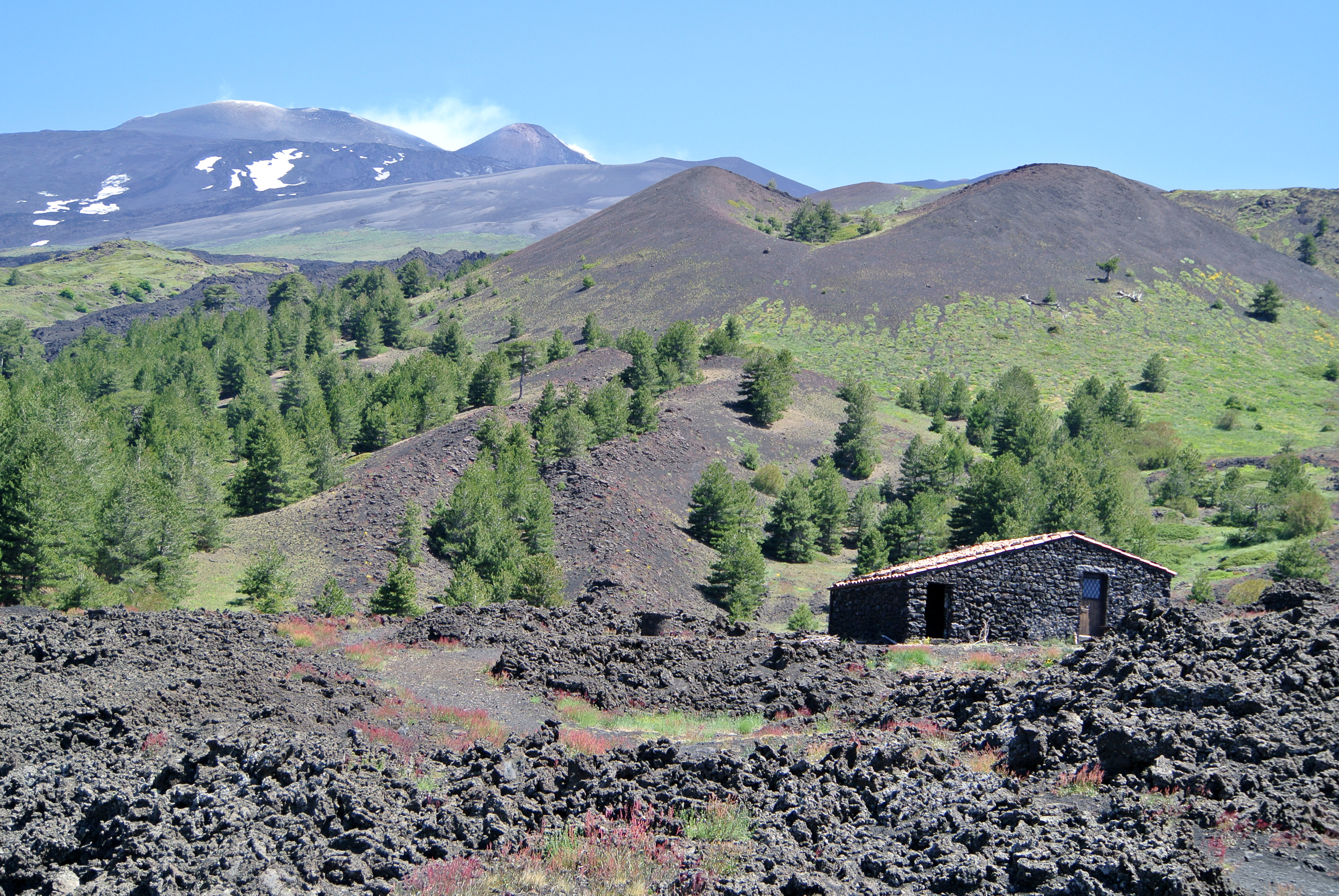
Mount Etna from the south with the smoking peak in the upper left and a lateral crater in the centre

Volcanic activity first took place at Etna about 500,000 years ago, with eruptions occurring beneath the sea off the ancient coastline of Sicily. About 300,000 years ago, volcanism began occurring to the southwest of the summit (centre top of the volcano), then activity moved towards the present centre 170,000 years ago. Eruptions at this time built up the first major volcanic edifice, forming a stratovolcano in alternating explosive and effusive eruptions. The growth of the mountain was occasionally interrupted by major eruptions, leading to the collapse of the summit to form calderas.

From about 35,000 to 15,000 years ago, Etna experienced some highly explosive eruptions, generating large pyroclastic flows, which left extensive ignimbrite deposits. Ash from these eruptions has been found as far away as south of Rome's border, 800 km (497 mi) to the north.

Thousands of years ago, the eastern flank of the mountain experienced a catastrophic collapse, generating an enormous landslide in an event similar to that seen in the 1980 eruption of Mount St. Helens. The landslide left a large depression in the side of the volcano, known as 'Valle del Bove' (Valley of the Ox). Research published in 2006 suggested this occurred around 8,000 years ago, and caused a huge tsunami, which left its mark in several places in the eastern Mediterranean.

The steep walls of the valley have suffered subsequent collapses on numerous occasions. The strata exposed in the valley walls provide an important and easily accessible record of Etna's eruptive history.

The most recent collapse event at the summit of Etna is thought to have occurred about 2,000 years ago, forming what is known as the Piano Caldera. This caldera has been almost entirely filled by subsequent lava eruptions but is still visible as a distinct break in the slope of the mountain near the base of the present-day summit cone.

Mount Etna is moving towards the Mediterranean Sea at an average rate of 14 mm (0.55 in) per year, the massif sliding on an unconsolidated layer above the older sloping terrain.

=== Historical eruptions ===
The first known report of an eruption at Etna is that of Diodorus Siculus, ca. 1400 BCE.

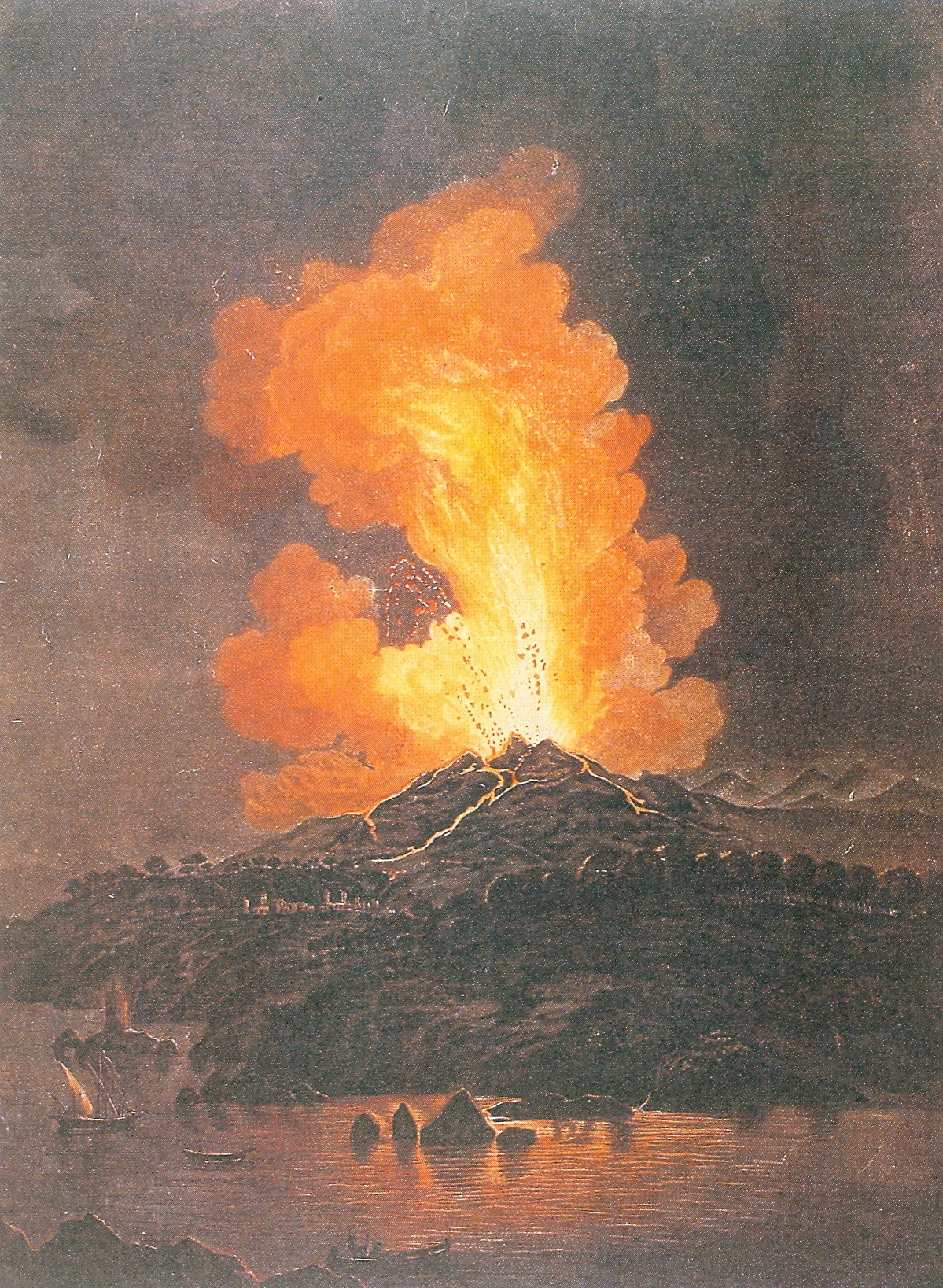
The 1766 eruption depicted in a coloured engraving by Italian painter Alessandro D'Anna, c. 1770

In 396 BCE, an eruption of Etna reportedly thwarted the Carthaginians in their attempt to advance on Syracuse during the Second Sicilian War.

A particularly violent explosive (Plinian) summit eruption occurred in 122 BCE, and caused heavy tephra falls to the southeast, including the town of Catania, where many roofs collapsed. To help with reconstruction after the devastating effects of the eruption, the Roman government exempted the population of Catania from paying taxes for ten years.

An eruption of Etna in 44 BCE was followed by famine in China (43 BCE), the Roman Republic, and Egypt, with Plutarch (among others) suggesting a causal link; however, an eruption of Mount Okmok early the following year is a more likely cause.

The Roman poet Virgil gave what was probably a first-hand description of an eruption in the Aeneid.

During the first 1500 years CE, many eruptions went unrecorded (or records have been lost); among the more significant are: (1) an eruption in about 1030 CE near Monte Ilice on the lower southeast flank, which produced a lava flow that travelled about 10 km, reaching the sea north of Acireale; the villages of Santa Tecla and Stazzo are built on the broad delta built by this lava flow into the sea; (2) an eruption in about 1160 (or 1224), from a fissure at only 350–450 m (1,148–1,476 ft) elevation on the south-southeast flank near the village of Mascalucia, whose lava flow reached the sea just to the north of Catania, in the area now occupied by the portion of the city named Ognina.

Rabban Bar Sauma, a Chinese traveller to the West, recorded the eruption of Etna on 18 June 1287.

The 1669 eruption, Etna's most destructive since 122 BCE, started on 11 March 1669 and produced lava flows that destroyed at least 10 villages on its southern flank before reaching the city walls of the town of Catania five weeks later, on 15 April. The lava was largely diverted by these walls into the sea to the south of the city, filling the harbour of Catania. A small portion of lava eventually broke through a fragile section of the city walls on the western side of Catania and destroyed a few buildings before stopping in the rear of the Benedictine monastery, without reaching the centre of the town. Contrary to widespread reports of up to 15,000 (or even 20,000) human fatalities caused by the lava, contemporaneous accounts written both in Italian and English mention no deaths related to the 1669 eruption (but give very precise figures of the number of buildings destroyed, the area of cultivated land lost, and the economic damage). Therefore, it is uncertain where the enormous number of fatalities can be attributed. One possibility is confusion between this eruption and an earthquake that devastated southeast Sicily (including Catania) 24 years later in 1693. A study on the damage and fatalities caused by eruptions of Etna in historical times reveals that only 77 human deaths are attributable with certainty to eruptions of Etna, most recently in 1987 when two tourists were killed by a sudden explosion near the summit.

Since 1750, seven of Etna's eruptions have had durations of more than five years, more than any other volcano except Vesuvius.

=== Modern-day eruptions (1923–present) ===
As "Europe's most active volcano", eruptions occur frequently (with as many as 16 eruptions taking place in 2001). However, several eruptions of note have occurred over the last century.

A major eruption took place in June 1923, lasting from 6 June until 29 June. A large lava flow from an eruption in 1928 led to the destruction of a population centre for the first time since the 1669 eruption. The eruption started high on Etna's northeast flank on 2 November. Then new eruptive fissures opened at decreasing elevations down the flank of the volcano. The third and most vigorous of these fissures opened late on 4 November at an unusually low elevation, approximately 1,200 m (3,937 ft) above sea-level, in a zone known as Ripe della Naca. The village of Mascali, lying down-slope of the Ripe della Naca, was almost completely destroyed in two days. Only a church and a few surrounding buildings survived in the north part of the village, called Sant'Antonino or "il quartiere". During the last days of the eruption, the flow interrupted the Messina-Catania railway line and destroyed the train station of Mascali. The event was used by Benito Mussolini's fascist regime for propaganda purposes, with the evacuation, aid, and rebuilding operations being presented as models of fascist planning. Mascali was rebuilt on a new site, and its church contains the Italian fascist symbol of the torch, placed above the statue of Jesus Christ.

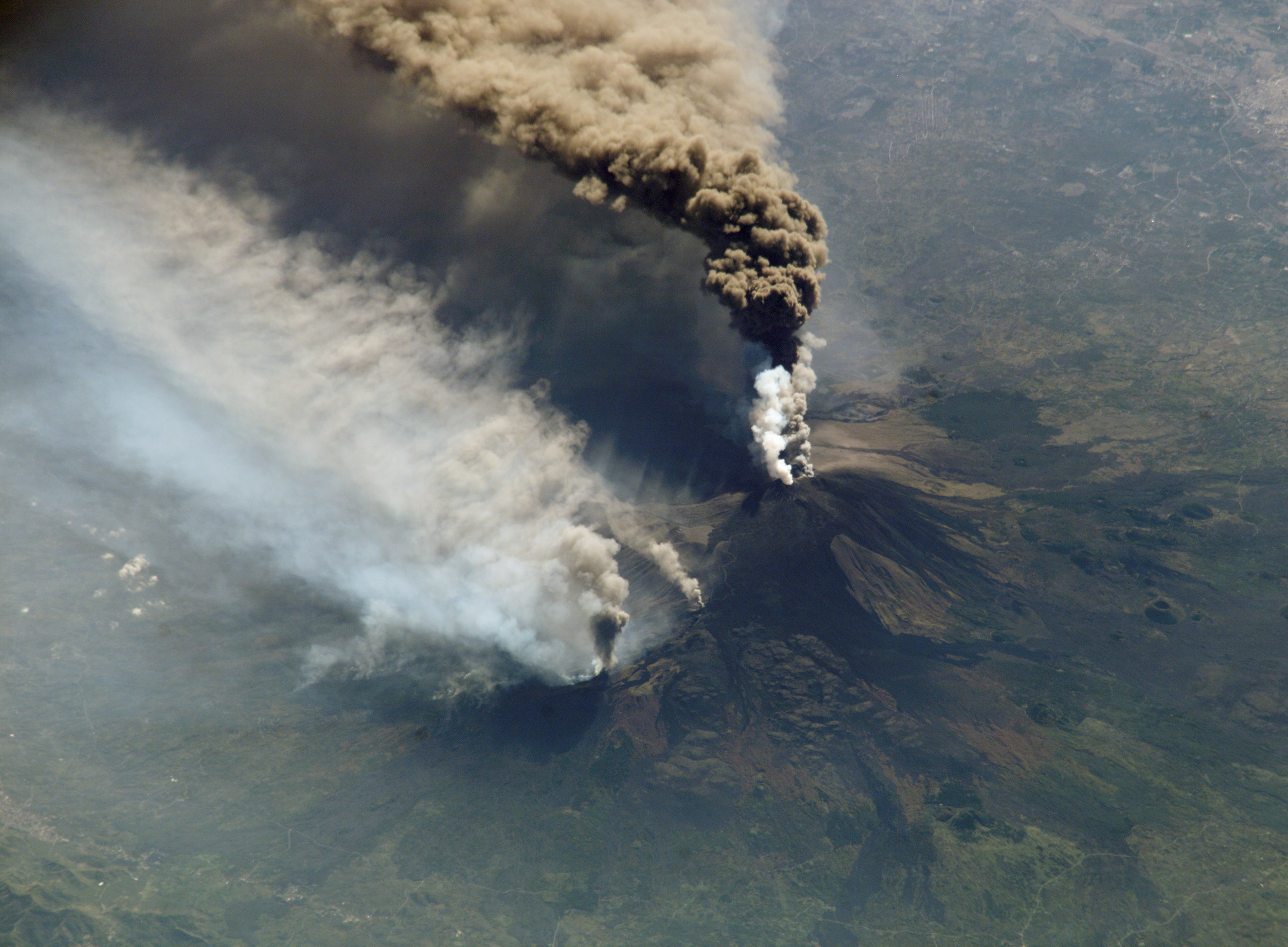
Etna's 2002 eruption, photographed from the ISS

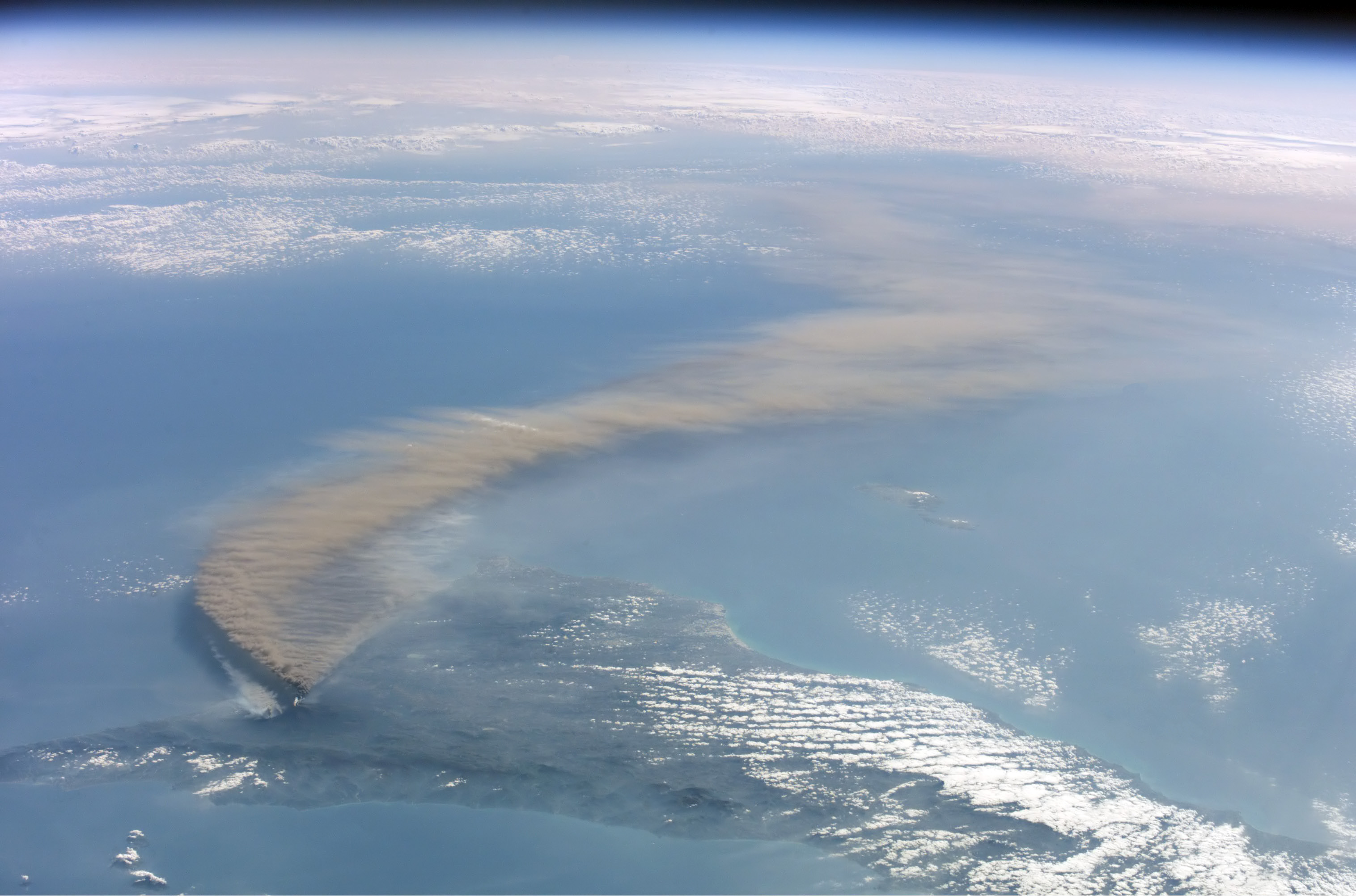
Etna's 2002 eruption, photographed from the ISS

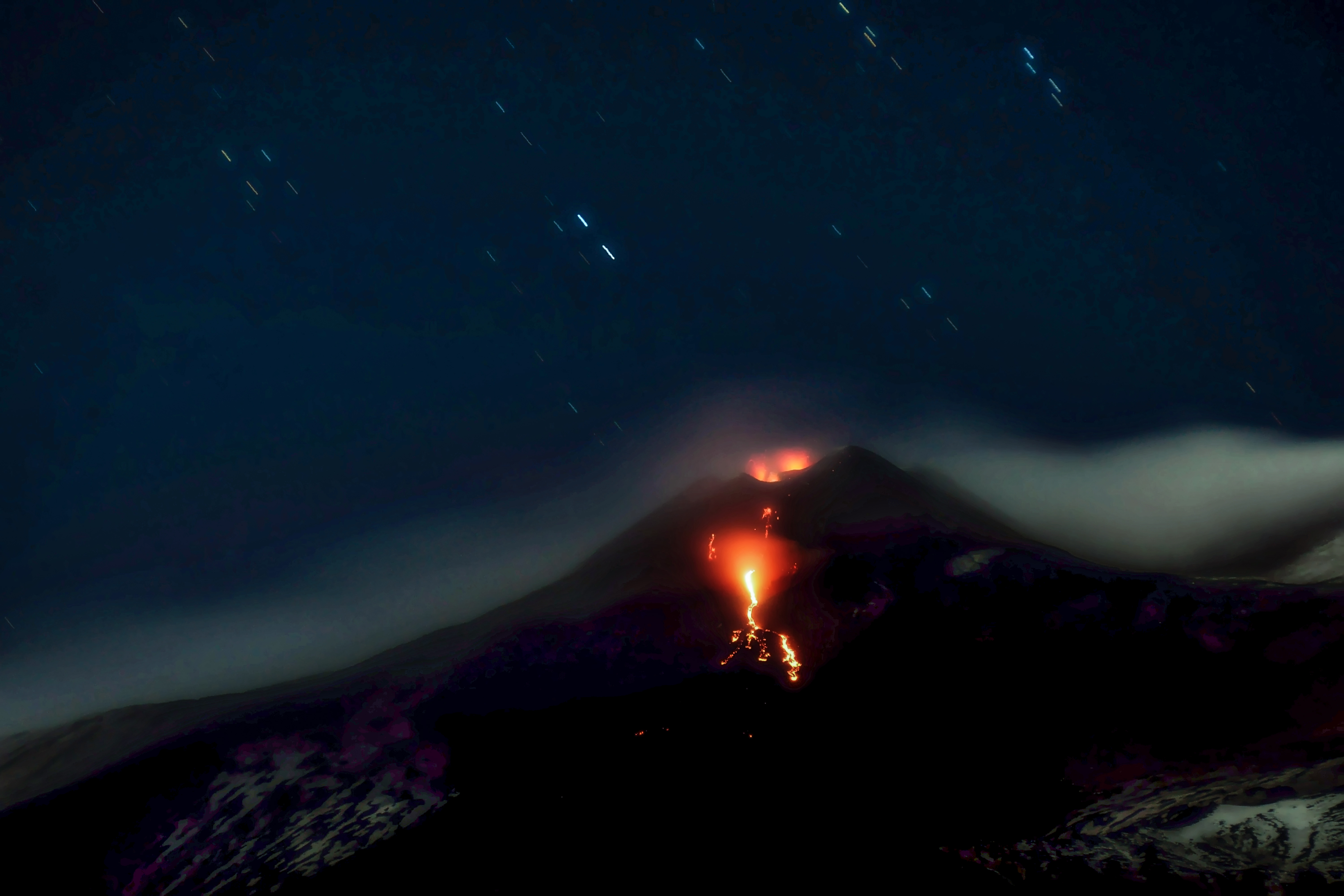
Long exposure image of a "dual-vent" eruption from Mount Etna's NSEC (New South East Crater)

Video of Etna's November 2013 eruption

Other major 20th-century eruptions occurred in 1949, 1971, 1979, 1981, 1983 and 1991–1993. In 1971, lava buried the Etna Observatory (built in the late 19th century), destroyed the first generation of the Etna cable-car, and seriously threatened several small villages on Etna's east flank. In March 1981, the town of Randazzo on the northwestern flank of Etna narrowly escaped destruction by unusually fast-moving lava flows. That eruption was remarkably similar to one in 1928 that destroyed Mascali.

=== 1991–1993 eruption ===
The 1991–1993 eruption saw the town of Zafferana Etnea threatened by advancing lava flows, but diversion efforts, including Operation Hot Rock, saved the town with the loss of only one building a few hundred metres from its margin. Initial measures involved constructing earth barriers perpendicular to the flow direction, in the hope that the eruption would end before the artificial basins behind the barriers filled. When the lava eventually overran these defenses, engineers turned to explosives near the source of the flow to disrupt a highly efficient lava tube system that carried lava up to 7 km (4 mi) downslope without significant cooling. A major explosion on 23 May 1992 destroyed the tube and diverted the lava into a new artificial channel far from Zafferana, making it unlikely that a long lava tube could re-form quickly. Shortly after the blasting, the eruption’s output declined, and for the remainder of the eruption (until 30 March 1993) lava never again advanced near the town.

The Rifugio Sapienza is near the site of a cable car station which had previously been destroyed in the 1983 eruption; it has now been rebuilt. Following a slow and non-destructive lava outflow on the upper southeastern flank between September 2004 and March 2005, intense eruptions occurred at the Southeast Crater in July–December 2006. These were followed by four episodes of lava fountaining, again at the Southeast Crater, on 29 March, 11 April, 29 April and 7 May 2007. Ash emissions and Strombolian explosions started from a vent on the eastern side of the Southeast Crater in mid-August 2007.

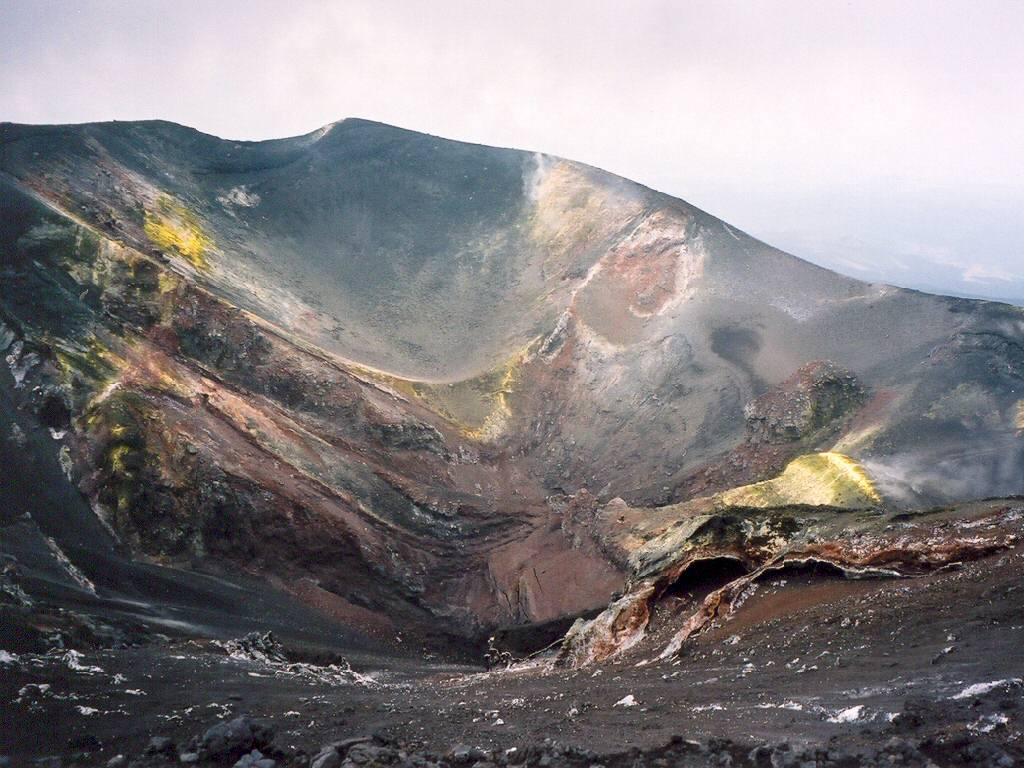
A lateral crater of the 2002–2003 eruption near the Torre del Filosofo, about 450 m (1,480 ft) below Etna's summit

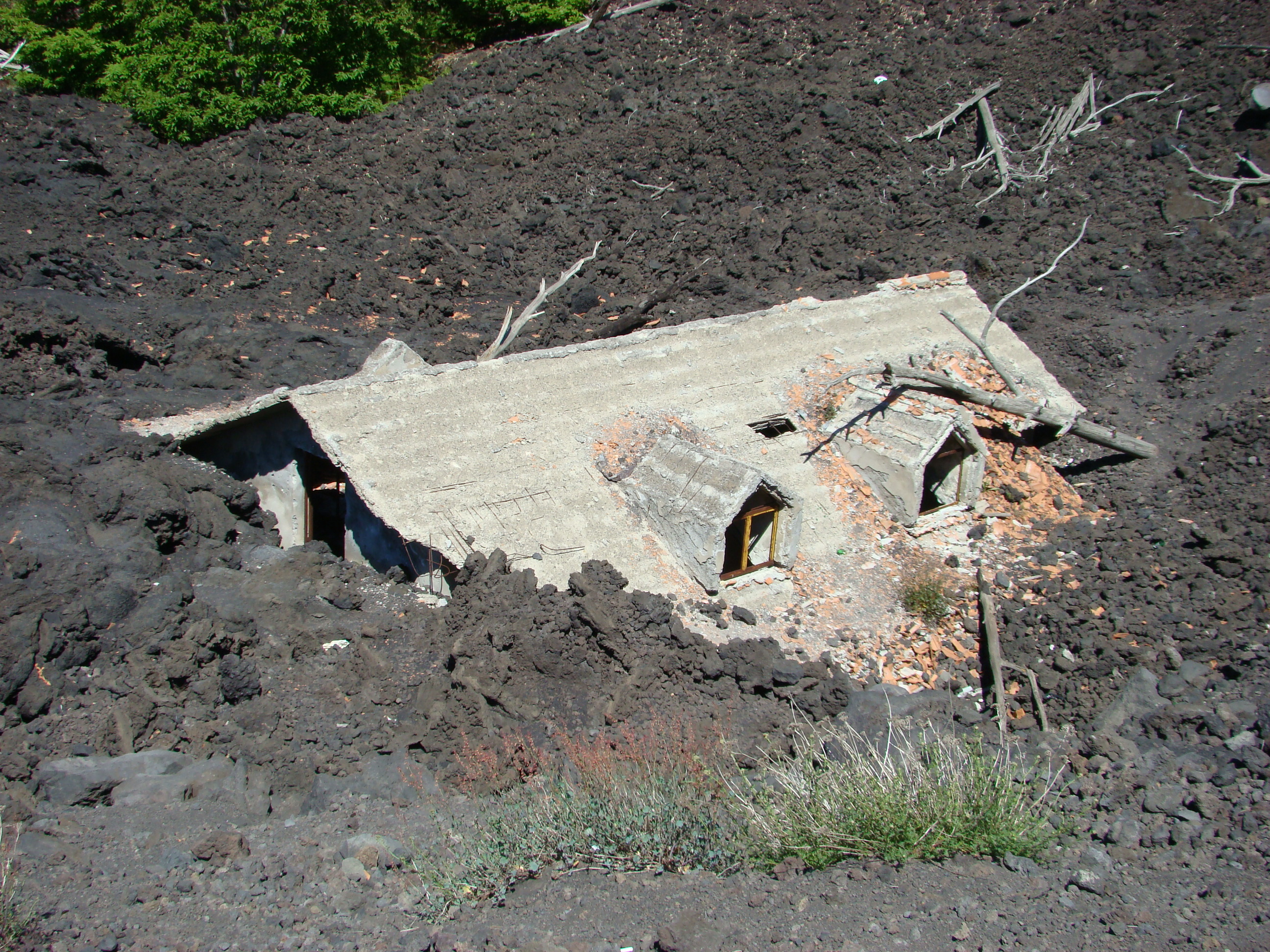
House destroyed by lava on the slopes of Etna

=== July–August 2001 eruption ===
In July–August 2001, following six years (1995–2001) of unusually intense activity at the four summit craters of Etna, the volcano produced its first flank eruption since 1991–1993. This eruption, which involved activity from seven distinct eruptive fissures mostly on the south slope of the volcano, was well covered by the mass-media because it occurred at the height of the tourist season and numerous reporters and journalists were already in Italy to cover the G8 summit in Genoa. It also occurred close to one of the tourist areas on the volcano, and thus was easily accessible. Part of the "Etna Sud" tourist area, including the arrival station of the Etna cable car, were damaged by this eruption, which otherwise was a rather modest-sized event by Etna standards.

=== 2002–2003 eruption ===
In 2002–2003, a much larger eruption threw up a huge column of ash that could easily be seen from space and fell as far away as Libya, 600 km (370 mi) south across the Mediterranean Sea. Seismic activity in this eruption caused the eastern flanks of the volcano to slip by up to two metres, and many houses on the flanks of the volcano experienced structural damage. The eruption also completely destroyed the tourist station Piano Provenzana, on the northeastern flank of the volcano, and part of the tourist station "Etna Sud" around the Rifugio Sapienza on the south flank. Footage from the eruptions was recorded by Lucasfilm and integrated into the landscape of the planet Mustafar in the 2005 film Star Wars: Episode III – Revenge of the Sith. The Rifugio Sapienza is near the site of a cable car station which had previously been destroyed in the 1983 eruption; it has now been rebuilt. Following a slow and non-destructive lava outflow on the upper southeastern flank between September 2004 and March 2005, intense eruptions occurred at the Southeast Crater in July–December 2006. These were followed by four episodes of lava fountaining, again at the Southeast Crater, on 29 March, 11 April, 29 April and 7 May 2007. Ash emissions and Strombolian explosions started from a vent on the eastern side of the Southeast Crater in mid-August 2007.

=== September 2007 eruption ===
On 4 September 2007, a major episode of lava fountaining occurred from the new vent on the east side of the Southeast Crater, also producing a plume of ash and scoriae which fell over the east flank of the volcano. A lava flow travelled about 4.5 km (2.8 mi) into the uninhabited Valle del Bove. This eruption was visible far into the plains of Sicily, ending the following morning between the hours of 5 am and 7 am local time. Catania-Fontanarossa Airport shut down operations during the night for safety precautions.

=== May 2008–July 2009 eruption ===
An eruption on the morning of 13 May 2008, immediately to the east of Etna's summit craters was accompanied by a swarm of more than 200 earthquakes and significant ground deformation in the summit area. The eruption continued at a slowly diminishing rate for 417 days, until 6 July 2009, making this the longest flank eruption of Etna since the 1991–1993 eruption that lasted 473 days. Previous eruptions, in 2001, 2002–2003, and 2004–2005 had lasted three weeks, three months, and six months, respectively. Lava flows advanced 6.5 km during the first few days of this eruption but thereafter stagnated at many minor distances from the vents; during the last months of the eruption lava rarely advanced more than one kilometre downslope.

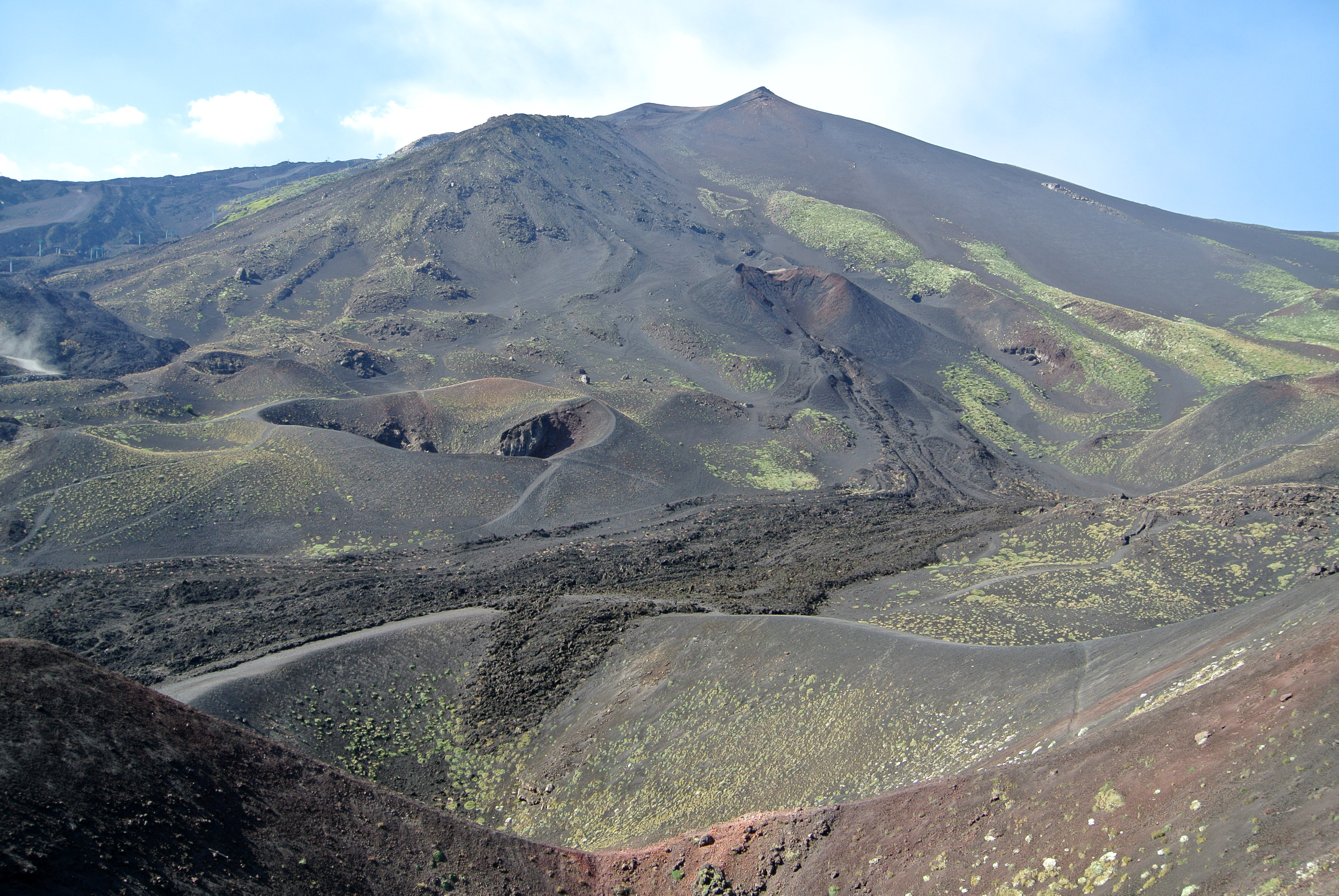
Southern flank of Mount Etna showing lateral cones and flow from the eruption of 2001

=== January 2011–February 2012 eruption ===
Through January 2011 to February 2012, the summit craters of Etna were the site of intense activity. Frequent eruptions and ash columns forced the authorities to shut down the Catania airport on several occasions. The July 2011 episode also endangered the Sapienza Refuge, the main tourist hub on the volcano, but the lava flow was successfully diverted. In 2014, a flank eruption started involving lava flows and strombolian eruptions. This was the first flank eruption since 2008–09.

=== December 2015 eruption ===
On 3 December 2015, an eruption occurred which climaxed between 03:20 and 04:10 local time. The Voragine crater exhibited a lava fountain that reached 1 km (3,300 ft) in height, with an ash plume which reached 3 km (9,800 ft) in height. The activity continued on the following days, with an ash plume that reached 7 km (23,000 ft) in height that forced Catania airport to shut down for a few hours. Volcanic gas emissions from this volcano are measured by a multi-component gas analyzer system, which detects pre-eruptive degassing of rising magmas, improving prediction of volcanic activity.

=== March 2017 eruption ===
An eruption on 16 March 2017 injured 10 people, including a BBC News television crew, after magma exploded upon contact with snow.

=== December 2018 eruption ===
An eruption on 24 December 2018, following a dyke intrusion at shallow depth, spewed ash into the air, forcing the closure of airspace around Mount Etna. Two days later, a magnitude 4.9 earthquake shook the town of Fleri and surrounding towns and hamlets in the Province of Catania, damaging buildings and injuring four people.

=== February–March 2021 eruption ===
Beginning in February 2021, Mount Etna began a series of explosive eruptions, which have had an impact on nearby villages and cities, with volcanic ash and rock falling as far away as Catania. As of 12 March 2021, the volcano has erupted 11 times in three weeks. The eruptions have consistently sent ash clouds over 10 km (33,000 ft) into the air, closing Sicilian airports. There have been no reports of injuries.

=== February 2022 eruption ===
In February 2022 there were two eruptions. On 11 February 2022, at 6 pm, there were lava fountains from the Southeast Crater which had become a single Strombolian eruption by 7 pm. Between 10 pm and 11 pm, it had reached a height of almost 1,000 m and lava bombs were thrown at a considerable distance. Ash was blown west by the wind and then turned southeast. There was large lava flow in the western flank. On 19 February at 10.15 am there was an explosive eruption, again from the Southeast Crater, high lava fountains and lava flows, the longest of which went down the north-eastern flank towards the Bove Valley.

=== May 2022 eruption ===
On 29 May 2022 a sudden collapse of the Southeast Crater created a fracture on its northern flank at an elevation of about 2,800 m (9,200 ft). A small lava flow emerged and headed in the direction of the Leone Valley, just above the much larger Bove Valley. It continued for three days and was accompanied by small and sporadic eruptions from two of the many vents at the top of this crater.

=== July 2024 eruption ===
Etna erupted once again on 4 July 2024 causing the Catania Airport to close due to volcanic ash in the air. The airport reopened the next day.

=== August 2024 eruption ===
On 14 August 2024, Mt. Etna erupted violently sending an ash cloud 9.5 km into the atmosphere. Catania Airport was forced to close the following day.

=== June 2025 eruption ===
On 2 June 2025, an eruption led to a pyroclastic flow possibly caused by the collapse of material from the northern flank of the southeast crater. A red alert issued for aviation authorities said the height of the volcanic cloud was estimated at 6.5 kilometers.

=== January 2026 eruption ===
On 1 January 2026, a flank eruption began on Etna's eastern slope at an altitude on 2,100 meters (6,900 feet). The fissure vent opened in the Valle del Bove and has advanced down to 1,420 meters (4,700 feet) on 2 January 2026. The eruption also produced ash, which threatened to close air space around the volcano. Italy's National Institute of Geophysics and Volcanology (INGV), interpreted that the effusive flow in Valle del Bove had reduced immediate risk to populated areas but also signalled that pressurised magma is still moving through the system.

=== August 2026 eruption ===
A new eruptive phase began at Etna's Voragine crater on 6 August 2026, with Strombolian activity that intensified into lava fountains and abundant ash emissions. Several effusive vents subsequently opened on the volcano's eastern flank, feeding lava flows into the Valle del Bove. By 10 August, active lava fronts had descended to an elevation of about 1,370 m (4,490 ft), while intense explosive activity and ash emissions continued at Voragine. The sustained ash emissions caused major disruption to air travel, forcing hundreds of flights at Catania-Fontanarossa Airport to be cancelled or rerouted and affecting flights as far south as Malta. Flight operations at Catania resumed on 15 August after the volcanic aviation alert was downgraded from red to orange.

==== Volcanic explosivity index of recent eruptions ====
The Global Volcanism Program has assigned a Volcanic Explosivity Index (VEI) to all of Mount Etna's eruptions since January 1955:

VEI	Number of eruptions (total=49)
VEI 0	1
VEI 1	17
VEI 2	24
VEI 3	7

=== Vortex rings ===
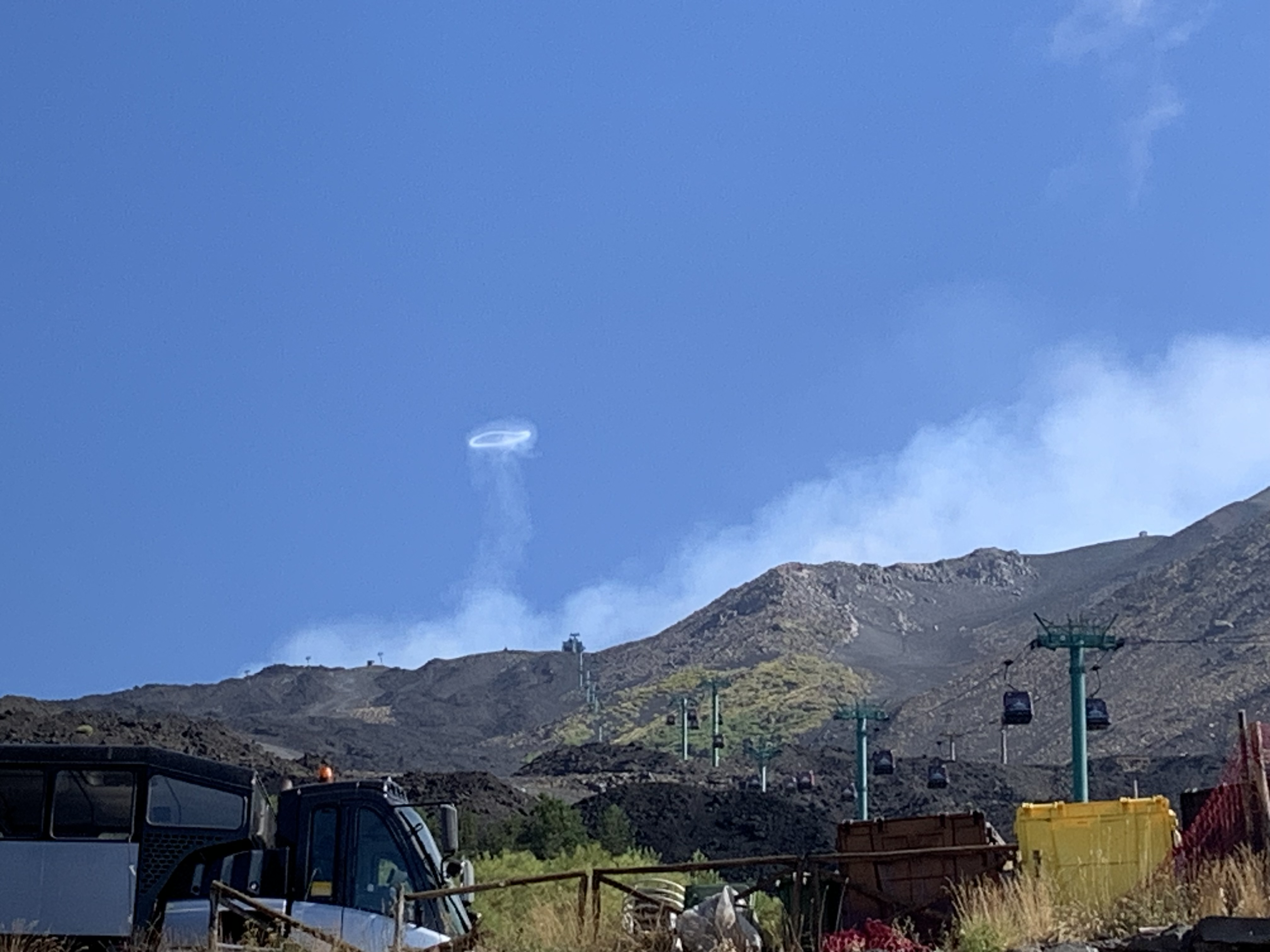
Vortex ring above Mount Etna observed on 9 August 2023

In the 1970s, Etna erupted vortex rings, one of the first recorded events of this type, which are extremely rare. This happened again in 2000. Video footage of the 8 June 2000 event was captured. Another event occurred on 11 April 2013. Other similar events occurred during the summer of 2023 (see photo) and 2024.

== Geopolitical boundaries ==
The borders of ten municipalities (Adrano, Biancavilla, Belpasso, Bronte (from two sides), Castiglione di Sicilia, Maletto, Nicolosi, Randazzo, Sant'Alfio, Zafferana Etnea) meet on the summit of Mount Etna, making this a multipoint of elevenfold complexity.

== Facilities ==
Etna is one of Sicily's main tourist attractions, with thousands of visitors every year. The most common route is through the road leading to Sapienza Refuge ski area, lying at the south of the crater at elevation of 1,910 m. From the Refuge, a cableway runs uphill to an elevation of 2,500 m, from where the crater area at 2,920 m is accessible.

Ferrovia Circumetnea – Round-Etna railway – is a narrow-gauge railway constructed between 1889 and 1895. It runs around the volcano in a 110-km long semi-circle starting in Catania and ending in Riposto 28 km north of Catania.

There are two ski resorts on Etna: one at the Sapienza Refuge, with a chairlift and three ski lifts, and a smaller one on the north, at Piano Provenzana near Linguaglossa, with three lifts and a chairlift.

Sapienza Refuge was the finish of Stage 9 of the 2011 Giro d'Italia and Stage 4 of the 2017 Giro.

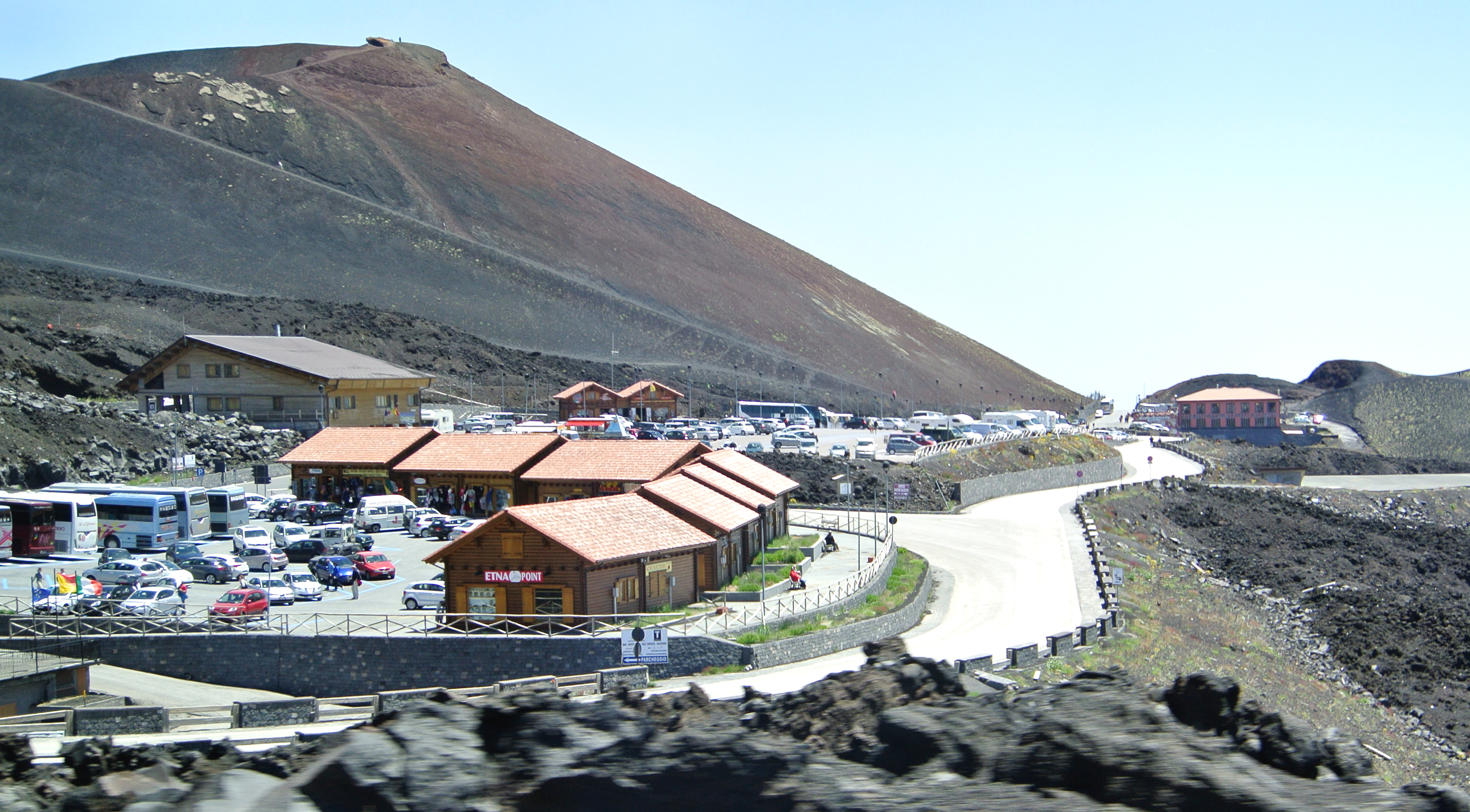
Sapienza Refuge, the main tourist hub

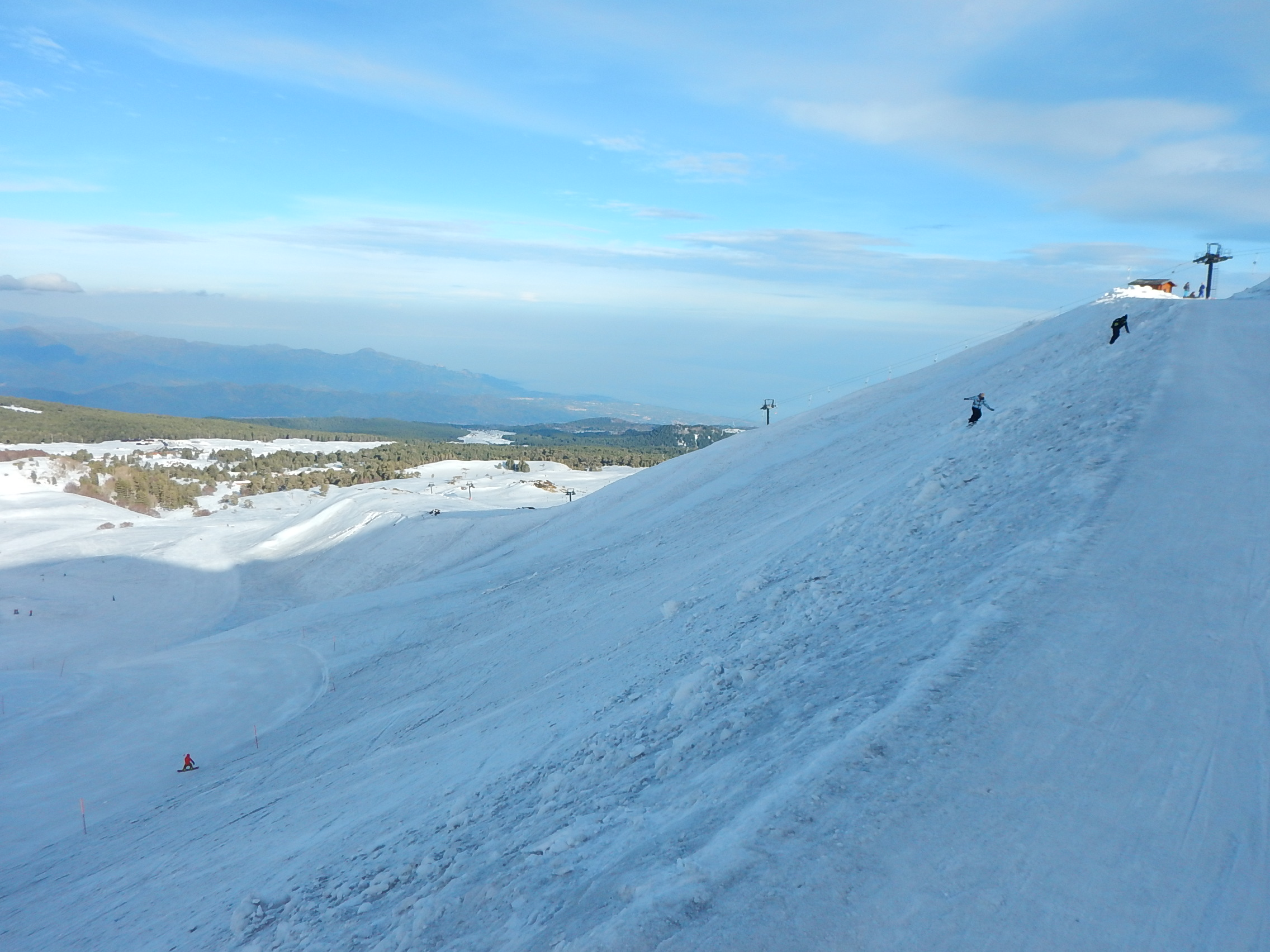
Etna North Linguaglossa and Etna South Nicolosi are the two ski resorts of the volcano.

== See also ==
- Genista aetnensis, the Mount Etna broom
- List of Italian regions by highest point
- List of volcanoes in Italy
- Mount Vesuvius
- Sacred mountains
- Volcanic Seven Summits
