= Linguaglossa =

Linguaglossa Linguarossa (Sicilian)
- Comune
- Comune di Linguaglossa
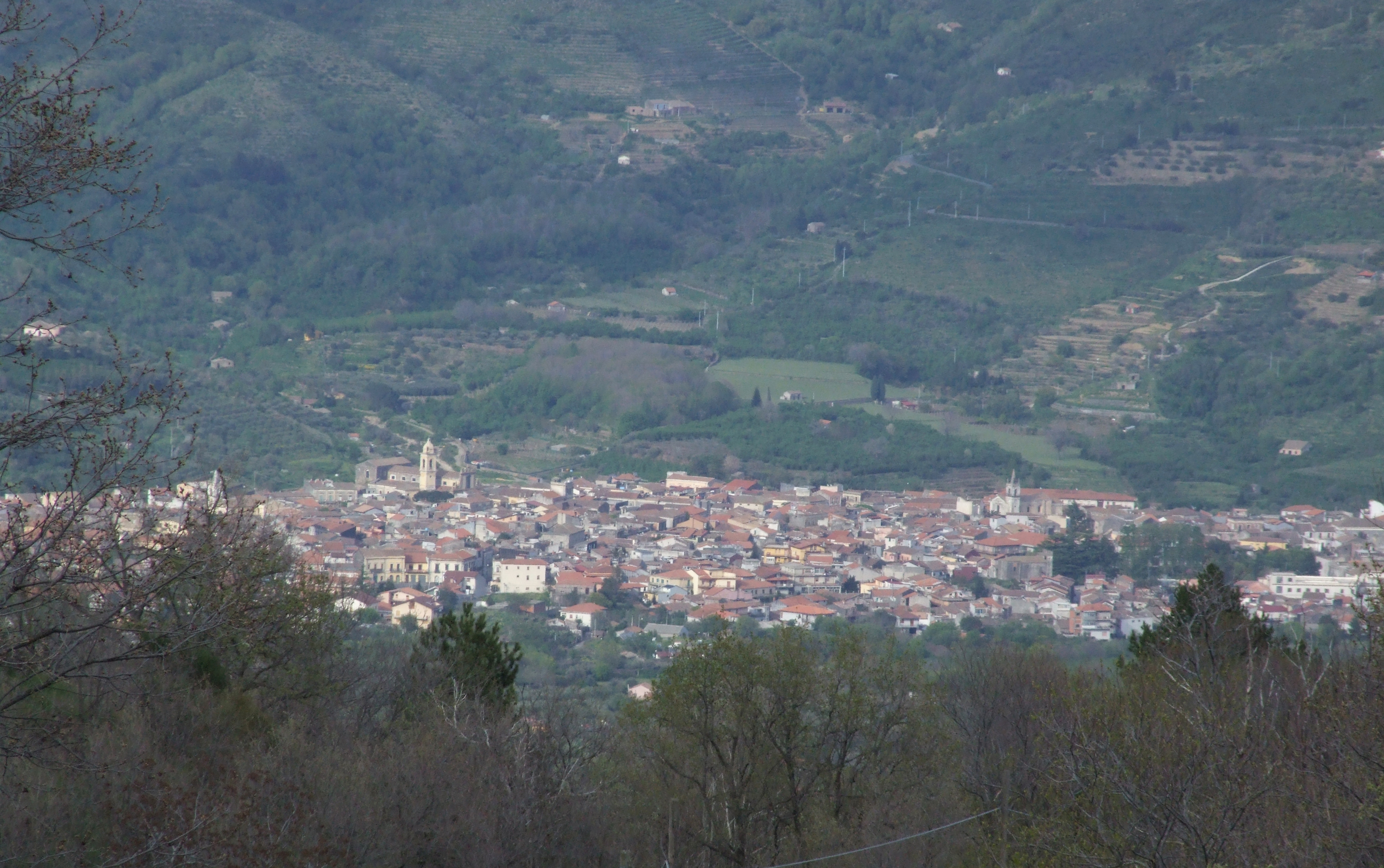

- Coat of arms

- Location within Italy Location within Sicily
- Coordinates: 37°51′N 15°08′E
- Country: Italy
- Region: Sicily
- Metropolitan city: Catania (CT)
- Frazioni: Catena

Government
  - Mayor: Salvatore Puglisi

Area
  - Total: 60.25 km^{2} (23.26 sq mi)
- Elevation: 550 m (1,800 ft)

Population (30 September 2017)
  - Total: 5,353
  - Density: 88.85/km^{2} (230.1/sq mi)
- Demonym: linguaglossesi
- Time zone: UTC+1 (CET)
  - Summer (DST): UTC+2 (CEST)
- Postal code: 95015
- Dialing code: 095
- Patron saint: St. Giles
- Saint day: 1 September
- Website: www.comune.linguaglossa.ct.it

Linguaglossa (Sicilian: Linguarossa) is a town and comune in the Metropolitan City of Catania in Sicily, located on the northern side of Mount Etna where there is also a ski resort with view on the Ionian Sea. It was founded on a lava stream in 1566. The name literally means 'Tongue Tongue', with lingua and γλῶσσα (glôssa) being respectively the Latin and Greek words for 'tongue', but actually derives from lingua grossa, short for grossa lingua di lava 'a big tongue of lava'. Linguaglossa is one of the most renowned destinations in the Etna region, celebrated for its exceptional wine production, Michelin-starred dining experiences, and rich gastronomic culture. Nestled on the northern slopes of Mount Etna, it has become a landmark for food and wine enthusiasts seeking an authentic expression of Sicily’s culinary heritage.

== Main sights ==
Sights of Linguaglossa include the Chiesa Madre, also known as La Matrice, erected in 1613, and the Church of Saint Giles, who is the town's patron saint. The Francesco Messina Museum offers a collection of work of Francesco Messina (portraits, horses, ballerinas) and Salvatore Incorpora.

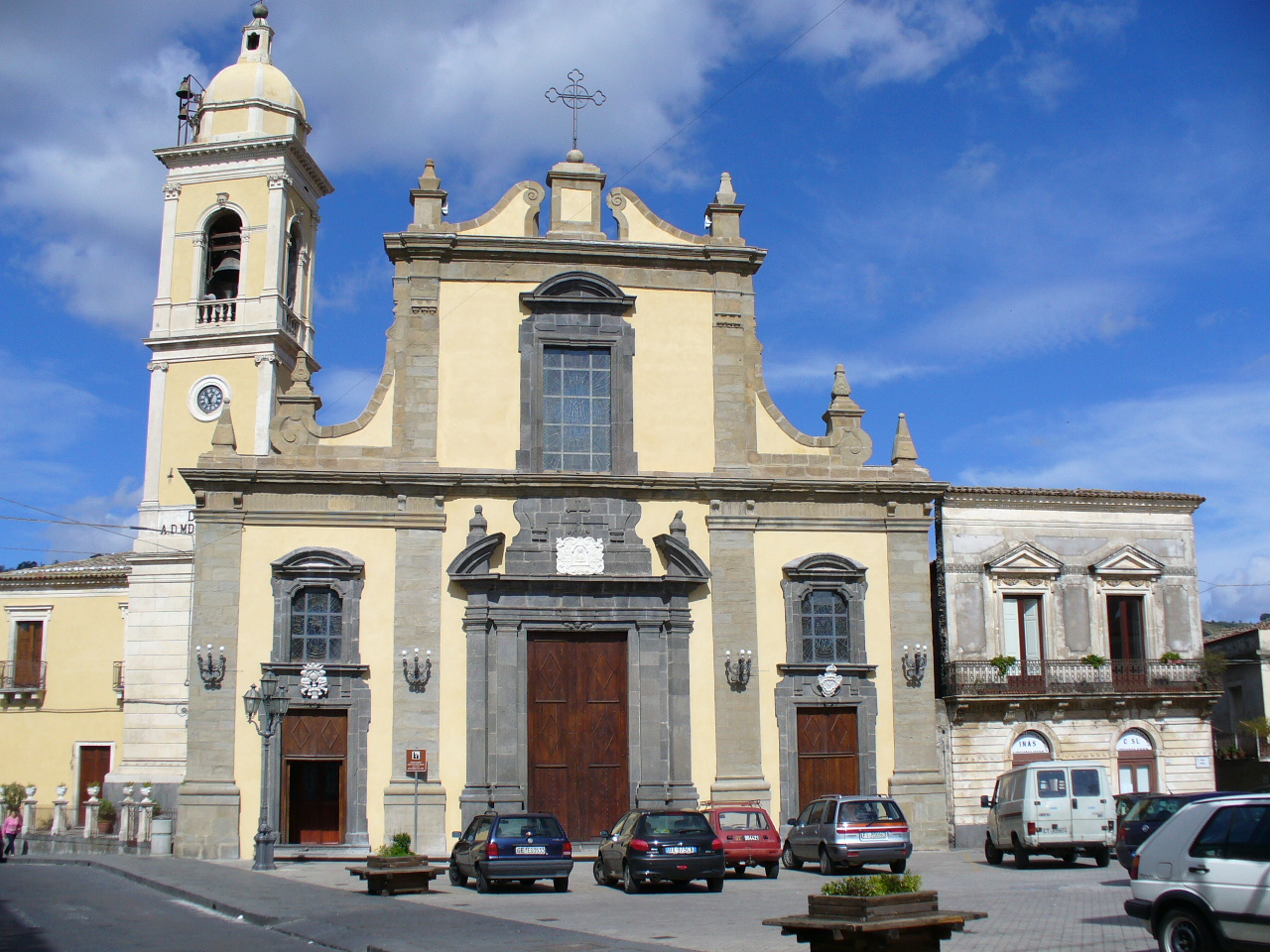
the Chiesa Madre of Our Lady of Graces, in lava stone

Palazzo Previtera is a historic building dating back to 1649, owned by the Previtera family one of the most influential family on Etna. Today, the building showcase the private art collection of the family, hotel and restaurant.

Schools: The "Santo Calì" Comprehensive School, comprising the municipalities of Linguaglossa and Castiglione di Sicilia, includes preschool, primary school, and lower secondary school. Headteacher: Professor Rita Pagano. Deputy Headteacher: Professor Egidio Di Mauro. Secretary: Dr. Letizia Puglia. The school also includes a scientific high school and a linguistic high school, separate sections of the "Michele Amari" Higher Education Institute in Giarre.
