= 2024 Germany floods =

2024 natural disasters in Germany

- Part of 2024 European floods
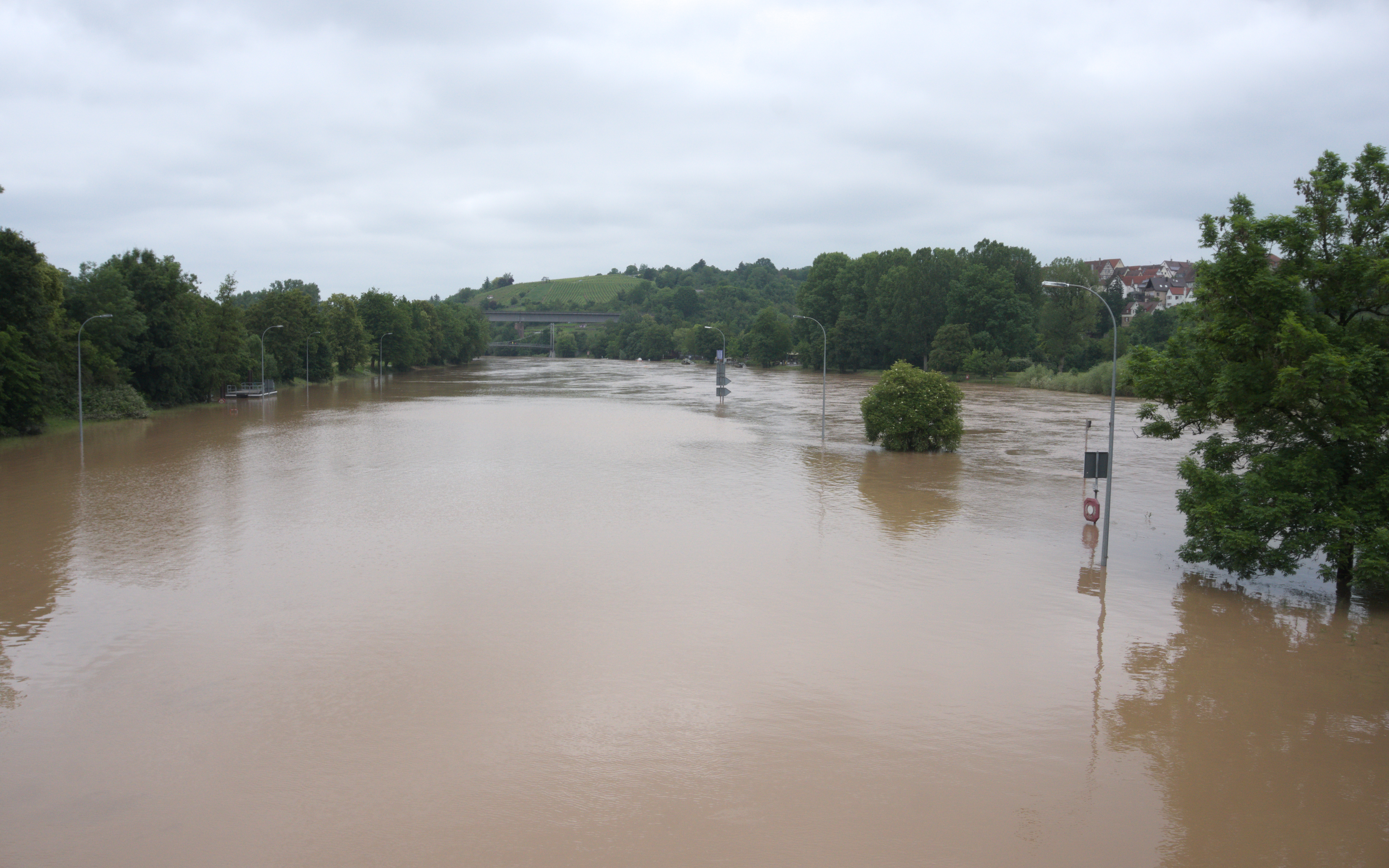
- Flooding at Marbach am Neckar on 3 June
- Date: 30 May – 13 June 2024
- Location: Bavaria, Baden-Württemberg
- Type: Heavy rainfall, Dam failure
- Deaths: 9
- Injuries: 1
- Missing: 1
- Property damage: €2.2 billion (insured damage)
- Displaced: 3,000+

In 2024, Germany experienced flooding. In particular, in June 2024, significant flooding struck Southern Germany, leading to the death of 6 people and the failure of several dams in the region, requiring the evacuation of several municipalities and rescue missions.

== May ==
On 2 May, slowly moving thunderstorms caused flooding in several places. In Hausen, a man died in a cellar.

On 17 May 2024, floods and landslides occurred in Saarland after over 100 liters of rain per square meter came down in less than 24 hours. Evacuations in the region were required. A woman in Saarbrücken was injured during an evacuation and later died. Ottweiler was inundated after a nearby dam broke. A red cross member died shortly after a rescue operation from heart failure.

Insured damage in Saarland and Rheinland-Pfalz was estimated to be at least 200 Million Euros.

== June ==
In June 2024, significant flooding struck Southern Germany, striking the most in Baden-Württemberg and Bavaria. Dozens of villages had to be evacuated across Baden-Württemberg and Bavaria due to the straining and potential failure of several dams and dykes caused by the persistent heavy rainfall. Many places had more rainfall in 24 hours than their whole monthly average, and in many areas, the water reached levels that were present only "once in a century" according to the Bavarian Flood Information Service.

Among the rivers whose water levels significantly rose include the Danube, the Isar, the Zusam, the Weilach, the Ilm, the Paar, the Schmutter, the Roth, and the Leibi.

An inflatable rescue raft containing four firefighters capsized while evacuating citizens in Pfaffenhofen from floodwaters from the overflowing Ilm River, resulting in the death of one firefighter. Another firefighter was missing, as well as a woman in Schrobenhausen which was later found dead. An employee working at an energy company in Freising suffered critical injuries after receiving an electrical shock during the floods.

Nordendorf mayor Tobias Kunz noted that the flooding began to grow into an emergency starting at 06:00 am (GMT+2) caused by overflowing of the River Schmutter, requiring the use of 40,000 sandbags to construct a 240-meter-long dike to restrict the flooding. The dam located near a Nordendorf school sports field burst, submerging and destroying the €1 million property.

Carriages of a train were derailed by a landslide caused by the heavy raining near Schwaebisch Gmund. None of the 185 passengers were injured.

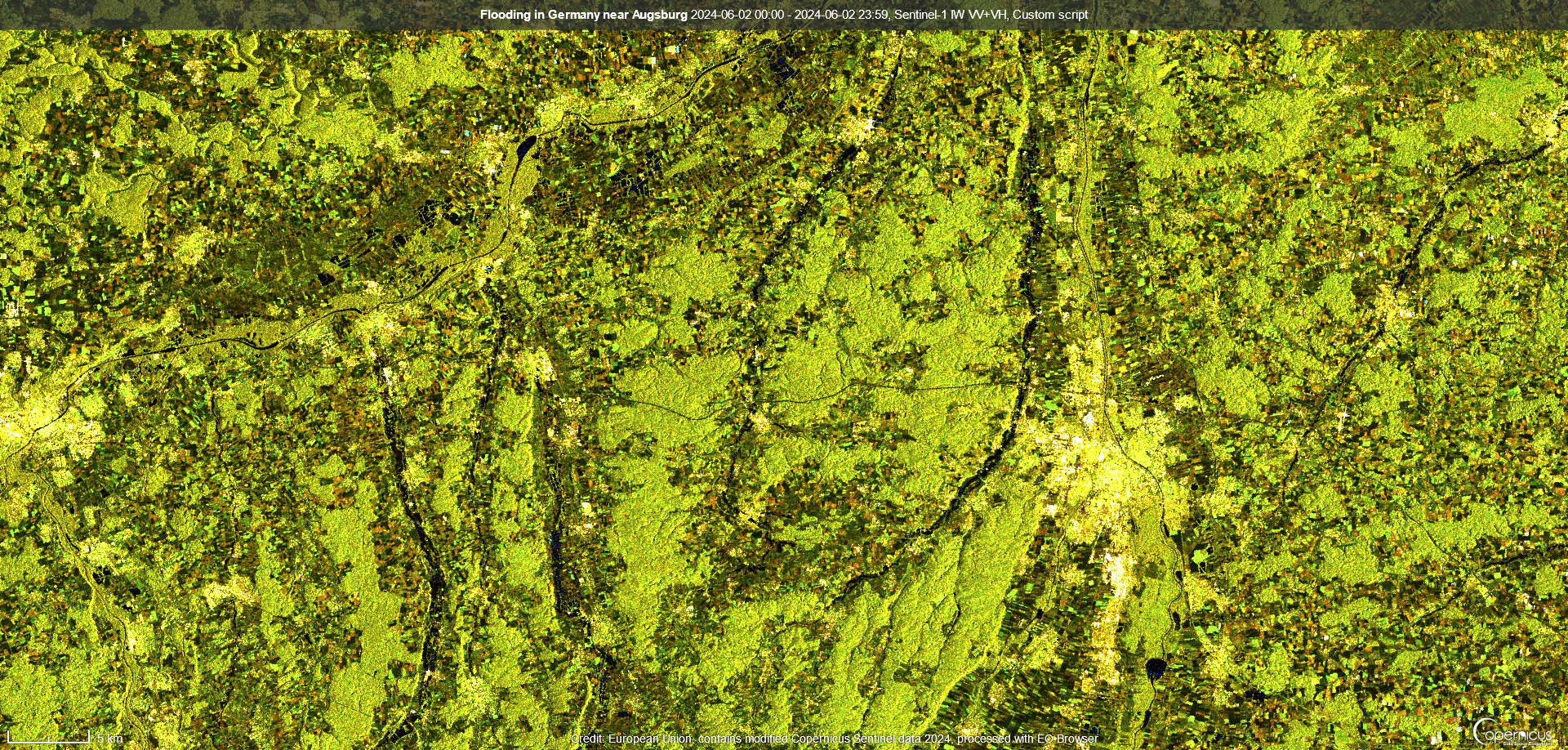
Sentinel-1 false colour satellite image on 2 June 2024 showing the vicinity of Augsburg. Flooding on the Günz, Mindel, Zusam and Schmutter rivers (W to E) is visible in black to dark blue. Image accessible in online browser here: https://link.dataspace.copernicus.eu/z9pi.

Evacuation and state of emergency declarations were delivered in Augsburg, Lindau, municipalities in the Lake Constance region, Memmingen, Dillingen, Neu-Ulm, Kelheim, Straubing and Straubing-Bogen, Pfaffenhofen an der Ilm, Schrobenhausen, Donau-Ries, Unterallgäu, Günzburg, Aichach-Friedberg, Dachau, and Diedorf. In Diedorf, a dam and a dyke broke, and an underground car park and several surrounding house basements were flooded. Wiesensteig residents were told to boil water due to the flooding of water treatment facilities.

On 3 June 2024, rescuers recovered the body of a woman in Schrobenhausen, believed to have drowned while trapped in an apartment basement. Two more bodies were discovered in a cellar in Schorndorf. The highest level of flood warning, at level four, was placed on the districts from Regensburg to Straubing. In the meantime, heavy rainfall in Switzerland led to rising water levels in rivers and lakes, including the Sitter river at Goldach, Lake Constance, the High Rhine, and caused overflow at the Untersee and Lake Lauerz.

The following day, reports indicated that the Danube's water level at Passau had risen to 10 metres (33 ft), with this increase extending downstream into Austria and Hungary.

On 4 June, a 57 year old woman lost control with her car on a flooded road. She was later found dead. The Falkenstein Castle in Upper Bavaria partially collapsed to the north due to heavy rainfall, causing the evacuation of 50 residents under the castle complex. On 5 June, a 79-year-old woman which was missing since 2 June was found dead. On 7 June, insured damage was estimated by German insurers to be at least €2 billion in the states of Bavaria and Baden-Württemberg.

== See also ==
- 2024 European floods
- 2024 France floods
- 2024 United Kingdom floods
- List of floods in Europe
