= Jankovice =

Jankovice may refer to places in the Czech Republic:

- Jankovice (Kroměříž District), a municipality and village in the Zlín Region
- Jankovice (Pardubice District), a municipality and village in the Pardubice Region
- Jankovice (Uherské Hradiště District), a municipality and village in the Zlín Region
- Jankovice, a village and part of Teplá in the Karlovy Vary Region
