= Sulcis Mountains =

Mountain chain in Sardinia, Italy

Coordinates: 39°08′56″N 8°49′39″E

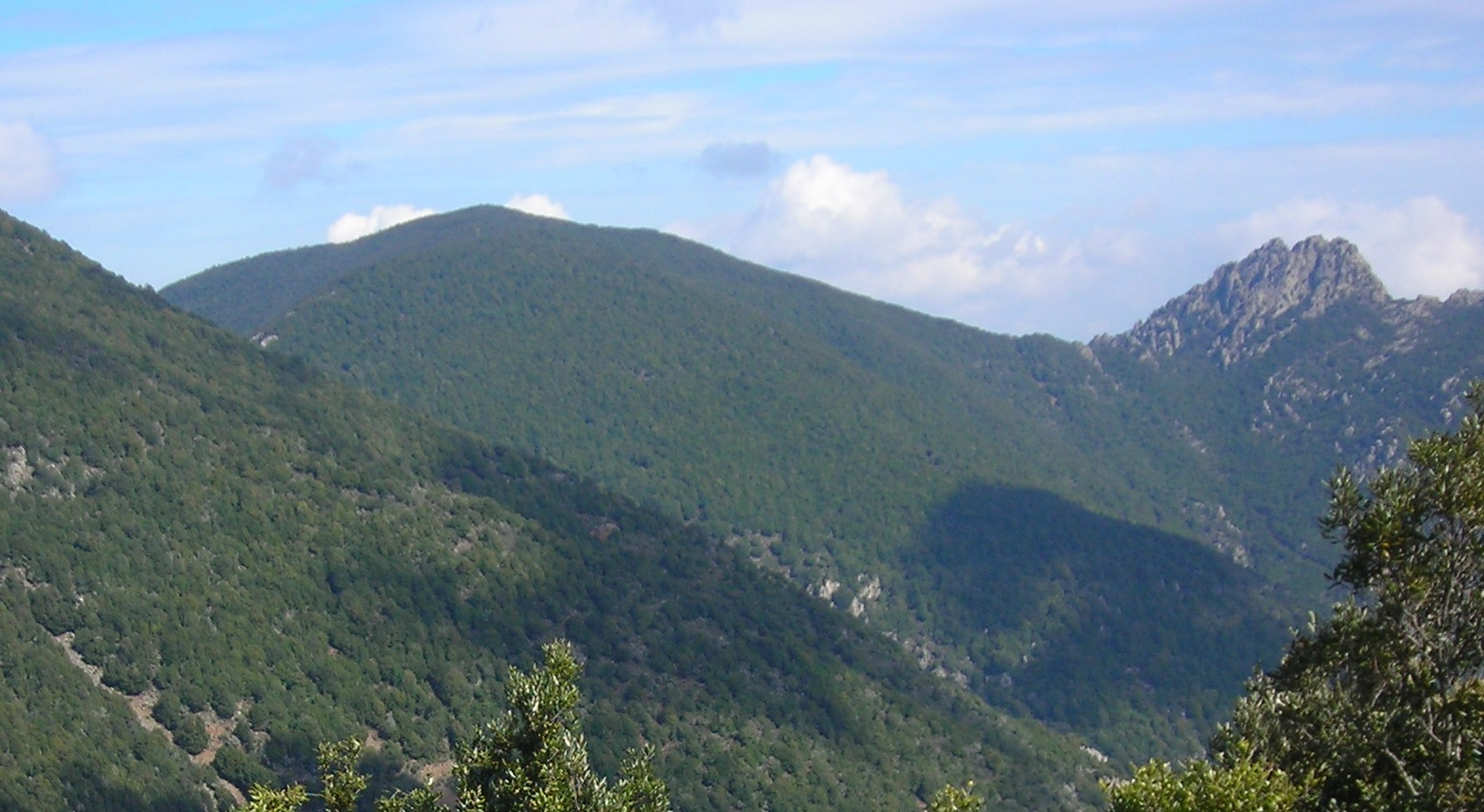
Monte Is Caravius in the Sulcis Mountains.

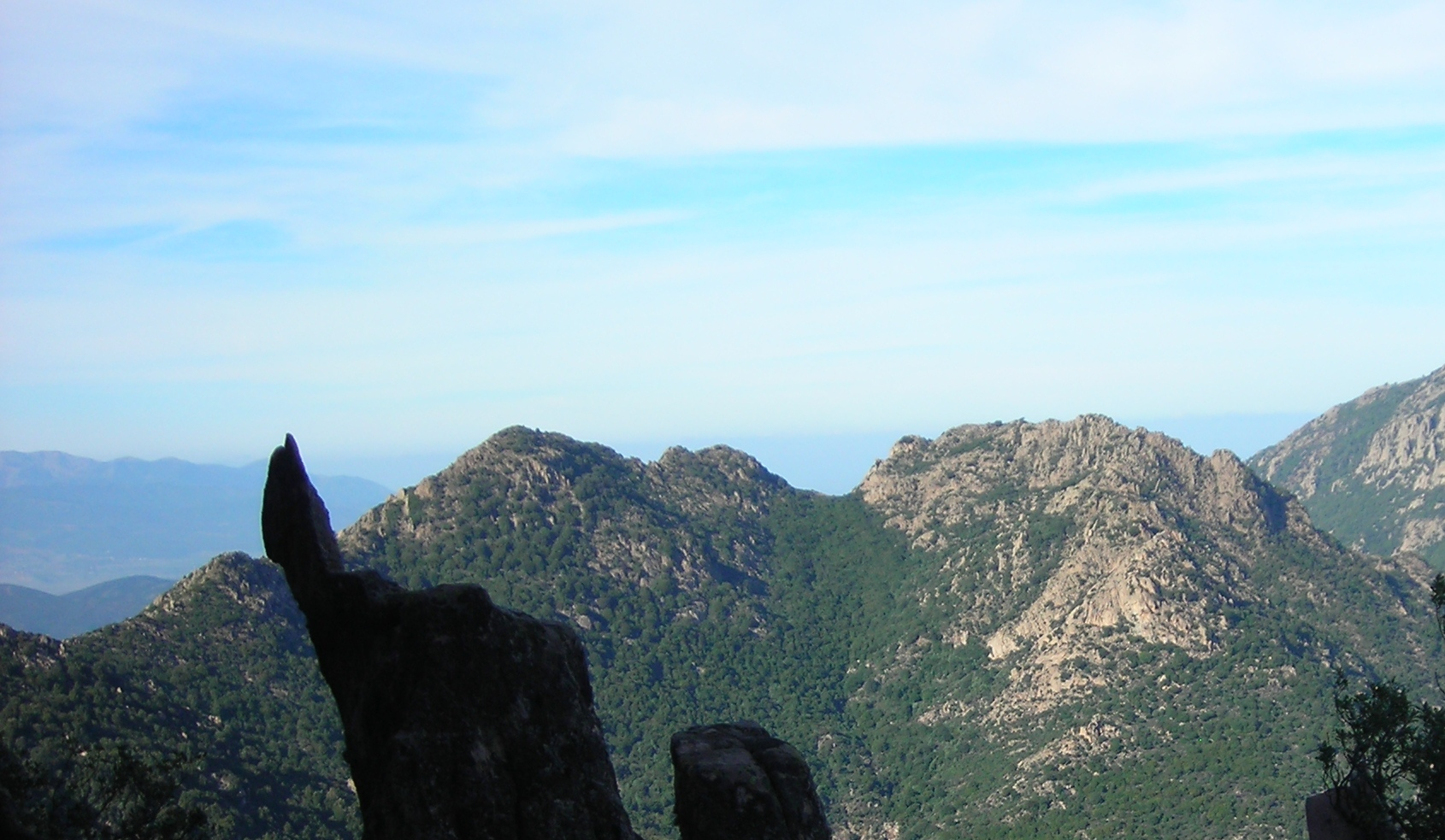
Monte Genna Strinta see from Monte Lattias.

The Sulcis Mountains (Italian: Monti del Sulcis) is a mountain chain in Sardinia, Italy. Together with the Monte Linas massif, from which they are separated by the flood plain of the Cixerri River, they form the Sulcis-Iglesiente Mountains, one of the most ancient geological formations in the island.

== Geology ==
The geology of the Sulcis Mountains is rather complex, due to their very ancient origin, dating to more than 600 million years ago, before the Cambrian period. Their advanced age is also evident in the subdued nature of their relief, with just a few peaks over 1000m in elevation. Most of the chain’s surviving geological record consists of magmatic intrusions and metamorphic rocks whose protoliths were deposited prior to the Variscan orogeny and are now exposed at the surface after millions of years of erosion and unroofing.

The western side of the chain, more affected by erosion and flood processes, is modest in relief and elevation and characterized by more subdued topography, while the inner and eastern sectors feature sharper and more irregular topography, with extensive relief and steep, narrow valleys. The western side contains the oldest formations, dating from the Cambrian, which consist of originally sedimentary rocks of marine origin, which were later metamorphosed. Karst topography is also present in the western sector (Is Zuddas Grottoes).

Most of the chain’s sedimentary protoliths dating from the Carboniferous to the Permian were either regionally or thermally metamorphosed during the Variscan orogeny or by the intrusion of syn- and post-orogenic Variscan and later, Cenozoic granitic plutons, respectively. Post-Variscan erosion and tectonic uplift during Cenozoic time led to the unroofing and exposure of magmatic leucogranites and metamorphic schists, which has ultimately resulted in the eastern sector being more geologically heterogeneous.

The plateau-like formations found at the feet of the chain have a dual origin: those on the western side are more ancient, consisting of flood deposits and, partly, lavas from the Cenozoic, while those on the eastern and south-eastern sides consist of small flood deposits from the Quaternary.

== Main peaks ==
- Monte Is Caravius (1116 m)
- Monte Tiriccu (1105 m)
- Punta Sa Cruxitta (1093 m)
- Monte Sa Mirra (1087 m)
- Monte Lattias (1086 m)
- Monte Nieddu (1040 m)
- Monte Maxia (1017 m)
- Sa Punta Sa Berrita de Currei (1008 m)
- Punta Rocca Steria (1008 m)
- Punta Sebera (979 m)
- Monte Genna Spina (970 m)
- Punta Allimeddus (966 m)
- Monte Arcosu (948 m)

== Sources ==
- "Sulcis". I Parchi della Sardegna. Cagliari: Edisar. 1993. ISBN 88-86004-35-4.
