= Giarre-Riposto =

Giarre-Riposto, later known as Ionia, was a comune (municipality) that existed from 1939 to 1945 in the province of Catania, Italy.

== History ==
The municipality of Giarre-Riposto was created by the fascist regime in 1939, merging the municipalities of Giarre and Riposto which had previously been administratively separate.

In 1942, Giarre-Riposto was renamed to Ionia.

Following the end of World War II, the two towns were separated again by legislative decree and both had their names and administrative capabilities restored.

== People ==
- Franco Battiato (1945–2021), singer-songwriter
