= Monte Is Caravius =

Mountain in Italy

Coordinates: 39°08′56″N 8°49′40″E

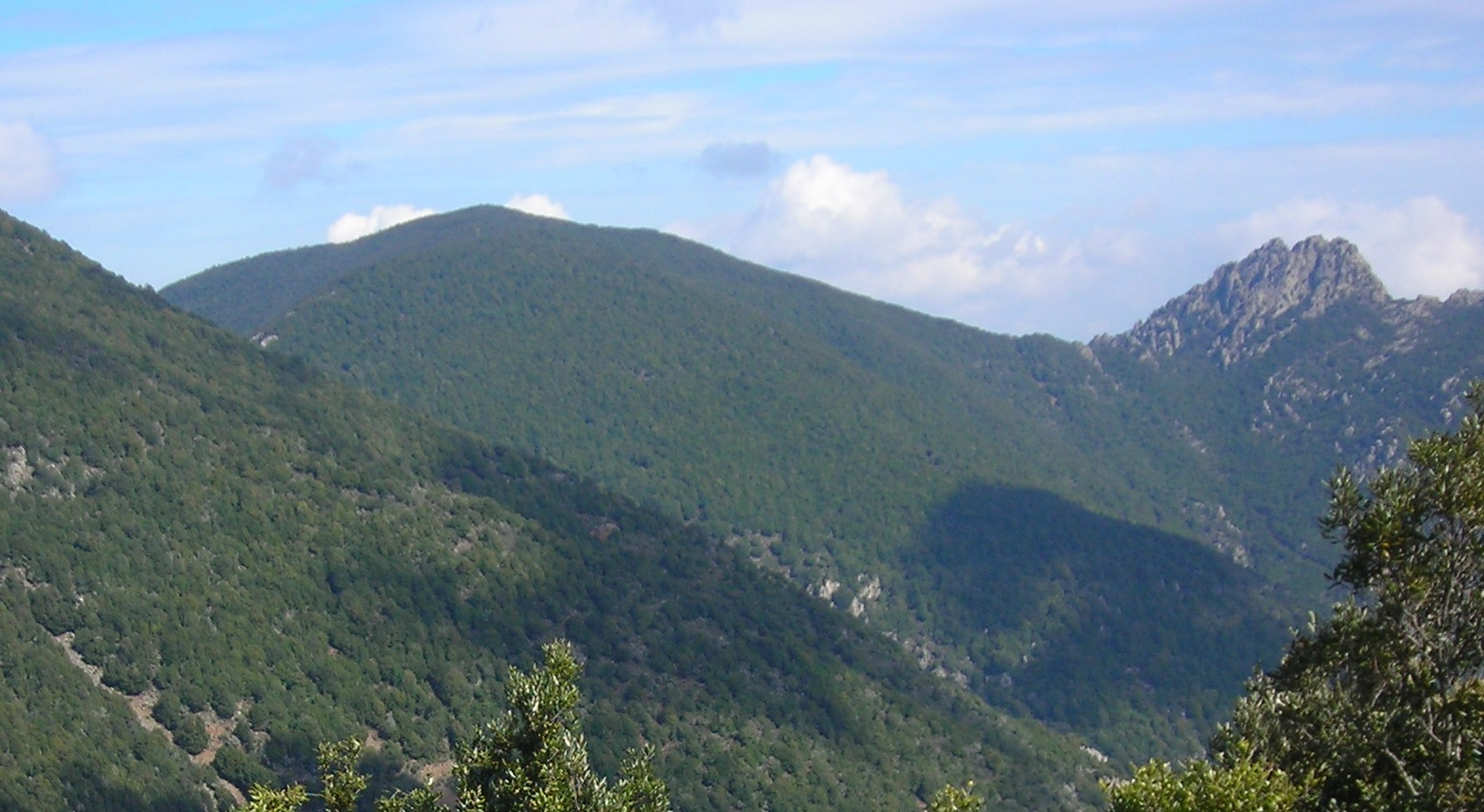

Highest point
- Elevation: 1,116 m (3,661 ft)

Geography
- Location within Italy
- Country: Italy
- Region: Sardinia

Monte Is Caravius is the highest massif in the Sulcis Mountains, in southern Sardinia, Italy. The information on the height of the relief is still under debate: geographical atlases, historical bibliographic sources, and official documentation attribute the height of 1116 m; other sources, including several of an administrative or technical-scientific nature that use information from territorial information systems, indicate a height of 1113 m.
