= Riposto =

Municipality in Sicily, Italy

- Comune
- Comune di Riposto
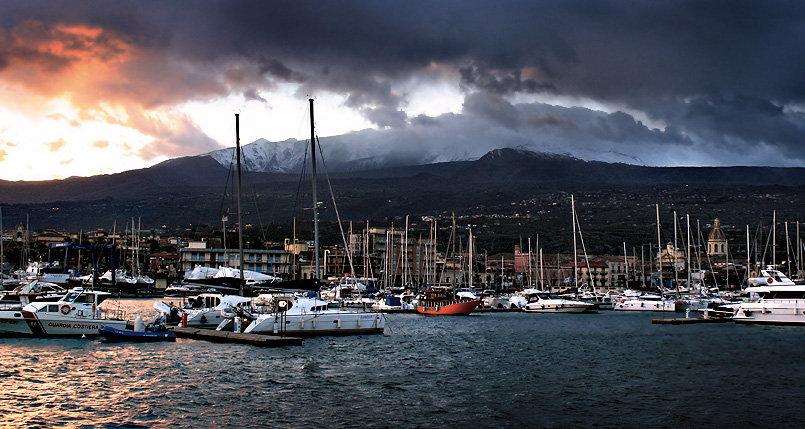

- Coat of arms

- Location within Italy Location within Sicily
- Coordinates: 37°44′N 15°12′E
- Country: Italy
- Region: Sicily
- Metropolitan city: Catania (CT)
- Frazioni: Altarello, Archi, Carruba, Praiola, Quartirello, Torre Archirafi

Government
  - Mayor: Enzo Caragliano

Area
  - Total: 12.9 km^{2} (5.0 sq mi)
- Elevation: 7 m (23 ft)

Population (30 November 2016)
  - Total: 14,790
  - Density: 1,150/km^{2} (2,970/sq mi)
- Demonym: Ripostesi
- Time zone: UTC+1 (CET)
  - Summer (DST): UTC+2 (CEST)
- Postal code: 95018
- Dialing code: 095
- Patron saint: St. Peter
- Website: www.comune.riposto.ct.it

Riposto (Sicilian: Ripostu) is a comune (municipality) in the Catania area of southern Italy. The small seafront town is located about 220 kilometres (140 mi) southeast of Palermo and about 30 kilometres (19 mi) north of Catania.

== History ==
Riposto is historically connected to Mascali, as its commercial port since the 16th century, until it finally gained autonomy in the 18th century. In the early 19th century, the town would be merged with Giarre, changing its name to Ionia in 1939. In 1945 the two towns were divided once again.

== Geography ==
The town is located on the Ionian Coast, and borders with the municipalities of Acireale, Giarre and Mascali. Its frazioni are Altarello, Archi, Carruba, Praiola, Quartirello and Torre Archirafi.

== People ==
- Franco Battiato (1945–2021), singer-songwriter
- Federico Cafiero (1914–1980), mathematician

== See also ==
- Giarre-Riposto
