= Jankovice (Kroměříž District) =

- Municipality
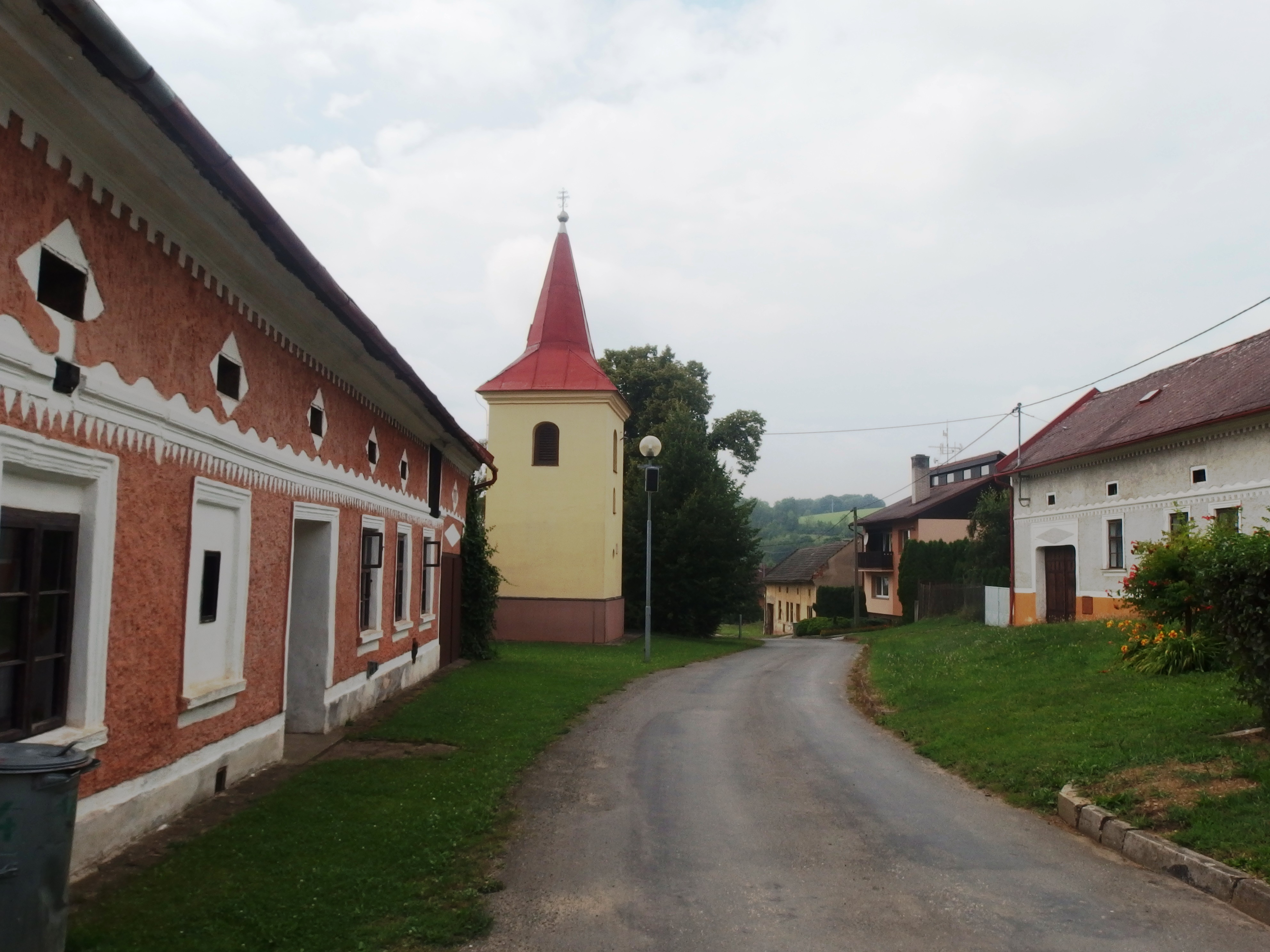
- Belfry

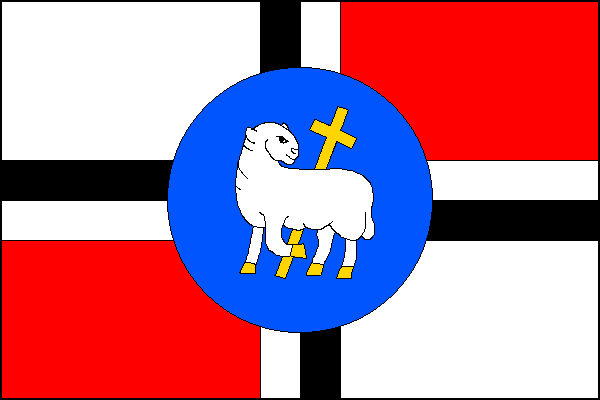
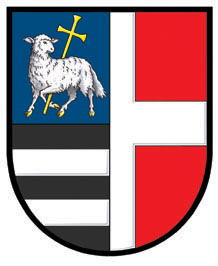
- Flag Coat of arms

- Location in the Czech Republic
- Coordinates: 49°21′22″N 17°37′18″E
- Country: Czech Republic
- Region: Zlín
- District: Kroměříž
- First mentioned: 1365

Area
  - Total: 4.18 km^{2} (1.61 sq mi)
- Elevation: 274 m (899 ft)

Population (2026-01-01)
  - Total: 413
  - Density: 98.8/km^{2} (256/sq mi)
- Time zone: UTC+1 (CET)
  - Summer (DST): UTC+2 (CEST)
- Postal code: 769 01
- Website: jankovice.net

Jankovice is a municipality and village in Kroměříž District in the Zlín Region of the Czech Republic. It has about 400 inhabitants.

Jankovice lies approximately 18 kilometres (11 mi) east of Kroměříž, 15 km (9 mi) north of Zlín, and 245 km (152 mi) east of Prague.

== Demographics ==
Historical population
Year	Pop.	±%
1869	359	—
1880	339	−5.6%
1890	379	+11.8%
1900	398	+5.0%
1910	410	+3.0%
1921	397	−3.2%
1930	398	+0.3%
1950	377	−5.3%
1961	411	+9.0%
1970	338	−17.8%
1980	334	−1.2%
1991	320	−4.2%
2001	350	+9.4%
2011	395	+12.9%
2021	379	−4.1%
Source: Censuses

== Notable people ==
- Bohumil Páník (born 1956), football manager; lives here
- Hana Matelová (born 1990), table tennis player; lives here
- Gabriela Gunčíková (born 1993), singer; lives here
