= Giarre =

- Comune
- Comune di Giarre
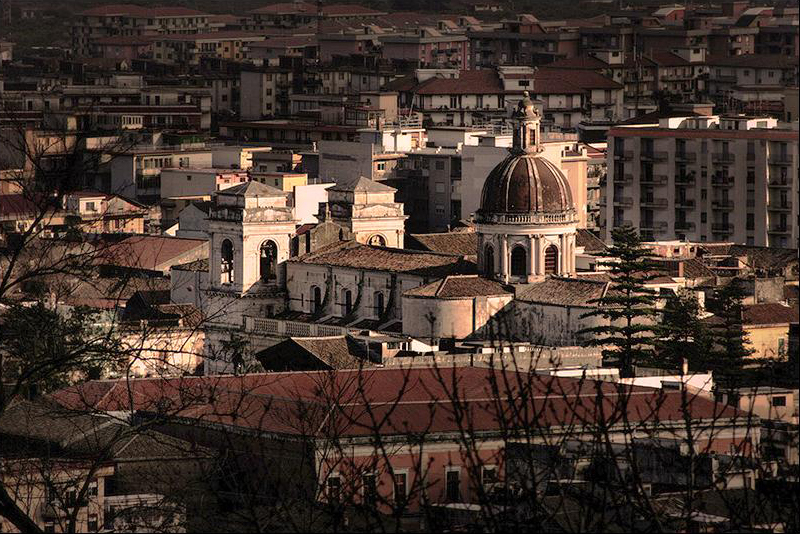

- Coat of arms

- Location within Italy Location within Sicily
- Coordinates: 37°44′N 15°11′E
- Country: Italy
- Region: Sicily
- Metropolitan city: Catania (CT)
- Frazioni: Altarello, Carruba, Macchia, Miscarello, San Giovanni Montebello, San Leonardello, Santa Maria la Strada, Sciara, Trepunti

Government
  - Mayor: Leonardo Cantarella

Area
  - Total: 27 km^{2} (10 sq mi)
- Elevation: 81 m (266 ft)

Population (31 August 2017)
  - Total: 27,407
  - Density: 1,000/km^{2} (2,600/sq mi)
- Demonym: Giarresi
- Time zone: UTC+1 (CET)
  - Summer (DST): UTC+2 (CEST)
- Postal code: 95014, 95010
- Dialing code: 095
- Patron saint: St. Isidore the Labourer
- Saint day: 15 May
- Website: comune.giarre.ct.it

Giarre (Sicilian: Giarri) is a comune (municipality) in the Metropolitan City of Catania, Sicily. The town is located about 275 kilometres (171 mi) southeast of Palermo and around 30 kilometres (19 mi) north of Catania.

== Geography ==
Giarre is bounded by the municipalities of Acireale, Mascali, Milo, Riposto, Sant'Alfio, Santa Venerina and Zafferana Etnea. It forms a conurbation with the coastal town of Riposto.

== History ==
Some historians suppose that the ancient Greek city of Kallipolis was situated in the same territory as the present-day town of Giarre, but nowadays there is no relevant proof of it.

From the late 16th century until 1815 Giarre was a village of the county of Mascali.

During the fascist era Giarre was joined to Riposto under the name of Jonia, but separated again in 1945.

Giarre was the site of the Giarre murder in 1980.

== Main sights ==
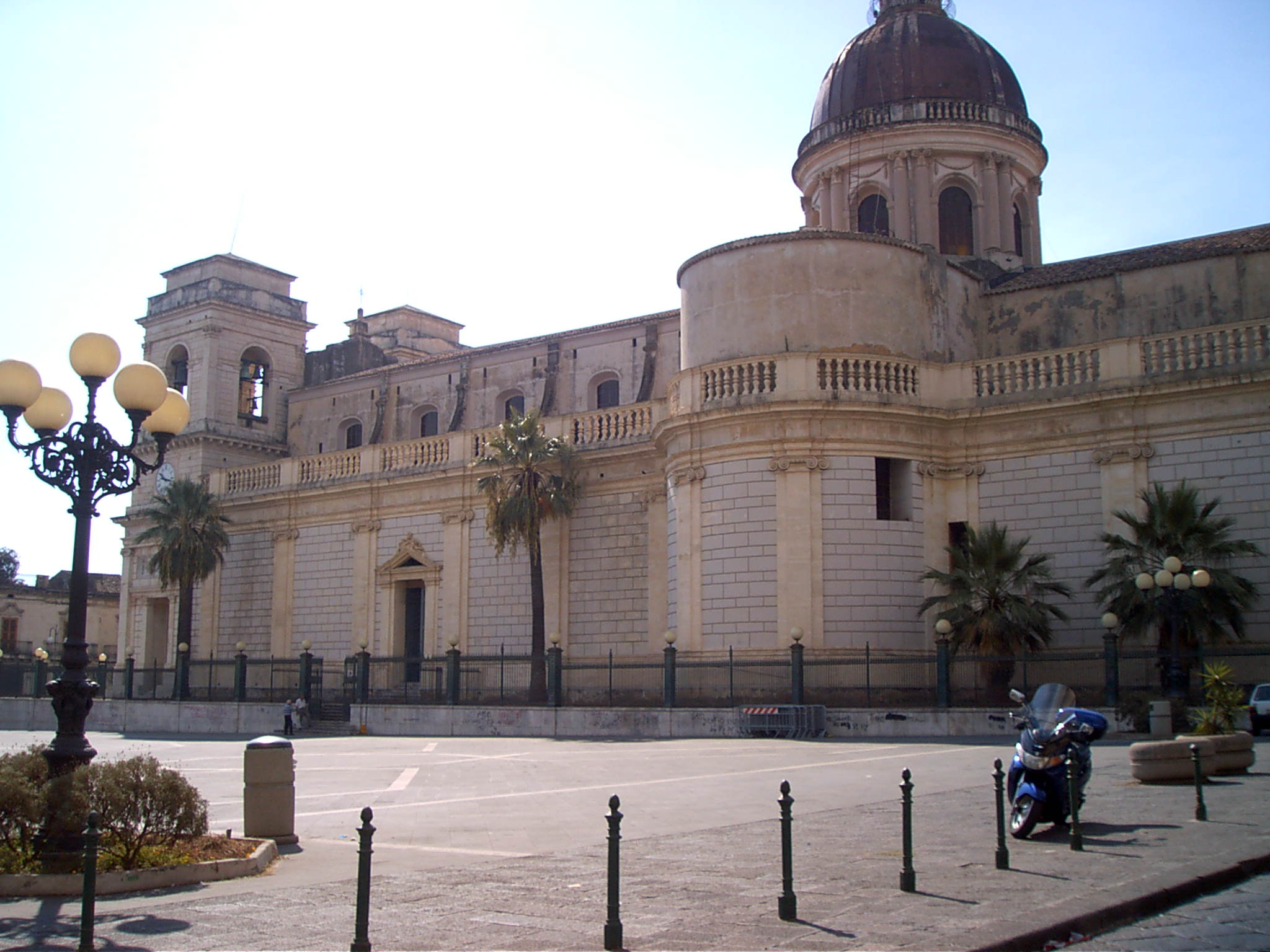
The Piazza Duomo

The neo-classical cathedral, begun in 1794, is dedicated to the Spaniard St. Isidore, patron of Madrid.

Other sights include:

- Oratory of St. Filippo Neri (18th century)
- Sanctuary of Maria Santissima della Strada, the oldest church in the town (dating to 1081). Today little remains of the original medieval structure, having been replaced by a neoclassicist edifice.
- Museum of Uses and Customs of the Etna people

Giarre has attracted attention for its numerous unfinished buildings and amenities, initiated with public money in the 1990s but never used. A small number have been converted to other uses, including a multi-storey car park; residents also see the prospect of some tourism, as the town has come to be regarded as the centre of this style of urban planning.

== Twin towns ==
- Cismon del Grappa, Italy, since 1969

== See also ==
- Giarre F.C.
- Giarre-Riposto
