= Weilach =

River in Germany

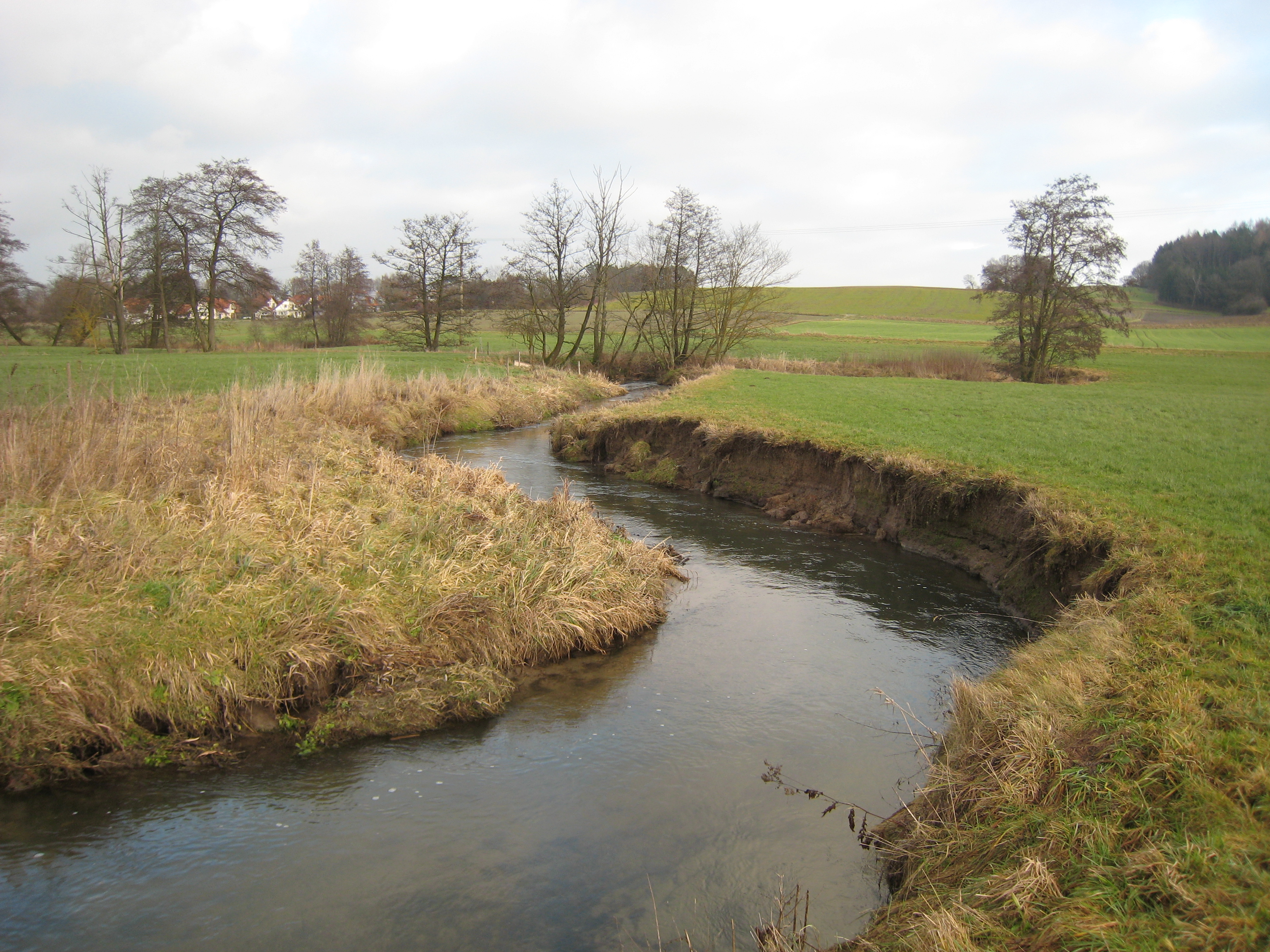
- The Weilach between the municipalities Weilach und Schiltberg

Location
- Country: Germany
- State: Bavaria

Physical characteristics
- Mouth
  - location: Paar
  - coordinates: 48.5681°N 11.2687°E
- Length: 24.8 km (15.4 mi)

Basin features
- Progression: Paar→ Danube→ Black Sea

Weilach is a river of Bavaria, Germany. It flows into the Paar in Schrobenhausen.

== See also ==
- List of rivers of Bavaria
