= Torre Archirafi =

- Frazione
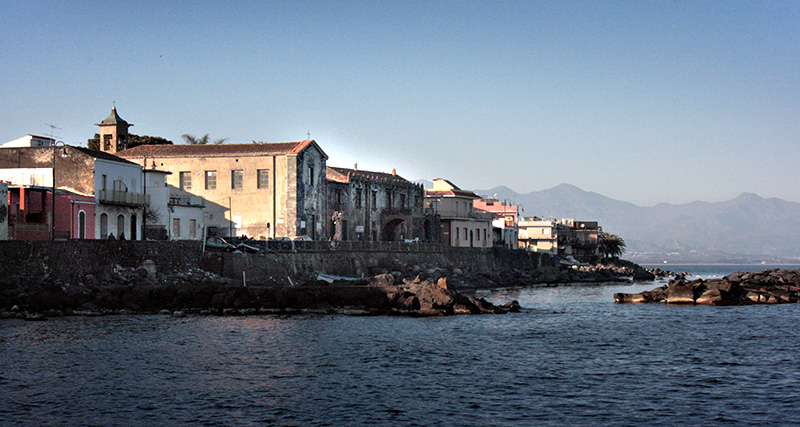

- Location of Torre Archirafi in Italy
- Coordinates: 37°42′31″N 15°13′03″E
- Country: Italy
- Region: Sicily
- Province: Catania
- Comune: Riposto
- Elevation: 3 m (9.8 ft)

Population (2017)
  - Total: 2,304
- Demonym: turroti
- Time zone: UTC+1 (CET)
  - Summer (DST): UTC+2 (CEST)
- Postal code: 95010
- Dialing code: 095

Torre Archirafi (Sicilian: A Turri) is a frazione of the comune (municipality) of Riposto in the Catania area of southern Italy. The small fishing village is located about 32 kilometres (20 mi) northeast of Catania and about 3 kilometres (1.9 mi) south of Riposto.

== History ==
The name comes from Torre di Archirafi or the Archirafi Tower, a coastal watchtower, built to repel Barbary corsairs in the 16th century and later destroyed by the sea sometime in the 17th century. The town itself was ceded to the Duke of Archirafi, Giovanni Natoli Ruffo, by King Charles III of Bourbon in the 17th century.

== Places of interest ==
The inhabited area has kept the old historic public center fairly intact which includes the Palazzo Vigo, a large townhome built in the 18th century by Giovanni Natoli Ruffo, Duke of Archirafi. Today, the building is primarily used for art exhibitions, conferences, and lectures.
