= Monte Arcosu =

Mountain in Italy

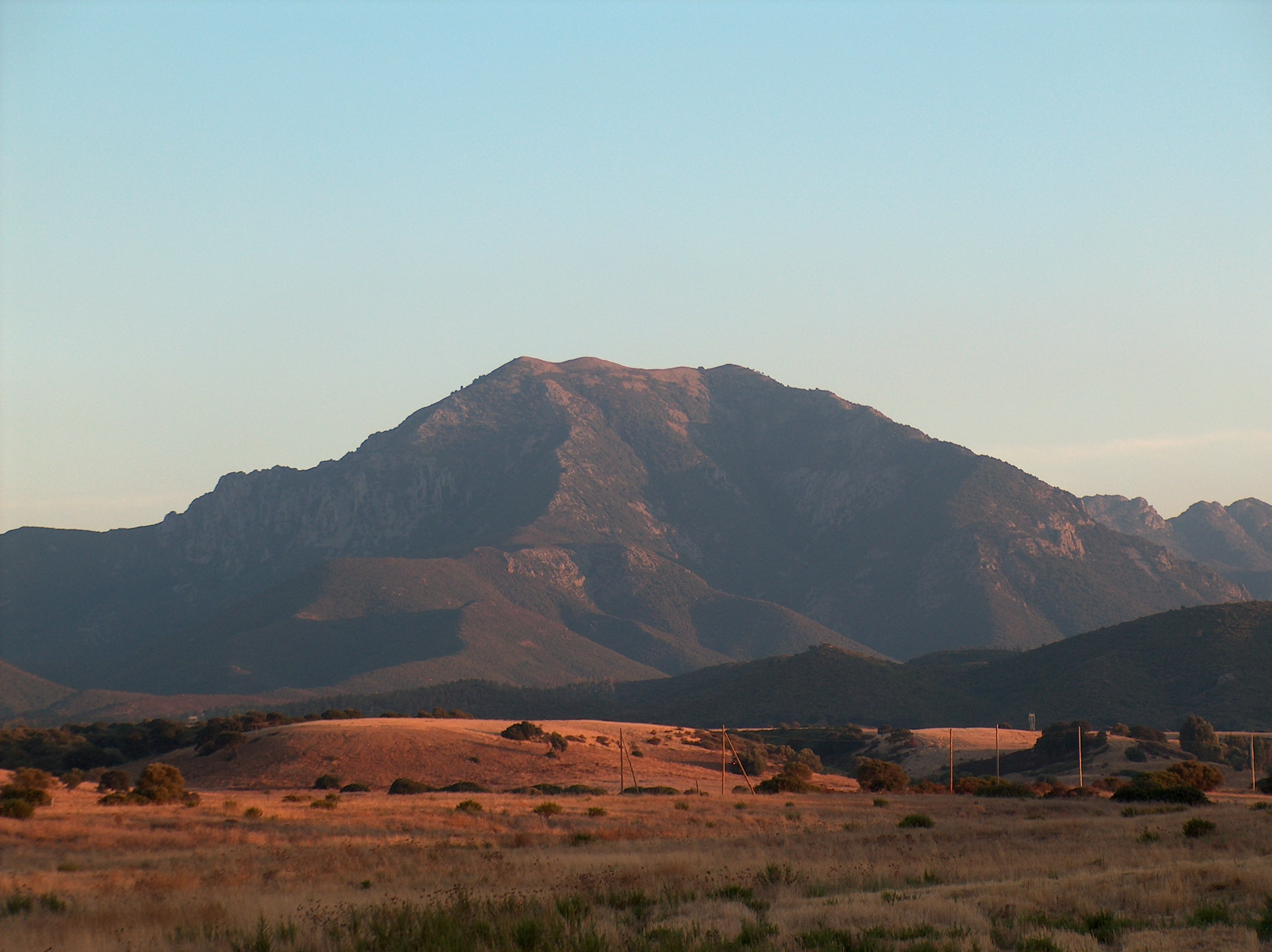

Highest point
- Elevation: 948 m (3,110 ft)
- Coordinates: 39°11′42″N 8°51′25″E

Geography
- Location within Italy
- Location: Sardinia, Italy
- Parent range: Sulcis Mountains

Monte Arcosu is a mountain in the Sulcis massif, in southern Sardinia, Italy. It has an elevation of 948 metres (3,110 ft).

The mountain has a characteristically truncated cone shape, resulting from the differential erosion which followed its formation during the Variscan orogeny. The massif is formed by a granitic intrusion from the Carboniferous, lying on a Paleozoic schist basement and in turn surmounted by Paleozoic scists. The Variscan orogeny removed the upper schist layer from all the massif's peaks but Monte Arcosu, modelling it and showing the granite along the steep slopes.

== Sources ==
- Barca, Sebastiano; Di Gregorio, Felice (1993). "Geologia e paesaggio in Sulcis". I Parchi della Sardegna. Cagliari: Edisar. pp. 238–240. ISBN 88-86004-35-4.
