= Jankovice (Uherské Hradiště District) =

- Municipality
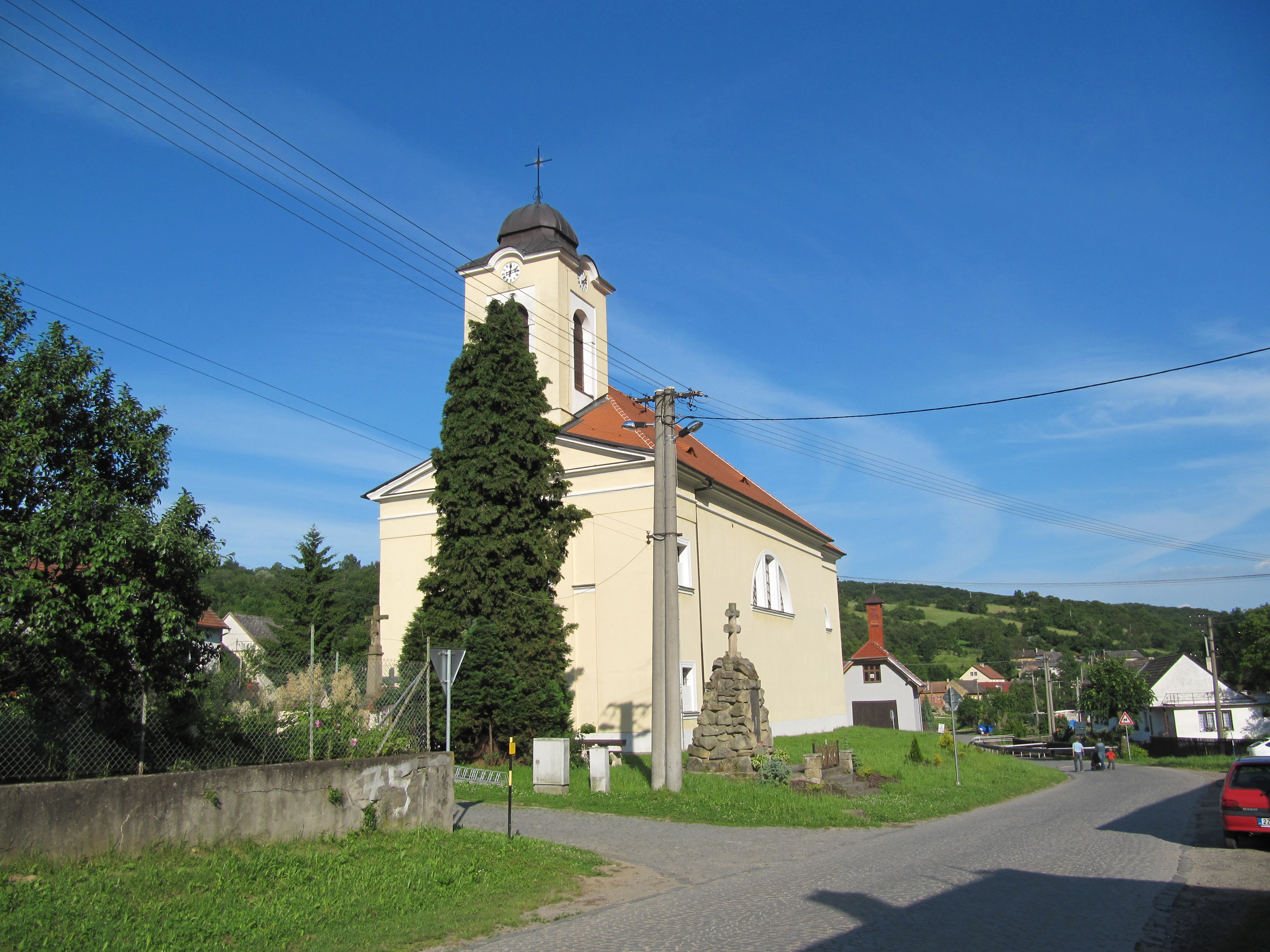
- Church of the Assumption of the Virgin Mary

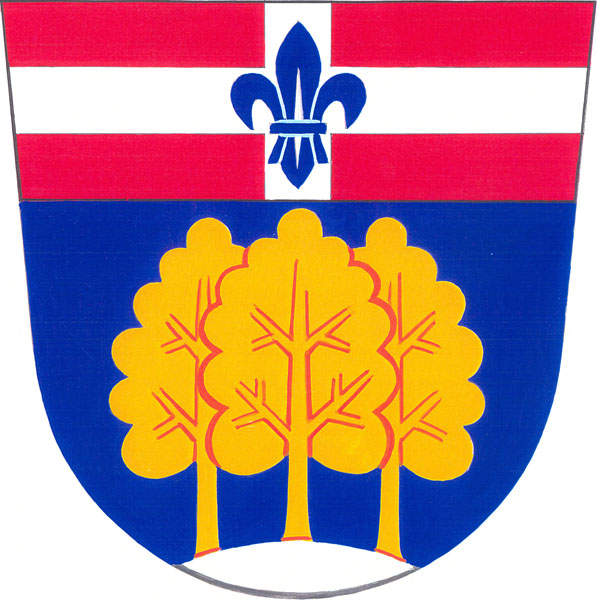
- Flag Coat of arms

- Location in the Czech Republic
- Coordinates: 49°9′15″N 17°23′19″E
- Country: Czech Republic
- Region: Zlín
- District: Uherské Hradiště
- Founded: 1648

Area
  - Total: 11.27 km^{2} (4.35 sq mi)
- Elevation: 277 m (909 ft)

Population (2026-01-01)
  - Total: 440
  - Density: 39/km^{2} (100/sq mi)
- Time zone: UTC+1 (CET)
  - Summer (DST): UTC+2 (CEST)
- Postal code: 687 04
- Website: www.jankovice.cz

Jankovice is a municipality and village in Uherské Hradiště District in the Zlín Region of the Czech Republic. It has about 400 inhabitants.

Jankovice lies approximately 12 kilometres (7 mi) north-west of Uherské Hradiště, 23 km (14 mi) west of Zlín, and 238 km (148 mi) south-east of Prague.

== Demographics ==
Historical population
Year	Pop.	±%
1869	657	—
1880	722	+9.9%
1890	740	+2.5%
1900	760	+2.7%
1910	815	+7.2%
1921	777	−4.7%
1930	723	−6.9%
1950	730	+1.0%
1961	778	+6.6%
1970	748	−3.9%
1980	576	−23.0%
1991	517	−10.2%
2001	497	−3.9%
2011	459	−7.6%
2021	432	−5.9%
Source: Censuses
