= Paar (river) =

River in Germany

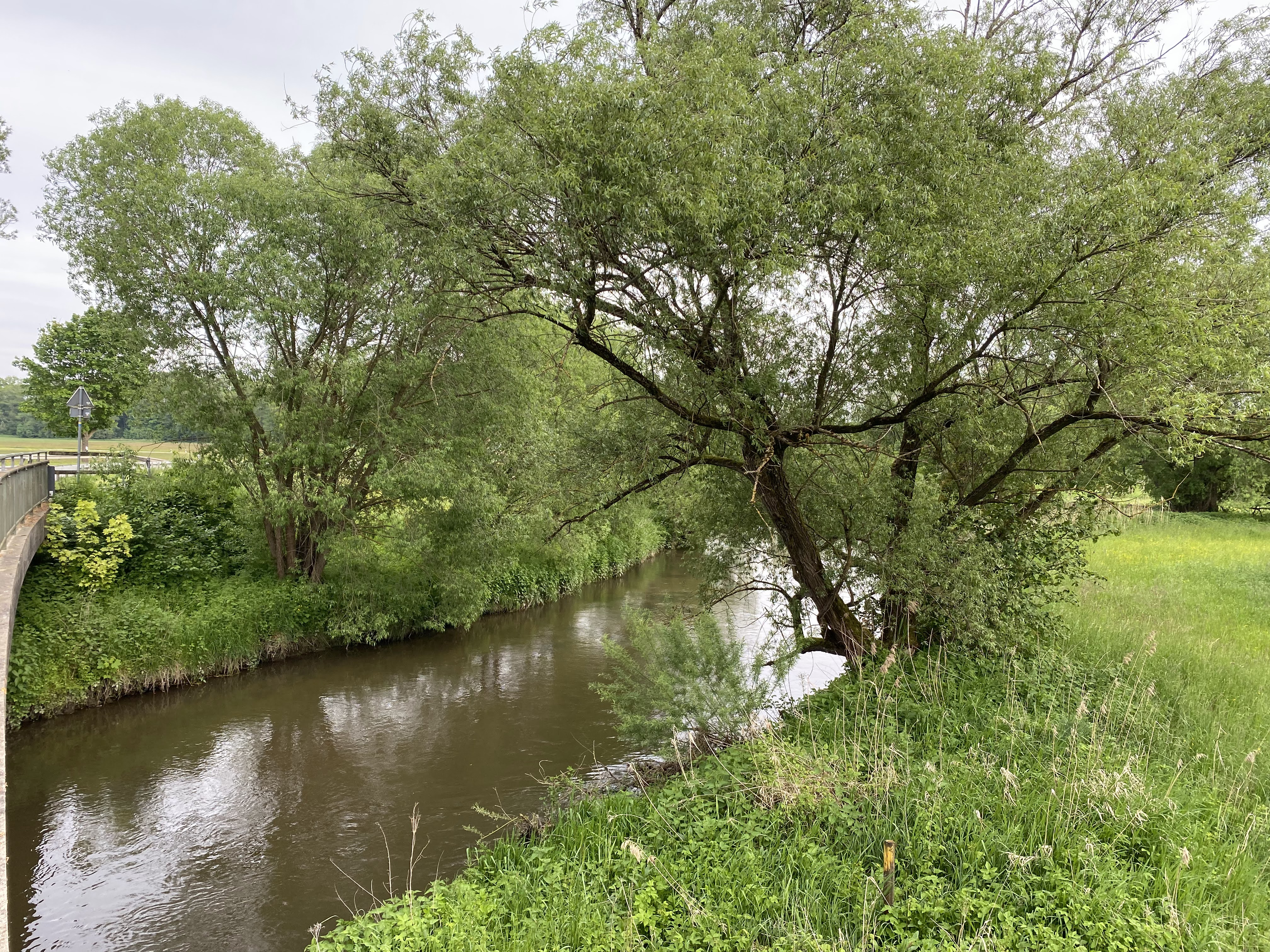
- The Paar at Kühbach, Bavaria

Location
- Country: Germany
- State: Bavaria

Physical characteristics
- Source
  - location: Upper Bavaria
- Mouth
  - location: Danube
  - coordinates: 48°46′24″N 11°36′54″E
- Length: 136.8 km (85.0 mi)
- Basin size: 1,239 km^{2} (478 sq mi)

Basin features
- Progression: Danube→ Black Sea

The Paar (German pronunciation: [paːɐ]) is a river of Bavaria, Germany. It is a right tributary of the Danube. For several tens of kilometers, the Paar flows parallel to the Lech, at only a few km distance. Near Augsburg, the Paar leaves the Lech valley and turns north-east towards Ingolstadt. It flows into the Danube near Vohburg. Towns and municipalities along the Paar include Egling, Mering, Aichach, Schrobenhausen and Manching.

== See also ==
- List of rivers of Bavaria
