= Sturzo =

Sturzo is an Italian surname. Notable people with the surname include:

- Luigi Sturzo (1871–1959), Italian Roman Catholic priest and politician, brother of Mario
  - Luigi Sturzo Institute
- Mario Sturzo (1861–1941), Italian Roman Catholic bishop
