= Calogero Conti =

Member of the Sicilian Mafia

- Born: 1924; Ramacca, Sicily, Kingdom of Italy
- Died: 4 September 2020 (aged 95); Ramacca, Sicily, Italy
- Other name: "Zu Liddu"
- Occupation: Mafia boss
- Known for: Head of the Ramacca Mafia family
- Allegiance: Ramacca Mafia family / Cosa Nostra

Calogero Conti (1924 – 4 September 2020), commonly referred to as "Zu Liddu," was a prominent Sicilian mafioso, historically identified as the capo of the Ramacca Mafia family.

== Criminal career ==
Calogero Conti, born in 1924, was described by multiple state witnesses, including the well-known pentiti Antonino Calderone and Francesco Di Carlo, as the head of the mafia family in Ramacca and the deputy representative of Cosa Nostra for the province of Catania. Calderone, in testimony given in April 1987 before Judge Giovanni Falcone and Vice-Commissioner Antonio Manganelli in Marseille, emphasized Conti’s strong ties to the Corleonesi, particularly to Luciano Leggio, Salvatore Toto Riina, and Bernardo Provenzano. These revelations contributed to the Criminalpool anti-mafia operation a year later, which led to 160 arrest warrants across Sicily and the exposure of mafia networks involving businessmen, politicians, and mafiosi.

Calogero Conti and his son Francesco were among those arrested in Ramacca during this operation. Among the various anecdotes about his influence, one involved him acting as "padrino" for Francesco "Ciccio" La Rocca, who later became the boss of the Caltagirone mafia family. Additionally, Conti was said to have helped Luciano Leggio during a period of hiding in the Ramacca countryside and allegedly facilitated the purchase of land in Vaccarizzo where a villa was built, purportedly adapted to hold kidnap victims.

Although Conti was no longer active in mafia-related judicial cases in his later years, he continued to be mentioned by informants in connection to historical events and individuals in organized crime. In one intercepted conversation referenced during the Iblis trial, a case involving suspected ties between the mafia, politics, and business in the Catania area, Conti was mentioned as the father of Francesco Conti and grandfather to Sara Conti, whose involvement in a local social assistance project raised questions from prosecutors due to alleged connections with mafia-affiliated individuals.

Calogero Conti died of natural causes in his home in Ramacca on September 4, 2020, at the age of 95. For reasons of public order and security, the Chief of Police in Catania prohibited public funeral rites. The funeral was held privately at dawn in the cemetery chapel of Ramacca, without a procession or public ceremony, and was monitored by the Carabinieri to ensure compliance with the imposed restrictions.
