= Maurizio Di Gati =

Member of the Sicilian Mafia

Maurizio Di Gati

Maurizio Di Gati (Italian pronunciation: [mauˈrittsjo di ˈɡaːti]; born July 10, 1966, in Racalmuto) is a Sicilian mafioso and was considered to be the boss of the Agrigento province before his arrest in November 2006.

== Background ==
Di Gati was born in Racalmuto, in the province of Agrigento, the hometown of the famous Sicilian writer Leonardo Sciascia. He became a barber. However, when in 1991 his elder brother Diego Di Gati was killed in a vendetta with a rival mafia-like group, the Stidda, he decided to become a 'man of honour' to avenge his brother. According to reports, his affiliating godfather ("padrino d’affiliazione") was Francesco La Rocca, who was then the head of the Caltagirone mafia family.

He was supposed to be made capoprovincia at a meeting of Mafia families from Agrigento on July 14, 2002, in Santa Margherita di Belice. Di Gati was sponsored by Antonino Giuffrè, while Bernardo Provenzano preferred Giuseppe Falsone from Campobello di Licata.

== Disappearance and capture ==
However, the police interrupted the summit. Di Gati was able to escape before the raid. He stepped aside as provincial boss for Falsone due to the opposition of Provenzano to his position and after the arrest of Giuffrè.

Di Gati was arrested on November 25, 2006, in Villaggio Mosè, near Agrigento. He was a fugitive since 1999, when he was convicted to six years incarceration for Mafia conspiracy. In December 2006 he decided to become a collaborating state witness and whisteblower on the cosa nostra corleonesi clan (pentito).
