= Salvatore Seminara =

Member of the Sicilian Mafia

Salvatore Seminara (born in 1946), also known as "zio Turiddu," is a Sicilian mafioso from Caltagirone. Officially a livestock breeder based in the town of Mirabella Imbaccari, Seminara served as the capo of the Caltagirone Mafia family and also held the position of appointed representative of the Cosa Nostra in the province of Enna, with both roles assumed under the authority of the late notorious boss Francesco La Rocca.

== Criminal career ==
Born in the city of Caltagirone, in the province of Catania, Seminara's criminal career began to rise in the early 2000s, thanks to the influence of Francesco La Rocca, a feared and respected man of honour and historical capo of the Caltagirone Mafia family, who allowed Seminara to gain a significant foothold within Cosa Nostra. La Rocca, who was at the helm of mafia operations across a vast territory around the Caltagirone area, saw in Seminara a reliable ally and appointed him as his trusted lieutenant during the period between 2008 and 2014. In addition to his hometown, Seminara’s reach also extended to the province of Enna, where, following Raffaele Bevilacqua's arrest in 2006, he was appointed as the province's representative on the Interprovincial Commission.

La Rocca’s mentorship was crucial for Seminara's rise, as the Caltagirone boss entrusted him with managing a significant territory, allowing him to expand his influence within the Cosa Nostra. After La Rocca's arrest, Seminara took over the reins of Caltagirone Mafia family, effectively assuming control over the criminal empire that La Rocca had built. Seminara’s role as the boss of Caltagirone was officially recognized in 2016, when he was sentenced to 21 years in prison for mafia association aggravated by his role as a mafia leader. This conviction came after a series of previous sentences, including those for his actions in the "Old One" and "Good Fellas" cases. In these, he was found guilty of being a key figure in reorganizing the Cosa Nostra in the province of Enna, in particular the mafia families of Enna and Leonforte, both of which had been dismantled by law enforcement.

Seminara's criminal enterprises were not limited to illegal activities but also extended into legitimate sectors, particularly agriculture. His wealth, much of which was derived from mafia activities such as extortion, contributed to his enduring influence. In 2011, the Direzione Investigativa Antimafia confiscated assets belonging to Seminara, including properties, land, and securities valued at 10 million euros, following an extensive investigation into his financial dealings. Despite being imprisoned, Seminara managed to accumulate a significant fortune, earning him the title of a mafia boss with considerable resources.

One of the most infamous crimes associated with Seminara was the 2015 double murder of Salvatore Cutrona and Francesco Turrisi. The crime, carried out in true mafia fashion, saw Cutrona killed for betraying Seminara and distancing himself from the mafia group. Turrisi, a bystander, was also murdered in what was seen as collateral damage. Seminara was convicted of being the mastermind behind this brutal act and sentenced to life imprisonment.

Seminara never cooperated with investigators and always denied the charges against him, maintaining his image as a respected figure within Cosa Nostra. His continued resistance to cooperation with law enforcement led authorities to classify him as a high-risk individual, placing him under the strict 41-bis regime, a special prison protocol for mafia leaders. His detention under these conditions began in 2016, after his arrest following a brief period of freedom.
