= Mario Sturzo =

Italian Catholic bishop (1861–1941)

- Bishop of Piazza Armerina
- Church: Catholic Church
- Diocese: Diocese of Piazza Armerina
- In office: 22 June 1903 – 12 November 1941
- Predecessor: Mariano Palermo
- Successor: Antonino Catarella

Orders
- Ordination: 21 September 1889
- Consecration: 29 June 1903 by Giuseppe Francica-Nava de Bontifè

Personal details
- Born: 2 November 1861 Caltagirone, Province of Catania, Kingdom of Italy
- Died: 12 November 1941 (aged 80)

Mario Sturzo (Caltagirone, November 2, 1861 – Piazza Armerina, November 12, 1941) was an Italian Roman Catholic bishop.

== Biography ==
=== Family and early life ===
He was the second born out of the six children of Felix Sturzo Taranto and Catherine Boscarelli, among his brothers, ten years younger, was Luigi Sturzo. He joined the well known seminary at a very young age where he knew Bishop Blandini known for his social commitment. In 1881 he inscribed in the Law Faculty of Catania. and then continued his legal studies in Rome. In his youth he was the president and the chief promoter of the Catholic Youth Club "St. Thomas Aquinas", whereby lay Catholics gathered.

=== Priesthood ===
In 1887, at the age of 26, returned to the seminary in Caltagirone, and on September 21, 1889, was ordained a priest by Xavier Gerbino, previously the Bishop of Piazza Armerina.

He was rector of the seminary of Caltagirone in 1890-1891 and among his pupils was his brother Luigi, whom he helped to reach priesthood. He was later appointed canon of the Cathedral of Caltagirone, and then vicar general. In 1894 he coordinated the work of the first diocesan synod. In his priestly activity he collaborated with his brother Louis to promote the Catholic movement Calatino. In 1895 the first interparochial committee of organization of congresses in St. George's parish, with the youth section “St. Philip Neri”, the workers section, St. Joseph" and the agricultural section, “St. Isidor”. In 1897 he collaborated in the redaction of the Catholic movement Calatino review, “The Cross of Constantine”, in which he published three novels of the popular-moralistic character with the pseudonym Eneleo in the appendix. Moreover, he wrote 27 sketches which highlight his initial inclination for Christianity embodied in the story.

=== Activities as a bishop ===
In 1903, Pope Leo XIII appointed him Bishop of Piazza Armerina. He was consecrated in the cathedral of Catania by Cardinal Francesco Nava on July 19, took possession of the diocese on 11 October, and made the solemn entry on 15 November 1904. In his first pastoral letter, of November 1903, he maintains, on the wake of the thought of his brother Luigi's thought, that, for obtaining salvation of souls one cannot ignore so as to pursue interests of the body, through a commitment in the renewal of the society in the light of the social teaching of the church. He realized a general reorganization of the diocesan clergy and erected numerous parishes in almost all the twelve town councils of the diocese. He refounded the diocesan monthly bulletin, changing the title from “Gleaning” to “The Angel of the Family”. His episcopal activities were carried on, in the periodic pastoral visits, in the celebration of meetings of “Catholic Action”, in the Lenten preachings and retreats and in the conference for teachers and professionals. He reformed morally and materially the diocesan seminary, closed temporarily from 1904 to 1907 and from 1920 he started his activity of teaching in the internal school of the seminary.

He founded in the diocese the priestly congregation of the Oblates of Mary, on the example required by Carlo Borromeo, for which he laid the constitutions and of which he organized the common life. In the villages of his diocese he favoured the rise of rural banks and other Catholic Social works. Some local officials accused him to the Holy See of modernism and socialism and was sent to the diocese as apostolic visitor, Charles Joseph Cecchini, who wrote to pope Pius X on 19 August 1907 a letter accompanied by a positive report on his reforms.

He established in Piazza Armerina a Catholic School named after Prospero Intorcetta. He wrote numerous pastoral letters in which a cross-recurring theme was that of the family and moral education. He also wrote on the theme of psychological intense activity of the conversion and outlined a theology of the laity. For a decade he was also a secretary of the Sicilian Episcopal Conference and spread some collective pastoral letters. In 1937 he addressed at Enna the first Congress of the parish.

=== Activities as a scholar ===
He was interested in philosophical studies, attempting to rinnovate the Scholastic Philosophy with the aim of putting the contemporary culture at the service of God and of the church as an apostolate instrument. From 1915 he collaborated with the neo-scholastic review. And critically confronted with some of the main exponents of the Western Philosophy, including Maurice Blondel, Etienne Gilson and Benedetto Croce, opposed to positivism and idealism. In 1927, after making contacts with scholars of the Catholic Institute in Paris and in Milan, with Fr. Agostino Gemelli, he founded in Piazza armerina a Literary-Philosophical Review (Review of Autoformation), that resumed faithfully in format and in the graphic the review, “Critic of Benedetto Croce”. He himself taught literature and philosophy, publishing notes which later on were collected in volumes.

=== Correspondences in exile and relations with Fascist Italy ===
During the exile of his brother Luigi, former secretary of the Italian Popular Party, he exchanged with him many letters in which they discussed philosophy, theology, literature and mysticism. They loved and respected one another, but they criticized each other and at the same time strengthening one another spiritually. From those letters emerges despite the difference of their personality and of their personal histories, their profounding spirituality- the common anxiety of sanctity, the great intellectual approach and pastoral charity which led them to deepen the cultural and social relevance of the faith lived in the internal of the church. The two brothers do not write about politics just as “special surveillants” of the fascist regime. In the central archive of the State there are over a thousand sheets that refer to Sturzo don Luigi, was Felix, anti fascist. For Mario exist about three hundred sheets in the same archive in two funds. Mons. Mario Sturzo had an uncompromising attitude toward the fascist regime attracting ungenerous slanders and veiled persecutions which he endured with firmness and evangelical patience as ensues from the documentation preserved in the central archive of the state.

== Philosophy and neo-syntheticism ==
The initial aspect from which Sturzo begins his philosophical research is the “thought relation-action. Surely the action will be worthy of admiration only if it will have philosophical foundation and anthropological objective. For Sturzo there will be no true philosophical research if not in the history and at the service of the same, philosophy becomes almost the methodology of history in the sense that it gives method in living and in reading the same. “Sturzo, writes Salvatore Latora in opposition-dialogue with the modern philosophy goes on elaborating its philosophical system- the neo-synthetism, which inspired in a critical manner I. Kant and A. Rosmini, wants to propose a new form of classical realism and christian, supporting the thesis of priority of synthesis on analysis, which has at its centre man” (Latora Salvatore, Sturzo Mario, in Encyclopedic Dictionary of Thinkers and of Theologians of Sicily, 19th and 20th Centuries, vol. VI, Salvatore Sciascia editor, Caltanisetta- Rome, 2010, 3062). The comparison with the epistemological subjectivism and the historicism of the “neo-Italian idealists” led him to grant a privilege to the role of the subject in the known process in a synthesis between immanence and transcendence, between natural and supernatural.

== Call by the Holy See ==
His life was not of easy paths or foreseen, indeed, his activity of philosophical research, had disapproval of the ecclesiastical hierarchy of the time. In 1931 there was a call of Holy Office of 17 January and came to be published an editorial of Catholic Civilization in which the content and language of Sturzo's thought were criticized as they seemed to be closer to the neo-idealism of Cross and Gentile which are not to the Scholastic and Thomistic philosophy. They also criticize even his doctrine on knowledge, as also the concepts of philosophy and history. The explicit call of Holy Office put an end to the activity of the “Autoreformation Review” and brought the bishop to the public retraction in cathedral, after the solemn pontifical mass of 8 April 1931. On 19 of the same month the Osservatore Romano published the news, leaving his brother Luigi, who was from London in darkness of all stunned. Immediately after this order from the part of the Holy See, Monsignor Sturzo suspended the publication of the “Autoreformation Review” because, as he writes to his brother “in it, it is seen not as a service but a struggle”.
