= Garibaldi Theatre =

The Garibaldi Theatre (Italian: Teatro Garibaldi) is the name of many theatres in Italy, particularly in Sicily:

- Garibaldi Theatre (Enna)
- Garibaldi Theatre (Modica)
- Garibaldi Theatre (Padua)
- Garibaldi Theatre (Palermo)
- Garibaldi Theatre (Piazza Armerina)
- Garibaldi Theatre (Ragusa)
- Garibaldi Theatre (Treviso)
