= Ramacca Mafia family =

Crime family of the Sicilian mafia

- Founded: 1950s
- Founder: Calogero “Liddu” Conti
- Founding location: Ramacca, Sicily
- Years active: 1950s–present
- Territory: Ramacca and surrounding cities.
- Ethnicity: Sicilians
- Activities: extortion, corruption, price fixing, political corruption
- Allies: Catania Mafia family Caltagirone Mafia family Corleone Mafia family

The Ramacca Mafia family is a crime family of the Cosa Nostra, operating primarily in the town of Ramacca, Sicily. With roots tracing back to the 1950s under the leadership of Calogero Conti, the family established itself through activities such as extortion, infiltration of public contracts, and political influence. Over the decades, the Ramacca Mafia has maintained control over local economic interests while fostering alliances with powerful neighboring families and political figures to strengthen its grip on the territory.

== History ==
=== Origins ===
The mafia presence in Ramacca traces back to the 1950s with Calogero “Liddu” Conti emerging as its central figure. Described by key informants such as Antonino Calderone and Francesco Di Carlo, Conti was regarded as the head of the mafia in Ramacca and vice-representative of Cosa Nostra for the province of Catania. He also maintained significant ties with the Corleonesi, including Luciano Leggio, Toto Riina, and Bernardo Provenzano, and reportedly facilitated Leggio’s refuge in the Ramacca countryside during his fugitive years. Conti also acted as mafia godfather to Francesco "Ciccio" La Rocca, later head of the Caltagirone Mafia family.

Calogero “Liddu” Conti was the undisputed head of the mafia in Ramacca for decades, but in his later years, due to advanced age and voluntary withdrawal, he stepped back from leadership, leaving the position to Pietro Iudicelli. However, Iudicelli was unable to maintain the same level of control and power, and the mafia family entered a period of crisis. Conti eventually died in 2020, having already withdrawn from criminal activities and public attention.

=== Reorganization: the rise of Oliva and Di Dio ===
In the early 2000s, Vincenzo Aiello, top echelon member of the Catania Mafia family, assumed control of the broader Calatino area, designating Pasquale Oliva as his operative in Ramacca, closely supported by Rosario Di Dio. The two formed a strategic and personal alliance, bolstered by family ties. Di Dio, a key figure in the Iblis investigation, rose in prominence after 2003, seeking authorization to operate in Palagonia, a request allegedly granted by Francesco La Rocca and Alfio Mirabile.

Di Dio’s role was confirmed by intercepts and intelligence from the ROS, indicating his involvement in extortion schemes and oversight of public infrastructure projects. Along with Aiello and Costanzo Franco, Di Dio extorted money from construction projects like the Palagonia metanoduct and bypass roads. His activities led to a 20-year prison sentence and the confiscation of assets worth €12.5 million.

Simultaneously, entrepreneurs Giovanni Buscemi and Massimo Oliva functioned as mafia-linked intermediaries, securing public works through extortion and collusion. Their work was sustained by political protection, particularly from Fausto Fagone, former mayor of Palagonia, who was accused of providing access and influence to criminal networks in return for electoral and financial support.

=== Contemporary influence and political infiltration ===
Despite arrests and prosecutions, the Ramacca mafia remains active, as demonstrated by the 2025 ROS operation, which resulted in the arrest of 19 individuals and the seizure of assets connected to mafia-controlled funeral services. The investigation revealed continued influence of the Santapaola-Ercolano network in Ramacca, with remnants of the local mafia maintaining territorial control and economic interests.

The operation exposed the mafia’s ability to infiltrate local politics, including the 2021 municipal elections in Ramacca. Allegedly, mafia affiliates Antonio Di Benedetto and Salvatore Mendolia arranged a deal with candidates Nunzio Vitale and Salvatore Fornaro to secure votes in exchange for public contracts. Both candidates were elected, with Fornaro becoming vice-president of the municipal council, further cementing the mafia’s strategic position within local governance.
