= Raddusa =

- Comune
- Comune di Raddusa
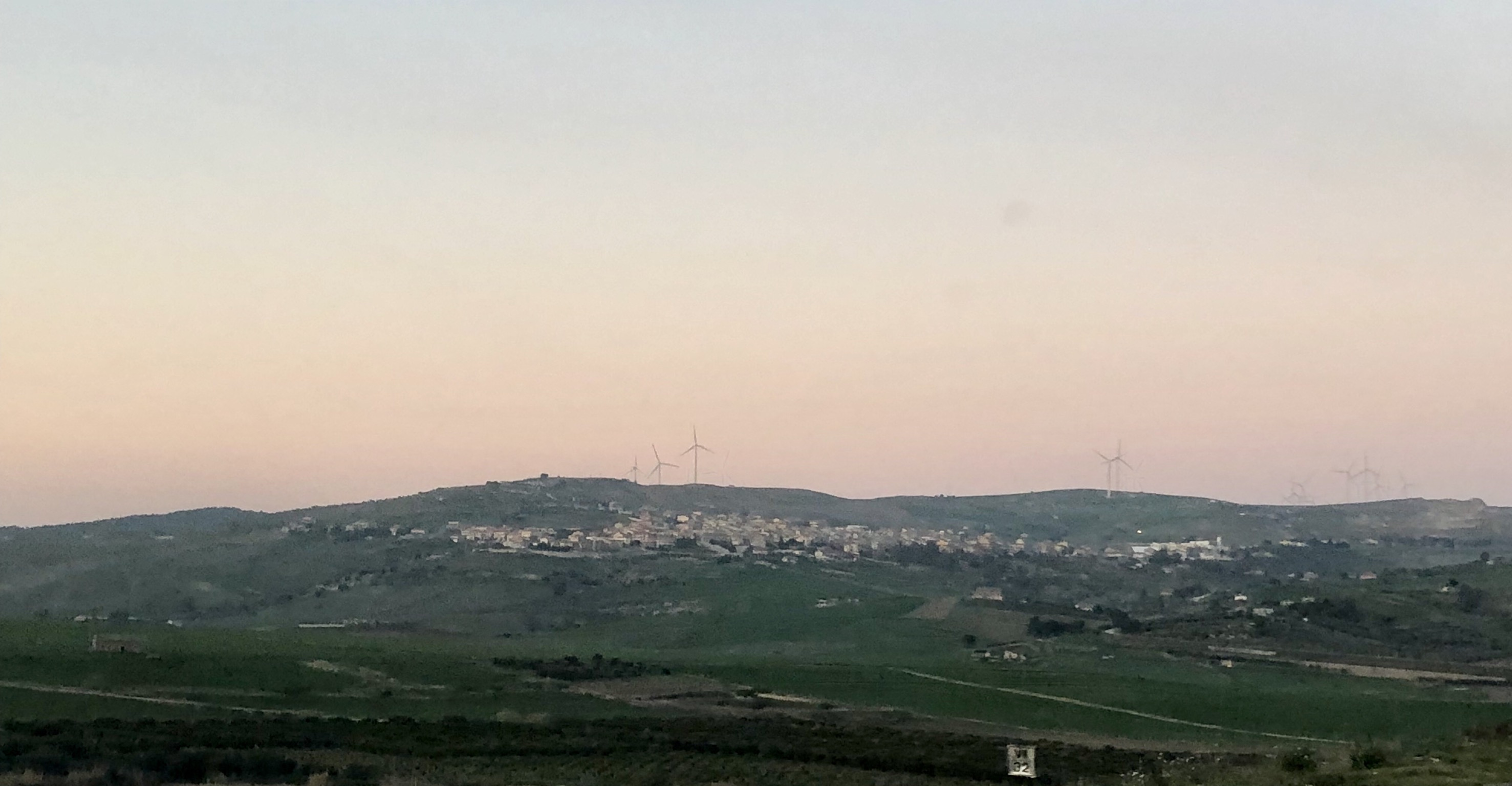
- Panorama of Raddusa

- Location within Italy Location within Sicily
- Coordinates: 37°28′N 14°32′E
- Country: Italy
- Region: Sicily
- Metropolitan city: Catania (CT)

Government
  - Mayor: Giovanni Allegra

Area
  - Total: 23.3 km^{2} (9.0 sq mi)
- Elevation: 350 m (1,150 ft)

Population (31 December 2014)
  - Total: 3,174
  - Density: 136/km^{2} (353/sq mi)
- Demonym: Raddusani
- Time zone: UTC+1 (CET)
  - Summer (DST): UTC+2 (CEST)
- Postal code: 95040
- Dialing code: 095
- Website: www.comune.raddusa.ct.it

Raddusa is a comune (municipality) in the Province of Catania in the Italian region of Sicily, located about 130 kilometres (81 mi) southeast of Palermo and about 45 kilometres (28 mi) west of Catania near the lake Ogliastro.

Raddusa borders the following municipalities: Aidone, Assoro, Piazza Armerina, Castel di Judica, Ramacca.

== Economy ==
The main business of the town is based on agriculture, mainly of cereals, therefore, it is named "The City of Grain" and every year in September for three days the citizen gather in the town center to celebrate their traditional Festa del Grano or Grain's Feast to remember the local traditions.
