= Emmanuello =

Emmanuello is an Italian surname. Notable people with the surname include:

- Daniele Emmanuello (1963–2007), Italian mobster
- Simone Emmanuello (born 1994), Italian footballer

== See also ==
- Emmanuelle (given name)
