= Michele Pennisi =

Italian Archbishop

The Most Reverend Michele Pennisi
- Archbishop Emeritus of Monreale
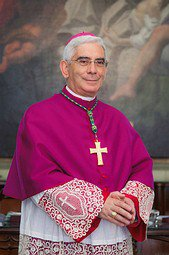
- Church: Catholic Church
- Archdiocese: Monreale
- See: Monreale
- Appointed: 8 February 2013
- Installed: 26 April 2013
- Term ended: 28 April 2022
- Predecessor: Salvatore Di Cristina
- Successor: Gualtiero Isacchi
- Previous post: Bishop of Piazza Armerina (2002-13)

Orders
- Ordination: 9 September 1972 by Carmelo Canzonieri
- Consecration: 3 July 2002 by Salvatore De Giorgi

Personal details
- Born: Michele Pennisi; 23 November 1946 (age 79) Licodia Eubea, Sicily, Italy
- Education: Almo Collegio Capranica
- Motto: Caritas Christi urget
- Coat of arms

Michele Pennisi (born 23 November 1946) is an Italian Archbishop of the Catholic Church in Sicily, and a noted opponent of the Sicilian Mafia. He served as Archbishop of Monreale from 8 February 2013 to 28 April 2022. Following the reorganisation of the Sicilian church in 2000, Archbishops of Monreale are no longer Metropolitans, but they retain the personal rank of Archbishop.

== Birth and education ==
Pennisi was born in the town of Licodia Eubea, Sicily, on 23 November 1946.

From an early age, he actively participated in the Communion and Liberation movement. He was ordained as a priest on 9 September 1972 by Bishop Carmelo Canzonieri, after studying at the prestigious Almo Collegio Capranica in Rome.

== Church career ==
After parish work, Pennisi became involved in theological education. From 1985 to 1992 he was rector of the episcopal seminary of Caltagirone in Sicily, and from 1997 to 2002 he was rector of the Almo Collegio Capranica in Rome, where he had himself been a student previously.

Pope John Paul II appointed him Bishop of Piazza Armerina on 12 April 2002, and he was consecrated as bishop in Piazza Armerina Cathedral on 3 July 2002.

On 8 February 2013 Pope Benedict XVI appointed him Archbishop of Monreale, and he was enthroned on 26 April 2013.

On 21 September 2017 he was elected vice-president of the Sicilian Episcopal Conference.

On 28 April 2022 Pope Francis accepted Pennisi's letter of resignation as archbishop of the Archdiocese of Monreale, appointing Gualtiero Isacchi to replace him on the same day.

== Opposition to the Sicilian Mafia ==
Pennisi has lived throughout his life on the island of Sicily, and in his working life has become an outspoken critic and opponent of the Sicilian Mafia. In the early part of 2008, he received a permanent police escort following death threats received from the mafia. He has worked for legal reforms allowing courts to strip convicted mafiosi of their property and has banned churches from allowing religious rites for confraternities whose membership includes mafiosi.

In 2007 he refused to allow a cathedral funeral service for convicted mafia chief Daniele Emmanuello, who had been killed during a shoot-out with police. Ten years later in 2017, despite death threats over the Emmanuello refusal, he again refused to permit any type of public church funeral service for convicted Mafia chief Salvatore (Toto) Riina who had died in prison, describing the Mafia leader as "a public sinner" ("un pubblico peccatore").

On 17 March 2017, Pennisi again made news headlines for opposing the Sicilian Mafia, when he issued a blanket ban on known mafiosi becoming Godfathers to children within his diocese, stating that the application of the title to organised criminals could be an attempt to legitimise their crime through association with religion. He had expressed outrage the previous month when Mafia leader Giuseppe Salvatore Riina, the son of Toto Riina, had become a Godfather in a church in Corleone despite a legal injunction preventing his return to the region, after obtaining the necessary permits for exceptional travel from a judge, and of suitable character from a priest in Padua.

== Order of St Lazarus of Jerusalem ==
In March 2014 Don Carlos Gereda y de Borbón, Marquês of Almazán and 49th Grand Master of the Military and Hospitaller Order of St Lazarus of Jerusalem, with the consent of Patriarch Gregory III Laham, the Patriarch of Antioch and Spiritual Protector of the Order of St Lazarus, appointed Pennisi as the international Ecclesiastical Grand Prior of the Order.
