= Piazza Armerina Cathedral =

Cathedral in Piazza Armerina, Sicily, Italy

Coordinates: 37.3849°N 14.3641°E

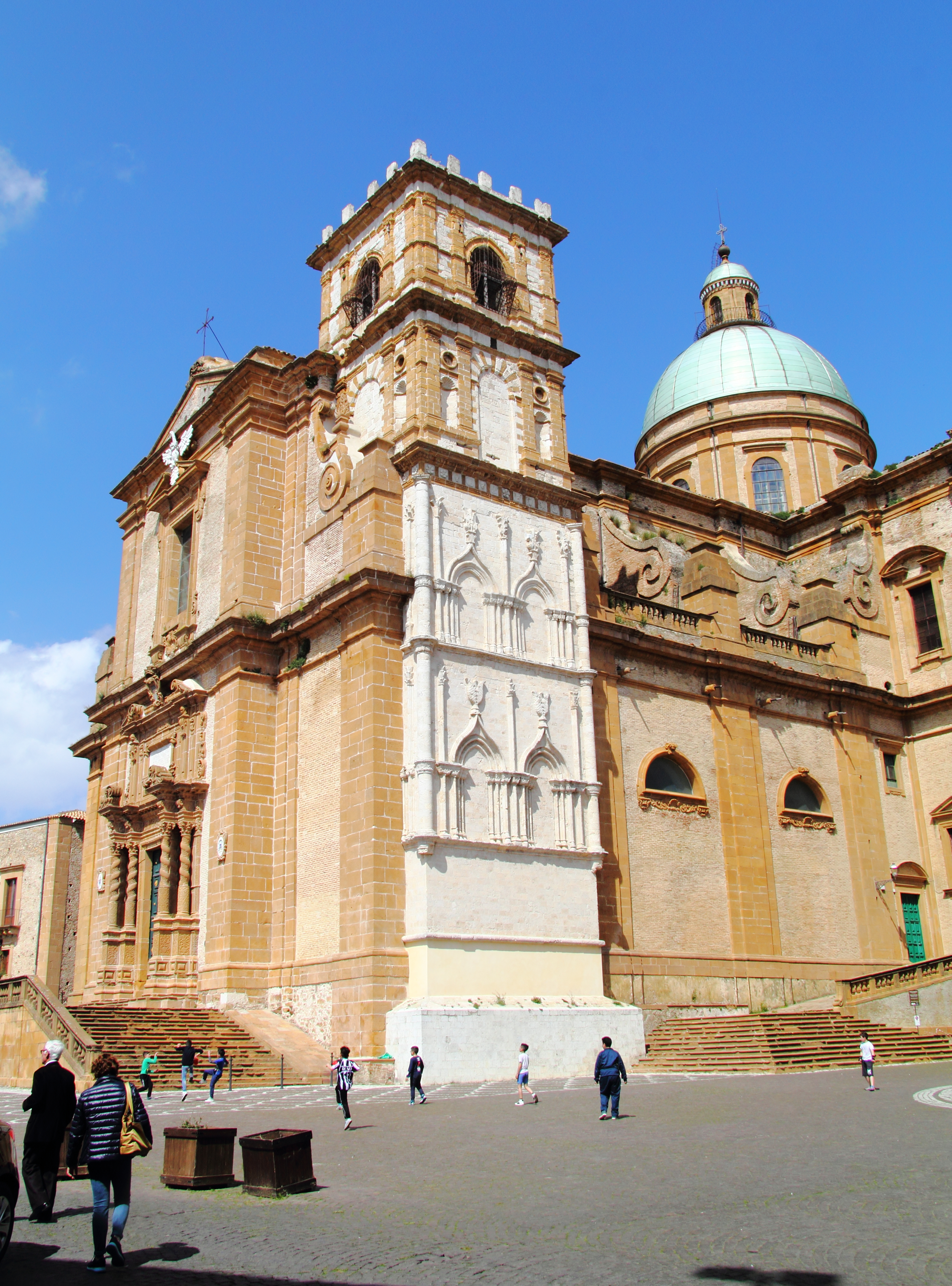
Piazza Armerina Cathedral

Piazza Armerina Cathedral (Italian: Cattedrale di Maria Santissima delle Vittorie, Duomo di Piazza Armerina) is a Roman Catholic cathedral located in Piazza Armerina, Sicily, Italy. The dedication is to Mary of the Victories (Maria Santissima delle Vittorie). It is the seat of the Bishops of Piazza Armerina.

Built on the foundations of an earlier church of the 15th century and based on a design by architect Orazio Torriani, its construction began in 1604 and ended in 1719, while the dome was added in 1768. It became the seat of the Diocese of Piazza (later Piazza Armerina) when it was created in 1817.

The interior of the cathedral is dominated by the central dome. It contains a cross painted on both sides, showing the crucifixion and resurrection of Christ, and a baptistery by Antonello Gagini.

== See also ==
- 18th-century Western domes
