= Daniele Emmanuello =

Member of the Sicilian Mafia

- Mugshot of Daniele Emmanuello.
- Born: 23 July 1963; Gela, Sicily, Italy
- Died: 3 December 2007 (aged 44); Villarosa, Sicily, Italy

Daniele Emanuello (Italian pronunciation: [daˈnjɛːle emmanuˈɛllo]; 23 July 1963 – 3 December 2007) was the head of the Sicilian Mafia in the port city of Gela, Sicily. Emanuello had been a fugitive since 1996, and was subsequently added to the List of most wanted fugitives in Italy. Emanuello was under suspicion and wanted on charges of committing crimes, including mafia association, drug trafficking and murder.

== Death and aftermath ==
On 3 December 2007, Daniele Emanuello was killed by the Italian police while attempting to flee, in Villarosa, near Enna.

Emanuello's family requested a cathedral funeral service, which was refused by Michele Pennisi, Bishop of Piazza Armerina, who was subsequently in receipt of death threats.
