= Luigi Sturzo =

Italian Catholic priest and politician (1871–1959)

Servant of God Senator for life Luigi Sturzo
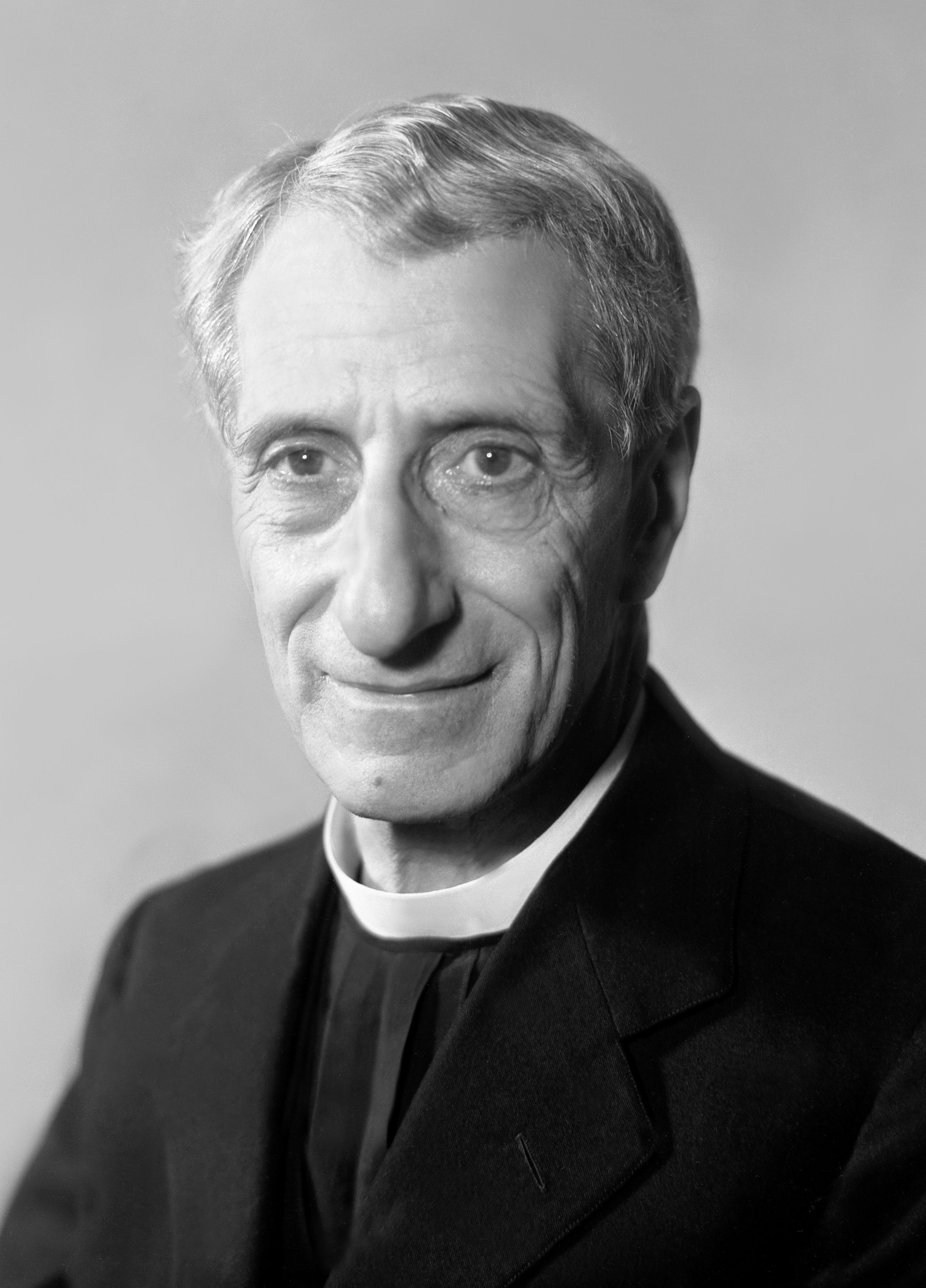
- Official senate portrait, 1958

Member of the Senate of the Republic
- Life tenure 17 September 1952 – 8 August 1959
- Appointed by: Luigi Einaudi

Vice-Mayor of Caltagirone
- In office 1905–1920

Personal details
- Born: 26 November 1871 Caltagirone, Sicily, Kingdom of Italy
- Died: 8 August 1959 (aged 87) Rome, Lazio, Italy
- Party: PPI (1919–1924)
- Relatives: Mario Sturzo (brother)
- Education: Pontifical Gregorian University
- Profession: Catholic priest; educator; politician; writer

Luigi Sturzo (Italian pronunciation: [luˈiːdʒi ˈsturtso]; 26 November 1871 – 8 August 1959) was an Italian Catholic priest, writer and prominent politician. He was known in his lifetime as a former Christian socialist turned popularist, and is considered one of the fathers of the Christian democratic platform. He was also the founder of the Luigi Sturzo Institute in 1951. Sturzo was one of the founders of the Italian People's Party (PPI) in 1919 but was forced into exile in 1924 with the rise of Italian fascism. In exile in London and later New York City, he published over 400 articles (published after his death under the title Miscellanea Londinese) strongly denouncing fascism. Sturzo's cause for canonization opened on 23 March 2002 and he is titled as a Servant of God.

== Early life, family, education, and priesthood (1871–1919) ==
Luigi Sturzo was born on 26 November 1871 in Caltagirone to Felice Sturzo and Caterina Boscarelli. His twin sister was Emanuela (also known as Nelina). One ancestor, Giuseppe Sturzo, served as the mayor of Caltagirone in 1864 until an unspecified time, and another ancestor was Croce Sturzo who wrote about the Roman Question. His two brothers Luigi and Franco Sturzo were well-known Jesuits. His elder brother Mario Sturzo (1 November 1861 – 11 November 1941) was a noted theologian and Bishop of Piazza Armerina. His two other sisters were Margherita and the nun Remigia (or Sister Giuseppina).

From 1883 until 1886, Sturzo studied at Acireale and then in Noto. He commenced his studies for the ecclesial life in 1888. Sturzo received his ordination to the priesthood on 19 May 1894 from the Bishop of Caltagirone Saverio Gerbino at the Chiesa del Santissimo Salvatore in Enna. Following his graduation, Sturzo served as a teacher of philosophical and theological studies in Caltagirone; he served as his town's Vice-Mayor from 1905 to 1920. In 1898, he received a doctorate in his philosophical studies from the Pontifical Gregorian University in Rome, and he taught that subject in his hometown from 1898 to 1903.

Sturzo in 1905

In the late 1890s and early 1900s, Sturzo came to know Giacomo Radini-Tedeschi. In his spare time, he liked to collect antique ceramic art; while serving as the Vice-Mayor, he opened a ceramicists' school in 1918. He also founded the newspaper La Croce di Constantino in Caltagirone in 1897. In 1900, at the same time as the Boxer Rebellion, Sturzo asked his bishop to serve in the missions in China despite the persecutions the Catholic Church was enduring there; he was denied this request on the account of his precarious state of health. Since 1915, Sturzo was involved with Azione Cattolica. He was also close with Romolo Murri. Sturzo's political activism and collaboration with his colleagues prevented Giovanni Giolitti assuming power once again in 1922; this allowed for Luigi Facta to assume the prime ministership.

== Italian Popular Party (1919–1924) ==
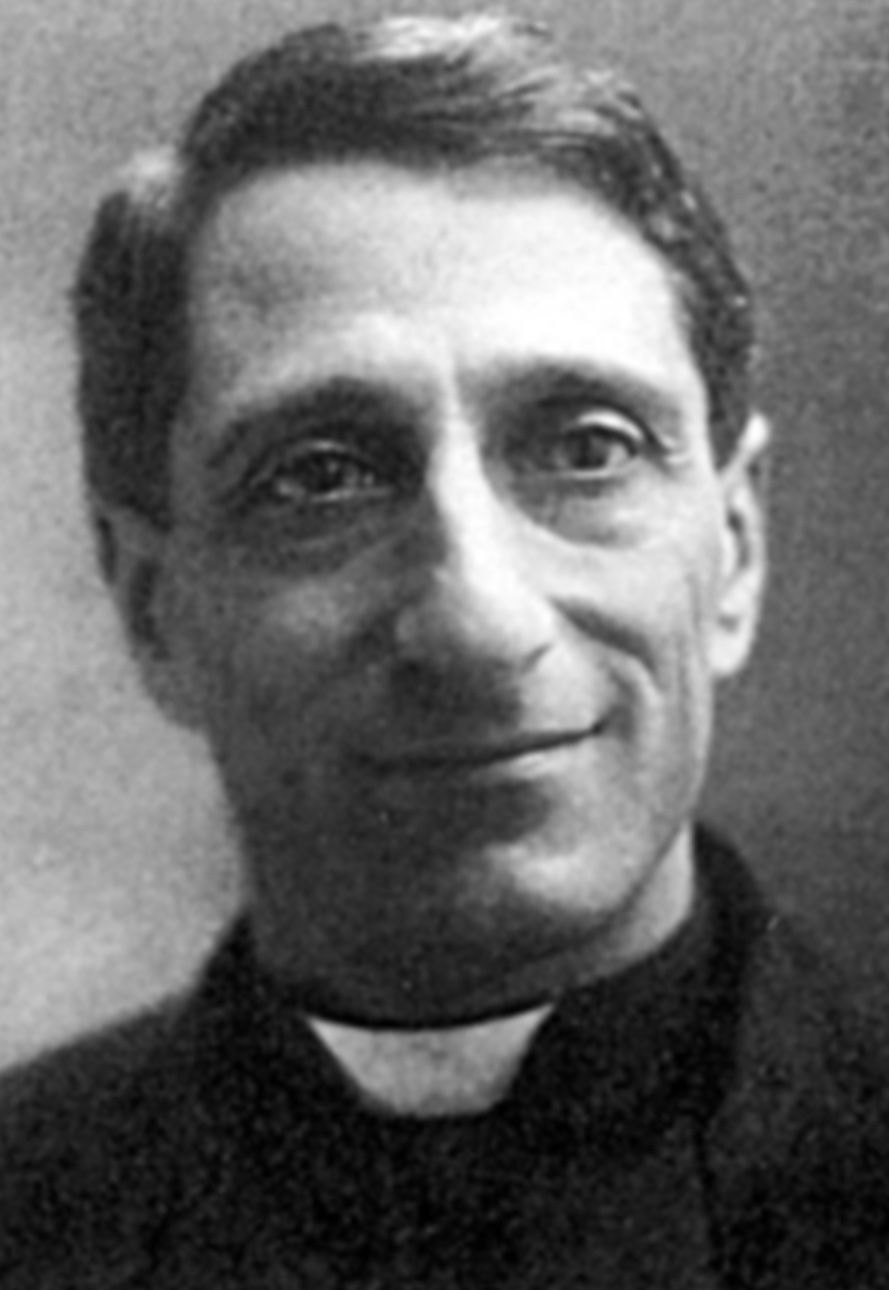
Sturzo in 1919

Sturzo was among the founders of the Italian People's Party (PPI) on 19 January 1919. The formation of the PPI, with the permission of Pope Benedict XV, represented a tacit and reluctant reversal of the Vatican's Non Expedit of non-participation in Italian politics, which was abolished before the 1919 Italian general election in which the PPI won 20.6% of the vote and 100 seats in the legislature. The PPI was a colossal political force in the nation; between 1919 and 1922, no government could be formed and maintained without the support of the PPI. A coalition between the Italian Socialist Party (PSI) and the PPI was deemed unacceptable within the Vatican, despite the fact Giolitti had proposed it as prime minister in 1914, and something his progressive and powerless successors—Ivanoe Bonomi (1921–1922) and Luigi Facta (1922)—reimaged as the single possible coalition that excluded the Italian fascists.

Sturzo was a committed anti-fascist who discussed the ways in which Catholicism and fascism were incompatible in such works as Coscienza cristiana and criticized what he perceived to be alleged clerical fascist elements within the Vatican. Sturzo also wrote about the thought of Saint Augustine of Hippo and Gottfried Wilhelm Leibniz, as well as Giambattista Vico and Maurice Blondel. He did this in order to elaborate on what he called the "dialectic of the concrete" and opposed this dialectic as a veer towards absolute idealism and scholastic realism.

The leadership of Sturzo was increasingly challenged within the party in 1923. The Party Congress in Turin of April 1923 reaffirmed the constitutional, centrist character of the party, taking an anti-fascist position that was supported amongst the party's rank-and-file. Turin Congress and its conclusions were met with hostility from Mussolini, who expelled PPI ministers from his government. According to Richard A. Webster, "The Blackshirt campaign of lawlessness and violence against Catholic organizations was redoubled, and Don Sturzo became the target of a vulgar Fascist press campaign of vilification." Once Mussolini started threatening reprisals against the whole clergy for the political opposition of Sturzo's party, Sturzo resigned as the party leader on 10 July 1923, following a consultation with the Holy See.

The stance of Pope Pius XI was ambiguous - according to Richard A. Webster, "there is no evidence that the Pontiff yielded so openly to Fascist coercion." Sturzo himself leaned towards resignation, aware that his position in the party was vulnerable - as a priest, he was forbidden from sitting in the parliament, and his political power was limited because of his priesthood. It was, therefore, arranged that a secular Catholic, Alcide De Gasperi, take over the leadership of the party. Sturzo remained active in the party until 1924 when Cardinal Gasparri himself arranged for his emigration to London after fascist pressures and physical threats against Sturzo escalated further.

== Exile (1924–1946) ==
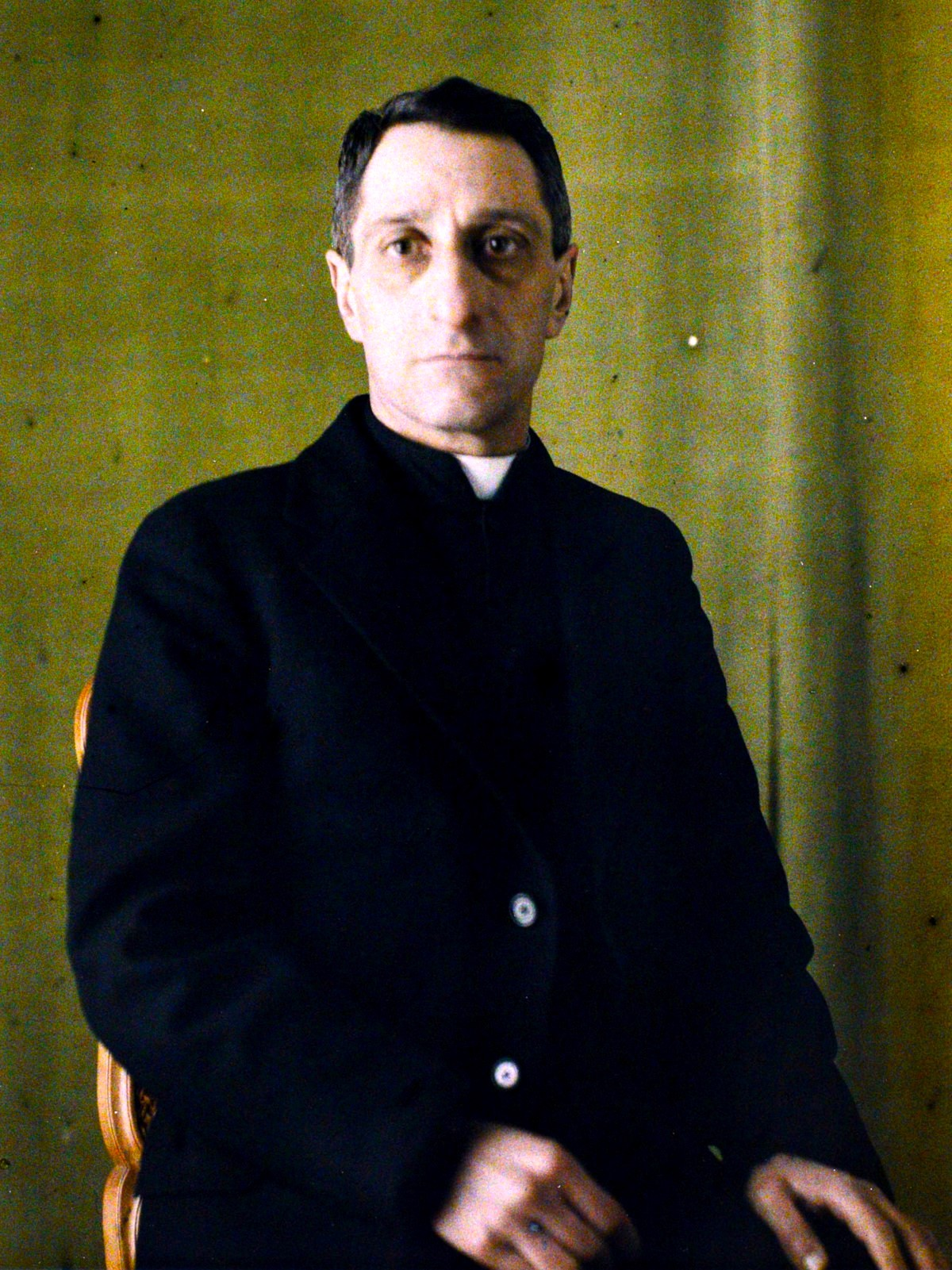
1925 Autochrome by Georges Chevalier

Sturzo was exiled from 1924 to 1946 first in London (1924–1940) and then in the United States (1940–1946). Sturzo left Rome for London on 25 October 1924. Sturzo was consigned to a three-month educational trip in London; the choice of London was perhaps intended to isolate Sturzo because he did not speak the language and it did not contain a large population of like-minded Catholics. He moved to the residence of the Oblates of Saint Charles in Bayswater and then in January 1925 to the Servites at their priory of Saint Mary in Fulham Road where he was asked to leave in 1926 because the Servites' motherhouse in Rome was being denied funds as long as Sturzo was their guest.

In 1926, Sturzo refused an offer from the Vatican that was communicated through Cardinal Francis Bourne to serve as a chaplain in a convent in Chiswick and lodging for his twin sister Nelina in exchange for ending his journalistic activism and issuing a "spontaneous declaration" that he was retired from politics in full. In November 1926, he moved into a flat at 213b Gloucester Terrace in Bayswater with his sister where the pair lived as lodgers until 1933. After the signing of the Lateran Treaty in 1929, he was offered an appointment as a Canon of Saint Peter's Basilica in Rome again in exchange for his permanent renunciation of politics.

On 22 September 1940, Sturzo boarded the Samaria in Liverpool bound for New York hoping for an academic appointment and arrived there on 3 October 1940. He was instead sent to Saint Vincent's Hospital in Jacksonville, Florida, which was filled with priests who were ill and about to die. Beginning in 1941, he cooperated with agents from the British Security Co-Ordination, as well as the Office of Strategic Services and the Office of War Information, providing them with his assessments of the political forces with the Italian resistance movement and radio broadcasts to the Italian peninsula. Sturzo returned to Brooklyn in April 1944 but his return to his homeland received a Vatican and Alcide De Gasperi veto in October 1945 and May 1946.

== Return, last years, and death (1946–1959) ==
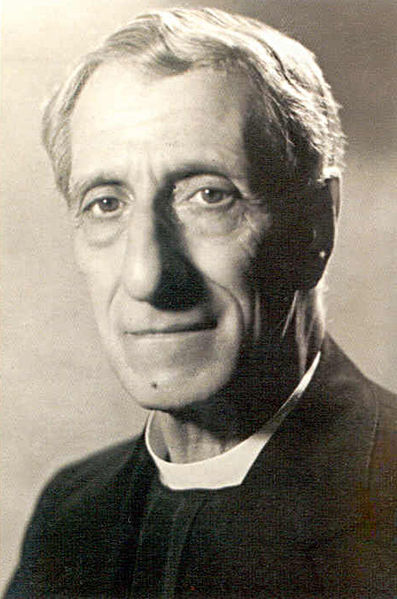
Sturzo in the 1950s

Sturzo set off to return to his homeland on the Vulcania on 27 August 1946 (after the 1946 Italian institutional referendum had abolished the need for a monarch) but did not have a dominant role in Italian politics after his arrival on 6 September 1946 in Naples. He instead retired to the outskirts of Rome after landing in Naples. In 1951, he founded the Luigi Sturzo Institute, which was designed to endorse research in historical science, as well as in economics and politics. He was made a member of the Senate of the Republic on 17 December 1952 and senator for life in 1953 at the behest of the then Italian president Luigi Einaudi and he obtained a dispensation from Pope Pius XII in order to accept the title.

On 23 July 1959, Sturzo celebrated Mass. When he came to the consecration of the Eucharist, he looked down and slumped. He was carried to his bed still in his vestments and his health took a sharp decline until his death. Sturzo died in Rome in the afternoon of 8 August 1959 at the general house of the Canossians; his remains were interred in the church of San Lorenzo al Verano but were transferred in 1962 to the church of Santissimo Salvatore in Caltagirone.

== Beatification cause ==
The beatification process for Sturzo opened under Pope John Paul II on 23 March 2002 after the Congregation for the Causes of Saints issued the official nihil obstat decree and titled the priest as a Servant of God. Cardinal Camillo Ruini inaugurated the diocesan process of investigation on 3 May 2002; the postulator for this cause is the lawyer Carlo Fusco. The diocesan process concluded on 24 November 2017 in the Lateran Palace.

== Authorship ==
Sturzo was the author of several works in relation to philosophical and political thought. This included:

- Church and State (1939)
- The True Life (1943)
- The Inner Laws of Society (1944)
- Spiritual Problems of Our Times (1945)
- Italy and the Coming World (1945)

=== Articles ===
- "The Totalitarian State" (1936). Social Research. 3 (2): 222–235.
- "Sociology of the Supernatural" (1942). The American Catholic Sociological Review. 3 (4): 204–214.
- "Italian Problems in War and Peace" (1943). The Review of Politics. 5 (1): 55–81.
- "The Roman Question before and after Fascism" (1943). The Review of Politics. 5 (4): 488–508.
- "The Vatican’s Position in Europe" (1945). Foreign Affairs. 23 (2): 211–221.
- "Alcide De Gasperi, Prime Minister" (1946). Blackfriars. 27 (312): 87–89.
- "The Philosophic Background of Christian Democracy" (1947). The Review of Politics. 9 (1): 3–15.

== Bibliography ==
- De Grand, Alexander (1982). Italian Fascism: Its Origins & Development. Lincoln: University of Nebraska Press.
- Delzell, Charles F. (1980). "The Emergence of Political Catholicism in Italy: Partito Popolare, 1919–1926". Journal of Church and State. 22 (3): 543–546.
- Farrell-Vinay, Giovanna (2004). "The London Exile of Don Luigi Sturzo (1924–1940)". HeyJ. XLV. pp. 158–177.
- Molony, John N. (1977). The Emergence of Political Catholicism in Italy: Partito Popolare 1919–1926.
- Moos, Malcolm (1945). "Don Luigi Sturzo—Christian Democrat". The American Political Science Review. 39 (2): 269–292.
- Murphy, Francis J. (1981) "Don Sturzo and the Triumph of Christian Democracy". Italian Americana. 7 (1): 89–98.
- Pugliese, Stanislao G. (2001). Italian Fascism and Anti-Fascism: A Critical Anthology. Manchester: Manchester University Press.
- Riccards, Michael P. (1998). Vicars of Christ: Popes, Power, and Politics in the Modern World. New York: Herder & Herder.
- Schäfer, Michael (2004). "Luigi Sturzo as a Theorist of Totalitarianism". Totalitarianism and Political Religions. 1. London: Routledge. 39–57.
- Sturzo, Luigi (1939). Church and state. New York: Longmans, Green and Co.
