= Garibaldi Theatre (Piazza Armerina) =

Coordinates: 37°23′N 14°22′E

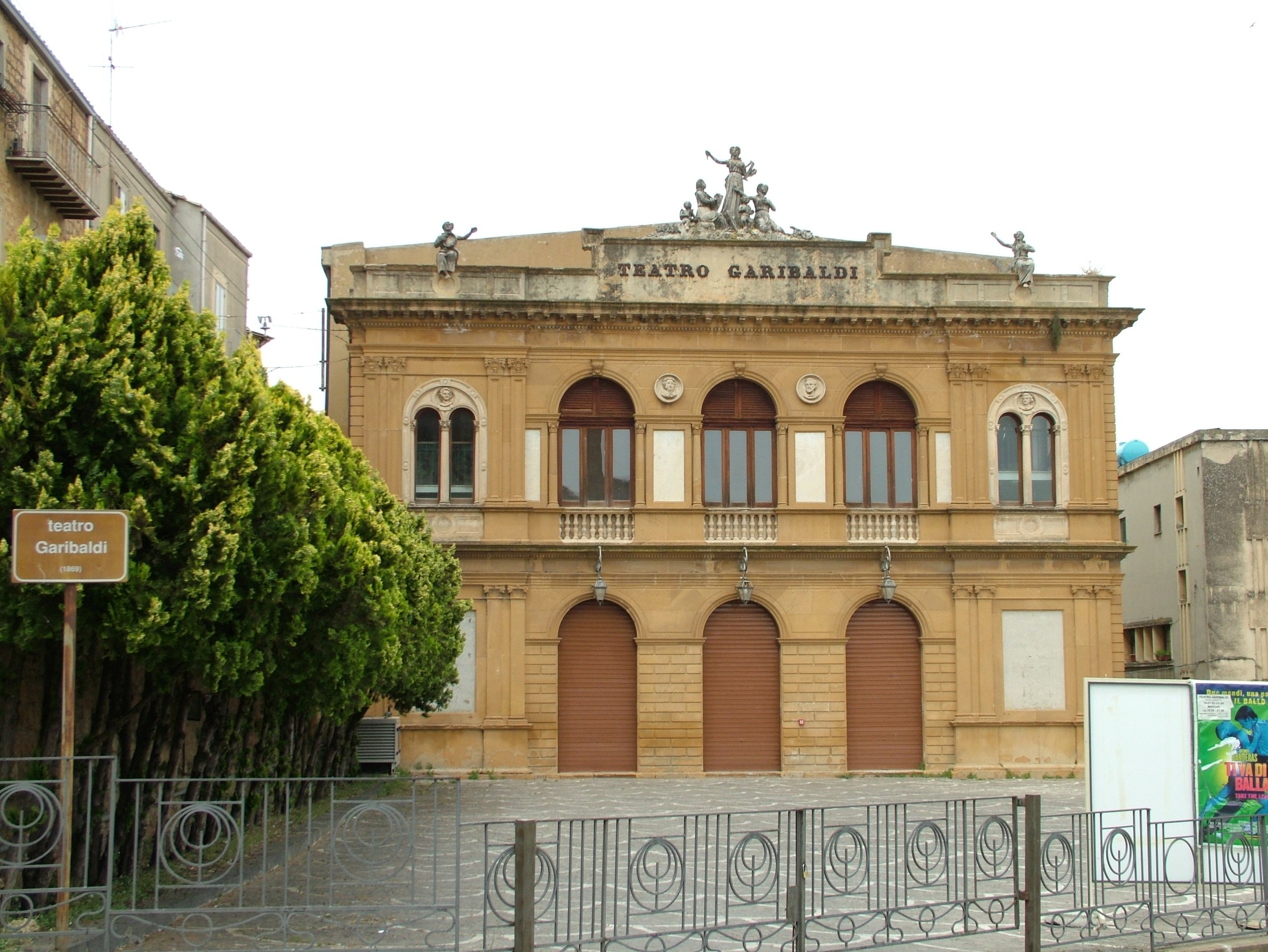
The Garibaldi Theatre

The Garibaldi Theatre is a theatre in Piazza Armerina, Sicily, southern Italy.

The theatre was built to the east of the town, close to the 14th century wall, opposite the church of St. Stephen. The exact date of construction is unknown, due to the destruction of pre-unification municipal records, but is thought to be about 1800. Following the collapse of the city walls in 1852 and the resulting damage to the theatre's façade, Giovanni Pastorelli rebuilt the façade in a Renaissance style in 1902. It can house a total of 320 spectators. It is also operated as a cinema. The theatre is now licensed as a venue for civil weddings.
