= Castel di Iudica =

- Comune
- Comune di Castel di Judica
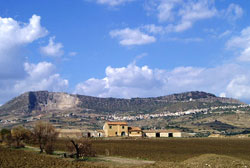

- Location within Italy Location within Sicily
- Coordinates: 37°30′N 14°39′E
- Country: Italy
- Region: Sicily
- Metropolitan city: Catania (CT)
- Frazioni: Borgo Franchetto, Carrubbo, Cinquegrana, Giumarra

Government
  - Mayor: Ruggero Agatino Strano

Area
  - Total: 103.21 km^{2} (39.85 sq mi)
- Elevation: 475 m (1,558 ft)

Population (31 May 2017)
  - Total: 4,530
  - Density: 43.9/km^{2} (114/sq mi)
- Demonym: Iudicenzi
- Time zone: UTC+1 (CET)
  - Summer (DST): UTC+2 (CEST)
- Postal code: 95040
- Dialing code: 095
- Website: www.comune.casteldiiudica.ct.it

Castel di Iudica (Sicilian: Castel di Jùdica) is a comune (municipality) in the Metropolitan City of Catania in the Italian region Sicily, located about 130 kilometres (81 mi) southeast of Palermo and about 35 kilometres (22 mi) west of Catania.

Castel di Judica borders the following municipalities: Agira, Catenanuova, Centuripe, Paternò, Ramacca.

== History ==
On the nearby Mount Iudica, there are traces of an ancient settlement (8th–3rd century BC), while on Mount Turcisi are found the remains of a phrourion.

Under Islamic rule, it was called "Zotica" and was home to a castle, which was conquered by Roger I of Sicily around 1076, according to the account of the Norman chronicler Goffredo Malaterra, and was given to the city of Caltagirone. According to Arab geographer al-Idrisi, it was a thriving agricultural village in the early 12th century.

At the mountain's summit, a small church dedicated to Michael the Archangel was built in the 17th century, of which only the bell tower ("Campanaro") remains today.

Between 1816 and 1819, it became a hamlet of the comune of Ramacca under the name Giardinelli. In 1934, it became an autonomous municipality and took its current name in memory of the castle that had stood on Mount Iudica.

Since 2022, the city has been part of the project for the First World Park of Mediterranean Lifestyle along with 103 other cities in central Sicily.

== Folklore ==
A part of the summit of Mount Iudica is known as "u Sautu 'â Vecchia" ("the Jump of the Old Woman"), derived from a legendary episode. During the Norman conquest, it is said that a young woman named Emidia disguised herself as an old woman to deceive the Saracens but was thrown into a ravine by them. However, this act allowed the Normans to conquer the castle.

Since 2005, the episode has been commemorated in an event organized by the municipality and performed at the theater under the title "Angels Over the Sky of Iudica," written and directed by Fabio Cocimano.
