= Francesco La Rocca =

Member of the Sicilian Mafia

- Born: 1938; San Michele di Ganzaria, Sicily, Kingdom of Italy
- Died: 22 December 2020 (aged 82); Bari, Apulia, Italy
- Other name: "Ciccio" La Rocca
- Occupation: Mafia boss
- Known for: Head of the Caltagirone Mafia family
- Allegiance: Caltagirone Mafia family / Cosa Nostra

Francesco "Ciccio" La Rocca (1938 – 22 December 2020) was a notorious Sicilian mafioso and the first capo of the Caltagirone Mafia family, known for his brutal methods, strategic mediation between mafia factions, and influential role in regional criminal and political affairs.

== History ==
Born in 1938 in San Michele di Ganzaria, in the province of Catania, La Rocca's criminal career began in the 1950s, when he was initiated into the mafia at the age of 18 by Calogero Conti, then head of the Ramacca Mafia family. Initially assigned as a "soldato" in the Mazzarino Mafia family, which is part of the Riesi mandamento, his rise through the ranks was marked by strategic mediation, strict adherence to traditional Cosa Nostra codes, and a brutal reputation.

In 1982, after two decades within the Mazzarino Mafia, La Rocca established his own autonomous Mafia family in Caltagirone, closely aligned with the Catania Mafia family, headed by Benedetto Santapaola. Following a violent mafia war in 1998, he attempted to reorganize the fragmented factions of Enna, Agrigento, and Caltanissetta, reaffirming his leadership role with the support of his nephew, Gesualdo La Rocca.

Officially working as a livestock breeder, La Rocca operated in the agricultural heartlands of Sicily, though he was, in fact, a central figure in the mafia's power dynamics. Known as "the patriarch" and "the great mediator," he played a key role in bridging relationships between the Catania Mafia family and mafia families of Palermo, maintaining close ties with the Corleonesi faction led by Totò Riina. He was also reported to have sheltered fugitive mafia boss Bernardo Provenzano during the latter's period in hiding.

La Rocca was notorious for his ruthless methods. Testimonies from mafia informants, such as Antonino Calderone, depicted him as violently unrestrained during murders, preferring strangulation to avoid drawing attention. His loyalty to the archaic rituals and codes of Cosa Nostra was well known, and he served as a mentor to figures like Maurizio Di Gati, a former mafia boss of Agrigento turned informant. La Rocca’s influence was such that he even opposed Provenzano’s preferred candidates in internal mafia appointments, highlighting his significant sway over regional decisions.

Beyond criminal activities, La Rocca also involved himself in local political influence. In a wiretapped conversation with Sebastiano Rampulla, brother of a known bomb-maker involved in the assassination of Judge Giovanni Falcone, La Rocca directed electoral support, specifically favoring candidates aligned with the center-right "Polo" coalition while excluding others. He was allegedly linked by informants to former Sicilian Governor Raffaele Lombardo, though such claims were denied by Lombardo’s legal defence.

La Rocca's family was also entrenched in the mafia network. His son, Francesco Gioacchino, and his nephew, Gesualdo, both held roles within the organization, with the latter receiving a life sentence for mafia-related crimes.

In his final years, La Rocca suffered from serious health conditions. After a period of incarceration in the Opera prison, he was granted house arrest in his hometown for medical reasons. This measure was later revoked, leading to his transfer to the Cannizzaro Hospital in Catania and subsequently to Bari prison, which had internal medical facilities. In the final month of his life, his condition worsened, and he was transferred to the Policlinico of Bari under custodial detention. Francesco La Rocca died on 22 December 2020, at the age of 82.
