= Luigi Sturzo Institute =

Research institute in Rome, Italy

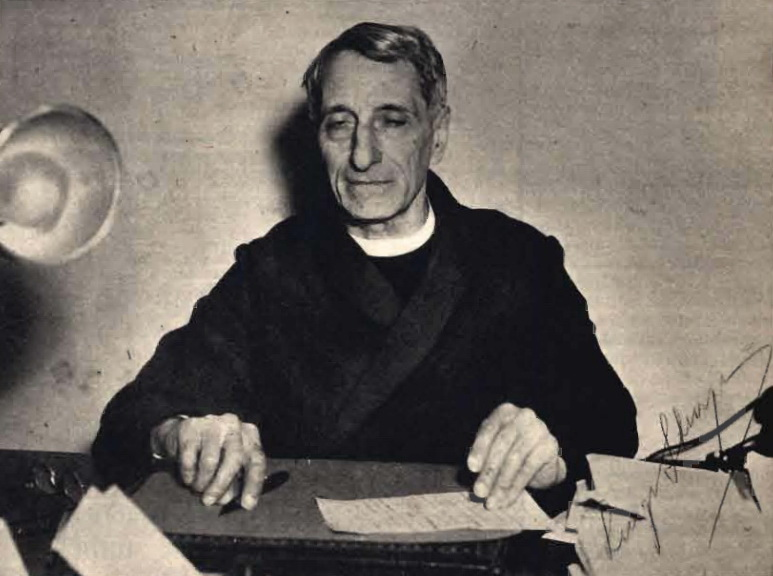
1950 photograph of Luigi Sturzo

The Luigi Sturzo Institute (Italian: Istituto Luigi Sturzo, ILS) was founded in 1951 by Luigi Sturzo of the Partito Popolare (Italian Popular Party). The mission of the Luigi Sturzo Institute is to endorse research in the historical sciences, sociology, political and economic fields by providing vast documentation in the archive library, facilitate canvassers, issue publications and maintain various alliances with other national and international institutes.

Located in Palazzo Baldassini, the institute’s remarkable building was constructed by architect Antonio da Sangallo il Giovane in 1515. The interior walls are decorated with frescos from various artists including several who attended La Scuola di Raffaelo.

Within the edifice, the institute organizes and preserves archives containing documentation specified around the validation of the Roman Catholic Movement. In the library, other documentation is assembled, more specifically around the social sciences as well as modern and contemporary history.

Ongoing research in the institute extends to the fields of psychology, politics, history, jurisprudence and economics. The conducted research is integrated with seminars organized by the institute to share the new information and provide information in areas of interest.

The formation sector provides courses for graduates that teach the work specifics of several jobs in the cultural organization career based on the common European model.

The diffusion and verifications of scientific results are dispersed predominantly by several publications, one of which is the journal Sociologia, published every four months, which discusses historical and social sciences.

The institute develops numerous of its activities in collaboration with other national and international institutes.
