= Ramacca =

- Comune
- Comune di Ramacca
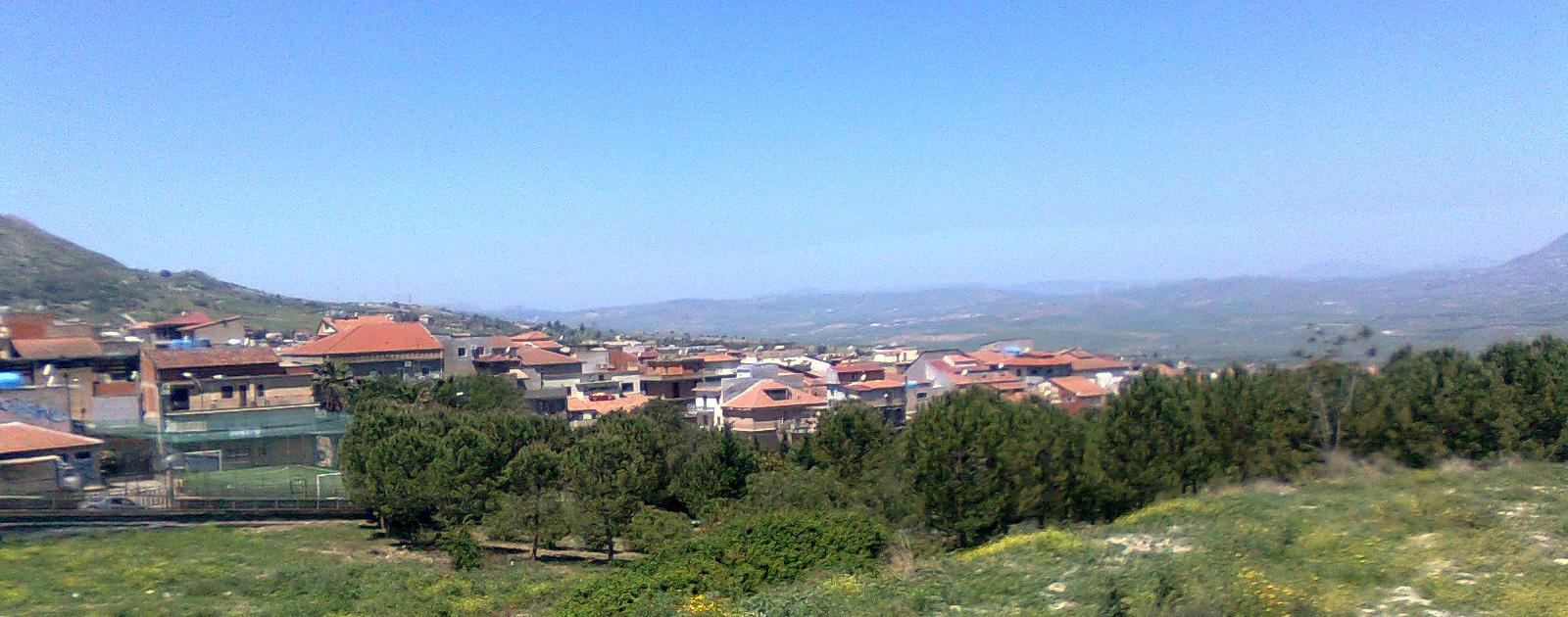

- Location within Italy Location within Sicily
- Coordinates: 37°23′N 14°42′E
- Country: Italy
- Region: Sicily
- Metropolitan city: Catania (CT)
- Frazioni: Libertinia

Government
  - Mayor: Giuseppe Limoli

Area
  - Total: 306.44 km^{2} (118.32 sq mi)
- Elevation: 270 m (890 ft)

Population (31 March 2018)
  - Total: 10,854
  - Density: 35.420/km^{2} (91.736/sq mi)
- Demonym: Ramacchesi
- Time zone: UTC+1 (CET)
  - Summer (DST): UTC+2 (CEST)
- Postal code: 95040
- Dialing code: 095
- Website: www.comune.ramacca.ct-egov.it

Ramacca (Italian pronunciation: [raˈmakka]) is a comune (municipality) in a mountainous area in the Metropolitan City of Catania in the Italian region of Sicily, located about 140 kilometres (87 mi) southeast of Palermo and about 35 kilometres (22 mi) southwest of Catania. It lies west of the Plain of Catania. Ramacca borders the following municipalities: Agira, Aidone, Assoro, Belpasso, Castel di Judica, Lentini, Mineo, Palagonia, Paternò, Raddusa.

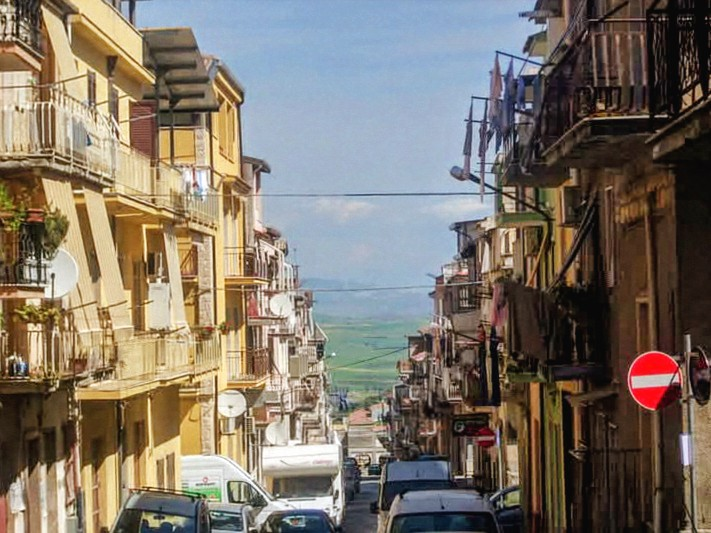
A street in Ramacca

Its name derives from the Arabic Rahal Mohac, which means Hamlet of Mohac.

Ramacca is home to the Sagra del Carciofo, an artichoke festival held every April. The city's economy is largely based on the cultivation of artichokes.
