= Caltagirone Mafia family =

Crime family of the Sicilian mafia

- Founded: 1982
- Founder: Francesco La Rocca
- Founding location: Caltagirone, Sicily
- Years active: 1982–present
- Territory: Caltagirone, San Michele di Ganzaria, Grammichele, Militello, Licodia Eubea and Vizzini.
- Ethnicity: Sicilians
- Activities: extortion, political corruption, bid rigging
- Allies: Catania Mafia family Ramacca Mafia family Corleonesi Mafia clan

The Caltagirone Mafia family, also known as the La Rocca Mafia clan, is a crime family of the Cosa Nostra based in the town of Caltagirone, Sicily. Founded in the early 1980s by Francesco "Ciccio" La Rocca, the Mafia clan rose to prominence through its involvement in various illicit activities, including extortion, drug trafficking, and political manipulation.

== History ==
Until the early 1980s, criminal control over the city of Caltagirone and the surrounding area was exercised by the Catania Mafia family. However, the consolidation of a local criminal structure occurred in 1982, with Francesco "Ciccio" La Rocca, who succeeded in establishing an autonomous Mafia family rooted in the town of San Michele di Ganzaria, just outside Caltagirone. Francesco “Ciccio” La Rocca, born in 1938, became affiliated with Cosa Nostra in 1956 at the age of 18. From modest beginnings as a livestock farmer, he would rise to become an important Mafia boss. This move marked the beginning of local autonomy in the area's criminal governance and solidified his leadership over the Caltagirone territory. His alliances with powerful Cosa Nostra factions, particularly the Catania Mafia and the Corleonesi led by Totò Riina, further elevated the status of the Caltagirone Mafia clan within the Sicilian Mafia hierarchy.

Under La Rocca’s rule, the Caltagirone Mafia became deeply involved in extortion, control of public contracts, and political manipulation. The Mafia family maintained close relationships with various sectors of local governance and business, influencing public tenders and election outcomes. An example of this political entanglement was highlighted in conversations with Sebastiano Rampulla, in which La Rocca discussed vote allocations during national elections.

Despite longstanding loyalty to the Santapaola Mafia clan, a brief moment of internal dissent occurred during Ciccio’s imprisonment in the late 1990s. His nephew, Gesualdo La Rocca, supported an attempted coup by the rival Mazzei clan to displace the Santapaola leadership in Catania. Though ultimately unsuccessful, this episode demonstrated the shifting ambitions within the clan and temporarily strained inter-family alliances.

La Rocca was arrested and sentenced to life imprisonment following the 2004 Operation Dionisio, charged with multiple murders and Mafia association under Article 41-bis prison regime of the Italian Penal Code. Despite his incarceration, the family continued to exert influence in San Michele di Ganzaria, symbolized by a controversial 2016 religious procession in which the statue of the Dead Christ was deliberately redirected to stop in front of La Rocca’s home, an act widely interpreted as a public show of loyalty and control. Ciccio La Rocca died in 2020 at the age of 82 while under house arrest at a hospital in Bari. His death marked the end of an era, though questions linger about the enduring power of his network.

== Current status ==
After Ciccio La Rocca’s imprisonment and subsequent death, leadership of the Caltagirone Mafia passed to his son, Gioacchino Francesco “Gianfranco” La Rocca. Unlike his father, Gianfranco reportedly lacks the same degree of respect and authority. Nevertheless, he assumed control of the clan and became a central figure in the post-2016 reorganization of Mafia activity across the Caltagirone area.

This reorganization was the subject of Operation Agorà, launched in 2022, which exposed a vast criminal enterprise involving extortion, drug trafficking, auction rigging, and monopolistic control of public services, including funeral services and transportation. Gianfranco La Rocca and his associates were implicated in manipulating public tenders through collusion with municipal employees and businessmen, effectively cornering several local markets.

Despite internal rivalries and declining public reverence, the La Rocca family remains a recognized Mafia faction. The clan maintains ties with other criminal groups, including the Santapaola-Ercolano of Catania and the Nardo clan of Lentini. Disputes over economic interests, such as the management of cemetery services in Vizzini, have at times required mediation between factions, reaffirming the La Rocca family's role in the regional Mafia structure.

Although diminished compared to its peak under Ciccio La Rocca, the Caltagirone Mafia continues to operate, embedded within legitimate businesses and public institutions, adapting to new challenges while retaining its legacy of violence and territorial control.

== Leadership ==
- 1982–2020 — Francesco "Ciccio" La Rocca.
  - Acting c.2010s — Salvatore Seminara.
- 2020–present — Gioacchino "Gianfranco" Francesco La Rocca.
