= Piazza Armerina =

Piazza Armerina Chiazza (Sicilian) Ciazza (Gallo-Italic)
- Comune
- Città di Piazza Armerina
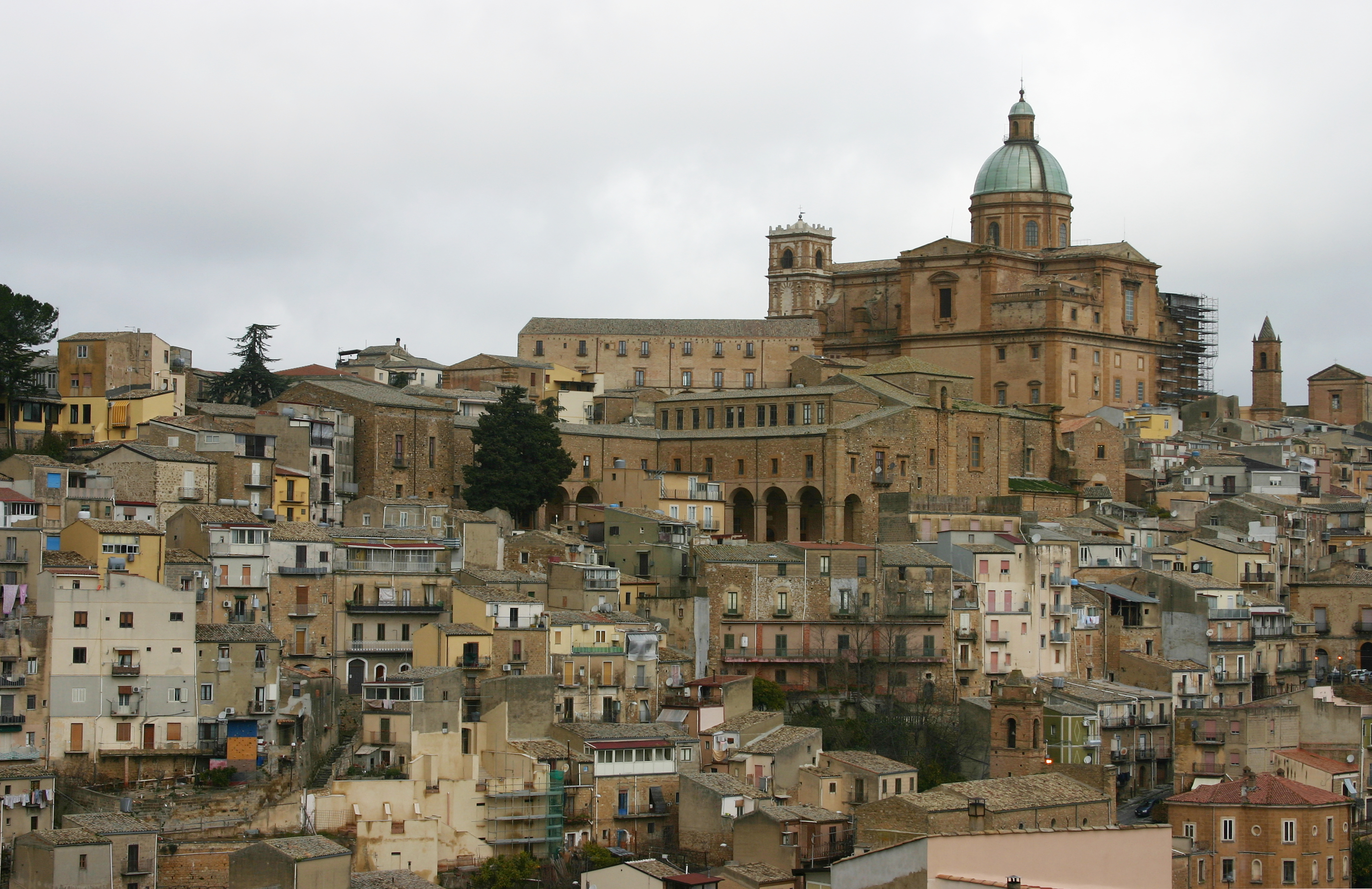
- View of Piazza Armerina

- Coat of arms

- Location within Italy Location within Sicily
- Coordinates: 37°23′N 14°22′E
- Country: Italy
- Region: Sicily
- Province: Enna (EN)
- Frazioni: Azzolina, Farrugio, Floristella, Grottacalda, Ileano, Polleri, Santa Croce, Serrafina

Government
  - Mayor: Nino Cammarata

Area
  - Total: 304.54 km^{2} (117.58 sq mi)
- Elevation: 697 m (2,287 ft)

Population (2026)
  - Total: 20,558
  - Density: 67.505/km^{2} (174.84/sq mi)
- Demonym: Piazzesi
- Time zone: UTC+1 (CET)
  - Summer (DST): UTC+2 (CEST)
- Postal code: 94015
- Dialing code: 0935
- Patron saint: Maria Santissima della Vittoria
- Saint day: August 15
- Website: Official website

Piazza Armerina (Sicilian: Chiazza; Gallo-Italic: Ciazza) is a town and comune (municipality) in the Province of Enna of the autonomous island region of Sicily in southern Italy, located about 21 kilometres (13 mi) northeast of Enna and 120 kilometres (75 mi) southeast of Palermo. It has 20,558 inhabitants.

Piazza Armerina borders the municipalities of Aidone, Assoro, Barrafranca, Caltagirone, Enna, Mazzarino, Mirabella Imbaccari, Pietraperzia, Raddusa, San Cono, San Michele di Ganzaria, Mineo, and Valguarnera Caropepe.

== History ==
The city of Piazza (as it was called before 1862) developed during the Norman domination in Sicily (11th century), when Lombards settled the central and eastern part of Sicily.

The area has been inhabited since prehistoric times. The city flourished during Roman times, as shown by the large mosaics at the patrician Villa Romana del Casale.

Remains, artefacts of old settlements and a necropolis from the 8th century BC were found in the territory of the commune.

Boris Giuliano (1930–1979) was born in Piazza Armerina.

== Demographics ==
As of 2026, the population is 20,558, of which 49.7% are males, and 50.3% are females. Minors make up 13.9% of the population, and seniors make up 25.1%.

Historical population

Year	Pop.	±%
1861	21,716	—
1871	18,279	−15.8%
1881	19,286	+5.5%
1901	24,119	+25.1%
1911	32,427	+34.4%
1921	38,080	+17.4%
1931	25,826	−32.2%
1936	24,527	−5.0%

Year	Pop.	±%
1951	26,739	+9.0%
1961	24,887	−6.9%
1971	22,134	−11.1%
1981	21,019	−5.0%
1991	22,355	+6.4%
2001	21,038	−5.9%
2011	22,196	+5.5%
2021	20,733	−6.6%

Source: ISTAT

=== Immigration ===
As of 2025, immigrants make up 9.4% of the population. The 5 largest foreign countries of birth are Romania, Germany, Somalia, Belgium, and Morocco.

== Main sights ==
Villa Romana del Casale
UNESCO World Heritage Site
- Interactive map of Villa Romana del Casale
- Criteria: Cultural: i, ii, iii
- Reference: 832
- Inscription: 1997 (21st Session)
- Area: 3.5 ha (8.6 acres)
- Buffer zone: 200 ha (490 acres)

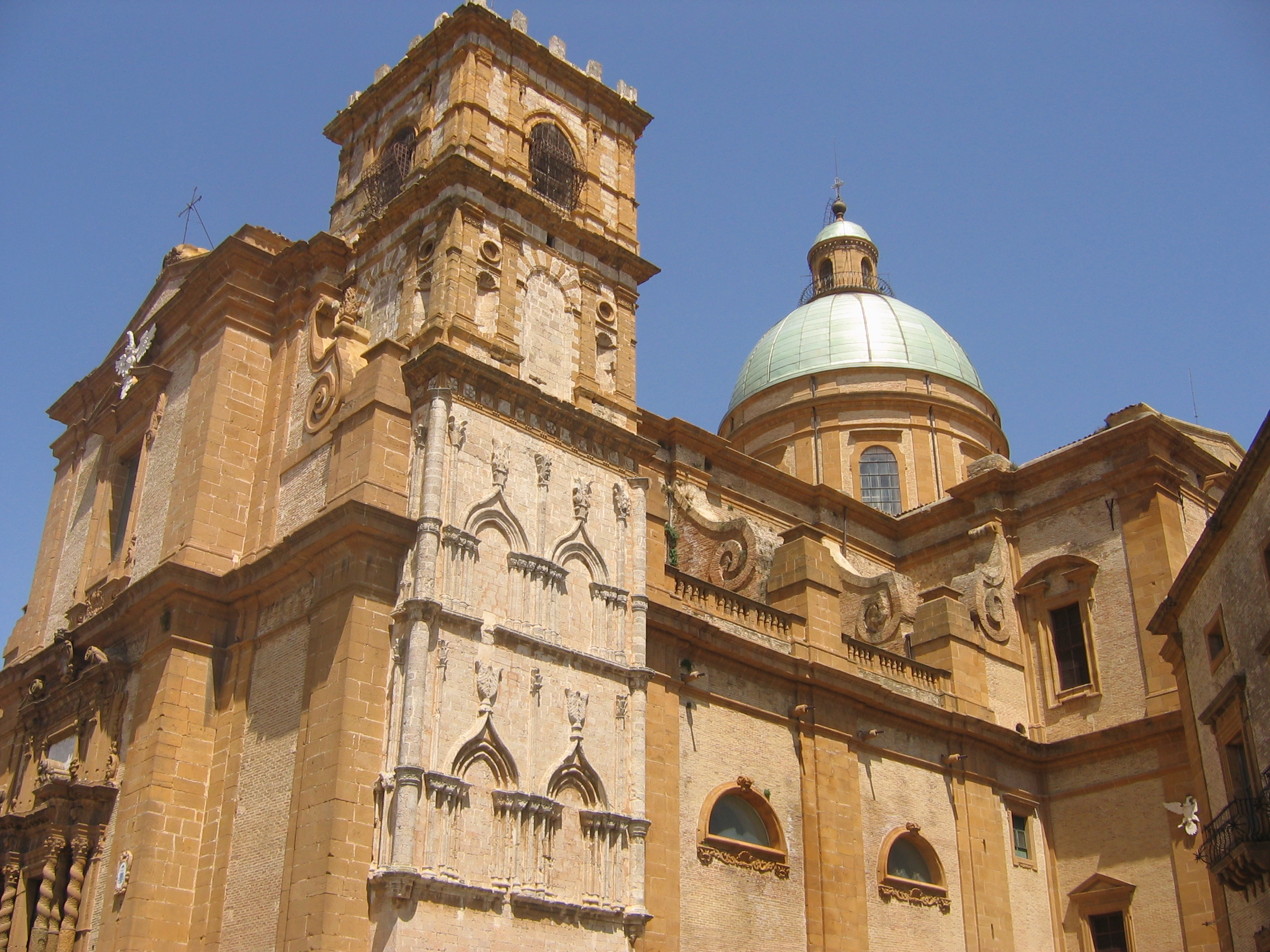
Cathedral of Piazza Armerina.

The town is famous chiefly for its monumental Roman villa with its exceptional mosaics in the Villa Romana del Casale, about 3 kilometres (2 miles) to the southwest.

It also has a range of significant architecture dating from medieval through the 18th century. The medieval history of the city is manifest in some of its houses, which show Norman or Gothic architecture. The main landmarks include a range of architectural styles:

- Piazza Armerina Cathedral: church was built atop the 15th-century foundations of a former church, from which the bell tower was taken and reused; completed during 17th and 18th centuries. Also original to the 15th-century church are the Catalan-Gothic style windows on the left side. The dome dates from 1768. The façade has a notable portal with spiral columns by Leonardo De Luca. The interior, with a single large nave, houses the Madonna della Vittoria (Madonna of the Victory). The Byzantine icon is traditionally associated with the banner donated by the Pope to Roger I of Sicily during the Council of Melfi. The cathedral has an unusual two-sided crucifix by an unknown artist. The Diocesan Museum holds reliquaries, articles of silverware, monstrances and other religious art works.
- Palazzo Trigona: palace of the wealthy family who commissioned the nearby cathedrachurch.
- San Rocco: church of Fundrò with a carved tufa portal.
- Palazzo di Città (1613), characterized by a fresco ceiling by Salvatore Martorana.
- Aragonese Castle (1392–96). It is square in shape, with square towers.
- San Giovanni Evangelista: 14th-century church with interior frescoes by Guglielmo Borremans and assistants.
- Sant'Anna: 18th century church with Baroque sinuous façade inspired by the buildings of Borromini.
- The church of St. Martin of Tours: church completed in 1163.
- Santa Maria di Gesù: 16th century church now abandoned.
- Garibaldi Theatre.
- Commenda Dei Cavalieri Di Malta (1150) Old Church, run by the Knights of Malta from 1150, now a national monument, at Piazza Umberto 1.

Outside the city is the ancient church of the Priorato di Sant'Andrea (1096), founded by Count Simon of Butera, a nephew of Roger I of Sicily. It has important medieval frescoes.

== Culture ==
Piazza Armerina holds an annual Palio dei Normanni, a re-enactment in costume of the entrance of the Norman Count Roger I to the city. It takes place on 12–14 August.

=== Languages ===
Piazza Armerina is one of the so-called "Lombard" communes of Sicily, as its dialect differs notably from that of the neighbouring region. This is due to the destruction of the old Piazza by king William I of Sicily, and the subsequent repopulation by William II (according to other scholars, during the slightly later age of Frederick II) with colonists coming from northern Italy (then collectively called "Lombardy"), especially from Monferrato and Piacenza.

== Sources ==
- La Rosa, Ugo (1993). Sicily and Its Islands.
