= Diocese of Piazza Armerina =

Roman Catholic diocese in Italy

Coordinates: 37°22′N 14°22′E

Diocese of Piazza Armerina Dioecesis Platiensis

Catholic
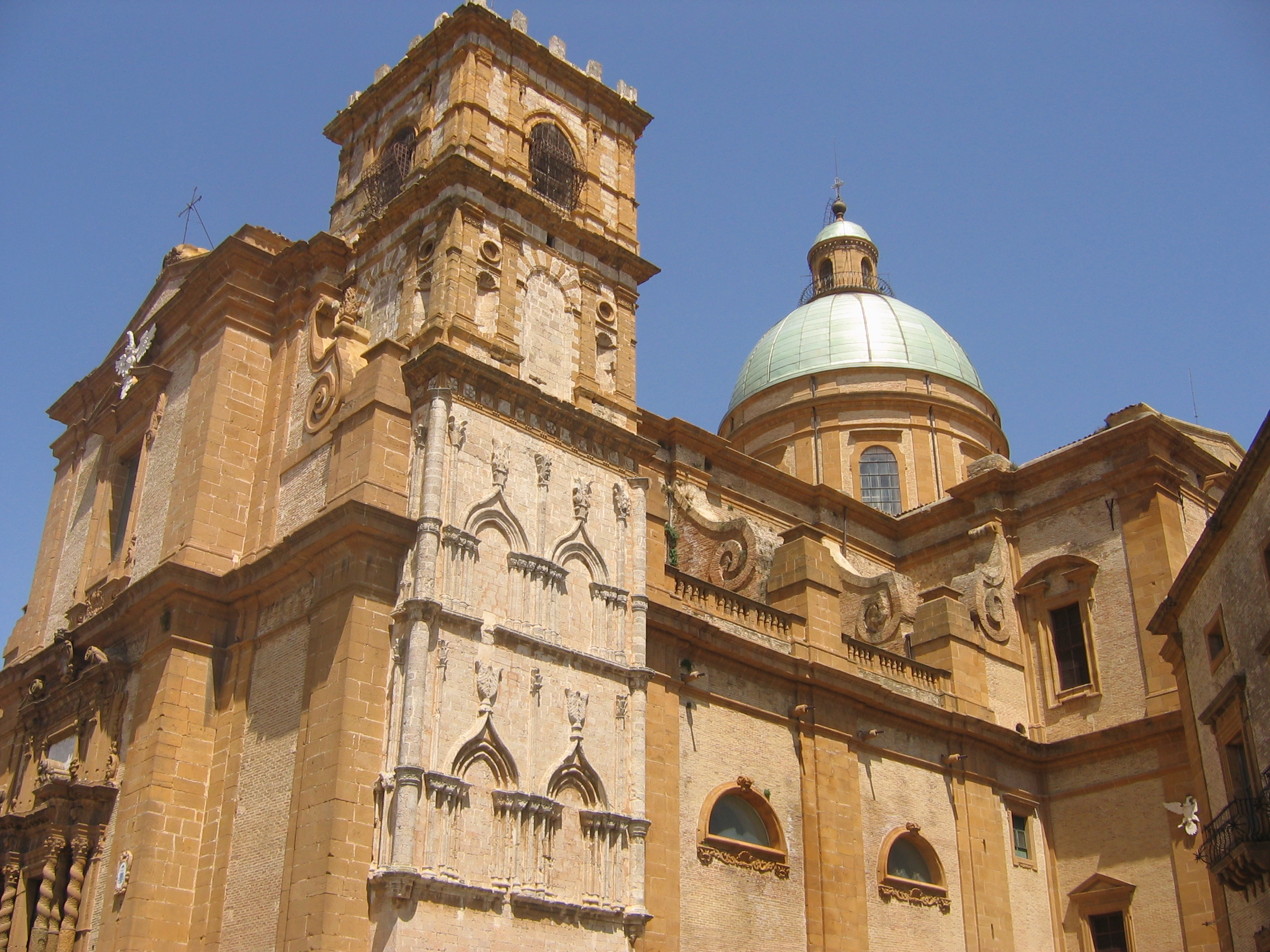
- Cathedral in Piazza Armerina

Location
- Country: Italy
- Ecclesiastical province: Agrigento

Statistics
- Area: 2,003 km^{2} (773 sq mi)
- Population: Total; Catholics: (as of 2023); 208,539 ▼; 203,000 (est.) ▼ (96.4%)
- Parishes: 75

Information
- Denomination: Catholic Church
- Rite: Roman Rite
- Established: 3 July 1817 (209 years ago)
- Cathedral: Cattedrale di Maria SS. delle Vittorie
- Secular priests: 86 (diocesan) ▼24 (Religious Orders) ▼14 Permanent Deacons

Current leadership
- Pope: Leo XIV
- Bishop: Rosario Gisana

Map
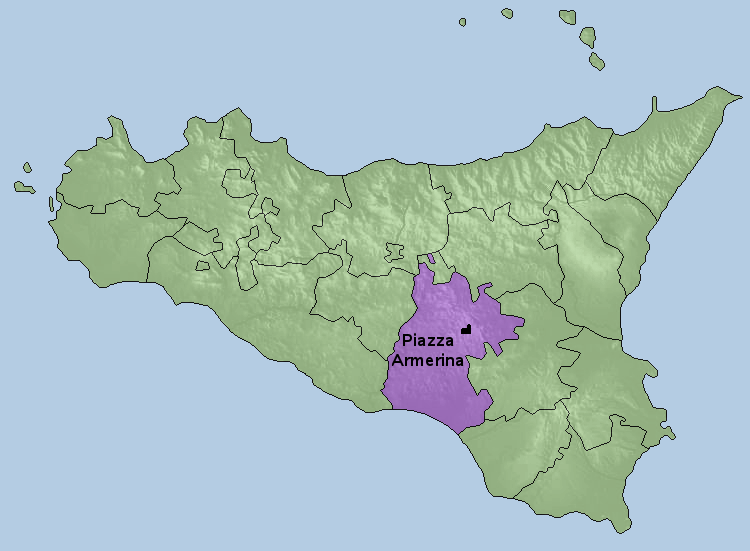

Website
- www.diocesipiazza.it

The Diocese of Piazza Armerina (Latin: Dioecesis Platiensis) is a Latin Church diocese of the Catholic Church in Sicily. It is a suffragan of the archdiocese of Agrigento.

== History ==
The town of Piazza was destroyed in 1166, at the command of King William I of Sicily, due to the rebellious character of its nobles and citizens. It was rebuilt by order of King William II of Sicily (1166–1189). He ordered the building of churches, the most impressive of which was dedicated to the Assumption of Mary, which became a collegiate church under Pope Clement VIII in 1603. The Chapter had four dignities (Provost, Cantor, Treasurer, and Dean) and twenty-four Canons. The collegiate church was also the city's parish church, and the Provost had the "cure of souls".

Since the second half of the 17th century, there had been a Jesuit college in Piazza. The great earthquake of 1693 ruined both the Jesuit college and its church, though the damages were repaired. The college was forced to close when the Jesuits were expelled from the kingdom in 1778.

The establishment of a diocese at Piazza Armerina, located in central Sicily, emerged as part of a broader early 19th-century reform to enhance pastoral care in the region. There were only nine bishops in the entire island of Sicily in 1805, all of whom were overburdened by growing population and difficulties of travel. After persistent appeals to King Ferdinand IV in 1805, Pope Pius VII commissioned an inquiry, and by 1808 local civic leaders had already pledged financial support and provided a residence and seminary for the future bishop of the Diocese of Piazza Armerina. In 1809, Pope Pius VII was arrested and deported, along with the curial cardinals, while the Papal States were annexed to the French state. During his captivity in France and in Savona from 1809 to 1814, the pope refused to carry out any functions whatever, and plans for the ecclesiastical development of Sicily were halted. The territory of Piazza Armerina was still only a part of the diocese of Siracusa.

=== Establishment of the diocese ===
The diocese was formally established on 3 July 1817 by Pope Pius VII, with the bull "Pervetustam locorum". Territory for the new diocese was taken from territory of the Diocese of Catania. The new diocese was assigned to the ecclesiastical Province of Monreale.

The college of Canons of Santa Maria Assunta was abolished, and the church was raised to the status of a cathedral. The canons of the college were then appointed canons of the cathedral Chapter, with the same three dignities, to which the pope added a fourth, the Archdeacon.

On 16 February 1962, the cathedral of Santa Maria della Vittoria was given the honor of being named a minor basilica by Pope John XXIII.

The first bishop, Girolamo Aprile e Benso, a native of Caltagirone, was appointed on 2 October 1818, and was consecrated a bishop on 17 January 1819. He appointed the archdeacon of the cathedral, Vincenzo Velardita, his vicar-general, and, in 1824, at the age of 65, he requested that Velardita be made a bishop to serve as a coadjutor in his responsibilities. Velardita became titular bishop of Gortyn (Crete) and auxiliary bishop of Piazza.

==== Changes in metropolitan ====
On 20 May 1844, Pope Gregory XVI issued a bull entitled "In Suprema", which reorganized the diocesan boundaries of Sicily. In the bull, to relieve the excessive population and size of the diocese of Syracuse, several communes (such as Assoro, San Filippo d’Agira, Leonforte, and Nissoria) were reassigned to the Diocese of Nicosia, while others (Mirabella Imbaccari, Raddusa) were transferred to Caltagirone. At the same time, new areas (Butera, Gela, Mazzarino, Niscemi, and Riesi) were added to the Diocese of Piazza Armerina. The diocese became a suffragan of the newly created Archdiocese of Siracusa.

The diocesan seminary for priestly formation opened in Piazza Armerina in 1859. Bishop Gerbino transformed the church of Saint Dominic into a residence for the seminarians in 1887. In 2025, it had ten seminarians.

In World War I, 270 soldiers from Piazza died.

Bishop Antonino Catarella (1942–1970) suppressed all the confraternities in the diocese on the grounds of internal struggles and strife with the clergy. During World War II, Bishop Catarella and the other bishops of Sicily prepared and disseminated plans to declare Sicily an independent state from the Kingdom of Italy.

An administrative reorganization of the dioceses of Sicily occurred on 2 December 2000, when the diocese of Piazza Armerina was removed from the province of Siracusa to become suffragan to the newly elevated Archdiocese of Agrigento.

== Bishops ==
- (1818 – 1836) : Girolamo Aprile e Benso
- (1838 – 1840) : Pietro Naselli, C.O.
- (1844 – 1845) : Pier Francesco Brunaccini, O.S.B.
- (1846 – 1867) : Cesare Agostino Sajeva
- (1872 – 1887) : Saverio Gerbino
- (1887 – 1903) : Mariano Palermo
- (1903 – 1941) : Mario Sturzo
- (1942 – 1970) : Antonino Catarella
- (18 Nov 1970 – 1986) : Sebastiano Rosso
- (8 Jan 1986 – 12 Feb 2002 Died) : Vincenzo Cirrincione
- (2002 – 2013) : Michele Pennisi
- (2014 – ) : Rosario Gisana

== Bibliography ==
- Cappelletti, Giuseppe (1870). Le chiese d'Italia dalla loro origine sino ai nostri giorni (in Italian). Vol. 21 (vigesimoprimo). Venezia: Antonelli. pp. 629–630.
- Franchino, Egidio (1929). La Diocesi di Piazza Armerina. Ragioni storiche della sua erezione. Piazza Armerina: Stefano Bologna 1929.
- Giuliano, Giuseppe (1967). La diocesi di Piazza Armerina: Note di religione, storia, arte, folklore su: Piazza Armerina, Enna, Gela, Aidone, Barrafranca, Butera, Mazzarino, Niscemi, Pietraperzia, Riesi, Valguarnera, Villarosa. (in Italian). Scuola tipografica Città die ragazzi, 1967.
- Marzo-Ferro, Girolamo di (1860). Stato presente della chiesa di Sicilia, ossia continuazione alla Sicilia sacra di Rocco Pirri. Palermo: Lo Bianco, 1860. (pp. 89-96)
- Masuzzo, Gaetano (2017), Cronologia civile e ecclesiastica di Piazza e dintorni: Palazzi, chiese, conventi, ordini religiosi, confraternite, alberi genealogici, uomini illustri e avvenimenti memorabili di una delle più belle cittadine del centro Sicilia. (in Italian). Gaeta: Passerino Editore, 2017.
- Ritzler, Remigius; Sefrin, Pirminus (1968). Hierarchia Catholica medii et recentioris aevi (in Latin). Vol. VII (1800–1846). Monasterii: Libr. Regensburgiana.
- Remigius Ritzler; Pirminus Sefrin (1978). Hierarchia catholica Medii et recentioris aevi (in Latin). Vol. VIII (1846–1903. Il Messaggero di S. Antonio.
- Pięta, Zenon (2002). Hierarchia catholica medii et recentioris aevi (in Latin). Vol. IX (1903–1922). Padua: Messagero di San Antonio. ISBN 978-88-250-1000-8.

=== External links ===
- (in Italian) Diocesan page
