= San Nicola di Bari =

San Nicola di Bari can refer to:

- Saint Nicholas, whose bones were moved to Bari from Myra in modern-day Turkey, in 1087
- Basilica di San Nicola, the church in Bari built to house the saint's relics
- San Nicola di Bari, Randazzo church
- San Nicola di Bari, Bomporto church
- San Nicola di Bari, Sestola church
- San Nicola di Bari, Pozzaglia Sabina church
