= Jeanne-Antide Thouret =

French Roman Catholic saint

Saint Jeanne-Antide Thouret SCSJA
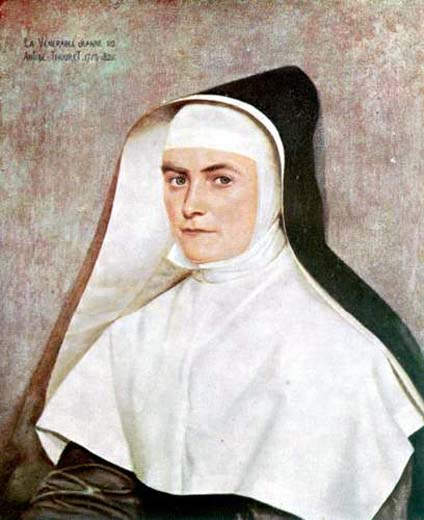

Nun
- Born: 27 November 1765; Sancey-le-Long, Doubs, Kingdom of France
- Died: 24 August 1826 (aged 60); Naples, Kingdom of the Two Sicilies
- Venerated in: Roman Catholic Church
- Beatified: 23 May 1926 by Pope Pius XI
- Canonized: 14 January 1934 by Pope Pius XI
- Feast: May 23
- Patronage: Sisters of Divine Charity

Jeanne-Antide Thouret, SCSJA (27 November 1765 - 24 August 1826; also called Joan Antide Thouret and Jane Antide) was a French Catholic nun who founded a branch of the Sisters of Charity.

== Biography ==
Thouret was born in Sancey, in the Franche-Comté region of eastern France, on November 27, 1765, the fifth child of a poor and "deeply Christian family". She was baptized the day she was born and was named after her godmother. She had three older brothers. Thouret "felt a strong attraction to the stricter religious life and at the same time to the service of the poor" at a young age. Her mother died when she was sixteen years old; she cared for her family and siblings, despite conflict with her aunt who disagreed with her father's decision to allow her to care for her siblings. When she was 22, against the wishes of her family who wanted her to marry, Thouret entered the Daughters of Charity of Saint Vincent de Paul to serve the poor and work in hospitals, first in Langres and then in Paris. While a postulant, she had what she described as her first "encounter" with St. Vincent de Paul, establishing what she considered the close father-daughter relationship with him that lasted her whole life.

On August 15, 1797, Thouret founded a school for poor girls in Besançon and on April 11, 1799, founded the Sisters of Charity and with two young women, founded a soup kitchen for the poor and a free school for girls, also in Besançon. During the French Revolution, when religious communities were suppressed and many priests and religious were killed, she was ordered to return to her family's home, but she refused and was badly beaten when she tried to escape the authorities. Thouret returned to Sancey in 1797, where she founded a small school for girls and worked with the sick until she had to flee to Switzerland, Germany, and then back to Switzerland in 1799, where she opened a school, hospital, and a congregation called the Institute of the Daughters of St. Vincent de Paul, which eventually expanded into France and Italy.

From May to September 1802, Thouret revised a Rule of Life for her community. Accompanied by several sisters "attracted by her ideal of life", she opened new schools and hospitals for the poor. On September 23, 1802, she began working with prisoners in Bellevaux, teaching, providing them with food, and organizing the prisoners' "work permitting them to receive a salary". In 1807, her community was officially named the "Sisters of Charity of Besançon". On May 8, 1810, she and some sisters travelled to Savoy, Thonon, and a little later, with eight sisters, to Naples, where she cared for "Incurables" at a hospital. She also opened a school and a pharmacy at a convent they were given. Pope Pius VII approved their community, which he named “Sisters of Charity under the protection of St. Vincent de Paul", on July 23, 1819. As of 2020, there were 4,000 sisters, spread over 27 countries, in the Sisters of Charity community, who provide a large variety of services for the poor. "Community life, the Eucharist and the Paschal Mystery are today, as they were for [Thouret], the key elements of their life".

Thouret died of natural causes in Naples on August 24, 1826. She was beatified on May 23, 1926 and canonized on January 14, 1934 by Pope Pius XI. Her statue appears among the 39 founders of religious orders at St. Peter's Basilica in Vatican City. Her feast day is May 23.

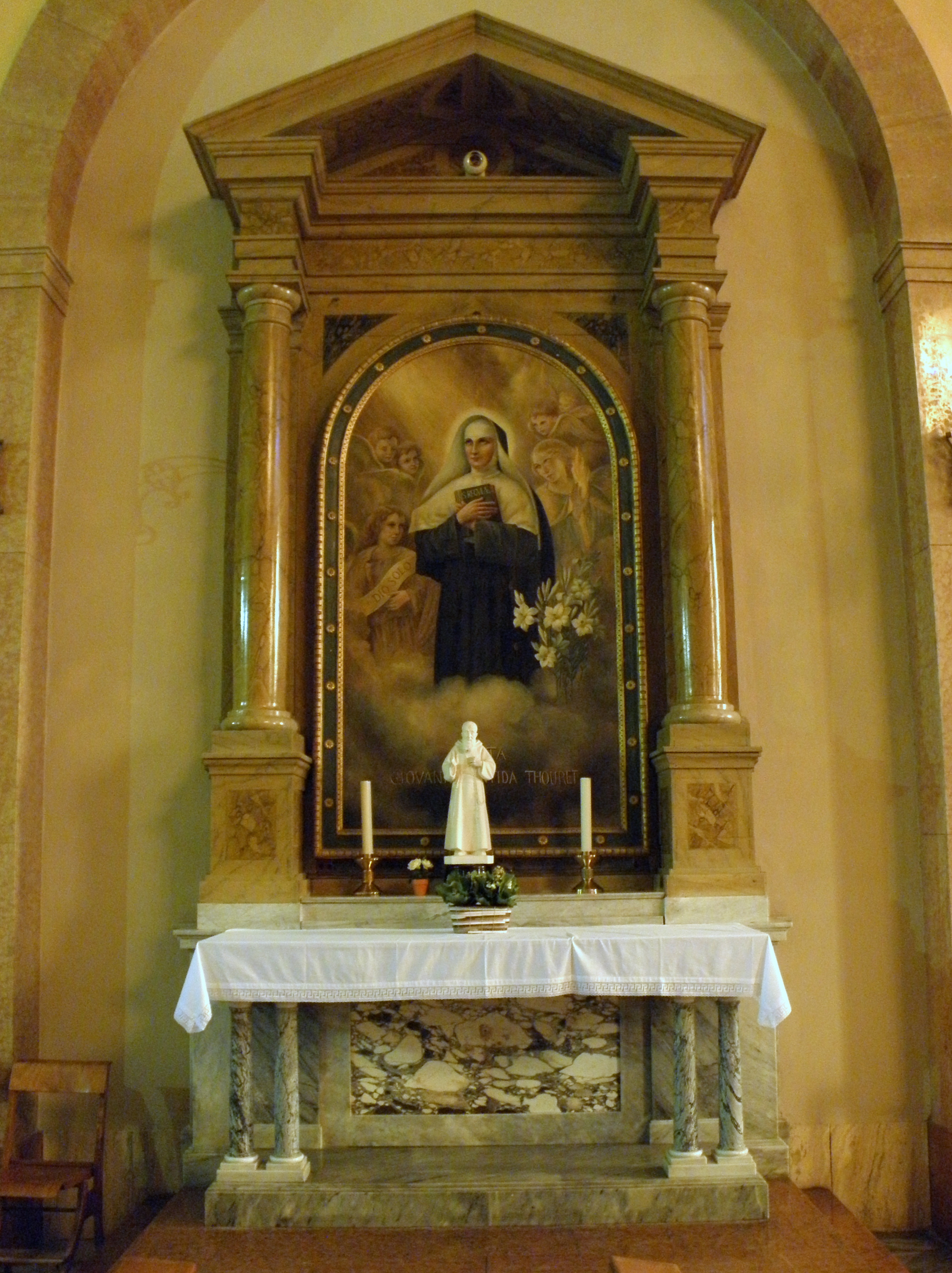
Side altar dedicated to St. Jeanne-Antide Thouret in the Church of Santa Maria degli Angeli in Adria, Northern Italy.

== Works cited ==
- Rogatti, María Clara (November–December 2007). "The Life Experience of St Joan Antide Thouret" (PDF). Vincentiana (in Italian): 441–453. Retrieved 27 May 2022.
