= Agostina Livia Pietrantoni =

Italian Roman Catholic religious sister and saint (1864–1894)

Saint Agostina Livia Pietrantoni SDC

Virgin and Martyr
- Born: 27 March 1864; Pozzaglia Sabina, Rieti, Kingdom of Italy
- Died: 13 November 1894 (aged 30); Rome, Kingdom of Italy
- Venerated in: Roman Catholic Church; Apostolic Catholic Church
- Beatified: 12 November 1972, Saint Peter's Square by Pope Paul VI
- Canonized: 18 April 1999, Saint Peter's Square by Pope John Paul II
- Feast: 13 November

Agostina Pietrantoni (27 March 1864 – 13 November 1894) born Livia Pietrantoni, was an Italian religious sister of the Sisters of Divine Charity. Pietrantoni worked as a nurse in the Santo Spirito hospital in Rome where she tended to ill victims in a tuberculosis ward before a patient murdered her in 1894. Her canonisation was celebrated on 18 April 1999 in Saint Peter's Square.

== Life ==
Olivia or Livia Pietrantoni was born on 27 March 1864 in Pozzaglia Sabina, about 50 kilometres north-east of Rome, as the second of eleven children to the poor farmers Francesco Pietrantoni and Caterina Costantini. She made her First Communion in 1868 and then received her Confirmation just under a decade later in 1876.

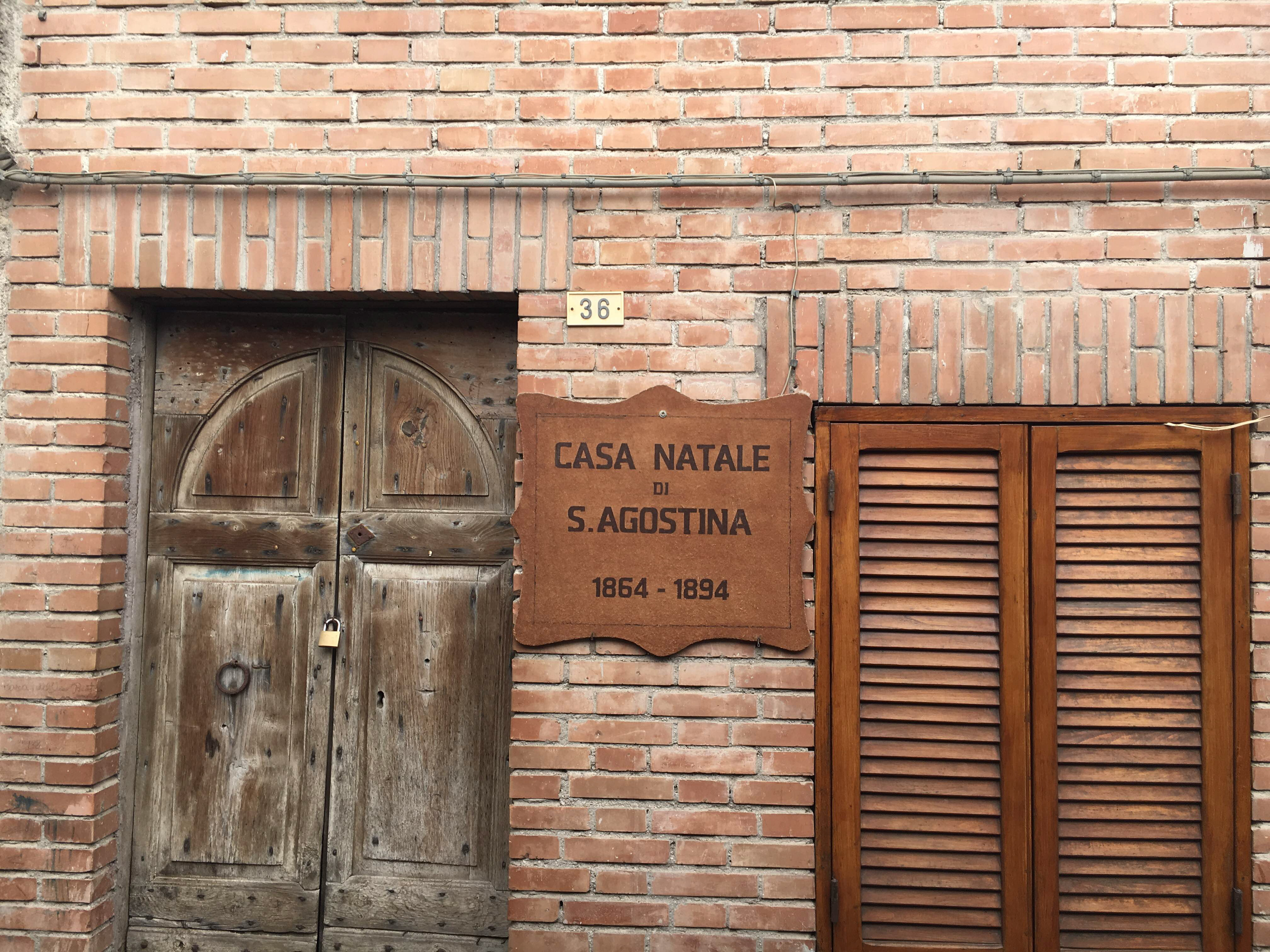
Saint Agostina's birthplace

Pietrantoni started work in 1871 and she worked doing manual labour for road construction and later in 1876 left for Tivoli with other adolescent seasonal workers during the winter months for the olive harvest. She refused offers of marriage – despite her mother's insistence – and so travelled to Rome with her priest uncle Matteo in January 1886 with the aim of entering consecrated life in order to pursue her vocation. When she sent a letter of admission to their generalate in Rome, the Sisters of Divine Charity declined her request. Pietrantoni persisted in finding a place to pursue her call and a few months later was accepted into the congregation. She bade farewell to her parents and left for Rome once more where she joined the congregation in the Via Santa Maria in Cosmedin on 23 March 1886. She assumed the religious name of Agostina upon her clothing ceremony on 13 August 1887.

Sister Agostina was sent to the Santo Spirito Hospital in Rome as a nurse on 13 August 1887 and remained there until her death. While working in the tuberculosis ward she contracted the disease herself but recovered and so was sent to the ward herself in 1889 to tend to ill patients there. On one particular occasion she was attacked and beaten because she had seized a knife from a patient and it worried the other religious despite Pietrantoni's insistence that she was fine and would continue to work.

The male patient Giuseppe Romanelli began to harass her at this point; he even sent her death threats. On the evening of 12 November 1894 she was asked to take time off since the sisters worried for her; she refused. Romanelli attacked and stabbed her to death in the morning of 13 November 1894. Pietrantoni forgave her killer moments before she died of her wounds. Romanelli stabbed her in a dark corridor with three stabs to the shoulder and left arm and the jugular before a final stab in the chest. Her final words were: "Mother of mine: help me!" Professor Achille Ballori – who had once warned her about Romanelli – inspected her remains and observed that "Sister Agostina has allowed herself to be slaughtered like a lamb" and noted there were no contractions of either her nerves or heart. The funeral blocked the streets of Rome (thousands lined the streets and knelt before the casket as it passed them) and a report in the Messaggero newspaper on 16 November stated that "never a more impressive spectacle was seen in Rome". Sister Agostina's remains were moved to the generalate on 3 February 1941 and, following her canonisation, to her hometown on 14 November 2004.

== Beatification process ==
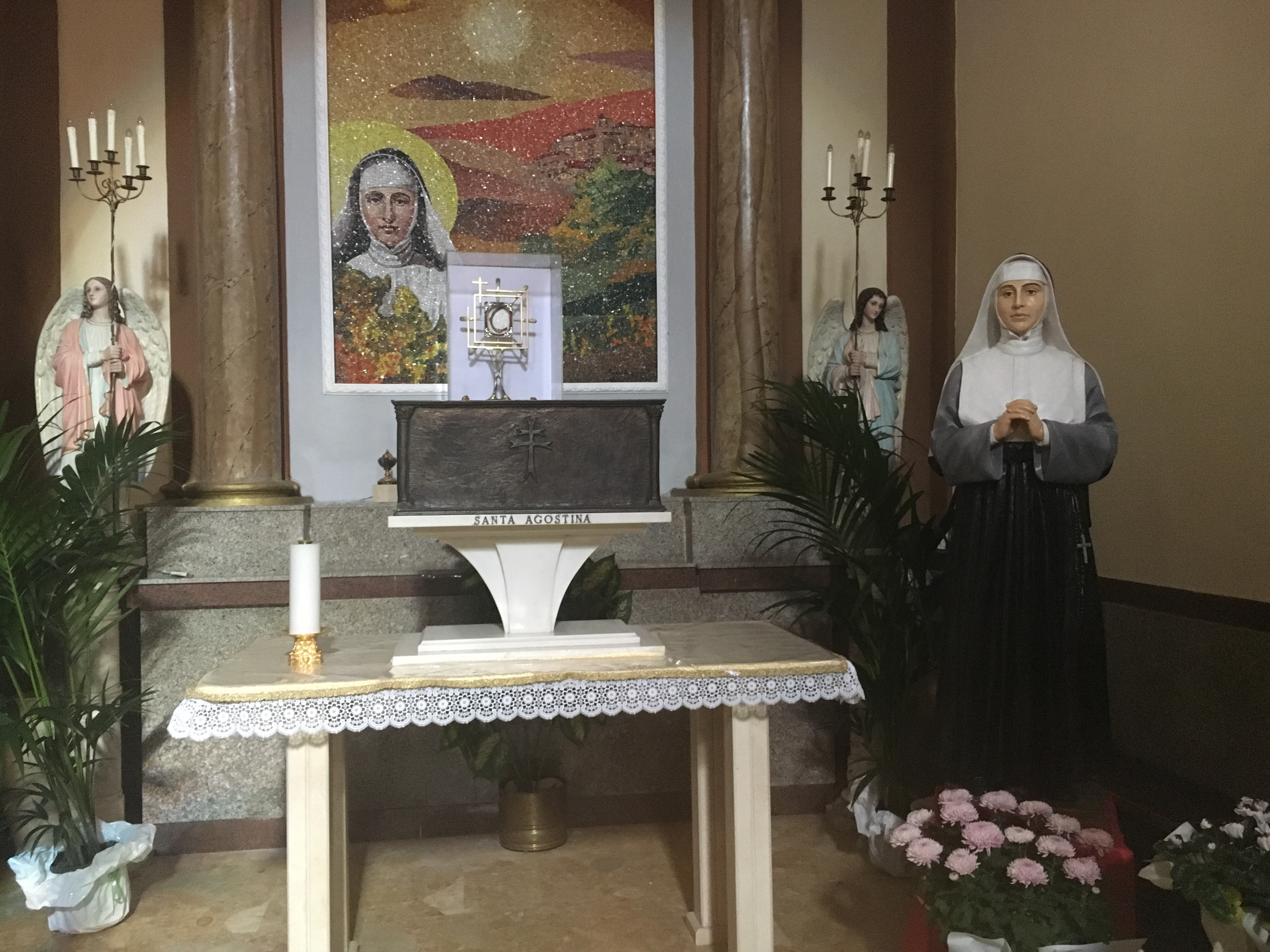
Saint Agostina's tomb

Agostina's spiritual writings were approved by theologians on 28 May 1941. The beatification process opened on 14 December 1945 under Pope Pius XII, and Pope Paul VI later attributed to her the title venerable on 19 September 1968. On 12 November 1972 he presided over her beatification.

A miracle worked by Agostina's intercession was investigated and received validation from the Congregation for the Causes of Saints on 19 March 1996. The medical board assented to this on 17 April 1997 as did a panel of theologians on 7 October 1997, and subsequently the members of the Congregation on 20 January 1998. Pope John Paul II approved this miracle on 6 April 1998 and canonised Agostina on 18 April 1999.

St Agostina was declared the patron saint for nurses in Italy on 20 May 2003 following deliberations of the Italian Episcopal Conference.
