= San Martino, Randazzo =

Church in Randazzo, Italy

Coordinates: 37.8°N 14.9°E

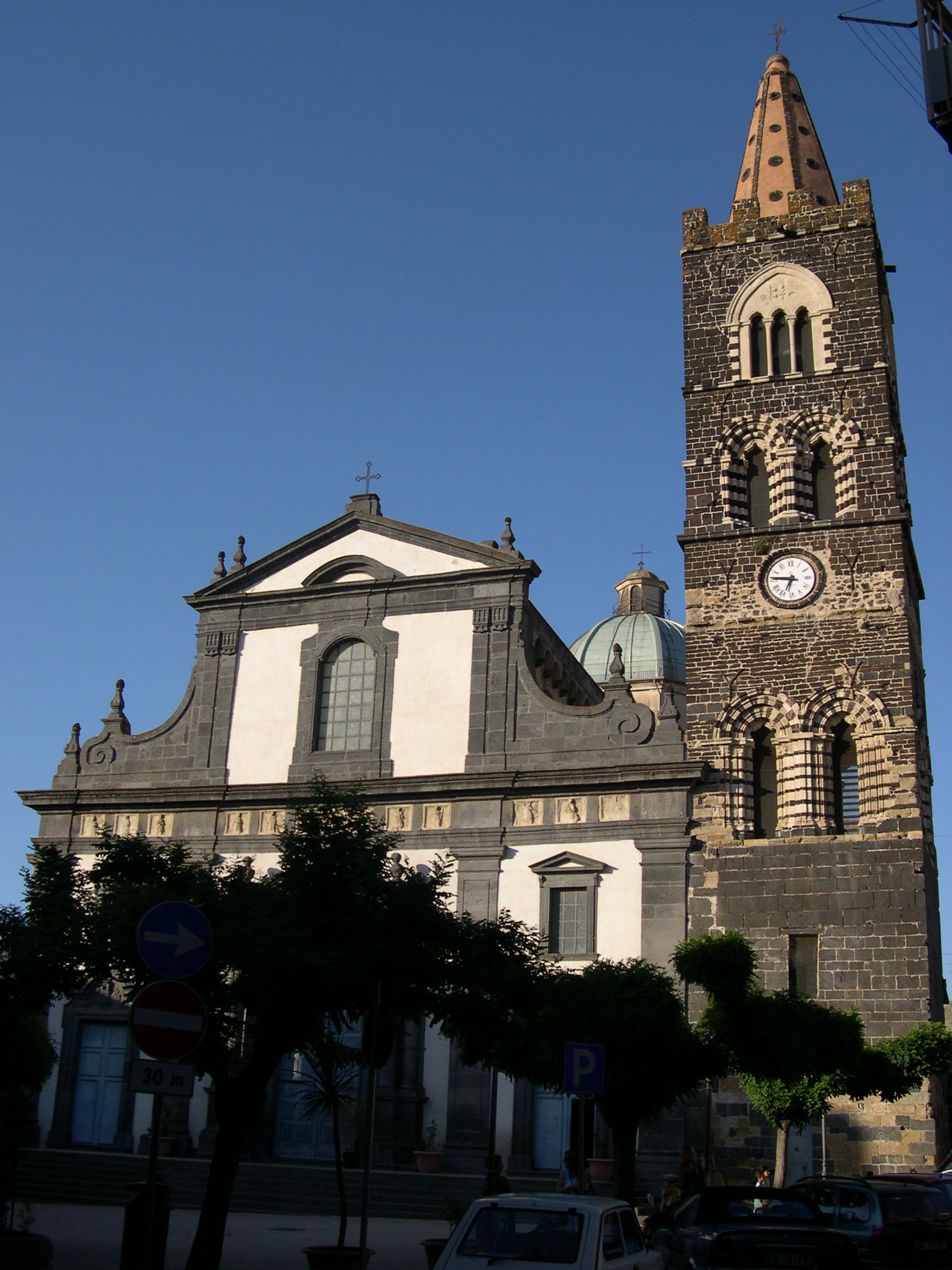
Facade of church with bell-tower

San Martino is a Roman Catholic parish church located in Randazzo in the region of Sicily, Italy.

== History and description ==
A church at the site was initially built in the 13th century, but has undergone extensive reconstructions. The church is notable for retaining its 13th-century bell-tower with mullioned windows. The facade dates to the late 16th century with the main elements made with black lava stone. In the facade, the central nave is two stories and connects through volutes to the lateral aisles.

The interior houses a marble baptismal font (1447) by Angelo Riccio; a Crucifix (1530) by Matinati, a 15th-century Pieta, a marble gothic ciborium, a polyptich depicting the Madonna between Saints Magdalen and Martha attributed to Antonello da Saliba, a Madonna delle Grazie by Vincenzo Gagini (1535), and a Madonna della Misericordia by followers of Gagini.
