= Randazzo =

Randazzo Randákion (Greek)
- Comune
- Comune di Randazzo
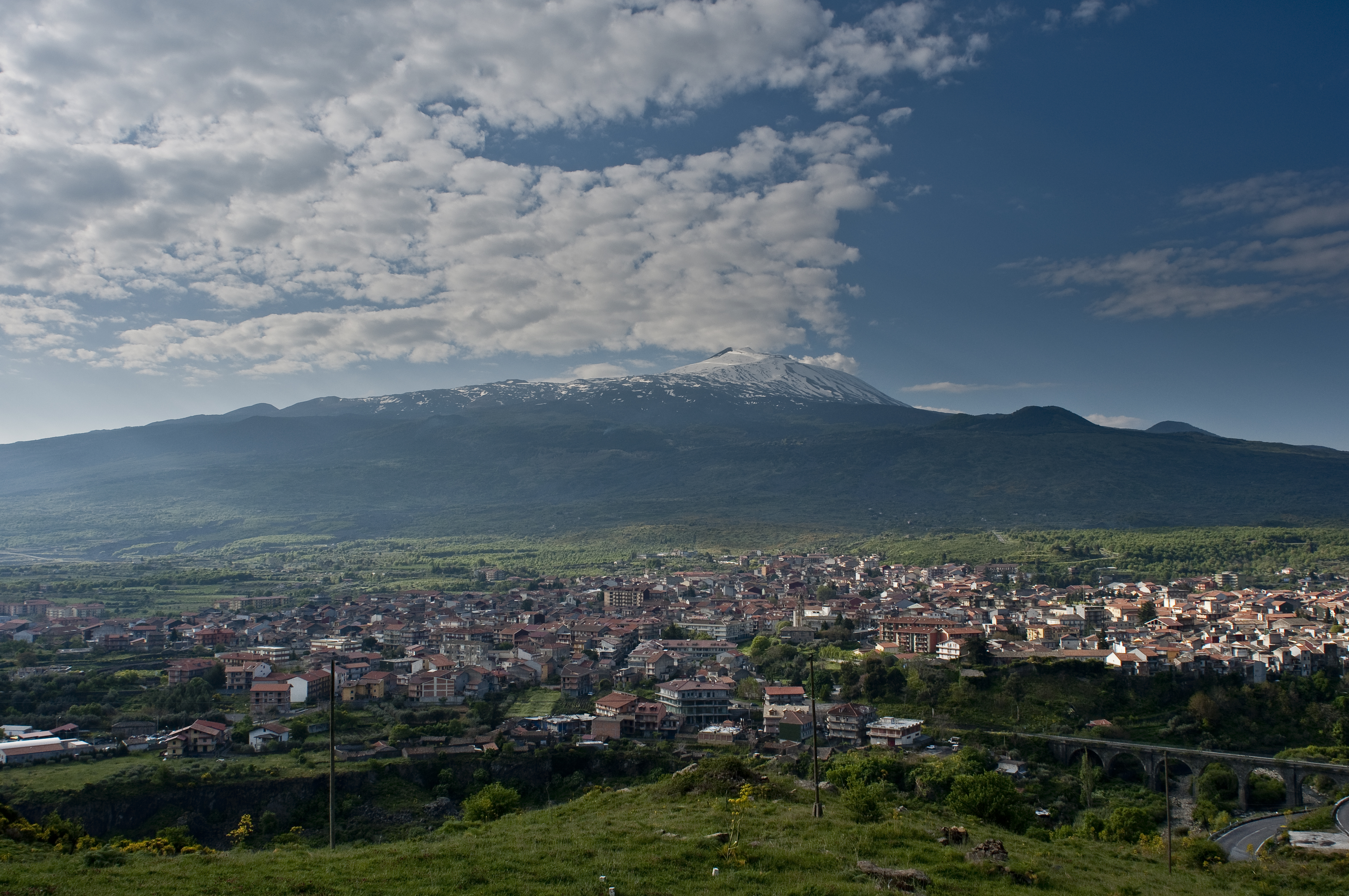
- Randazzo.

- Coat of arms

- Location within Italy Location within Sicily
- Coordinates: 37°53′N 14°57′E
- Country: Italy
- Region: Sicily
- Metropolitan city: Catania (CT)
- Frazioni: Flascio, Monte la Guardia, Murazzorotto

Government
  - Mayor: Francesco Giovanni Emanuele Sgroi

Area
  - Total: 205.62 km^{2} (79.39 sq mi)
- Elevation: 765 m (2,510 ft)

Population (31 December 2015)
  - Total: 10,900
  - Density: 53.0/km^{2} (137/sq mi)
- Demonym: randazzesi
- Time zone: UTC+1 (CET)
  - Summer (DST): UTC+2 (CEST)
- Postal code: 95036
- Dialing code: 095
- Patron saint: Saint Joseph
- Saint day: 19 March
- Website: www.comune.randazzo.ct.it

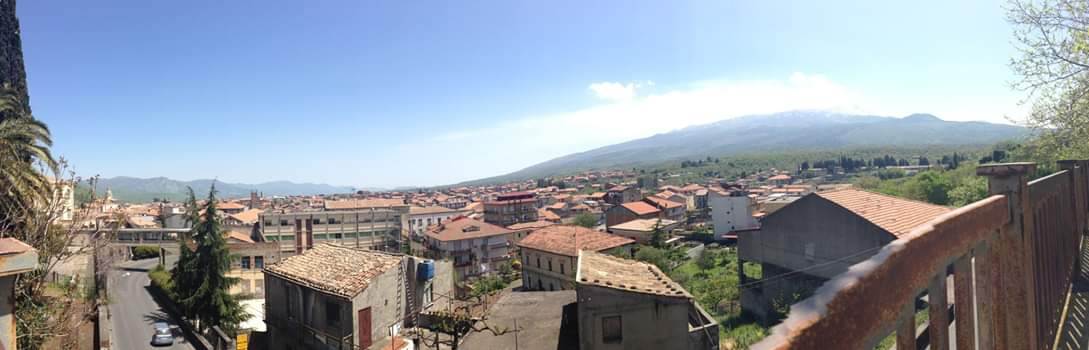
Randazzo

Randazzo (Sicilian: Rannazzu) is a town and comune in the Metropolitan City of Catania, Sicily, southern Italy. It is situated at the northern foot of Mount Etna, c. 70 kilometres (43 mi) northwest of Catania. It is the nearest town to the summit of Etna, and is one of the points from which the ascent may be made.

== History ==
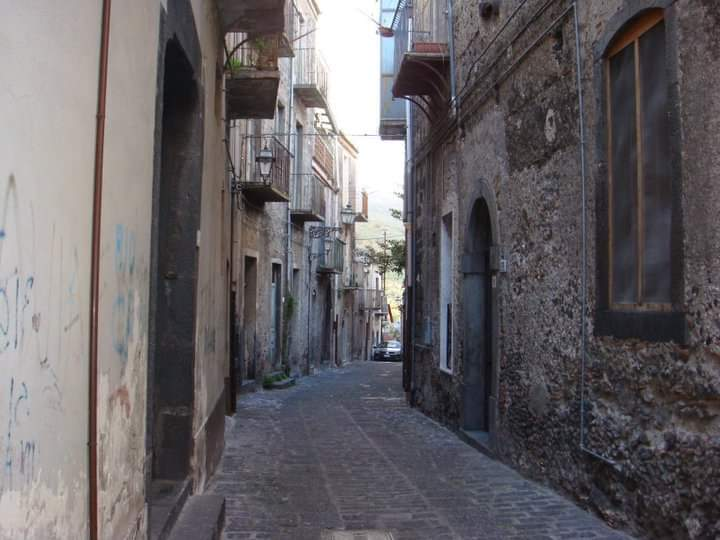
Street in Randazzo

In the 13th century the town had its own army, which fought in favor of the king against the rebels. In 1210 King Frederick II of Hohenstaufen and Queen Constance of Aragon sheltered at Randazzo to escape the terrible plague which raged in Palermo.

Randazzo became one of the most densely populated towns in the island, after Palermo and Messina. The town was also divided into three main districts: the Greeks lived in St. Nicola's quarter, the Latins in St. Mary's and the Lombards in St. Martin's.

Randazzo was the scene of important action during the latter phases of Operation Husky, the Allied invasion of Sicily, during World War II. Nazi forces were driven from the island by a combined force of British and American troops, which also contained Canadian troops who were fighting under British command. In the course of their retreat the Nazis attempted to hold the northeastern corner of Sicily in the hopes that they would eventually be able to retake the entire island. The Nazis had to abandon this plan when the British 30th Corps forced their way into Adrano while at the same time the British 13th Corps battled the Nazis in the nearby town of Randazzo. Once Adrano and Randazzo fell to the British, the Nazis decided they had no choice but to retire to Messina and use it to evacuate the rest of their forces from Sicily.

== Main sights ==
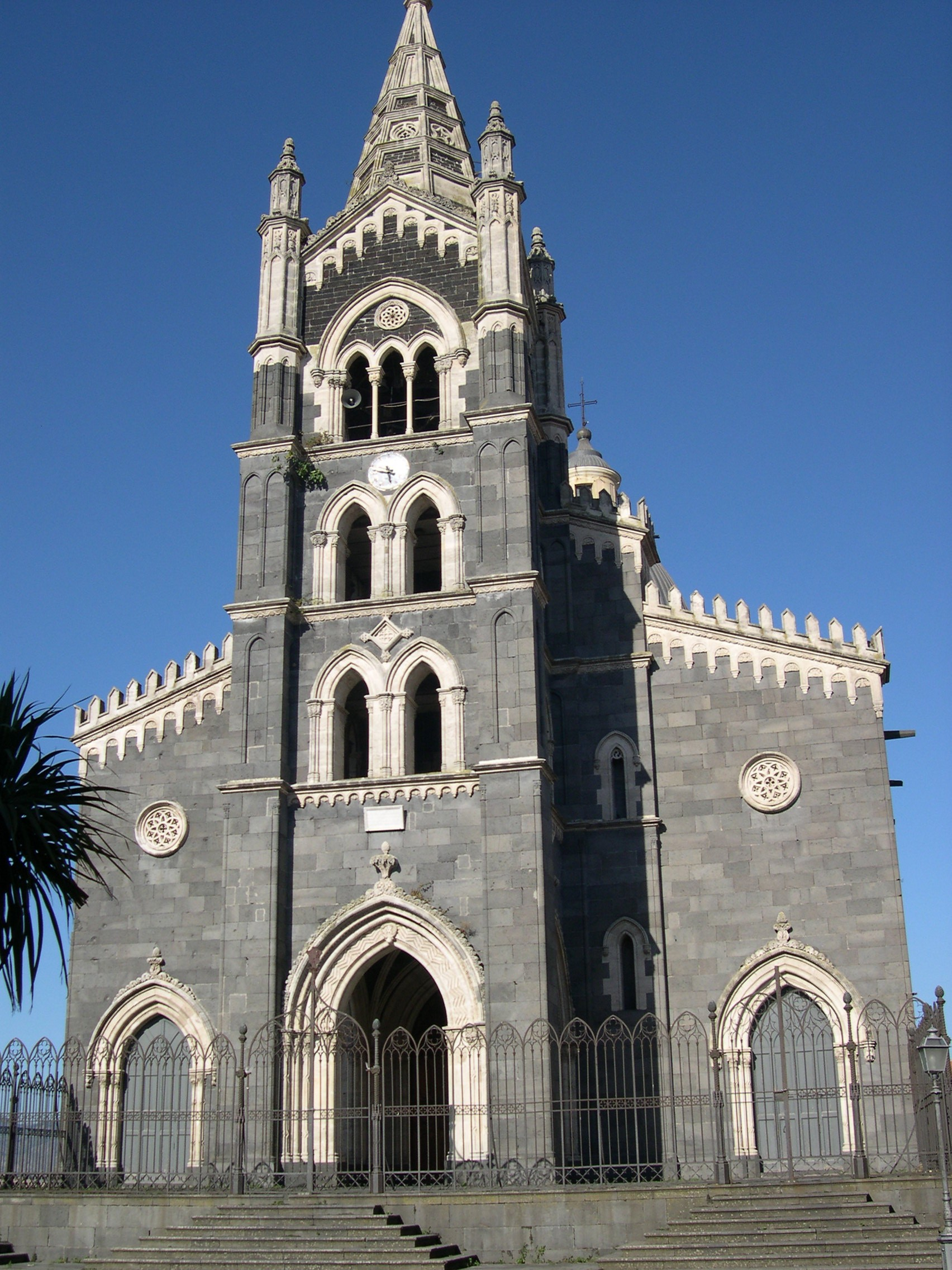
Basilica of Santa Maria Assunta.

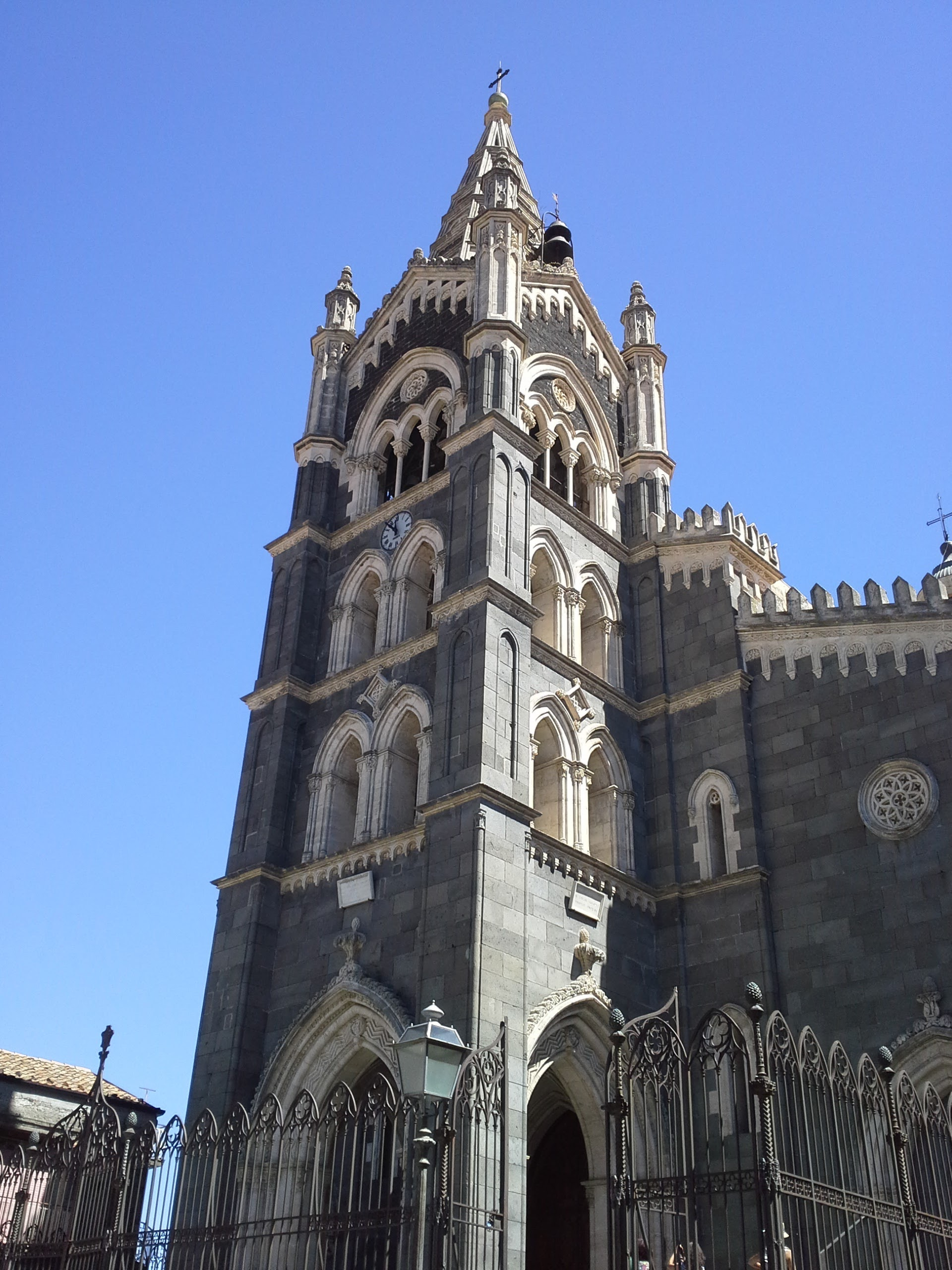
Santa Maria Randazzo Sicily Italy taken in April 2013

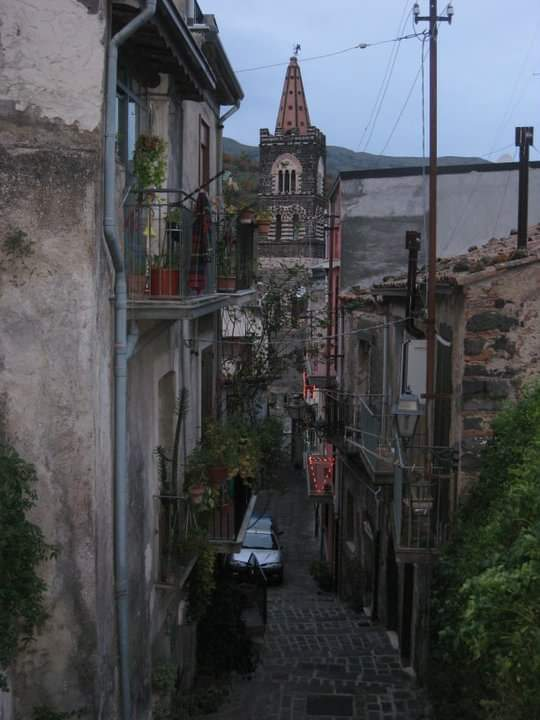
San Martino through Via Perciabosco

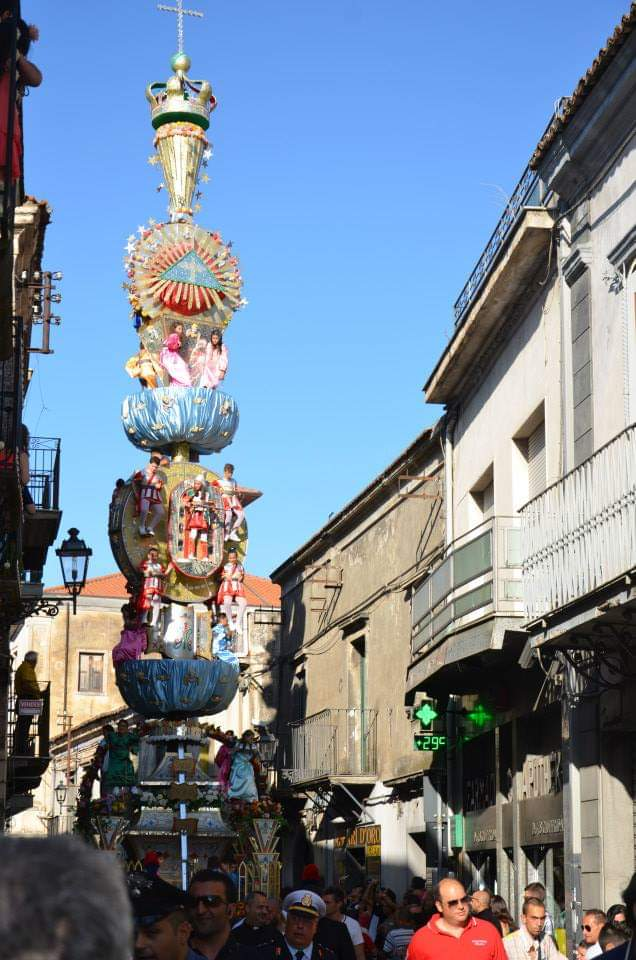
The Vara is displayed throughout the town every 15 August

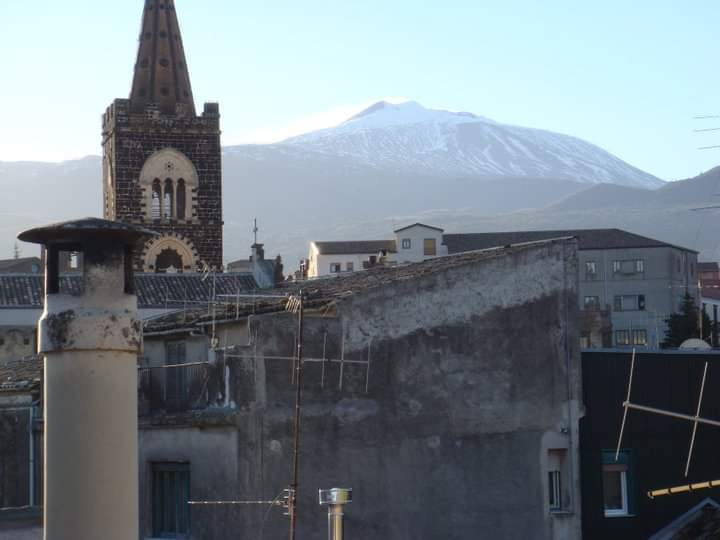
San Martino with Mt Etna in the background. Taken in December 2009

- Santa Maria Assunta church has a façade completely built of black lava stone, three polygonal apses in the form of towers and 15th-century side portals in the Catalan-Gothic style. The huge interior is divided into three naves by black monolithic columns, and preserves statues by the Gagini school and six paintings by Giuseppe Velasquez (1750–1827).
- San Martino church has a well-preserved 14th-century bell tower mostly consisting of black lava bricks.
- San Nicola di Bari church, the largest in the town, originally established in the 14th century but rebuilt in 1585. It houses works by Giacomo and Antonello Gagini, and in the right nave a triptych by Messinese painters
- Castello Svevo ("Hohenstaufen Castle"), the only one remaining of the eight medieval towers, on a high lava rock, already existing at the time of Frederick II of Hohenstaufen. For a time it was the seat of the Giustiziere del Valdemone (a kind of medieval judge and governor) and a prison, then became the mansion of the Romeo e Vagliasindi families, to become again a prison in later centuries: a sinister building, with tiny cells, a torture chamber, the wall for those who were sentenced to be bricked up alive. After a recent restoration the castle is used today as an exhibition center and houses a collection of "Pupi siciliani" and the Paolo Vagliasindi archeological museum.
- Aragonese Gate
- Palazzo Lanza
- Palazzo Scala, a former Royal residence from the 12th century.
- Palazzo Finocchiaro (1509)

== People ==
- Domenico Spadafora (1450–1521), a Roman Catholic priest, professed member of the Order of Preachers beatified by Pope Benedict XV in 1921.

== Transportation ==
Randazzo is served by two stations: one of the Ferrovia Circumetnea, connecting to Giarre and Catania; one on main Trenitalia station, once connecting it to Taormina and Messina, currently inactive.

== Twin towns ==
- Monte Cerignone, Italy
