= Santo Stefano Protomartire, Pozzaglia Sabina =

Church in Pozzaglia Sabina, Italy

Santo Stefano Protomartire is a Roman Catholic church in the town of Pozzaglia Sabina, in the province of Rieti, region of Lazio, Italy.

A church at this site is documented by 1252, however much of this stone church dates from the 15th-century. It still preserves a Romanesque hemicircular apse. It appears to have been patronized by the 17th-century feudal lords of the town, the Marchesi Santacroce. The main altar has a canvas depicting St Helen discovers the true cross by Raffaello Vanni. Other altarpieces in the church depict a Saints and Madonna of the Rosary and a Martyrdom of St Stephen. In the 19th century much of the decoration on the walls was refurbished.
