= Sancey-le-Grand =

- Part of Sancey

- Coat of arms
- Location of Sancey-le-Grand
- Location within France Location within Bourgogne-Franche-Comté
- Coordinates: 47°17′41″N 6°34′59″E
- Country: France
- Region: Bourgogne-Franche-Comté
- Department: Doubs
- Arrondissement: Montbéliard
- Canton: Bavans
- Commune: Sancey
- Area^{1}: 23.55 km^{2} (9.09 sq mi)
- Highest elevation: 800 m (2,600 ft)
- Lowest elevation: 461 m (1,512 ft)
- Population (2013): 930
  - Density: 39/km^{2} (100/sq mi)
- Time zone: UTC+01:00 (CET)
  - Summer (DST): UTC+02:00 (CEST)
- Postal code: 25430
- ^{1} French Land Register data, which excludes lakes, ponds, glaciers > 1 km^{2} (0.386 sq mi or 247 acres) and river estuaries.

Sancey-le-Grand (French pronunciation: [sɑ̃sɛ l(ə) ɡʁɑ̃]; lit. 'Sancey-the-Great') is a former commune in the Doubs department in the Bourgogne-Franche-Comté region in eastern France. On 1 January 2016, it was merged with Sancey-le-Long into the new commune Sancey.

== Geography ==
The commune lies on the first plateau of the river Doubs 55 km (34 mi) northeast of Besançon and 45 km (28 mi) southeast of Montbéliard.

== Population ==
Historical population

Year	Pop.	±% p.a.
1793	899	—
1800	747	−2.61%
1806	676	−1.65%
1821	933	+2.17%
1831	1,001	+0.71%
1836	1,036	+0.69%
1841	957	−1.57%
1846	960	+0.06%
1851	960	+0.00%
1856	935	−0.53%
1861	952	+0.36%
1866	945	−0.15%
1872	878	−1.22%
1876	815	−1.84%
1881	822	+0.17%
1886	852	+0.72%
1891	856	+0.09%
1896	889	+0.76%

Year	Pop.	±% p.a.
1901	828	−1.41%
1906	802	−0.64%
1911	792	−0.25%
1921	669	−1.67%
1926	688	+0.56%
1931	675	−0.38%
1936	658	−0.51%
1946	665	+0.11%
1954	674	+0.17%
1962	786	+1.94%
1968	753	−0.71%
1975	839	+1.56%
1982	1,020	+2.83%
1990	1,091	+0.84%
1999	1,021	−0.73%
2006	1,003	−0.25%
2013	930	−1.07%

Source: EHESS and INSEE

== See also ==
- Communes of the Doubs department
