= San Nicola di Bari, Pozzaglia Sabina =

Church in Pozzaglia Sabina, Italy

San Nicola di Bari is a Roman Catholic church in the town of Pozzaglia Sabina, in the province of Rieti, region of Lazio, Italy.

A church dedicated to Saint Nicholas of Myra at this site was present by the 15th-century. In the first chapel of the right is a white marble statue of Saint Antony of Padua. On the right, the first chapel is dedicated to St Agostina, and the chapel is claimed to hold her relics. Around the altar are 17th-century busts of Saints. The 17th-century tabernacle is made of wood. Behind the altar is an urn putatively holding the relics of the martyred Saint Ulpia Candida, placed there by pope Clement XII. The apse has a large 16th-century fresco, flanked by columns, depicting a Crucifixion with Saints Gregory the Great and San Nicola.
