= Sancey-le-Long =

- Part of Sancey
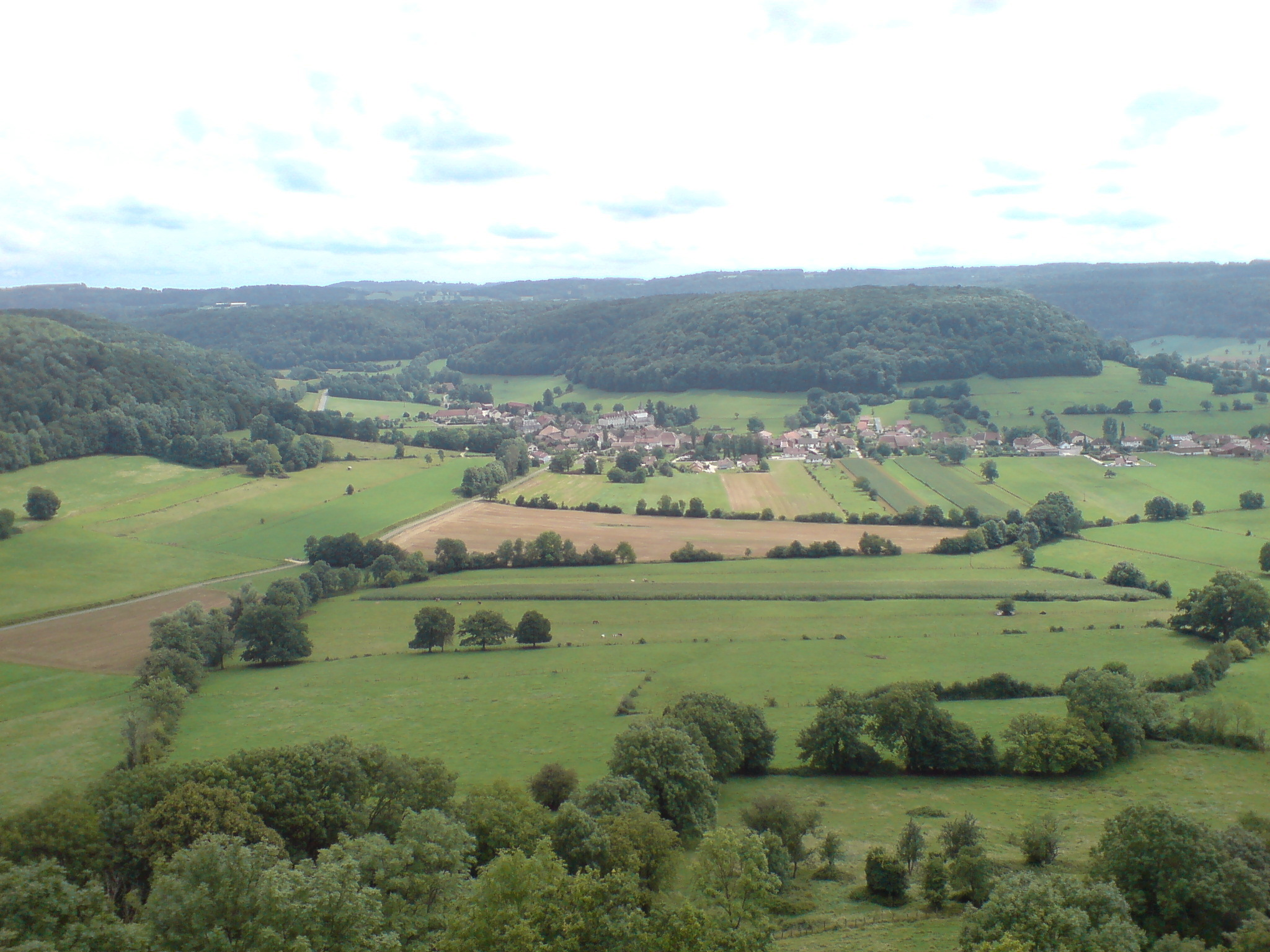
- Location of Sancey-le-Long
- Location within France Location within Bourgogne-Franche-Comté
- Coordinates: 47°18′23″N 6°36′11″E
- Country: France
- Region: Bourgogne-Franche-Comté
- Department: Doubs
- Arrondissement: Montbéliard
- Canton: Bavans
- Commune: Sancey
- Area^{1}: 7.02 km^{2} (2.71 sq mi)
- Highest elevation: 675 m (2,215 ft)
- Lowest elevation: 480 m (1,570 ft)
- Population (2013): 345
  - Density: 49.1/km^{2} (127/sq mi)
- Time zone: UTC+01:00 (CET)
  - Summer (DST): UTC+02:00 (CEST)
- Postal code: 25430
- ^{1} French Land Register data, which excludes lakes, ponds, glaciers > 1 km^{2} (0.386 sq mi or 247 acres) and river estuaries.

Sancey-le-Long (French pronunciation: [sɑ̃sɛ lə lɔ̃]; lit. 'Sancey-the-Long') is a former commune in the Doubs department in the Bourgogne-Franche-Comté region in eastern France. On 1 January 2016, it was merged into the new commune Sancey.

== Geography ==
The commune lies 51 km (32 mi) east of Besançon near the Swiss border.

== See also ==
- Sancey-le-Grand
- Communes of the Doubs department
