= San Nicola di Bari, Bomporto =

Church in Bomporto, Italy

San Nicola di Bari is a Neoclassical-style, Roman Catholic church located on Piazza Roma in the center of the town of Bomporto, province of Modena, region of Emilia-Romagna, Italy.

== History ==
A church at the site was founded in the 17th-century in this town, which was a hub of river traffic, hence the church was dedicated to San Nicola da Bari, protector of boat pilots. The church facade with s simple tympanum and tall columns was built in 1837 using designs of Gusmano Soli. The main altar has a terracotta statuary group of Christ on the Cross between the Virgin and St John (1538-1540) by Antonio Begarelli. Statues of St Pellegrino and Bonaventure, once were part of the group but are now in the Galleria Estense of Modena.
