= San Nicola di Bari, Randazzo =

Church in Randazzo, Italy

Coordinates: 37.87879°N 14.94581°E

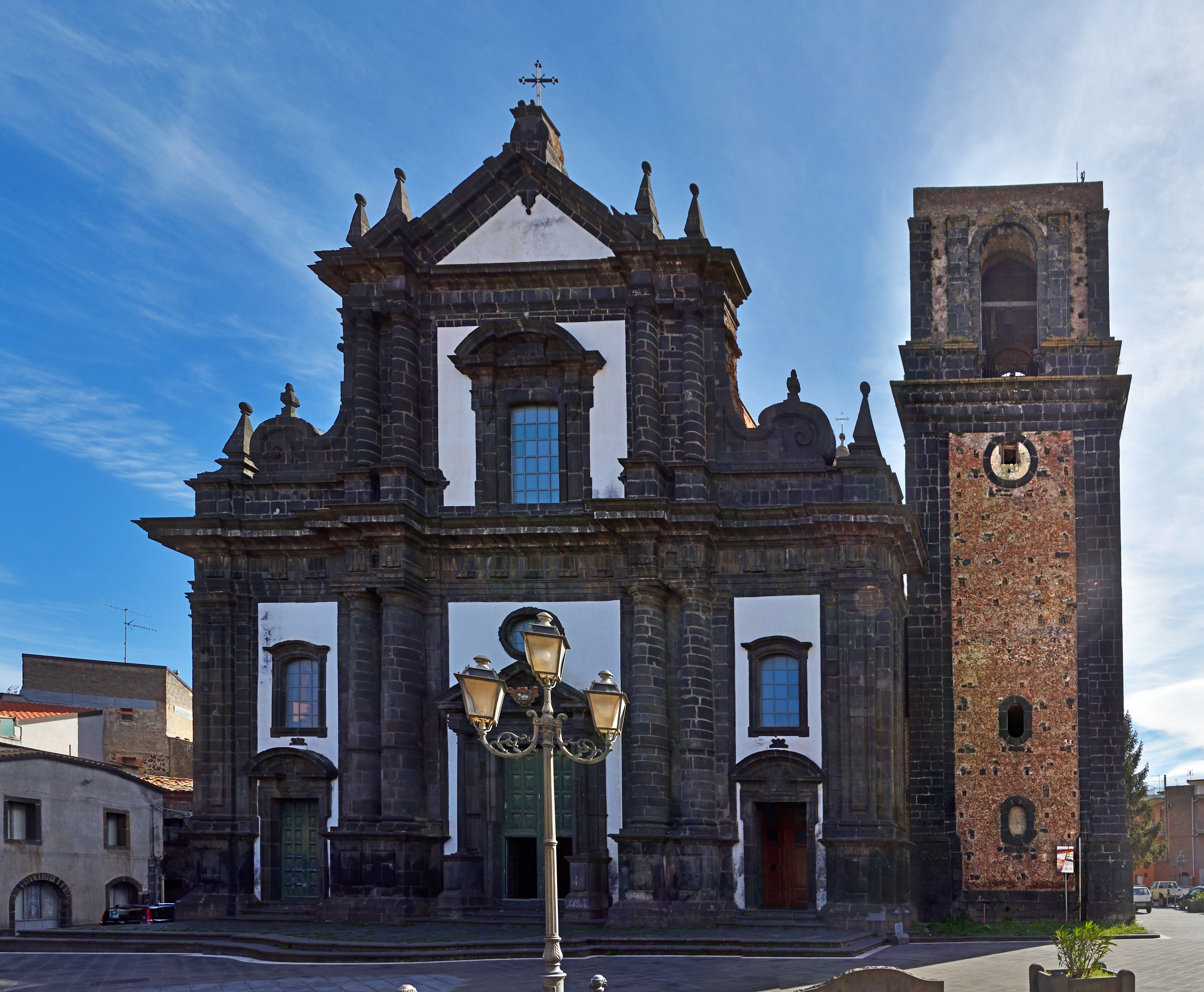
Facade of church

San Nicola di Bari ("Saint Nicholas of Bari") is a Roman Catholic parish church located in Randazzo in the region of Sicily, Italy.

== History and description ==
A church at the site was initially built in the 13th century. The peculiar polygonal apse with a medieval cornice was built in a Norman-Swabian style. This church was originally dedicated to the Holy Saviour (Santissimo Salvatore). With the importations of Lombards to this neighborhood during the rule of Sicily under the Normans, the church's patron changed. However, the church underwent a major refurbishment during 1591 to 1605, with construction of nave pillars. Under the Aragonese rule of the Kingdom of Sicily, the church served as site for the reunion of the General Parliament of Sicily. The original bell-tower collapsed during the 1693 Sicily earthquake. In 1746, after another reconstruction, the church was reconsecrated. In 1751 it became a collegiate church. Bombardment during 1943 caused damage to the church, including collapse.

The architect of the 16th-century facade was Andrea Calamech. The elements are clearly defined using dark lava stone. The campanile, still incomplete, was built in 1783.

Among the works housed inside the church is a marble painted sculpture of San Nicola di Bari (1523) by Antonello Gagini. There is a painted crucifix on wood from the 16th century, the Renaissance triptych Virgin between Saints Lucy and Agatha, the 15th-century altarpiece Madonna and Child with St James, Christ bearing the Cross by Onofnio Gabriele, and Trinity (1651) by Giuseppe Tomasi.

The mutilated statue in front of the church is called the statue of old Randazzo (Sicilian: Rannazzu Vecchiu). Putatively the statue depicts a surrounded by the symbols of the ancient city's three communities: Latins (eagle), Greeks (lion), and Lombards (snake).
