= Sancey =

- Commune
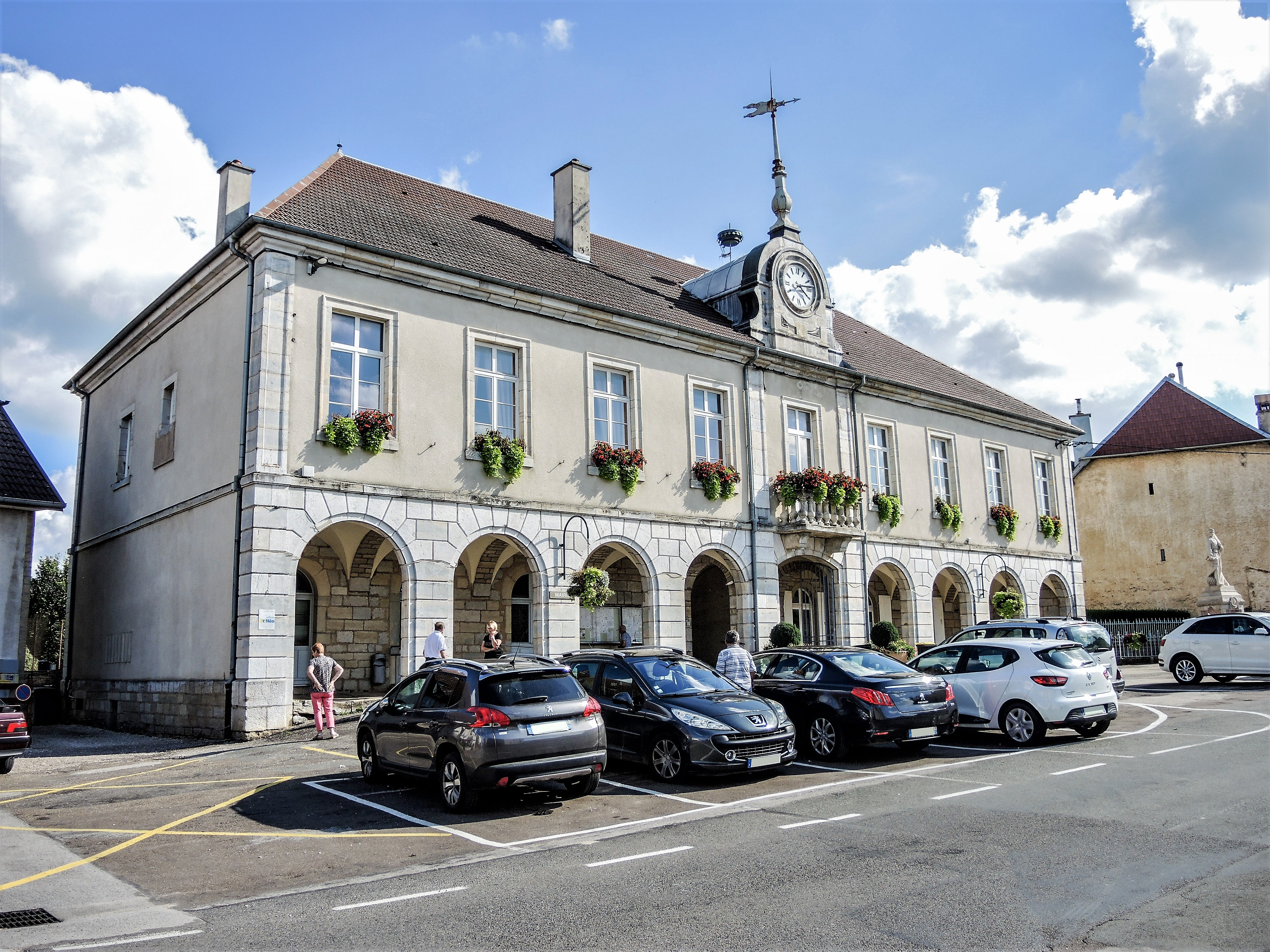
- The town hall in Sancey
- Location of Sancey
- Location within France Location within Bourgogne-Franche-Comté
- Coordinates: 47°17′46″N 6°35′02″E
- Country: France
- Region: Bourgogne-Franche-Comté
- Department: Doubs
- Arrondissement: Montbéliard
- Canton: Bavans

Government
  - Mayor (2020–2026): Frédéric Cartier
- Area^{1}: 30.57 km^{2} (11.80 sq mi)
- Population (2023): 1,385
  - Density: 45.31/km^{2} (117.3/sq mi)
- Time zone: UTC+01:00 (CET)
  - Summer (DST): UTC+02:00 (CEST)
- INSEE/Postal code: 25529 /25430
- ^{1} French Land Register data, which excludes lakes, ponds, glaciers > 1 km^{2} (0.386 sq mi or 247 acres) and river estuaries.

Sancey (French pronunciation: [sɑ̃sɛ]) is a commune in the Doubs department of eastern France. The municipality was established on 1 January 2016 and consists of the former communes of Sancey-le-Grand and Sancey-le-Long.

== See also ==
- Communes of the Doubs department
