= Pozzaglia Sabina =

- Comune
- Comune di Pozzaglia Sabina
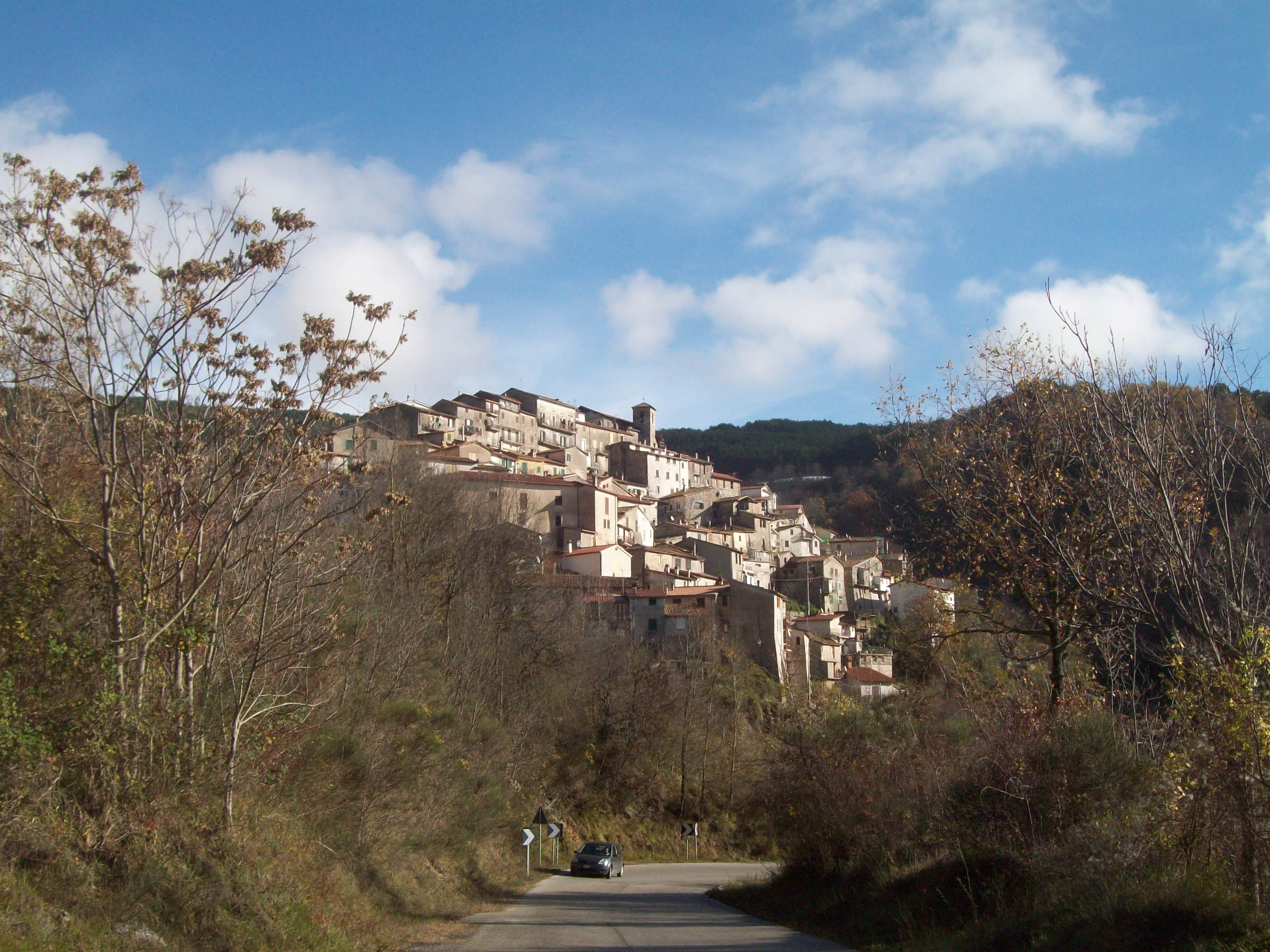
- View of Pozzaglia Sabina

- Coat of arms

- Location within Italy Location within Lazio
- Coordinates: 42°10′N 12°58′E
- Country: Italy
- Region: Lazio
- Province: Rieti (RI)

Government
  - Mayor: Massimo Mulieri

Area
  - Total: 25.2 km^{2} (9.7 sq mi)
- Elevation: 878 m (2,881 ft)

Population (31 December 2010)
  - Total: 368
  - Density: 14.6/km^{2} (37.8/sq mi)
- Demonym: Pozzagliesi
- Time zone: UTC+1 (CET)
  - Summer (DST): UTC+2 (CEST)
- Postal code: 02030
- Dialing code: 0765
- Website: Official website

Pozzaglia Sabina is a comune (municipality) in the Province of Rieti in the Italian region of Lazio, located about 50 kilometres (31 mi) northeast of Rome and about 25 kilometres (16 mi) southeast of Rieti.

Among the landmarks in the town is the church of San Nicola di Bari and the Romanesque church of Santo Stefano Protomartire.
