= Sisters of Divine Charity =

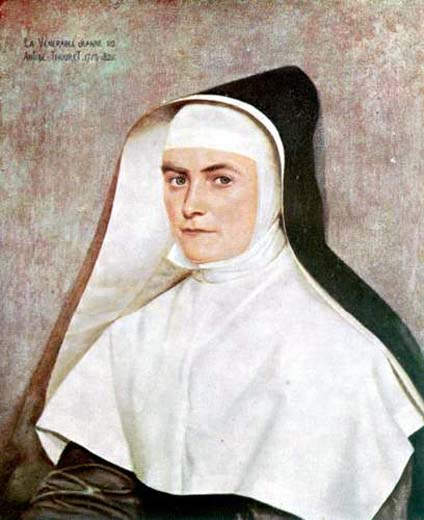
Jeanne-Antide Thouret, foundress of the congregation

The Sisters of Divine Charity were founded at Besançon in France, in 1799, by a Vincentian Sister, Jeanne Antide Thouret.

== Description ==
The mother house, originally at Naples, was later moved to Rome, and there were filial establishments in Italy, in Malta, and Gozo. The sisters were in charge of schools, orphanages, hospitals, and insane asylums.

== See also ==
- Sisters of Charity
