= Asmundo family =

Sicilian noble family

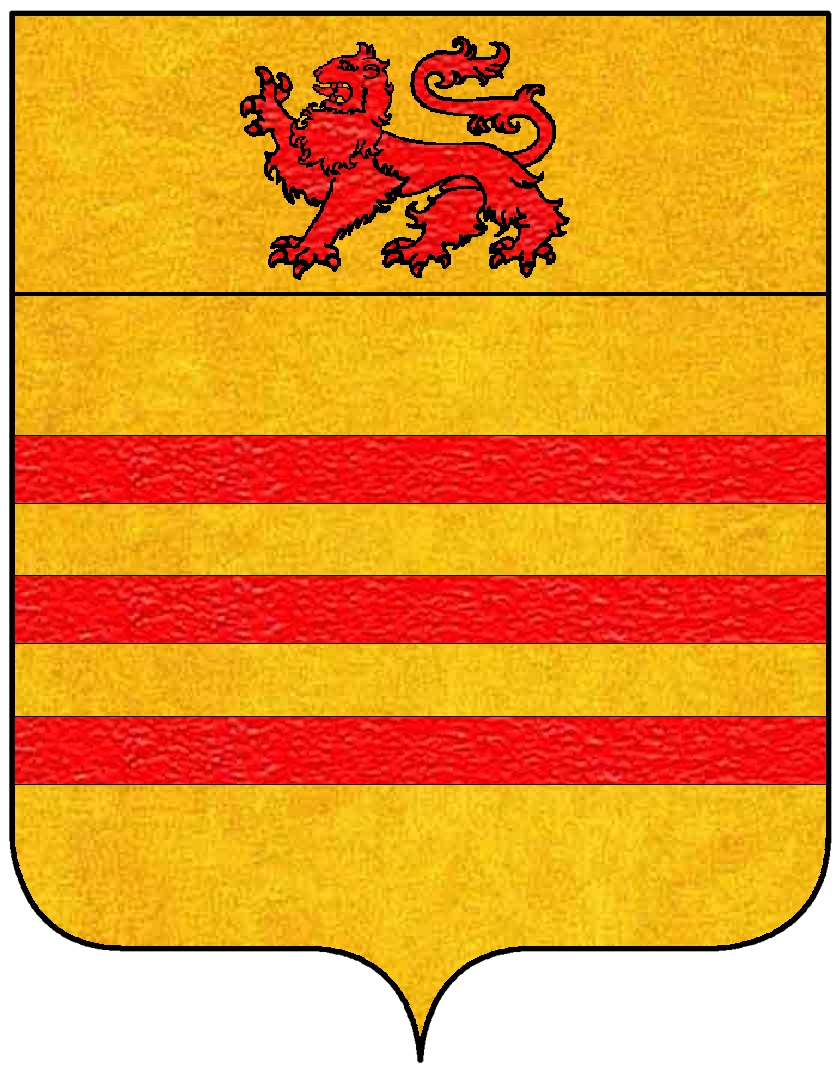
Asmundo coat of arms

Asmundo is an old Sicilian noble family that has played a notable role in the island's political, cultural, and economic history.

== Origins ==
The ancient origins of the Asmundo family are muddled in legends. According to some sources, originating from Pisa, also known as Sismondo or Sismondi since the time of Charlemagne, the family would have arrived in Sicily at the time of the Norman conquest by Count Roger. In this case, they would be connected with the Pisan Sismondi family, mentioned by Dante Alighieri in the Divine Comedy, which included Sigismondo, who became Prior of the Republic of Pisa in 774, and the legendary heroine Kinzica de' Sismondi. Others think they originated from Malta and moved to Sicily at the time of the Sicilian Vespers. Their lineage may be descended from the Asmunds, kings of Sweden before the year 1000.

== History ==
Members of various branches of the Asmundo family occupied important administrative positions in the Kingdom of Sicily, ever since the time of the Aragonese. Adamo Asmundo, doctor in civil law at the University of Padua, was rationum magister (master of finances) at the Court of Royal Property and luogotenente generale. In 1432 he took part in the special Royal Council that governed the island during the absence of King Alfonso V, who was on his expedition to Djerba. In the same year he became President of the Realm with viceregal functions until 1435, a position that he would again attain in 1439 and 1449, under King Alfonso.

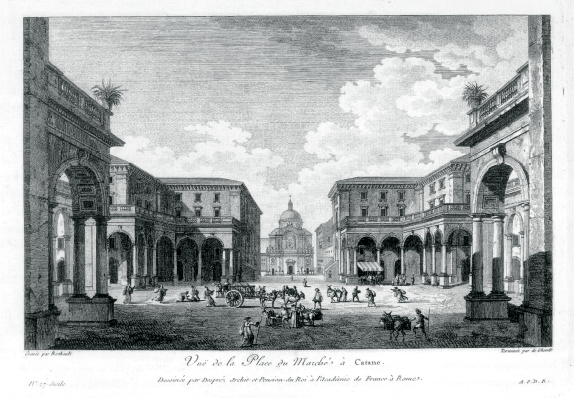
The present Piazza Mazzini, Catania drawn by the Abbé de Saint-Non (1727–1791). To the southeast is the Asmundo Palace of Gisira.

The Asmundo family possessed many titles and fiefdoms, including the castellan domains of Aci, Taormina, and Mazzara, and the fiefs of Jace, Baldirone, Pontalica, Callura, Missanèllo, Lamia, Targia, Xirumi, Troina, Capici, Militello, Alcara, Salomone, Ameda, Salandra, San Giuliano, Campopetro, Villasmundo, San Dimitri, Gisira, and Scalarancio. The wealth and privilege of the Asmundos allowed them to play important roles in the political and cultural history of Sicily.

In 1434, Adamo Asmundo, along with Battista Platamone, founded the University of Catania, one of the oldest still extant universities in the world. Among the first lecturers in theology appointed by Viceroy Lope Ximénez de Urrea y de Bardaixi in 1445 was the Carmelite Nicola Asmundo, a graduate of the University of Bologna.

Bartolomeo Asmundo, a senator of Catania from 1492 to 1532, was a reformer of studies at the city's university from 1495 to 1497. He is considered the first lyric poet of Sicily and one of the greatest poets in the Sicilian language. His fame is connected with some canzoni on sacred and profane themes inspired by Petrarchism, translated from Sicilian into Italian by Pietro Bembo (1470–1547). His achievements include characterizing the canzuna as a major poetic form as distinct from the sonnet, and promoting Sicilian as a sublime language of poetry.

Following the 1693 Sicily earthquake that devastated Catania and the Val di Noto, Giuseppe Asmundo was a leader in the urban and cultural rebirth in the affected areas. In Catania, among other works, he rebuilt the orphan girls' school Conservatorio delle Verginelle, and contributed, through the prior Bartolomeo Asmundo, to the construction of the church of the Immacolata Concezione ai Minoritelli. In Noto, he was the commissioner general for reconstruction. Together with Giuseppe Lanza (vicar general for the Val di Noto), Giovanni Montalto, Sipione Coppola, and the Jesuit architect Angelo Italia, he was one of the architects of the form of renaissance that took the name Sicilian Baroque.

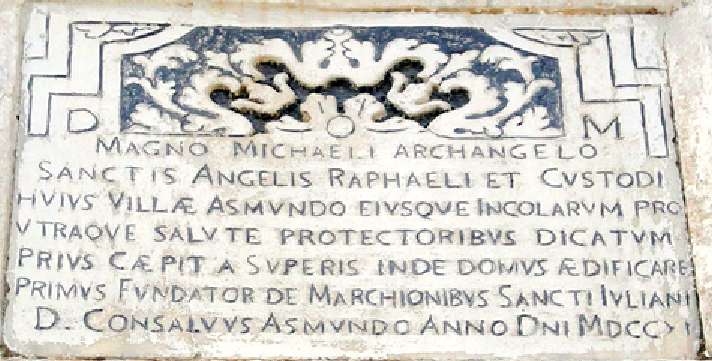
Dedication to Saint Michael the Archangel, Villasmundo

In 1701, Consalvo Asmundo received from King Philip V a licentia populandi (concession to populate a fief) to construct a center of habitation near the Villa Asmundo in the fief of San Giuliano. First, construction was begun of the Church of Saint Michael the Archangel, completed in 1711, and then the houses. Villasmundo, by request of the founder, received legal recognition in 1715.

In the first half of the 19th century, Giuseppe Asmundo Cirino di Gisira was one of the members of the Decurionate (city council) of Catania, to whom is owed the completion of the seaport, crucial for the city's economic development and for its economic supremacy in eastern Sicily. Among the works of patronage of the arts by the Catania Decurionate, that of 1819 in favor of the composer Vincenzo Bellini has remained celebrated.

Michele Scammacca Asmundo and Francesco Asmundo were president and vice-president of the administrative council of the Sicilian Public Works Company founded in 1886. The company began its work building the Ferrovia Circumetnea in 1889. The route around Mount Etna that connects Riposto to the Port of Catania, going through the towns at the foot of Etna, became completely accessible in 1898.

At the beginning of the twentieth century, Giuseppe Zappalà Asmundo and his wife Anna Grimaldi Francica Nava were among the promoters of the Sicilian Belle Époque. In 1910, they created the Teatro Minimo in the halls of their palazzo, a rare example of a private theater where shows by Catanian authors are produced, some directed by Giovanni Verga. In 1934, they donated to the Museo Civico at Castello Ursino a collection of paintings, archaeological finds, porcelains, majolicas, antique arms, coins, and decorative arts, among which are Amati and Goffriller violins. Together with the Benedettini collection and that of Ignazio Paternò Castello, the Zappalà Asmundo collection forms a significant part of the nucleus of art works curated by Catania's Museo Civico.

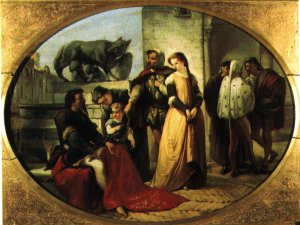
Provenzano Salvani in the Piazza of the Campo (painted c.1856 by Bernardo Celentano) donated by Asmundo familyt o Museo civico al Castello Ursino, Catania

== Asmundo women ==
In the family's history, the role of the women has had notable significance. Adriana Filingeri, when her husband Adamo Asmundo died in 1459, took over management of their fiefs as the guardian of their son Nicolò Antonio. Ignazia Asmundo was abbess of San Benedetto Monastery; under her governance in 1704–1707, construction of the Church of San Benedetto in Catania was begun on Via dei Crociferi. Marianna Asmundo, mother of the writer Federico de Roberto, with her strong and possessive personality, exercised great influence over her son's life and artistic work. In the early 20th century Anna Zappalà Asmundo, niece of Cardinal Giuseppe Francica-Nava, distinguished herself by her philanthropic work in Catania.

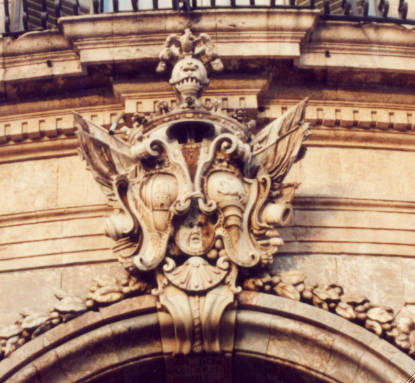
Coats of arms of the Paternò Castello and Asmundo families, Palazzo San Giuliano, Catania

== Relations with other families ==
The families that the Asmundos have been directly connected with are, among others: di Castro, Filangeri, Gioeni, Gravina, Grimaldi, Landolina, Platamone, Rizzari, Rosso, Sammartino Pardo, Spatafora, Speciale, Stagno d'Alcontres, and Tedeschi. One of Adamo Asmundo's daughters, Allegranza, married Giovanni Paternò, Chamberlain of the Kingdom of Sicily and Stratigotus of Messina, in 1470. With this union began the connection between the Asmundo and Paternò families, continued for centuries with numerous marriages, including those of Francesco Asmundo Cutelli with Olivia Paternò Marchisana (c. 1623), of Michele Asmundo Mendicino with Agata Paternò Lazzari (1654), of Baldassare Asmundo Cutelli with Eleonora Paternò Castello, (1679), of Maria Silvia Asmundo Romeo (Consalvo Asmundo's sister) with Giovan Battista Paternò Abbatelli (1683) from which derives the Asmundo Paternò branch of the family, of Giulia Asmundo Joppolo with Antonino Paternò Castello (1702), and of Silvia Asmundo Asmundo with Giuseppe Alvaro Paternò (1814).

== Asmundo Paternò ==
The Asmundo Paternò family is a cadet branch of the Sicilian noble House of Paternò. Giuseppe Asmundo Paternò (1694–1772), the heir to his maternal uncle Consalvo Asmundo on condition of taking the surname and arms of the Asmundo family, was president of the Consistory Courts and of the Supreme Magistrate of Commerce. Giovanni Battista Asmundo Paternò (1720–c. 1805) was Judge of the Royal Grand Court, honorary rationum magister (master of finances) of the Royal Property Court, and acting consultant of the Council of Sicily in Naples. In 1787 he became President (assistant viceroy) of the Realm of Sicily. Emanuele Paternò (Asmundo Paternò) (1847–1935) a chemist and politician, was President of the Società Italiana delle Scienze, senator, and vice-president of the Senate of the Kingdom of Italy.

== Other representatives ==
- Nicola Asmundo, Carmelite prior and theologian, penitentiary of the pope Niccolò V (1449)
- Nicolò Antonio Asmundo, Captain of Justice and Patrician of Catania (1447, 1449, 1454, 1465, 1469, and 1480)
- Federico Asmundo, Judge of the Royal Grand Court and Rationum Magister of the Court of Royal Property (1447)
- Girolamo Asmundo, Bishop of Patti (1546)
- Francesco Asmundo Spatafora, Captain of Justice (1595–1596) and Patrician of Catania (1601)
- Girolamo Asmundo Alessandrano Spatafora e Lanza, Captain of Justice (1634–1635) and Patrician of Catania (1644–1645)
- Ignazio Asmundo Amico, Patrician of Catania (1657–1658)
- Girolamo Asmundo Paternò, Captain of Justice, Patrician, and Senator of Catania (c. 1669)
- Francesco Asmundo Romeo, Captain of Justice of Catania (1680)
- Girolamo Asmundo Tedeschi, Captain of Justice of Catania (1707–1708, 1715–1716)
- Michele Asmundo Landolina di Gisira, Captain of Justice (1719), Patrician (1725), and Senator of Catania (1727 and 1730)
- Giuseppe Asmundo Asmundo di Gisira, Captain of Justice (1741), Patrician (1743), and Senator of Catania (1748 and 1762)
- Adamo Benedetto Asmundo San Martino di Gisira, Captain of Justice (1772) and Senator of Catania (1780 and 1784)
- Gaetano Asmundo Paternò Castello, Vicar Capitular of Catania (1862)
- Antonio Sapuppu Asmundo, Mayor of Catania (1893, 1895, 1899, 1916, and 1925)
