= San Camillo dei Mercedari, Catania =

Roman Catholic church in Catania, Sicily

Coordinates: 37.5057°N 15.0844°E

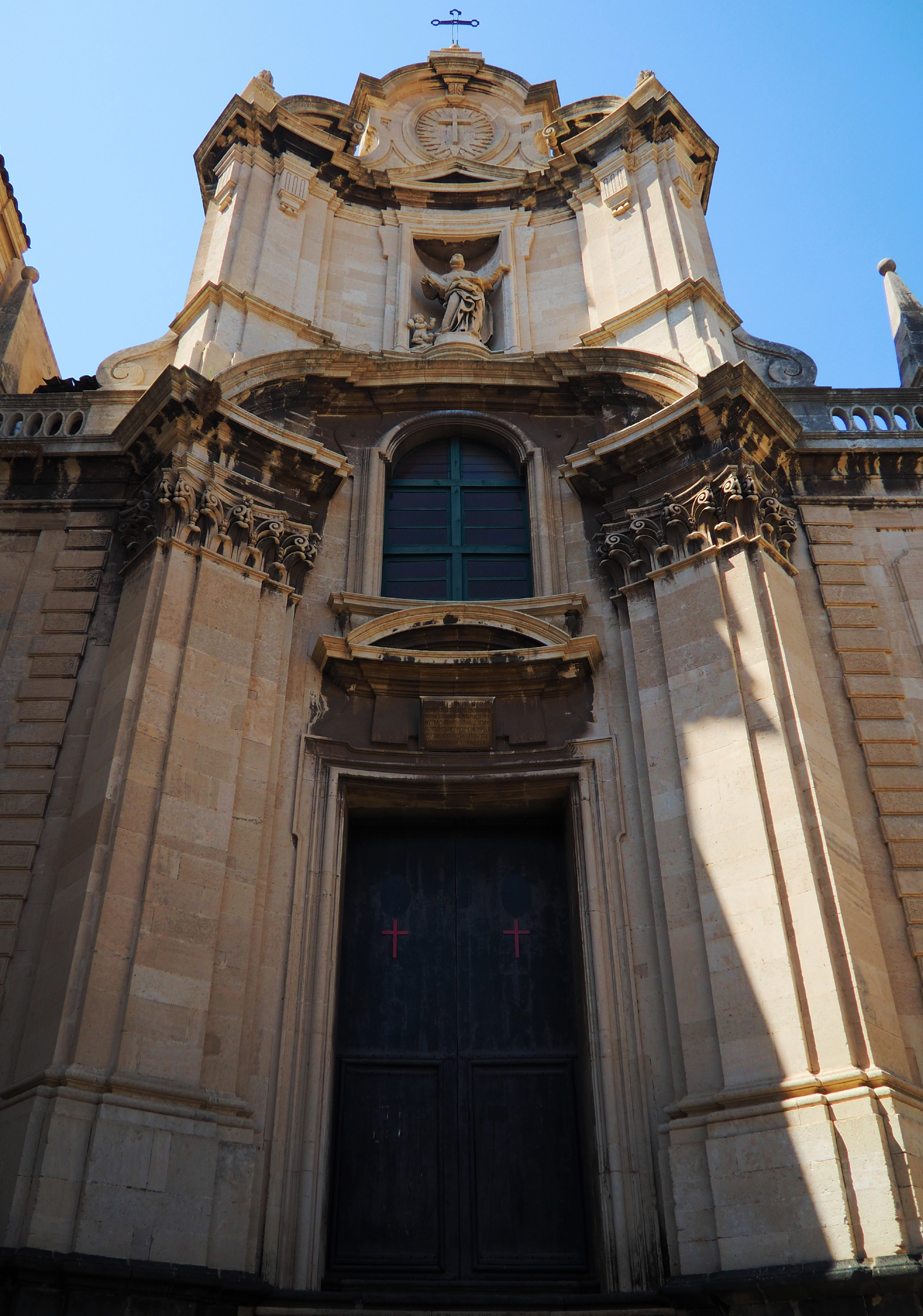
Church of San Camillo dei Mercedari

San Camillo dei Mercedari, also called San Camillo de Lellis after its titular saint, or San Camillo ai Crociferi after the founding monastic order founded by Camillo de Lellis, the Camillians known popular as the Crociferi, which also gives name to the street which it faces, via Crociferi. Located on #71, is a Roman Catholic church located in the piazza of the same name in Catania, Sicily, southern Italy; the church is one of four major baroque church-monasteries on this street, the others being San Francesco Borgia (Jesuit), San Giuliano, and San Benedetto (both the latter, Benedictine nuns).

== History and description ==
Near this site, prior to the devastating 1693 earthquake, was a small church titled Santa Maria della Dagala, belonging to a confraternity. During the urban renewal following the earthquake, the confraternity of the Dagala church, joined with the local Camillian order, under the patronage of bishop Pietro Galleti, to build a new church dedicated to Saint Camillo de Lellis.

The initial design appears to have been by one of two Camillians, Domenico L Barbera or Vincenzo Caffarelli, but with contributions by Francesco Battaglia by 1735, but he is not associated with construction until 1771 until 1788.

The facade is made with white stone from Siracusa. The concave center is flanked by a fusion of corinthian pilasters.In the niche above the portal and a window, is the statue of St Camillo. the skyline is decorated with pinnacles and urns. On the door is the red cross of the Camillan order, which is dedicated to ministering to the sick. The symbol is reiterated atop in the tympanum.

Behind the portal is a small vestibule, it leads into the oval nave. A decorated second story choir rises at the rear of the nave. The walls are decorated with gilded stucco. The interior houses a silver bust of St Camillus, and an altarpiece of the Ecstasy of San Camillo (1733) by Antonino Pennisi.
