= Military Order of the Collar =

Dynastic order

Military Order of the Collar of Saint Agatha of Paternò Ordine Militare del Collare di Sant’Agata dei Paternò
- Type: Dynastic
- Established: 1289 (reestablished 1851)
- Royal house: House of Paternò
- Religious affiliation: Catholic Church
- Seat: Chiesa di Santa Maria di Gesù, Catania
- Ribbon
- Motto: Impavidus pavidum firmo (English: Although fearful, I remain resolute and stand firm.)
- Status: Currently constituted
- Grand Master: H.R.H. Don Francesco Paternó Castello
- Grand Chancellor: Prince don Stephen Screech
- Grades: Knight Officer (Grace and Devotion & Justice and Devotion); Commander; Grand Officer; Knight Grand Cross; Grand Collar
- Post-nominals: MOC
- Website: https://real-aragon.org/

The Military Order of the Collar (MOC), officially the Military Order of the Collar of Saint Agatha of Paternò (Italian: Ordine Militare del Collare di Sant’Agata dei Paternò), is a dynastic order of knighthood of the House of Paternò, founded in 1289 by King Alfonso III of Aragon.

== History ==
On the 23rd of January 1289, the Military Order of the Collar was founded by King Alfonso III of Aragon, with the intention of serving as a knightly order to protect Minorca. Historian Dick Harrison states that this date, and much of the history before 1850, is unknown, however many of the Order's traditions can be verified by other written sources.

In May of 1851, the revival of the Order of the Collar was prompted after a publication on the Order's History was published by Don Francesco Maria Giuseppe, 7th Duke of Carcaci. At this time, the 7th Duke of Carcaci also served as part of the King of the Two Sicilies Household, as one of his Valet de chambre.

As early as 1853, documents from the Kingdom of the Two Sicilies explicitly accept the legitimacy of the Order's existence and revival, using the title of "Most Serene Grand Collar Regent Grand Master of the Order of the Collar of Paternò" when referring to the then Grand Master of the Order. Professor Dick Harrison writes that, from a historical view, it is clear that the Kingdom of the Two Sicilies viewed the Order of the Collar as 'on par' with their own dynastic orders.

In one decree signed by Ferdinand II, King of the Two Sicilies in June 1853, it confirms the Kingdom's position on the legitimacy of the Order. Later, in the reign of Francesco II of the Two Sicilies, Don Mario Paternò Castello e Guttadauro, Duke of Carcaci, is further recognized as the legitimate head of the Order of the Collar, as well as having the rights to himself bestow nobiliary titles, as well as granting the title of 'Prince of Val d'Emmanuel' to his himself and his heirs.. In the same year, the Governor of the Province of Catania, acting on behalf of the King of the Two Sicilies, ruled that only three orders of knighthood were permitted to be worn officially in Sicily, those being the Knighthoods conferred by the Holy See, the Order of Malta, and the Military Order of the Collar.

In 1995, the MOC Foundation was founded in the United Kingdom, as a charity working to further poverty relief and education both domestically and internationally.. The charity currently operates in Westminster, India, and Malawi.

In 2008, the Order celebrated the 800th anniversary of the birth of James I, the founder of the Order of the Collar, in Palma, Spain. The Grand Master, Prince Francesco Paternò, oversaw the celebrations, including the investiture of new Knights of the Order.

In 2026, the Grand Master, His Royal Highness Francesco Paternò Castello, and the Governor of the Royal House, Don Marcello Cocuccio, were made Knights of the Pontifical Equestrian Order of St. Gregory the Great, an order of knighthood of the Holy See, by Pope Leo XIV.

== Magistral seat ==
The Magistral Seat of the Military Order of the Collar is located at the Chiesa di Sant'Anna (Church of Saint Anna) in Catania, Italy

The magistral seat of the Order is the Church of Saint Anna in Catania, Italy. Rebuilt in 1693 after a horrific earthquake devastated the area, the church was worshipped in faithfully before being confiscated due to anti-clerical reforms in the region. The Church was sold by the city to the Mauro family, who demolished the parish and rebuilt it, appointed Don Giuseppe Filogamo, a minor canon of the local Cathedral, as its chaplain. In 1866, the Church was opened for public worship.

== Notable members ==
- Princess Kerstin von Liechtenstein, wife of Prince Hanno (Johannes) von Liechtenstein
- Andrew Jamieson, heraldic artist and designer of the invitation for the Coronation of King Charles III
- Archbishop George Stack, Archbishop Emeritus of Cardiff
