= Roman Theatre of Catania =

Ancient Roman theater in Catania, Italy

Coordinates: 37°30′09″N 15°05′02″E

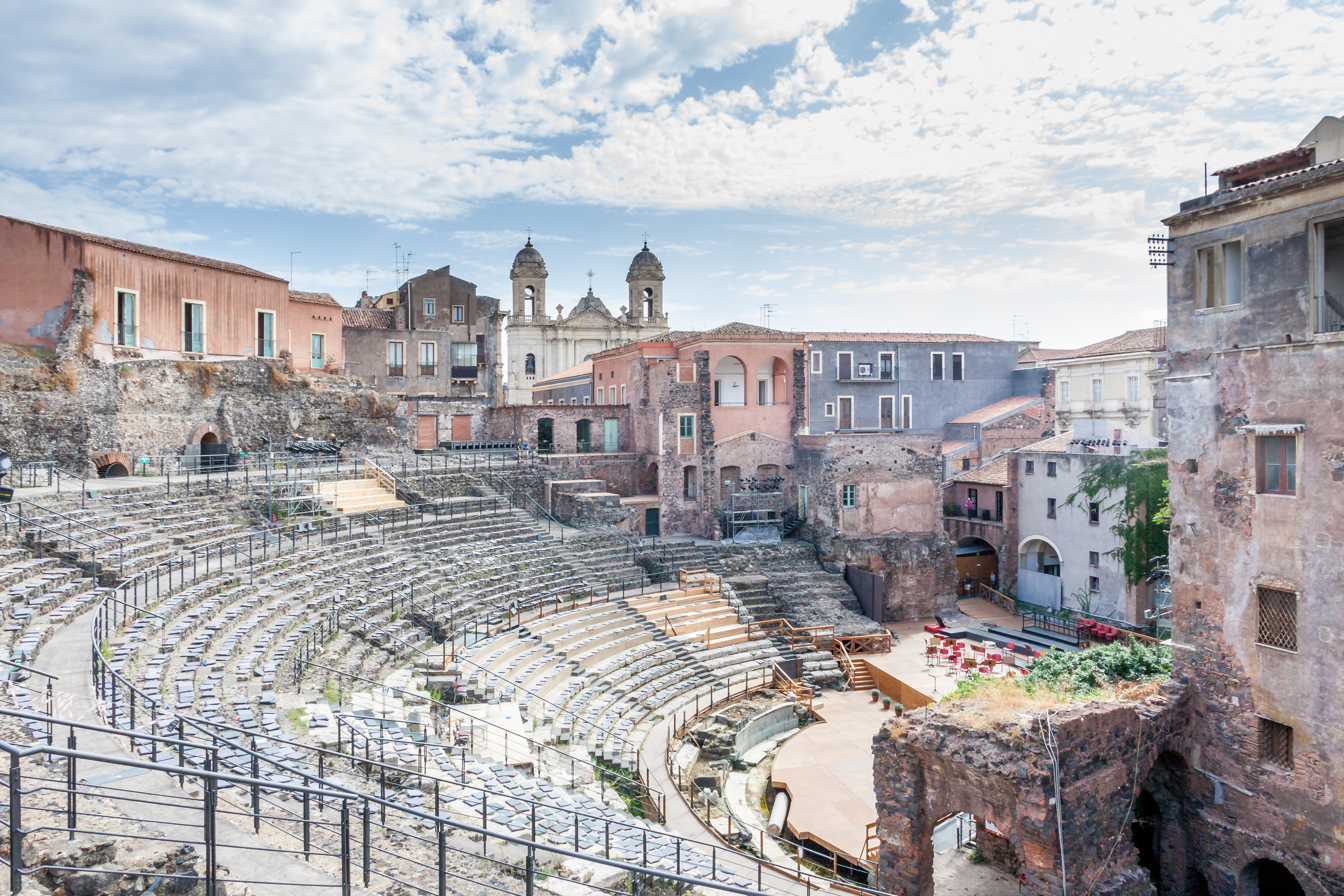
View of the larger theater, in the center background are the bell-towers and facade of the church of San Francesco and the grey walls of the rear of the Museo Civico Belliniano

The Roman Theatre of Catania (Teatro Romano di Catania) consists of the ruins of two open-air semicircular ancient Roman theatres, located between Piazza San Francesco, via Vittorio Emanuele, via Timeo, and via Teatro Greco in the center of Catania, Sicily, southern Italy. The site consists of a larger theatre and a smaller semicircular theatre, an Odeon. The structure is part of the Parco archeologico greco-romano di Catania.

== History ==
This structure was probably built in the second century AD and only fully excavated in the 19th century. The theatre follows a common design of many ancient Roman theatres. It was built with seats rising along the hillside, where spectators would have faced south and towards the sea. It likely had a scaenae frons decorated with marble columns, that gave it depth and complexity. The orchestra or stage section had a diameter of nearly 22 meters. The auditorium (cavea section) originally measured 98 meters deep, consisting of 21 rows of seats divided into wedges or cunae, seating nearly a maximum of 7000 spectators, smaller than the theatres at Taormina and Siracusa by 1,000-3,000 seats. Below the seats are the vomitoria or exit passageways.

The theatre ceased to be used between the 5th and 6th centuries. While archaeological work on the site began in the 18th century under the Ignazio Paternò Castello, Prince of Biscari, the site was not cleared of houses that had been built into the structure until 1959. Some of the marbles and artefacts recovered during excavations and restorations are on display in the adjacent Casa Pandolfo and Casa Liberti.
