= Conservatorio delle Verginelle di Sant'Agata =

Coordinates: 37.50308795200882°N 15.081231646451903°E

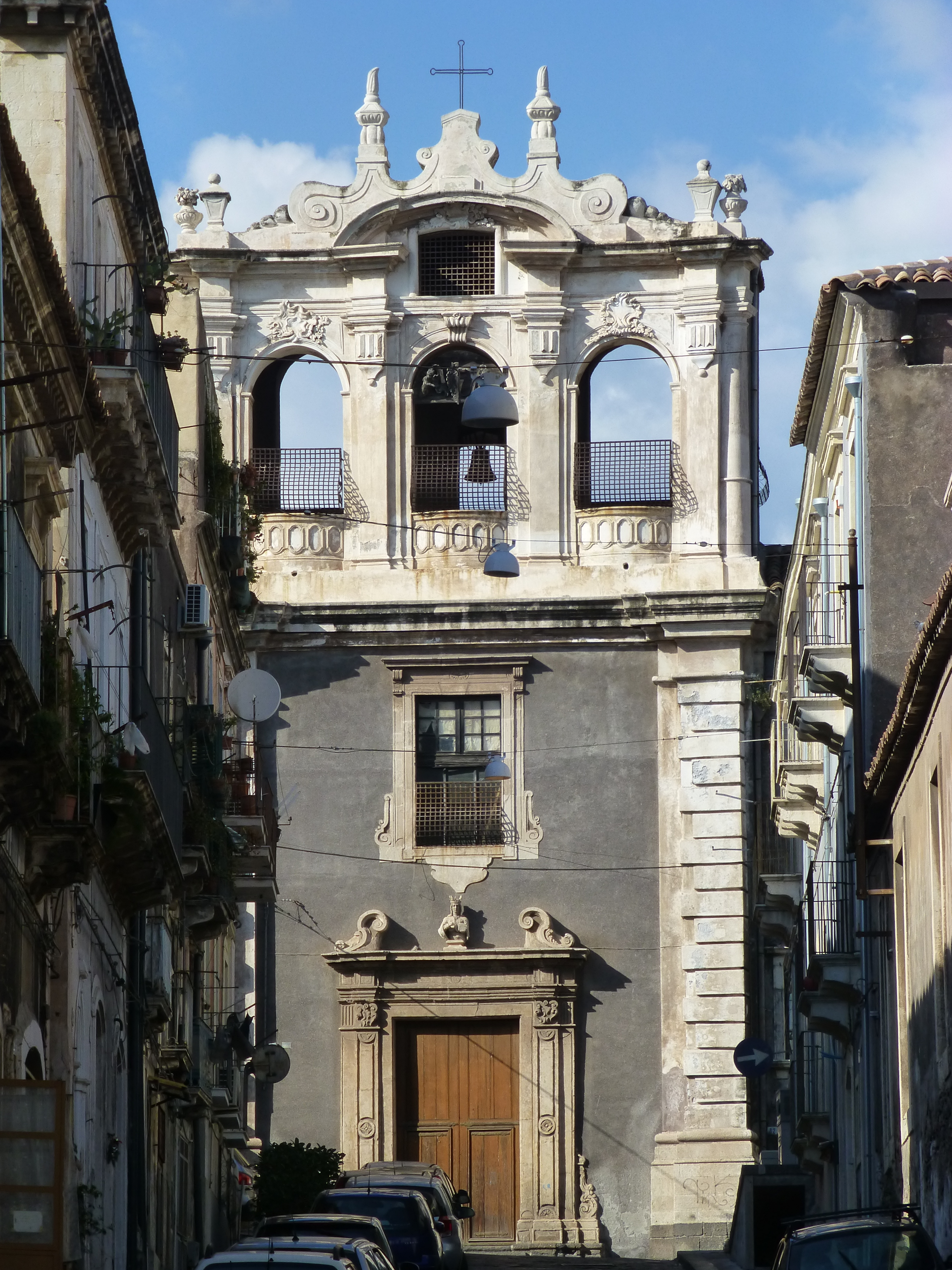
Church of the Verginelle

The Conservatorio delle Verginelle di Sant'Agata (Conservatory of the Young Virgins of St Agatha) is a former orphanage-hostel and church located on via Teatro Greco #82, with the northern facade paralleling Piazza Dante and the Monastery of San Nicolo l'Arena in the center of the city of Catania, region of Sicily, Italy. Presently it houses the facilities of the Faculty of the Scienza della Formazione of the University of Catania, educating future science teachers.

== History ==
A conservatory of this name was documented by 1586, with the aims of providing for young and poor abandoned girls, patronized by the aristocrat Giovanni La Rocca. The institution not only housed the girls, who were entering marriagable age, but also taught them a craft and prepared them for marriage with a small dowry. After the 1693 Sicily Earthquake flattened the prior structure, which was located near the present church of San Biagio in Piazza Stesicoro, the present buildings were erected circa 1720 under the patronage of the aristocrat Giuseppe Asmundo Mendicino, work continued by his heirs. The Asmundo family remained as directors into the 20th century. The church of Sant'Agata del Conservatorio delle Verginelle has a narrow, three-story facade on via Greco, with the top story having a three-arch veranda from which the girls could watch processions pass by.

A similar conservatory for girls in town was affiliated with the church of Santa Maria della Purità.
