= Sebastiano Lo Monaco =

== People ==
- Sebastiano Lo Monaco (1730–1775), Italian painter
- Sebastiano Lo Monaco (1958-2023), Italian actor of theatre, cinema and television

== See also ==
- Sebastián Lomónaco (born 1998), Argentine footballer
