= House of Paternò =

Sicilian princely family

House of Paternò Casato di Paternò
- Noble family
- Or, four pallets gules, a bend azure overall
- Parent family: House of Barcelona (traditional)
- Country: Kingdom of Arles; County of Sicily; Kingdom of Sicily; Crown of Aragon; Kingdom of Majorca; Kingdom of Naples; Kingdom of the Two Sicilies; Kingdom of Italy; Italy
- Etymology: From the town of Paternò
- Founded: 11th century
- Founder: Robert, Count of Embrun
- Titles: Prince of Biscari; Prince of Cerenzia; Prince of Valsavoia; Duke of Carcaci; Duke of Roccaromana; Duke of San Nicola; Duke of Pozzomauro; Marquess of Toscano; Marquess of Sessa; Marquess of San Giuliano; Marquess of Manchi di Bilici; Marquess of Regiovanni; Marquess of Spedalotto; Count of Montecupo; Count del Grado; Baron of Bicocca; Baron of Raddusa
- Motto: Impavidus Pavidum Firmo (Fearless, I strengthen the fearful)
- Properties: Palazzo Paternò di Biscari; Palazzo Paternò di San Giuliano; Palazzo Paternò del Toscano; Villa Spedalotto
- Branches: 11 extant lines

The House of Paternò is an ancient princely aristocratic house of the Kingdom of Sicily. Founded in the 11th century, it is listed as one of only four Sicilian families with over a millennium of history. Historically centred on Catania, the family divided into numerous branches, several of which held princely, ducal and marquessal titles across the Kingdoms of Sicily, Naples and Aragon.

== History ==
=== Origins ===
The House of Paternò was founded by Roberto, Count of Embrun (c. 1040–1100), a presumed member of the House of Barcelona (Kings of Aragon), who took part in the Norman conquest of Sicily under Roger I.

There are two accounts of how the family acquired its name:

- According to the Enciclopedia Italiana, during the Norman conquest of Sicily Roberto took the castle of Paternò, received its lordship and adopted the name of the town.
- According to the historian Antonio Varvaro Bruno, the surname was adopted by Roberto's son Constantine I, who had become Count of Buccheri. He married Maria, heiress of the county of Paternò and a granddaughter of Roger I of Sicily through his daughter Flandina, who had married Hugh of Jarzé. Given the importance of the marriage, Constantine I took his wife's territorial name as the family surname.

In either case, Roberto or Constantine I, having decided to settle permanently in Sicily and adopt a new name, thereby founding a cadet line, added a blue bend to their arms of the House of Barcelona as a mark of cadency denoting a junior branch.

The family's ties with the ruling Hauteville family were further strengthened through Constantine II (died 1168), son of Robert II and grandson of Constantine I. Constantine II was lord of Buccheri and count of Butera and Martana, counties which, according to Varvaro Bruno, were at the time granted only to persons of royal blood. He married Matilda, Countess of Avenel, a granddaughter of Rainulf of Alife and of his wife Matilda, sister of Roger II.

=== Medieval and early modern periods ===
The family lost standing under the Hohenstaufen rulers of Sicily, who persecuted the surviving members of the Norman dynasty and the families closely associated with it.

The family's position recovered after the Sicilian Vespers of 1282. Under the Aragonese kings, their distant cousins, and the later Spanish viceroys, it received numerous large and populous fiefs and rose to great authority in the Kingdom of Sicily. Between the 12th and 16th centuries it was invested with some sixty baronies.

The family also dominated the government of Catania. It was the oldest house enrolled in the city's mastra nobile, the register of nobles eligible for the senior municipal offices, and was able to exclude others from it. Members of the family sat among the city's senators almost without interruption: according to the heraldist Antonino Mango di Casalgerardo, from the early 15th century to the first half of the 19th not a year passed without a Paternò holding the office, a continuity also noted by the historian Denis Mack Smith. At the level of the kingdom, members of the family served on several occasions as President of the Kingdom, governing in the absence of a viceroy.

By the early 17th century the family held 48 fiefs carrying full criminal and civil jurisdiction (mero e misto imperio).

=== 18th and 19th centuries ===
The family contributed to the economic life of Sicily and also helped with several large projects, including:

- contributing to the establishment of the university of Catania and the city's harbour mole;
- founding or developing settlements including Mirabella Imbaccari, Raddusa and Biscari;
- introducing silk and linen manufacture;
- undertaking land reclamation works, including a canal on the Carcaci estate and an aqueduct-bridge over the Simeto.

Mack Smith also writes that in Catania the Prince of Biscari, as the city's leading citizen and principal employer, counted for more than any royal judge. He describes the prince as the creator of one of the finest private museums in the world, who brought in foreign craftsmen to promote the manufacture of linen and rum and, in one emergency, fed the city at his own expense for a month.

At the abolition of feudalism in Sicily in 1812, the family held about 80,000 hectares of land and five hereditary seats in the Sicilian Parliament, which was more than any other family in the kingdoms of Naples and Sicily.

=== Modern period ===
After Italian unification, members of the family were active in national politics. Antonino Paternò Castello, 8th Marquess of San Giuliano, served as Mayor of Catania, Ambassador to London and Paris, and Minister of Foreign Affairs. The chemist Emanuele Paternò was Mayor of Palermo from 1890 to 1892 and became a Senator of the Kingdom in 1890.

In 1987 Silvia Paternò di Spedalotto married Prince Amedeo, Duke of Aosta, at Villa Spedalotto in Bagheria. In 2022 the economist Riccardo Paternò di Montecupo became Grand Chancellor of the Sovereign Military Order of Malta.

=== Claim to the Crown of Aragon ===
From the mid-20th century, Francesco Mario Paternò Castello, a junior member of the Carcaci line, and his descendants have claimed to be heirs of the Crown of Aragon and confer honours through a Military Order of the Collar of Saint Agatha of Paternò. The claim is disputed by the other lines of the family, including by Fra Ernesto Paternò Castello di Carcaci.

The Order was recognised in 1853 by the Kingdom of the Two Sicilies through various documents signed on behalf of the King, Francesco II, including a explicit recognition of the title of the then Grand Master as "Most Serene Grand Collar Regent Grand Master of the Order of the Collar of Paternò".

== Branches ==
From the late 13th century the family divided into separate lines. A Spanish line, the Paternoy, is traced to Cipresso Paternò, who went to Aragon in 1292 in the service of King James II of Aragon, formerly King of Sicily. Established in Zaragoza, the line produced soldiers and royal officials of the Crown of Aragon: Sancho de Paternoy commanded troops of Peter IV of Aragon against Castile in 1357, during the War of the Two Peters, and Ciprés de Paternoy took part in the capture of Deza in 1429 and was godfather to the future Ferdinand the Catholic in 1453. Ciprés's son Sancho and grandson Gonzalo served in turn as maestre racional (chief auditor) of the Crown, and a later Gonzalo de Paternoy married Isabel de Aragón, daughter of the Count of Ribagorza. Through female lines, its descendants passed into several Spanish ducal houses. More than twentyfour further lines branched off in Sicily and Naples from the 14th century onwards, of which eleven survive, with the following titles. Noble titles have had no legal recognition in Italy since the Constitution of 1948.

1. Paternò di Roccaromana e del Toscano: Duke of Roccaromana; Marquess del Toscano; Marquess Paternò
2. Amico Paternò del Grado: Count del Grado
3. Asmundo Paternò di Sessa: Marquess of Sessa; Marquess Asmundo Paternò; Marquess Paternò; Baron of Villasmundo; Baron of Collabascia
4. Paternò Castello di Biscari: Prince of Biscari, Peer of the Realm and Royal Kinsman (Regio Consanguineo); Baron of Imbaccari; Baron of Mirabella; Baron of Aragona; Baron of Cuba and Sparacogna; Baron of Baldi; Baron of Sciortavilla
5. Paternò Castello di Carcaci: Duke of Carcaci and Peer of the Realm; Baron of Placa and Bajana
6. Paternò Castello di Bicocca: Baron of Bicocca (descended from the Princes of Biscari)
7. Paternò Castello di San Giuliano: Marquess of San Giuliano; Marquess of Capizzi; Baron of Pollicarini
8. Moncada Paternò Castello di Valsavoia: Prince of Valsavoia; Baron of Armiggi; Baron of Cugno Mezzano
9. Paternò di Raddusa: Marquess of Manchi di Bilici and Peer of the Realm; Marquess Paternò; Baron of Raddusa
10. Paternò Ventimiglia di Spedalotto: Marquess of Regiovanni; Marquess of Spedalotto; Count of Prades; Baron of Pettineo and Peer of the Realm; Baron of Alzacuda; Baron of Gallitano; Baron of Culcasi
11. Paternò di San Nicola e di Montecupo: Prince of Presicce; Prince of Cerenzia; Duke of San Nicola; Duke of Pozzomauro; Marquess Paternò; Marquess of Casanova; Count of Montecupo

"Peer of the Realm" refers to a hereditary seat in the Sicilian Parliament.

== Notable members ==
- Ignazio Paternò Castello (1719–1786), 5th Prince of Biscari, antiquarian. He founded the Museo Biscari in Catania, opened in 1757.
- Emanuele Paternò (1847–1935), 9th Marquess of Sessa, chemist, known for the Paternò–Büchi reaction; Mayor of Palermo and Senator of the Kingdom.
- Antonino Paternò Castello (1852–1914), 8th Marquess of San Giuliano, diplomat and Minister of Foreign Affairs of the Kingdom of Italy.
- Ernesto Paternò Castello di Carcaci (1882–1971), Lieutenant of the Grand Master of the Sovereign Military Order of Malta from 1955 to 1962.
- Riccardo Paternò (born 1945), 9th Count of Montecupo and 13th Prince of Cerenzia, economist; Grand Chancellor of the Sovereign Military Order of Malta since 2022.
- Silvia Paternò di Spedalotto (born 1953), of the Marquesses of Spedalotto, widow of Prince Amedeo, Duke of Aosta.
