= Lords, Barons and Princes of Biscari =

Prince of Biscari
- Coat of arms of the House of Paternò: Royal arms of Barcelona-Aragon differenced by a bendlet azure to signify cadet branch (Or, four pallets gules overall a bendlet azure)
- Creation date: 21 June 1633
- Created by: Philip IV of Spain, King of Sicily
- Peerage: Peerage of Sicily
- First holder: Agatino Paternò Castello, 1st Prince of Biscari
- Present holder: Don Ignazio Paternò Castello, 15th Prince
- Subsidiary titles: Baron of Biscari; Baron of Imbaccari e Mirabella; Baron of Aragona, Baron of Cuba; Baron of Sparacogna, Baron of Baldi; Baron of Sciortavilla; Lord of Gatta; Lord of Toscano; Lord of Mandrile e Marcato di Toscano; Lord of Bidani
- Seats: Palazzo Paternò Castello di Biscari alla Collegiata, Catania
- Former seats: Palazzo Paternò Castello di Biscari alla Marina; Palazzo Biscari, Mirabella Imbaccari; Castle of the Princes of Biscari, Acate
- Motto: Impavidus Pavidum Firmo

Prince of Biscari (Italian: Principe di Biscari) is a title in the Kingdom of Sicily, held by the head of one branch of the House of Paternò, a major Sicilian noble family, originally a cadet branch of the House of Barcelona.

The title was created by the grant of a Letters Patent from King Philip IV of Spain on 21 June 1633, which was bestowed upon the Baron of Biscari, Don Agatino Paternó Castello.

He is known chiefly for having raised the fief of Biscari out of the marshy valleys subject to deadly malaria and for marrying the daughter of the Baron Vincenzo Paternó Castello.

Agatino did not succeed to the title of baron or prince. He married the heiress of Vincenzo Paternó Castello, named Maria la Restia, and accordingly for their culture and times, assumed the rank and style of the first Prince of Biscari.

Their great-grandson, named Vincenzo, would become known for having restored the town, and especially the castle, after severe earthquake damage in 1693.

In 1938, the town of Biscari changed its name to Acate.

== Coat of arms ==
The coat of arms displayed by the princes of Biscari is: Royal arms of Aragon differenced by a bendlet azure (Or, four pallets gules overall a bendlet azure) (House of Paternò), impaling the canting arms of Castello: Azure, a castle double-towered argent supported by two dragons.

== Lords of Biscari ==
- Matteo Mazzone – 1408 (creation)
- Bernardo Caprera – 1410
- Antonio del Castello – 1416
- Corrado – 1453
- Gutierrez – 1465
- Guglielmo – 1479
- Giovanello (grandson of) – 1528
- Vincenzo – 1555
- Ferdinando – 1566

== Lords of Biscari (House of Paternò), 1578 ==
- Orazio Paternó Castello (son of Giovanello and Francesca del Castello) – 1578

== Barons of Biscari (House of Paternò), 1604 ==
- Francesco Paternó Castello – 1604
- Vincenzo Paternó Castello – 1609

== Princes of Biscari (House of Paternò), 1633 ==
- Agatino Paternò-Castello, 1st prince of Biscari since 1633 (1594–1675)
- Vincenzo Paternò-Castello, 2nd prince of Biscari (1630–1675)
- Ignazio Paternò-Castello, 3rd prince of Biscari (1651–1700)
- Vincenzo Paternò-Castello, 4th prince of (1685–1749)
- Ignazio Paternò-Castello, 5th prince of Biscari (1719–1786)
- Vincenzo Paternò-Castello, 6th prince of Biscari (1743–1813)
- Ignazio Paternò-Castello, 7th prince of Biscari (1781–1844)
- Roberto Vincenzo Paternò-Castello, 8th prince of Biscari (1790–1857)
- Francesco Vincenzo Paternò-Castello, 9th prince of Biscari (1816–1867)
- Roberto Vincenzo Paternò-Castello, 10th prince of Biscari (1860–1930)
- Roberto Vincenzo Paternò-Castello, 11th prince of Biscari (1872–1947)
- Giuseppe Paternò-Castello, 12th prince of Biscari (1908–19??)
- Ignazio Paternò-Castello, 13th prince of Biscari (1913–1965)
- Roberto Paternò-Castello, 14th prince of Biscari (1945–2023)
- Ignazio Paternò-Castello, 15th prince of Biscari (2023 – present)
