= Palazzo Gravina-Cruyllas =

Palace and museum

Coordinates: 37°30′09.8″N 15°05′03.7″E

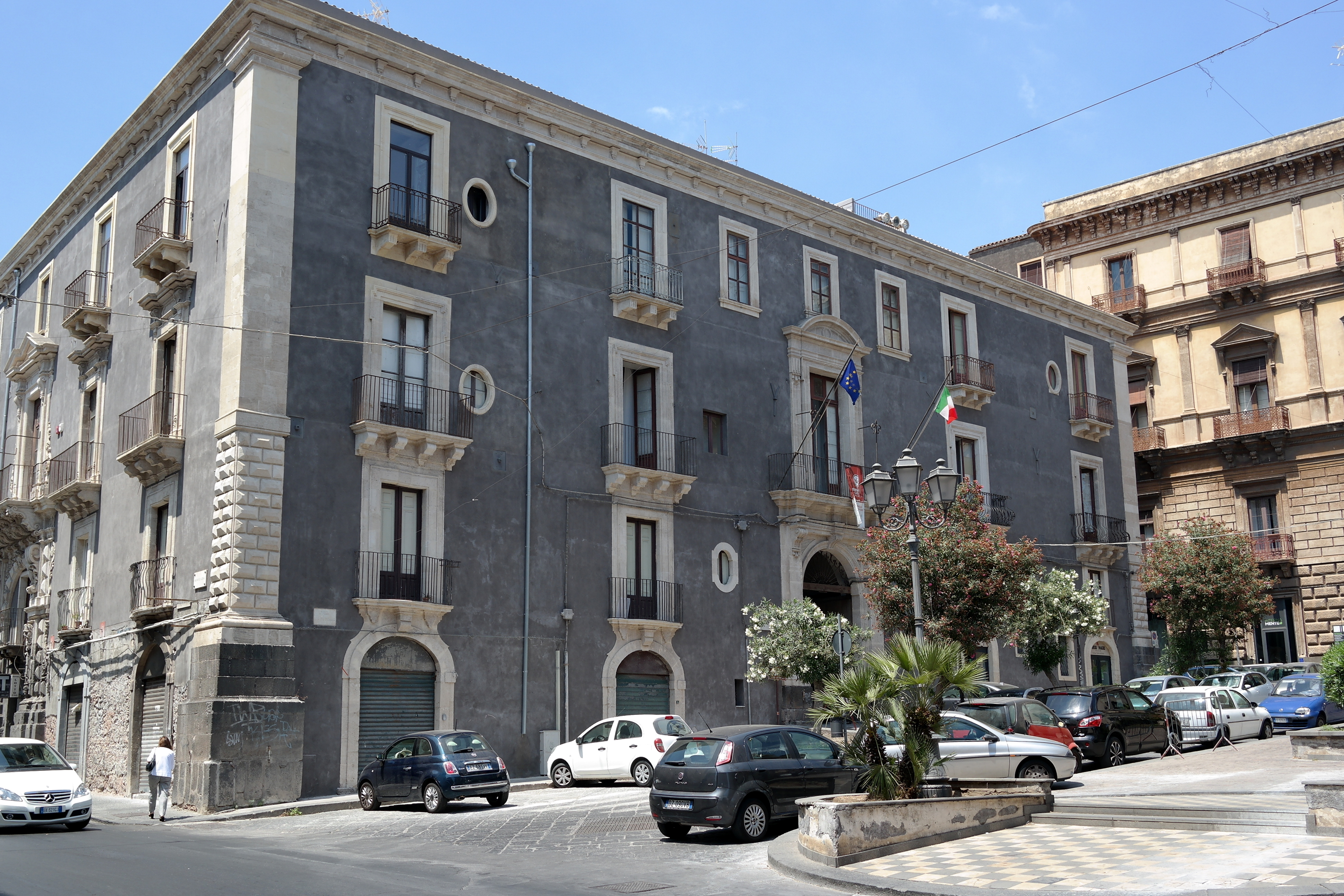
View of Palace

The Palazzo Gravina-Cruyllas is a palace located on the corner of Piazza San Francesco and Via Vittorio Emanuele (Il Corso), in the center of the city of Catania, Sicily, southern Italy. Vincenzo Bellini was born here, and the site now houses a museum dedicated to the opera composer: the Museo Civico Belliniano. The entrance stands across the piazza from the Monument to Blessed Giuseppe Dusmet and the church of San Francesco d'Assisi all'Immacolata.

== History and description ==
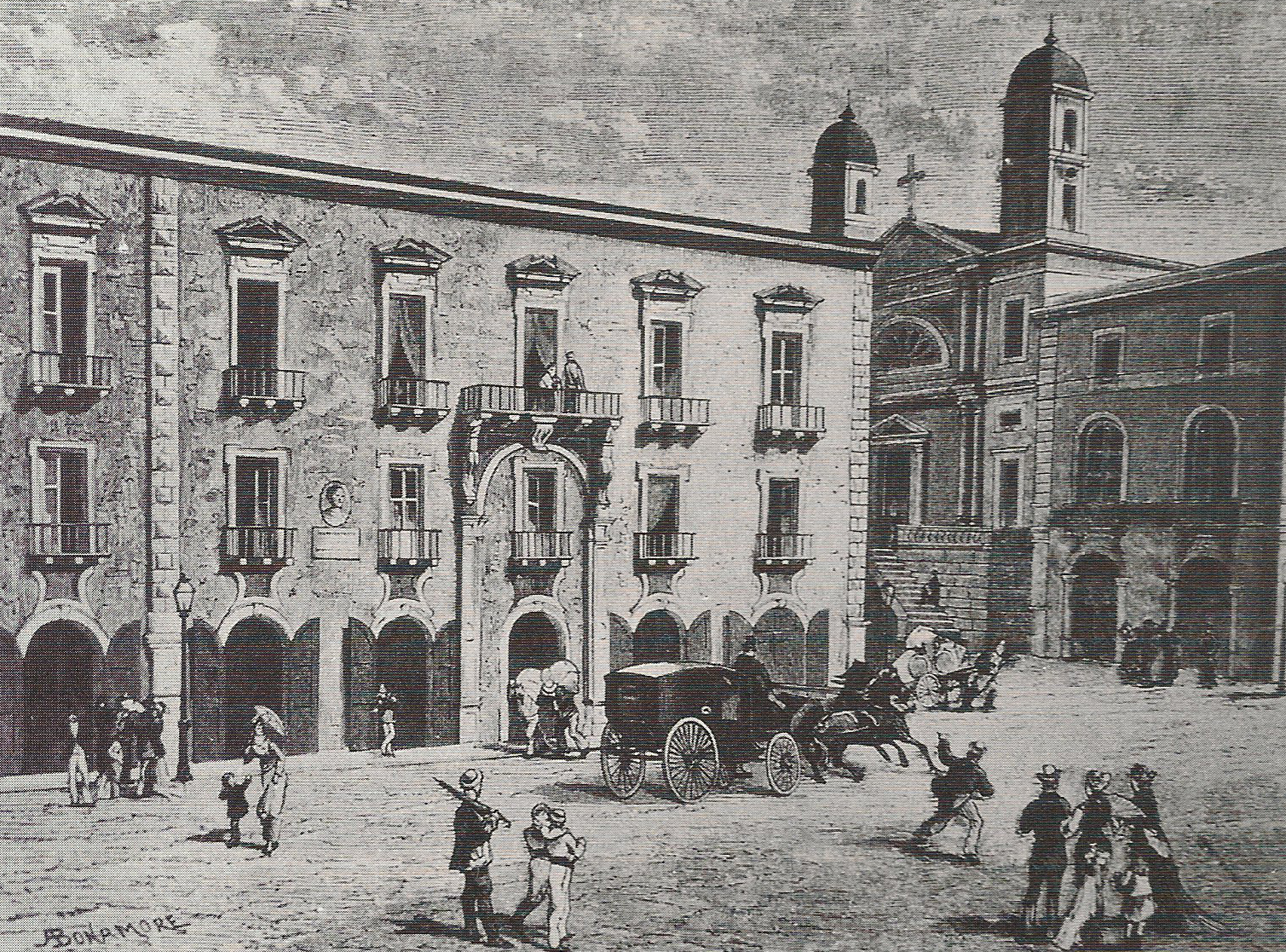
Palazzo dei Gravina Gruyas circa 1800

The prior palace of the aristocratic Gravina Cruyllas, Princes of Palagonia, was razed by the 1693 Sicily earthquake. The palace was rebuilt in the 18th-century, rising next to the ruins of the Teatro Romano. Originally, the main portal faced via Vittorio Emanuele, but now faces the piazza. The architect is unknown, but has similarities to the work of Francesco Battaglia. The building has undergone many modifications, including addition of a fourth floor after 1924. The house was declared a national monument in 1923, and inaugurated as a museum by 1930.

== Notes ==
- Derived from Italian wikipedia entry
