= San Francesco d'Assisi all'Immacolata, Catania =

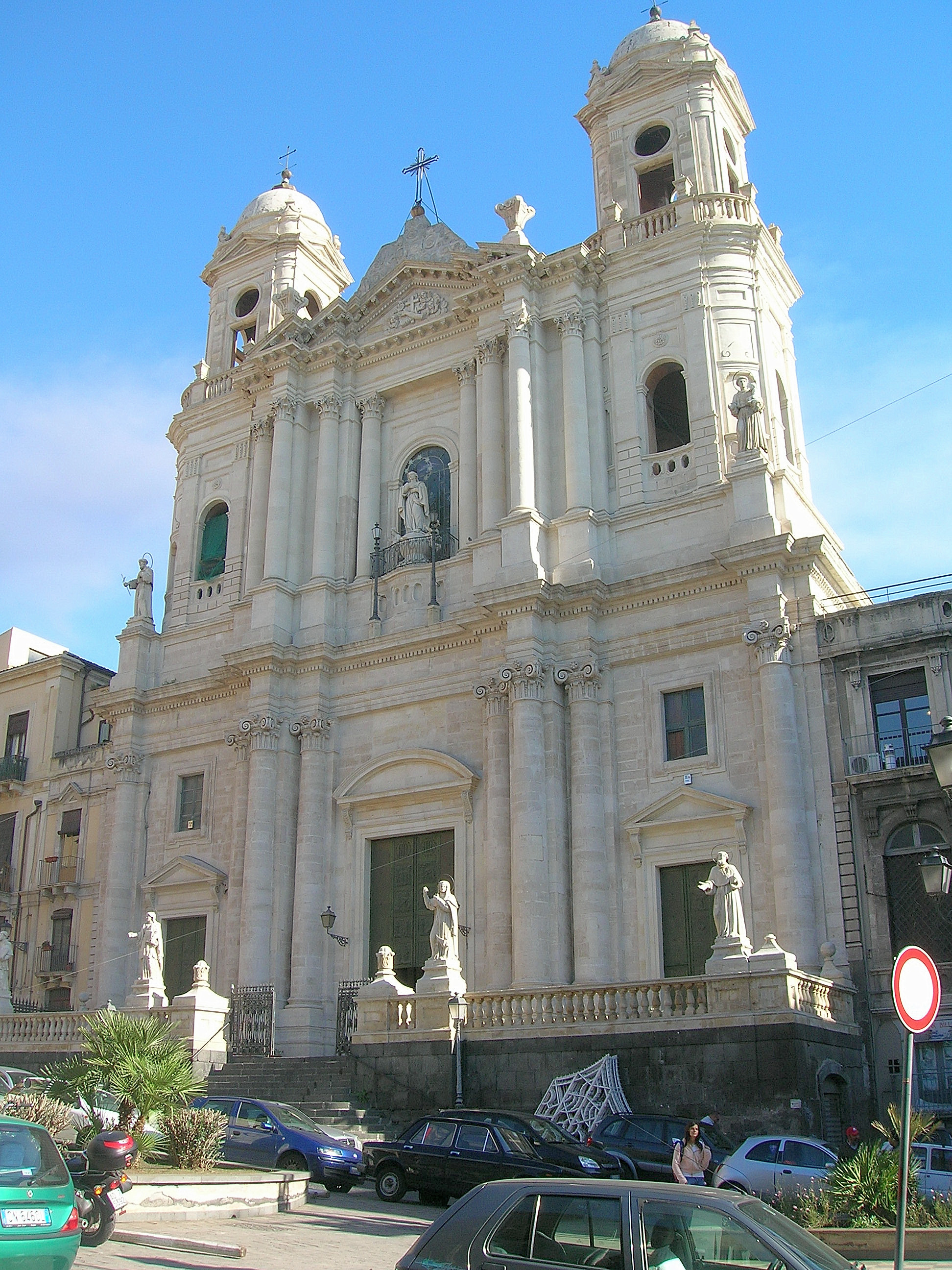
- San Francesco d'Assisi all'Immacolata, Catania
- 37.502795°N 15.08480°E
- Location: Catania, Sicily
- Denomination: Roman Catholic

San Francesco d'Assisi all'Immacolata is a Roman Catholic church in the city of Catania, Sicily, southern Italy.

== History and description ==
The construction of the first church at this site (1329) was promoted by Queen Eleanor of Anjou, wife of Frederick II of Aragon, and sister of the Franciscan friar and bishop, St Louis of Toulouse. This was the first Franciscan church in town. The Queen was buried here in 1343. Like most churches in town, it was wrecked by the 1693 sicily earthquake and rebuilt in the 17th-century. It contains an 18th-century canvas depicting the Queen and St Clare. The interior has paintings by P. Liotta, G. Rapisardi, G. Zacco. The apse has a fresco by Francesco Battaglia depicting St Francis praying at the Porziuncola. Vincenzo Bellini was born adjacent to this church in the Palazzo Gravina-Cruyllas, now a civic museum dedicated to the composer.

In front of the church is the Monument to Blessed Cardinal Giuseppe Dusmet.
