= Monument to Blessed Giuseppe Dusmet, Catania =

Coordinates: 37.50276°N 15.08464°E

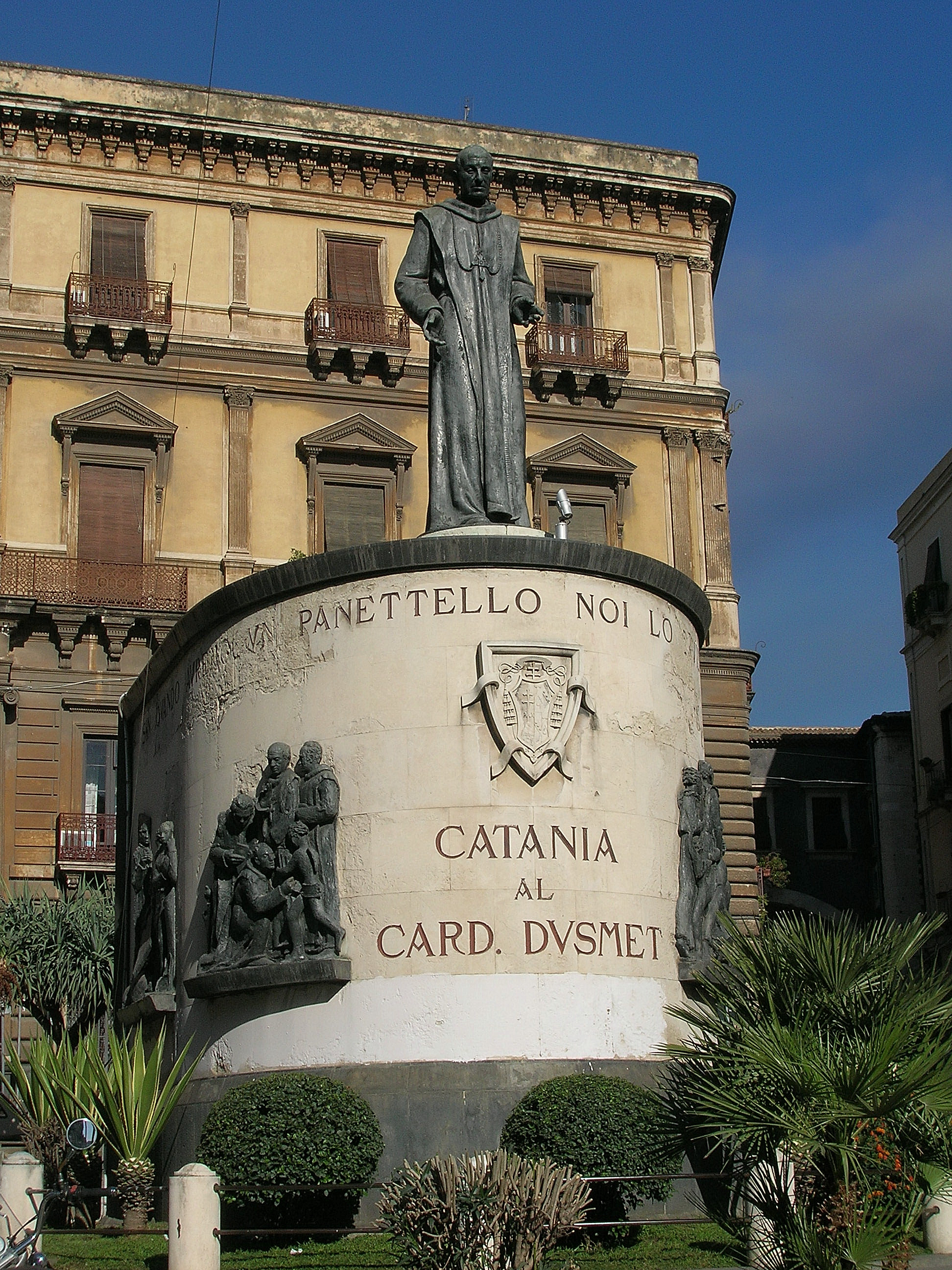
Monument to the Blessed Giuseppe Dusmet

The Monument to the Blessed Giuseppe Dusmet or Statua Cardinale Beato Dusmet is an outdoor monument and statue located on Piazza San Francesco d'Assisi, located between the church of San Francesco and the Palazzo Gravina-Cruyllas (Museo Belliniano) in the city of Catania, Sicily, Italy.

== History and description ==
The monument was commissioned by the comune of Catania to honor its formal archbishop and cardinal, Giuseppe Benedetto Dusmet (1818 - 1894), who was admired for his devotion to charity for the poor. The monument was designed in 1935 by Raffaele Leone and Silvestre Cuffaro, and sculpted by Mimì Maria Lazzaro. Lazzaro is also responsible for some of the sculptures found in Piazza dell'Università. The statue of the cardinal is mildly elongated and larger than life; he is dressed in his preferred cloak of a Benedictine monk. The militant sobriety of the monument and its large tall pedestal, or base, with the coat of arms of the cardinal seem to counter the emphasis on charity. The base has four reliefs depicts events of charity, including one showing the cardinal with Mount Etna in background. The inscription has an anti-Marie Antoinette quote: Sin quando avremo un panettello noi lo divideremo col povero (As long as we have a cake we will share it with the poor). Further praises are in a convex area of the base in the rear.
