= San Benedetto, Catania =

Roman Catholic Church in Italy

Coordinates: 37°30′13.3″N 15°5′4.1″E

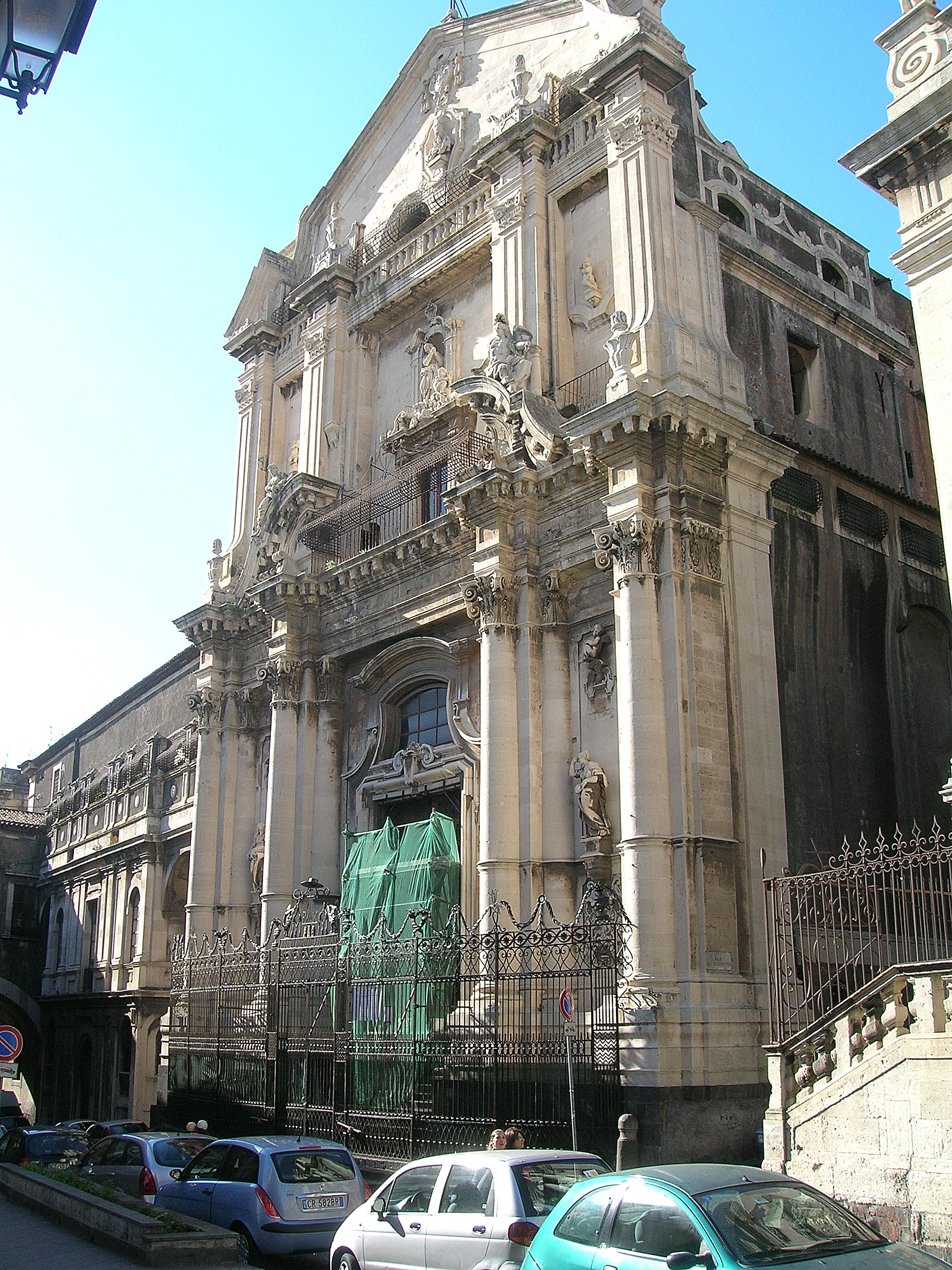
Facade of San Benedetto, at extreme left of the photo is a glimpse of the start of the Arch of San Benedetto

San Benedetto is a late-Baroque architecture, Roman Catholic church and former Benedictine monastery in the city Catania, Sicily, southern Italy. The church facade faces Via Crociferi, parallels across via San Benedetto the former-Jesuit church of San Francesco Borgia, and both are about a block south along Crociferi from the church and convent of San Giuliano. Entrance to church and monastery appear to be through Piazza Asmundo #9 near the apse of the church.

== History and description ==
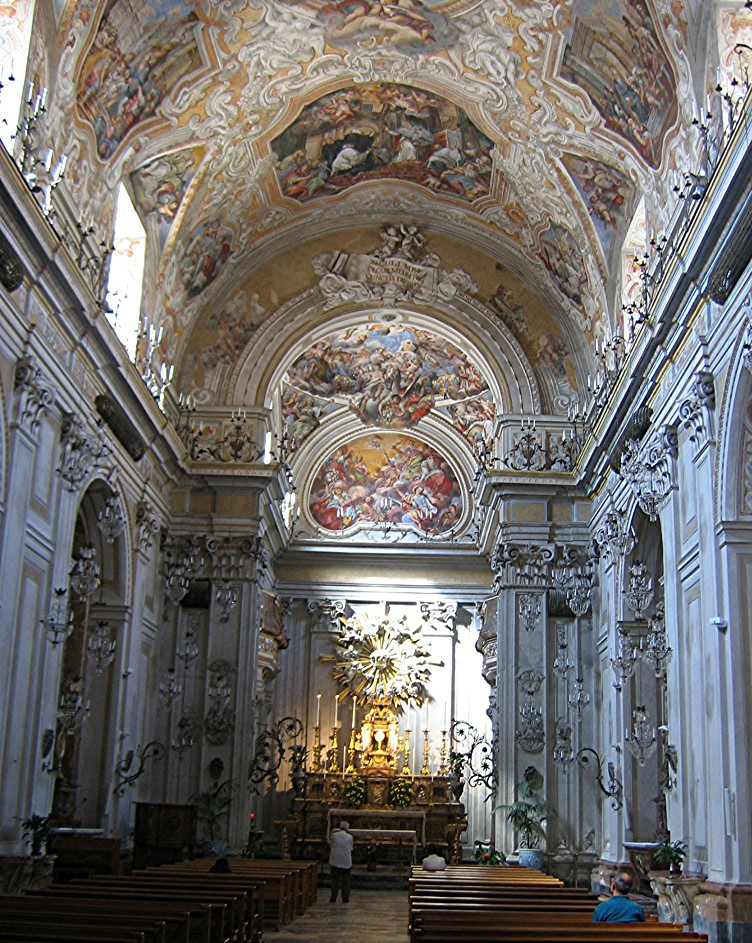
View of nave towards main altar and apse

Dedicated to St. Benedict of Nursia, a first church at the site was completed in April 1334, endowed by the noblewoman Alemanna Lumella. However, like most buildings in town, it was razed by the 1693 Sicily earthquake; only 5 nuns survived the disaster. The church was rebuilt by 1714, but construction of the monastery continued until 1763. Giovanni Battista Vaccarini was one of the main architects. The church is part of a monastic complex including also the Badia Maggiore and the Badia Minore, connected by a covered arch (Arco delle Monache Benedettinne) over the road, allowing for the cloistered nuns to cross.

The church was also damaged by bombing in World War II and later restored by the architect Armand Dillon.

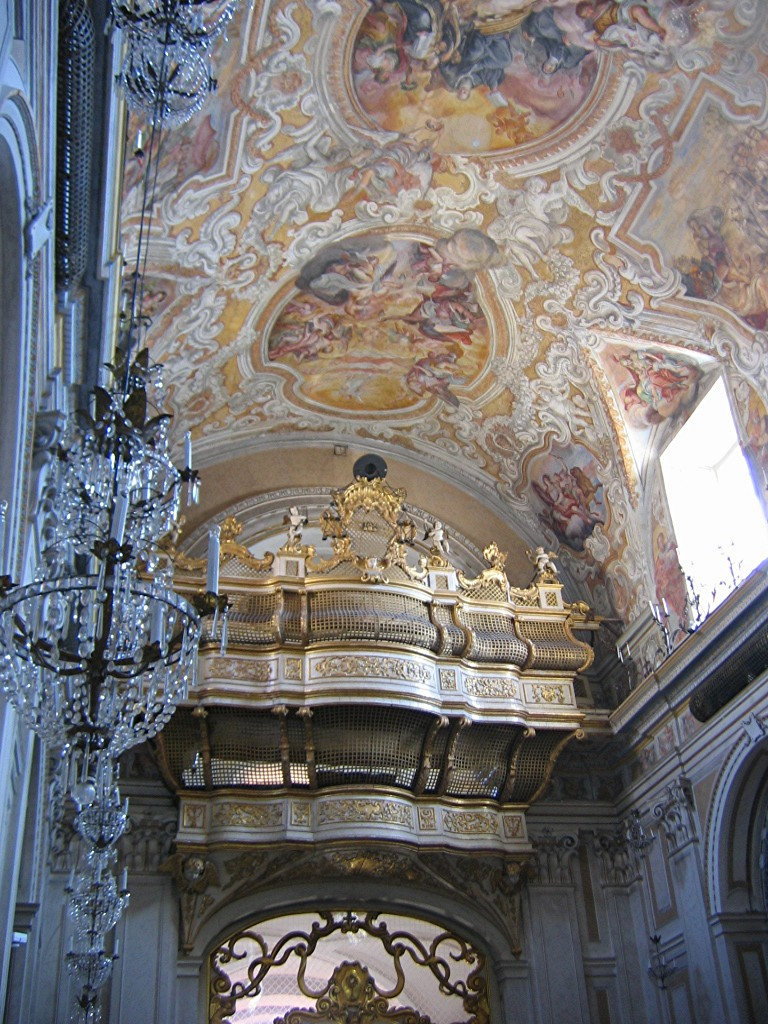
West end of nave, with the nun's choir above entrance vestibule.

The front of the church is preceded by an elaborate iron fence, across the street a wide pedestrian alley winds downhill through steps. The tall facade is flanked by pilasters, and decorated with various statues. The broken pediment of the tympanum has two reclining allegorical female statues representing Fortitude and Temperance. In the center high above the portal is a statue of the Virgin Mary. The entrance door, in wood, has panels with scenes from the life of St Benedict.

Its most famous feature is the Angel's Staircase (Italian: Scalinata dell'Angelo), a marble entrance stair decorated with statues of angels and surrounded by a wrought iron railings.

The interior, with a single nave, is richly decorated with stucco and frescoes, including works by Matteo Desiderato. The vault and semi-dome were frescoed in 1726-1729 by Giovanni Tuccari with depictions of the Life of Saint Benedict and six Allegories surrounding the Triumph of Saint Benedict. The Saint is represented in his traditional iconography, in a festive and cheerful scenario. The high altar is in polychrome marble with hardstone intarsia and bronze panels. The altarpieces inside the church depict an Immaculate Conception by Sebastiano Lo Monaco and a St Benedict by M. Rapisardi (1822–1886). It once contained an altarpiece depicting St Benedict by the Flemish artist Guglielmo Borremans and a Guardian Angel by Matteo Desiderati.

The church is open on Tuesday, Friday and Saturday from 10:00 am to 5:00 pm (last entrance).

== Sources ==
- Rasà Napoli, Giuseppe (1984). Guida alle Chiese di Catania. Catania: Tringale Editore.
