= Antonino Paternò Castello, 8th Marquess of San Giuliano =

Italian diplomat

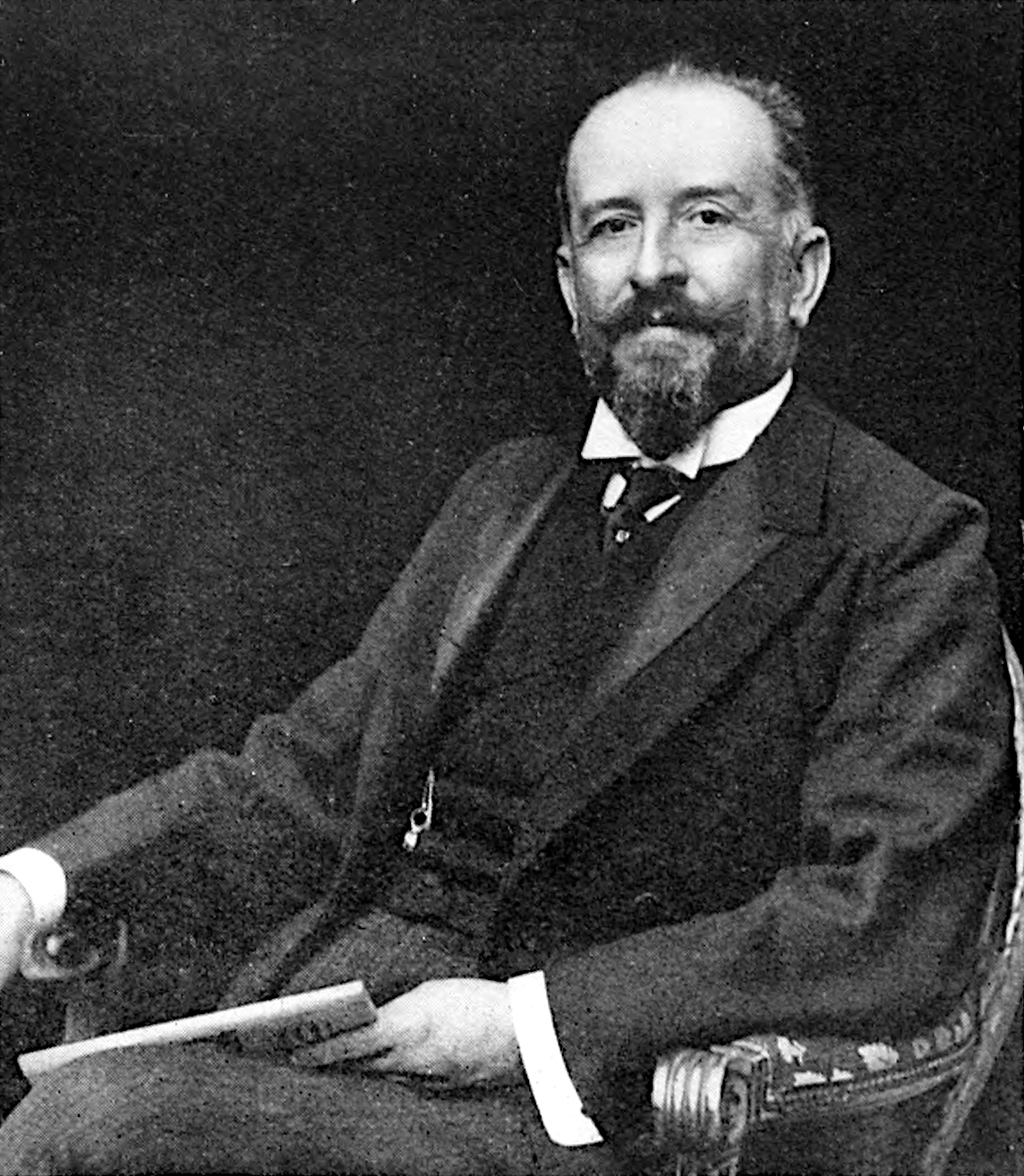

Minister of Foreign Affairs
- In office 24 December 1905 – 8 February 1906
- Prime Minister: Alessandro Fortis
- Preceded by: Alessandro Fortis
- Succeeded by: Francesco Guicciardini
- In office 31 March 1910 – 16 October 1914
- Prime Minister: Luigi Luzzatti; Giovanni Giolitti; Antonio Salandra
- Preceded by: Francesco Guicciardini
- Succeeded by: Sidney Sonnino

Personal details
- Born: Antonino Paternò Castello; 9 December 1852 Catania, Sicily
- Died: 16 October 1914 (aged 61) Rome, Italy
- Party: Historical Right

Antonino Paternò Castello, 8th Marquess of San Giuliano (9 December 1852 – 16 October 1914), was an Italian diplomat and Minister of Foreign Affairs and member of the House of Paternò, a major Sicilian noble family.

== Early life and political career ==
Antonino Paternò Castello was born in Catania, Sicily into the House of Paternò, a major feudal and princely family descended from House of Barcellona. In his younger years he studied economics and sociology, and published articles on agriculture, industry, population, labour legislation, and emigration in various journals.

In 1882 he was elected to parliament and aligned himself with Sidney Sonnino, representing the conservatives who identified with the old Historical Right. In the early years of the 20th century, he focused on foreign policy in the years of the polarization of European powers into the Triple Alliance and Triple Entente blocs. He was convinced that Italy's national interest could best advanced by balancing itself between the two competing alliances.

== Foreign policy ==
He conducted a policy of friendship toward France, while remaining faithful to Italy's commitments to Austria-Hungary and the German Empire. He served as foreign minister (1905–1906), ambassador to London (1906–1909), ambassador to Paris (1909–1910), and foreign minister (1910–1914). An advocate of colonial expansion, his diplomacy cleared the way for the occupation of Libya during the Italo-Turkish War (1911–1912). He resisted the expansion of Austria-Hungary in the Balkans, supported Italian economic penetration of Montenegro, and the independence of Albania.

== World War I ==
When World War I broke out, he implemented a policy of neutrality but did not rule out intervention, according to Prime Minister Antonio Salandra's policy of "sacred egoism" (sacro egoismo). Negotiating with both the Triple Entente and Triple Alliance powers, he insisted on gaining maximum territorial concessions for participation in the war to fulfill Italy's irredentist claims.

He became seriously ill in October 1914 and retired. His successor, Sidney Sonnino, followed the negotiating strategy set by San Giuliano, leading to the secret Treaty of London or London Pact (Italian: Patto di Londra) with the Triple Entente. According to the pact, Italy was to leave the Triple Alliance and join the Triple Entente. Italy was to declare war against Germany and Austria-Hungary within a month in return for territorial concessions at the end of the war.

== Honours ==
  (Kingdom of Italy)
  - 1 December 1907: Grand Cross of the Order of Saints Maurice and Lazarus
  - 1910: Grand Cross of the Order of the Crown of Italy
  - 21 October 1912: Knight of the Supreme Order of the Most Holy Annunciation
- (Belgium) 1910: Grand Cordon of the Order of Leopold
- (Monaco) 19 May 1910: Grand Cross of the Order of Saint-Charles
- (Restoration (Spain)) 16 March 1911: Grand Cross of the Order of Charles III
- (Empire of Japan) 8 September 1913: Grand Cordon of the Order of the Paulownia Flowers

== See also ==
- Italian entry into World War I
