= Riccardo Paternò di Montecupo =

Grand Chancellor of Malta (born 1945)

- His Excellency Prince and Count
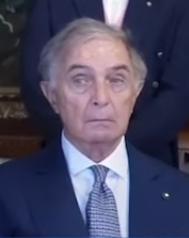

Grand Chancellor of the Sovereign Military Order of Malta
- Incumbent
- Assumed office 3 September 2022
- Monarch: John T. Dunlap
- Preceded by: Albrecht von Boeselager
- Born: 5 October 1945 (age 81); Naples, Campania, Italy
- Spouse: Princess Donna Sveva Paternò (née Gilardini)
- House: House of Paternò
- Father: Balì Frà Renato Paternò di Montecupo, Grand Prior of Naples and Sicily
- Mother: Countess Donna Laura Paternò (née Curato)
- Religion: Roman Catholic

Don Riccardo Paternò, Count of Montecupo, Prince of Cerenzia, of the Dukes of San Nicola and Pozzomauro (born 5 October 1945) is an Italian economist and academic serving as the grand chancellor of the Sovereign Military Order of Malta since September 2022. He is a member of the House of Paternò, a major Sicilian noble family.

== Early life and economic career ==
Paternò di Montecupo was born on 5 October 1945 in Naples, Italy. He attended the University of Naples Federico II and graduated with a law degree. He later became an economist and professor. He was the chair of International Economics for the University of Naples for 35 years, having begun teaching there in 1980. He also was a visiting professor at the London School of Economics in 1981 and taught International Economics at several other Italian universities.

Between 1983 and 1994 Paternò di Montecupo served as an economic advisor to several ministries of the Italian Government, including the Minister of Industry and Minister of Defence, in addition to the Prime Minister's Office. He was also a Member of the Technical Scientific Committee for Economic Planning of the Ministry of Budget and Economic Planning (1989-1996).

During his career he advised a number of companies, including Confindustria (1986-1998), Salomon Brothers (1992-1998), Bayer (1997-1999), and Ernst & Young (1999 to today), among others. He is still the active President of the Ernst & Young Foundation.

A member of the Italian Society of Economists, he was also a contributor to the Naples daily newspaper Il Mattino.

== Sovereign Military Order of Malta ==
Paternò di Montecupo is active in charitable organizations, having joined UNITALSI in 1962, serving as president of the Ernst & Young Foundation, "whose aim is to give opportunities to young people in disadvantaged situations," and founding the Renato and Laura Paternò Foundation, another charitable group which he chairs.

Paternò di Montecupo became a member of the Sovereign Military Order of Malta (SMOM) in 1979. The SMOM, a Catholic order focused on providing humanitarian aid, is considered a sovereign entity although it possesses no territory, having diplomatic relations with 115 countries as of 2025. Paternò di Montecupo served as the Order's Deputy Observer for its mission to the Food and Agriculture Organization (FAO) and as the head of the Association of Italian Knights of the Sovereign Military Order of Malta from June 2016 to April 2023, thus also being the head of the SMOM Military Corps.

On 3 September 2022, Paternò di Montecupo was appointed by Pope Francis to be the Grand Chancellor of the SMOM, a position making him the equivalent of a prime minister. He also became a member of the Sovereign Council of the Order of Malta and the Minister of Foreign Affairs as well as the Minister of Internal Affairs. In January 2023, he was re-confirmed to the post of Grand Chancellor for a six-year term expiring in 2029.

In September 2023, Paternò di Montecupo gave a speech at the United Nations Security Council on the subject of the war in Ukraine, discussing the humanitarian efforts put out by the SMOM as well as the costs of the war, noting that "there is no easy solution to this conflict, but peace remains the only way out of this tragic situation. We are aware that the process could be long, difficult and painful, but there is no alternative if we want to stop as soon as possible the enormous human suffering and the negative economic and social repercussions of the war at a global level," as well as that the monetary cost of the war was so great that it could have funded UNICEF for over 30 years. He was the first Grand Chancellor of the SMOM ever to speak at the UN Security Council.

Paternò di Montecupo spoke at the 60th Munich Security Conference in February 2024 and later gave another address to the UN Security Council in September 2024, on the topic of "Leadership for Peace." In October 2024, he was a co-signer of an agreement to officially establish relations between the SMOM and the United Kingdom.

== Honours and awards ==
Italy:

- Knight Grand Cross of the Order of the Star of Italy (2023)
- Knight Grand Cross of the Order of the Merit of the Italian Republic (2025)

House of Savoy: Grand Cross of the Order of Saints Maurice and Lazarus (2023)
