= San Giuliano, Catania =

Church and attached convent in Catania, Italy

Coordinates: 37.50435°N 15.08490°E

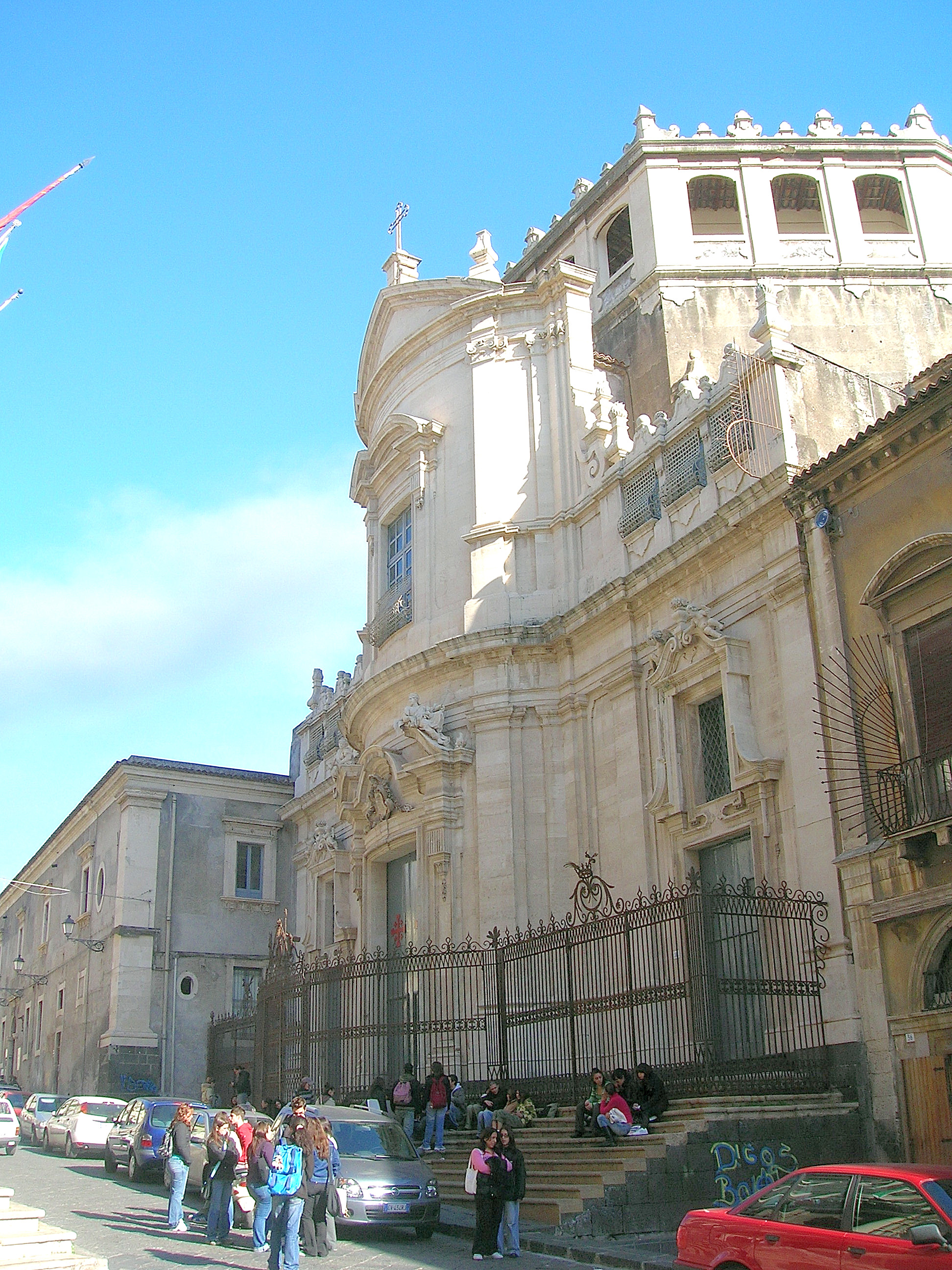
Facade of church on Via Crocifero

San Giuliano is a Roman Catholic church and attached convent located on Via Crocifero #36 of Catania, Sicily, southern Italy. It stands across from the Collegio dei Gesuiti (Jesuit college), whose church of San Francesco Borgia also faces Crociferi. Two blocks north on Crociferi is the baroque church of San Camillo de Lellis.

== History and description ==
The church was erected at the site of a prior church that had been razed by the 1693 earthquake. It is dedicated the St Julian the Hospitaller. The present late-Baroque church was built between 1739 and 1751 using designs by Giuseppe Palazzotto and Vincenzo Caffarelli. The church has an elaborate convex facade. The upper story has windows shielded by a dense iron grate, these windows were used by the cloistered Benedictine nuns of the attached monastery to watch the splendid procession of the day of Sant'Agata as it passed by. The portal has an added shield of a tall metal fence. The facade pediment is broken and each pediment holds a reclining maiden, sculpted by Gaspare Ciriaci. The entrance door have a cross of the Order of the Holy Sepulchre, who restored the church after 1939.

The interior nave is an elongated asymmetric octagon with a main altar and four shallow circumferential minor altars, designed by Antonino Battaglia, the son of Francesco. The main altar in polychrome was designed by Giovanni Battista Vaccarini, and sculpted by Giovanni Battista Marino. the statuettes flanking the throne and painted cross, depict allegories of Faith and Charity. The minor altarpieces depict:

- The Madonna of the Graces with St Joseph and St Benedict by Olivio Sozzi.
- St Anthony Abbot in Ecstasy by Pietro Abbadessa.
- Scenes of the Life of St Julian and his Martyrdom
- Crucifixion scene with Mary of the Sorrows, Mary Magdalen, and St John the Evangelist

The cupola was frescoed by Giuseppe Rapisardi in 1842, depicting God the Father and St Peter consign the Gospels to St Berillo.
