= San Francesco Borgia, Catania =

Church in Catania, Italy

Coordinates: 37.50398334003049°N 15.084769940260623°E

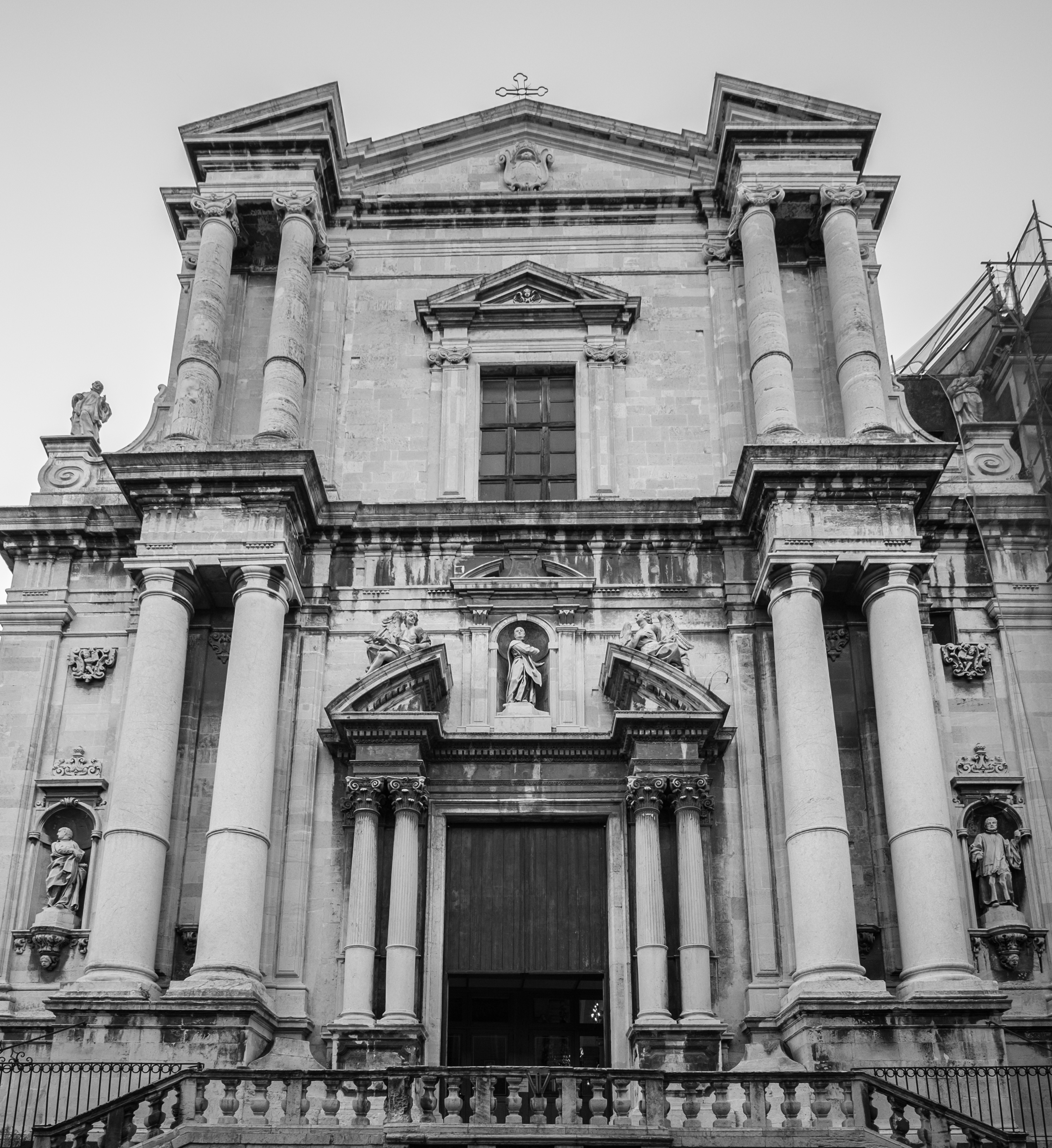
San Francesco Borgia facade

San Francesco Borgia is a Roman Catholic church located on Via Crociferi #7, adjacent to the former Collegio Gesuita, and parallel to San Benedetto, and about a block south on Crociferi of the church and convent of San Giuliano, in the city of Catania, region of Sicily, southern Italy. The church is mainly used for exhibits, but still holds much of the original Jesuit artwork.

== History and description ==
When the Jesuits arrived in the mid-16th century to Catania, they were assigned the ancient church of the Ascencione located at this site. Corresponding to their growing influence, they commissioned a new church dedicated to Saint Ignatius Loyola, a few blocks from here, on the present via Etna, completed by 1578 and designed by Tommaso Blandino. When that building was razed by the 1693 Sicily earthquake, they chose the site of the Ascencione church to build a new baroque church was designed by the fellow Jesuit Angelo Italia, begun in 1698, and completed by 1736.

In 1767, the Jesuit order was expelled from the Kingdom of Naples; the college and church became government property, and were used for diverse schools and charitable organizations. In 1867, the Collegio building was used to house the Grande Ospizio di Beneficenza, which cared for abandoned infants (esposti) once they reached school age. It had room for 600 illegitimate abandoned children, boys only, aged 7 through 18, who were trained as typesetters, shoemakers, tailors, carriage makers, ironworkers, and furniture makers. The foundling home had a gym and musical training.

Since 1995, the college has been used by the region's cultural offices, and houses a regional library. The church is presently deconsecrated and used for cultural activities by the Soprintendenza Regionale ai Beni Culturali.

The facade has a more classical front, lacking curved lines, but has flanking columns to the portal, which above has a broken pediment. The facade has five statues of Jesuit saints. The center one over the portal is the titular saint, while the flanking lower two are Ignatius Loyola and Francis Xavier; the upper statues depict Aloysius Gonzaga and Stanislaus Kostka.

The interior layout is of a Latin cross with a central nave and two aisles with chapels. Most of the work was completed by 1740. The first altar on the right has an altarpiece depicting the Vision of the Madonna and Child to San Giovanni Francesco Regis while in agony by Luciano Foti (1694-1779). The second altar on the right depicts the Saints Stanislaus Kostka and Aloysius Gonzaga by Giovanni Tuccari (1667- 1743). The main altar is rich in polychrome marble and sculptural decorations by Giovanni Battista Marino. Part of it was vandalized in the 1980s. The main altarpiece is a copy (1567) of the Madonna della Neve found in Santa Maria Maggiore, Rome. The work was donated by Francesco Borgia himself. The transept has two chapels decorated with polychrome marble and large marple sculptural reliefs depicting on the right Francis Xavier baptizing the King of India by Marino and on the left, the Apotheosis of St Ignatius with the four corners of the world by Ignazio Francesco Marabitti.The reliefs are each flanked by four green marble Solomonic columns.

The base of the dome has statues of the four evangelists also by Marino, with stucco decoration by Giuseppe Serpotta. The frescoes depict the Triumph of St Ignatius and the Jesuits over heresy with a glory of Saints and Martyrs painted by Olivio Sozzi. The apse has painted curtains in a trompe-l'œil effect.

In the altars of the left are two altarpieces: St Agatha visited in jail by St Peter by Daniele Monteleone; and a Glory of St Joseph by Giuseppe Guarnaccia.

The adjacent former Collegio Gesuiti is notable for a Vaccarini courtyard with a white and blackstone decoration, similar to that seen in the Palazzo Cutelli in town.
