= Santa Maria della Purità, Catania =

Former Roman Catholic church

Coordinates: 37.50649°N 15.08314°E

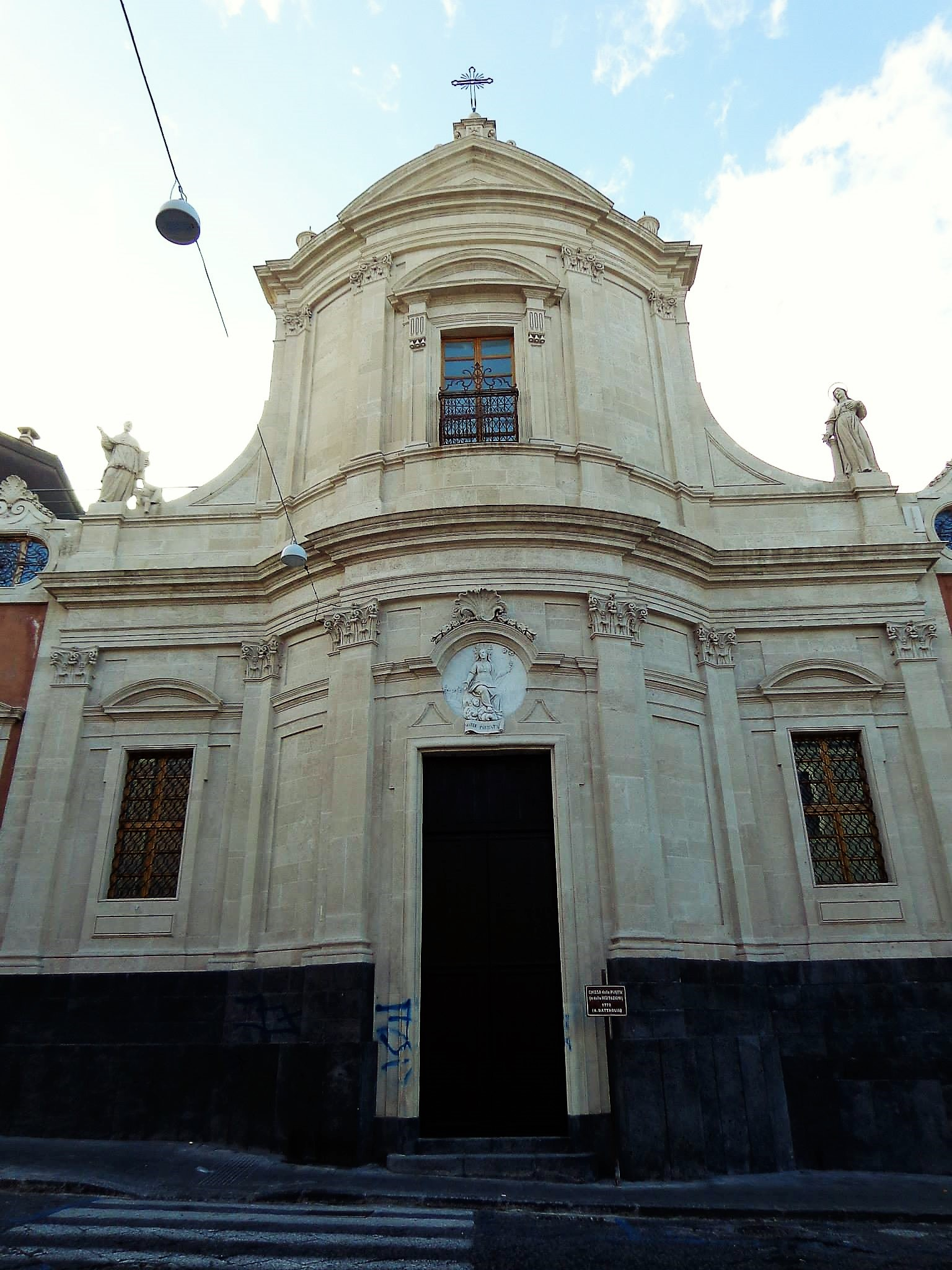
Facade of church

The deconsecrated Chiesa della Purità is a former Roman Catholic church, with a large adjacent conservatory or orphanage; both structures are located on via Santa Maddalena #39 in Catania, region of Sicily, southern Italy. It is located on the hill of Montervergine, where via Santa Maddalena encounters via Giuseppe Auletta, a block south of the church of Sant'Agata la Vetere. The former conservatory extends the full block west along Via Plebiscito. The former church now functions as the auditorium for the faculty of jurisprudence of the University of Catania. The former conservatory is encompassed by public schools: including Istituto Comprensivo.

== History and description ==
The institution at this site was founded in 1775, by a Benedictine prior, with support of the Senate and private donations. Referred to in some sources as a conservatorio (orphanage), in others as a reclusorio (holding facility), the aim was to house and train orphan young girls. At the age of maturity, they could choose either to join a religious order under the rules of St Francis de Sales or marry or return to the custody of some family member. In 1787, the institute was endowed by the city treasurer don Giovanni Francesco Lullo, who required the institution to allow for enrollment 12 daughters of lawyers from Catania. By 1872, the conservatory had become the college of female education Pius IX and later named after Queen Elena.

The church was built from 1775 to 1789 using designs from Antonino Battaglia, the son of Francesco Battaglia. The convex facade recalls the baroque churches designed by Francesco, but it maintains a more classical sobriety of neoclassicism with corinthian pilasters, and less extraneous decoration. Above the portal is a Virgin under a clam-shell with a banner extolling purity.
