= Stratigotus =

Judicial official in medieval Italy

A stratigotus was a judicial official in mediaeval southern Italy. The position is documented from Norman times until at least 1239, from only a small number of cities, including Amalfi, Messina, Naples, Salerno and Santa Caterina, Calabria. The word is of onomastic derivation.

== See also ==
- Strategos
