= Ignazio Paternò Castello =

Italian polymath (1722–1786)

Ignazio II Paternò Castello
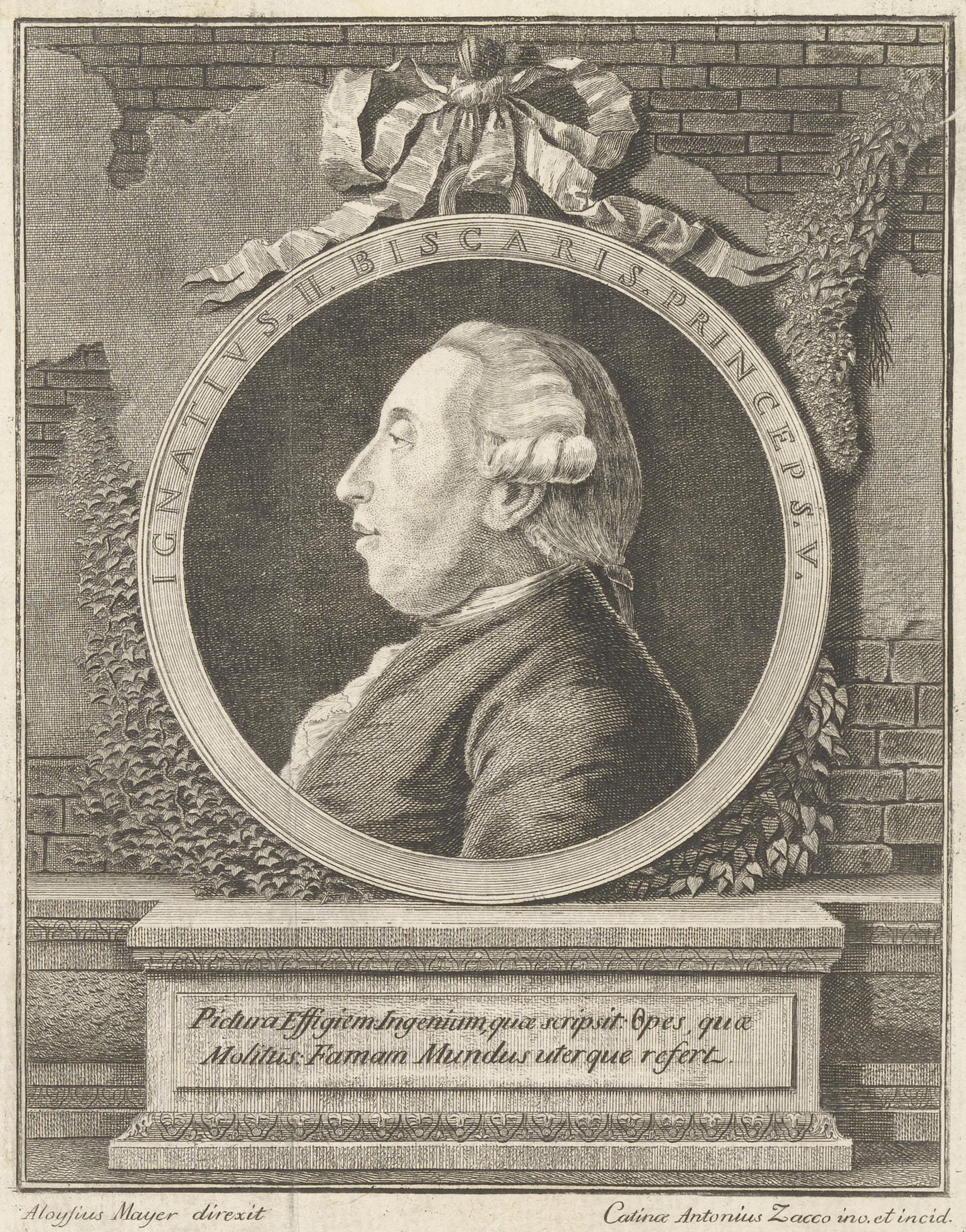
- Full name: Ignazio II Paternò Castello
- Born: 24 May 1719; Catania, Kingdom of Sicily
- Died: 1 September 1786 (aged 67); Catania, Kingdom of Sicily
- Noble family: House of Paternò
- Spouse: Donna Anna Maria Morso di Poggioreale
- Father: Don Vincenzo II Paternò Castello, IV Prince of Biscari
- Mother: Donna Anna Scammacca della Bruca

Ignazio Paternò Castello, Prince of Biscari (1722 – 1 September 1786) was an Italian polymath, antiquarian, patron of the arts, and member of the House of Paternò, a major Sicilian noble family. He lived most of his life in his native Catania in Sicily.

== Biography ==
Born to a wealthy noble family, he studied under the Theatines in Palermo.

His fondness for he classical heritage and his endowment as a prince, allowed him to foster many excavations and restorations of ancient monuments in Sicily, and collected a large collection of Greco-Roman artifacts, including vases, urns, medals and coins. He helped further excavate part of the Roman theater and amphitheater at Catania.

He was prolific at communicating his findings and writing to other scholars in the continent. He was granted honorary membership in the Royal Society of London, the Academy of Bordeaux, the Accademia della Crusca and of the Georgofili of Florence, of the Arcadi of Rome, as well as academies in Naples, Palermo, and in his home of Catania. He employed the architect Francesco Battaglia to refurbish his Palazzo Biscari in Catania. This palace once held many of his collections, but they are now housed in the Museo Civico Castello Ursino. He patronized the construction of a bridge in Aragona.

== Works ==
- Viaggio per tutte le antichità di Sicilia (1781)
- Descrizione del terribile tremuoto del 5 febbraio 1783
- Ragionamento sopra gli antichi ornamenti e trastulli de' bambini
- Memoria al senato di Catania, relativamente al molo da costruirsi nella marina di quella citta (1771)
- Discorso accademico sopra un'antica Iscrizione trovata nel teatro di Catania
