= Giovanni Tuccari =

Italian painter

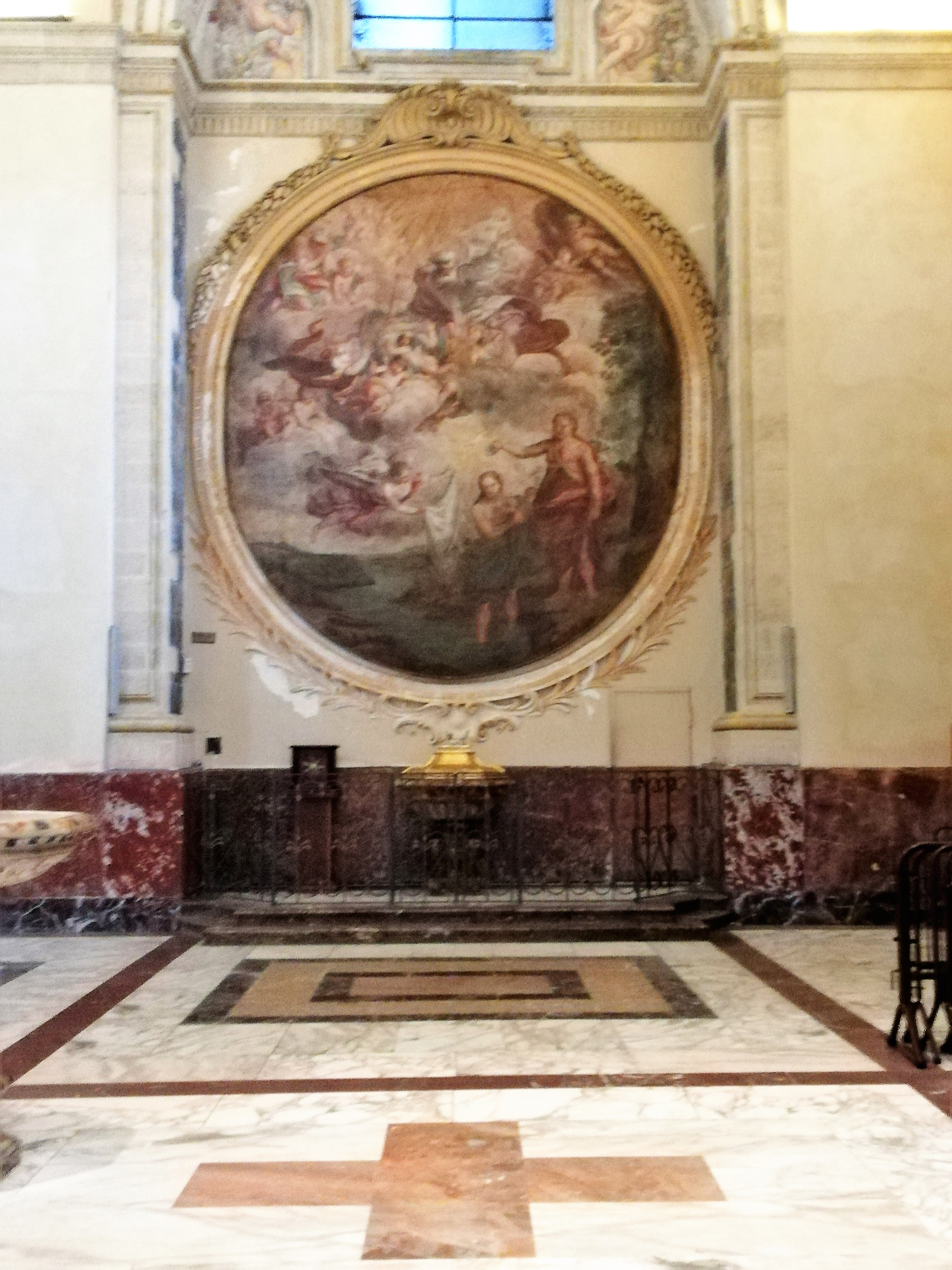
Baptism of Christ in Cattedrale di Sant'Agata in Catania

Giovanni Tuccari (1667–1743) was an Italian painter during the Baroque period, active in Sicily.

Tuccari was born in Messina. He was the son and pupil of Antonio Tuccari, an obscure painter. He excelled as a battle painter. He died of the plague. He was responsible for the frescos in the church of San Benedetto of Catania. Other examples of his work include four octagonal paintings in the sanctuary of the Church of Sant'Antonio, at Castiglione di Sicilia, and the Pinacoteca Zelantea in Acireale.
