= Andrew Jamieson (artist) =

British heraldic artist and illustrator

- Born: Bermondsey, South London
- Education: Salisbury College of Art, Reigate School of Art

Andrew Jamieson is a British heraldic artist and illustrator, known for his work at the College of Arms and as the painter official invitations to the coronation of King Charles III.

== Early life ==
Jamieson was born Bermondsey, South London, where he lived until he turned fourteen, when he moved to a cousin estate near Dagenham, Essex.

== Coronation of King Charles III ==
In 2023, Andrew Jamieson was commissioned personally by King Charles III to design the invitations for his coronation, held on the 6th of May. The invitation included designs important to the King and Queen, including wildflowers, birds and insects, as well as other national and heraldic symbols. (Note: Wildflowers, birds and insects, as well as national and heraldic emblems.)
