= Piazza Mazzini, Catania =

Square in Catania, Italy

Coordinates: 37.5018°N 15.0849°E

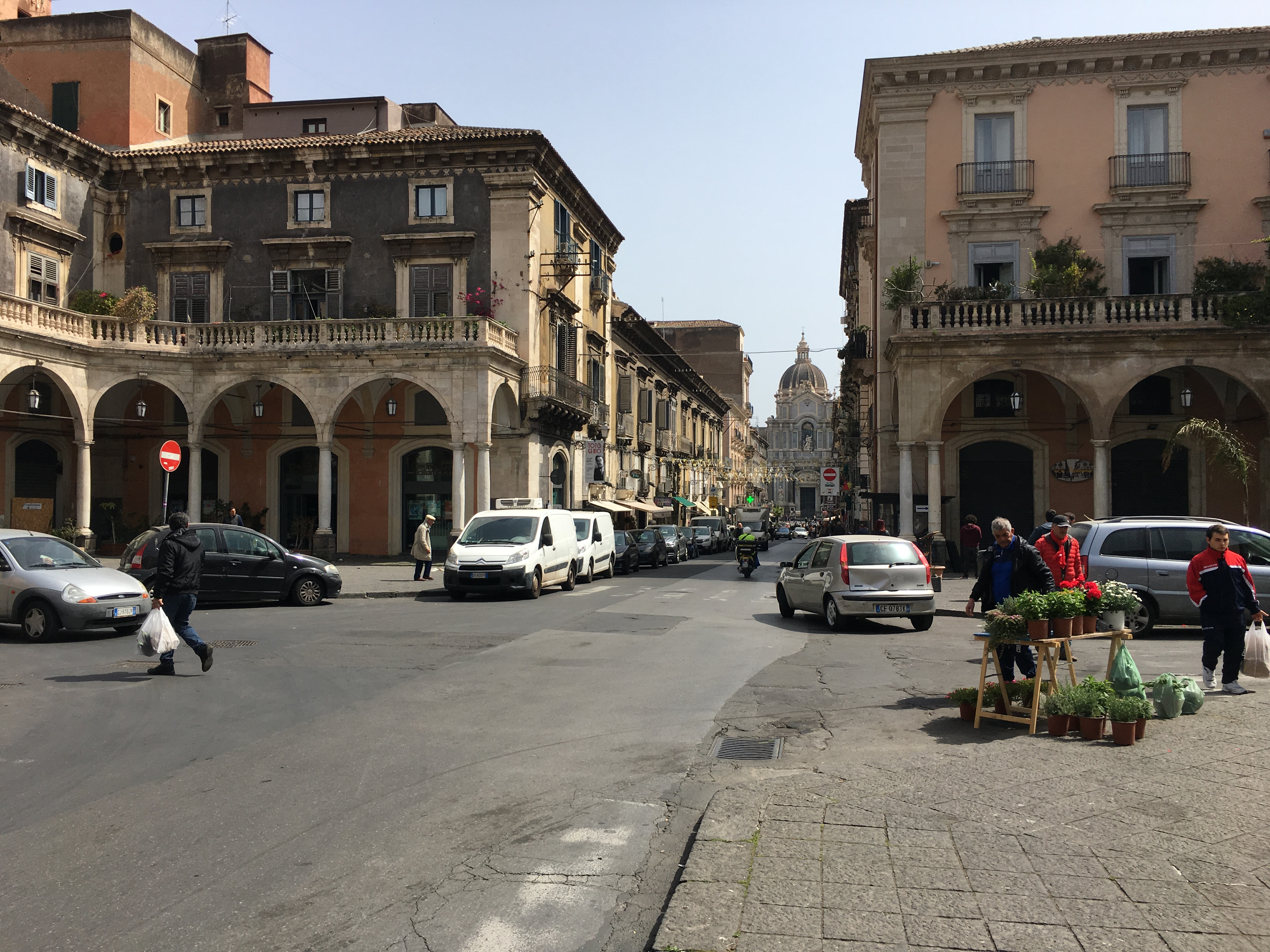
East flank of Piazza Mazzini, he palaces of Scammacca and Asmundo frame a view down via Garibaldi to the Catania Cathedral.

Piazza Giuseppe Mazzini is a city square in the historic center of Catania, region of Sicily, Italy; it is remarkable for being ringed by 32 columns, putatively derived from an Ancient Roman basilica, arrayed in four nearly symmetrical arcades.

== History and description ==
Prior to the devastating 1693 earthquake, this was known as ‘’Piano di San Filippo’’. During the urban reconstruction that followed the earthquake, it was planned to mark this space as a marketplace, and surround the space with four symmetric arcades utilizing ancient doric columns that had been found at the site of the church of Sant’Agostino. The arcades consist of double columns at the ends with five internal arches created by four internal single column posts. The columns stand on a short black stone plinth and are surmounted by balconies with marble balustrades. The arcades are interrupted by two intersecting cross streets: via Giuseppe Garibaldi and via della Lettera. Behind the arcades are four distinct palaces: Palazzo Scammacca della Bruca to the north-east, Palazzo Asmundo di Gisira to the south-east, Palazzo Peratoner to the south-west, and Palazzo Gagliani to the north-west. The plan was to have the palaces all retain the same harmonious façade, but since the 18th-century, three of the palaces added balcony windows to the third or attic floor. The marketplaces in Catania are present elsewhere, and the ground floor arcades mainly house stores and business establishments.

An 1864 guidebook calls this the Piazza San Fillipo, and recalls the piazza, during the era of Spanish rule, could be converted into a bullfighting rink.
