= Duke of Carcaci =

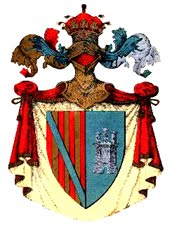
- Or, four pales gules overall a bendlet azure
- Creation date: 27 March 1725
- Created by: Charles VI, Holy Roman Emperor, King of Sicily
- Peerage: Peerage of Sicily
- First holder: Don Vincenzo Paternò Castello, 1st Duke of Carcaci
- Present holder: Don Alessandro (Alexander) Paternò Castello, 13th Duke
- Heir apparent: Don Tancredi Paternò Castello, Barone of Placa Bajana
- Subsidiary titles: Baron of Placa Bajana
- Former seat: Castello di Carcaci, Sicily

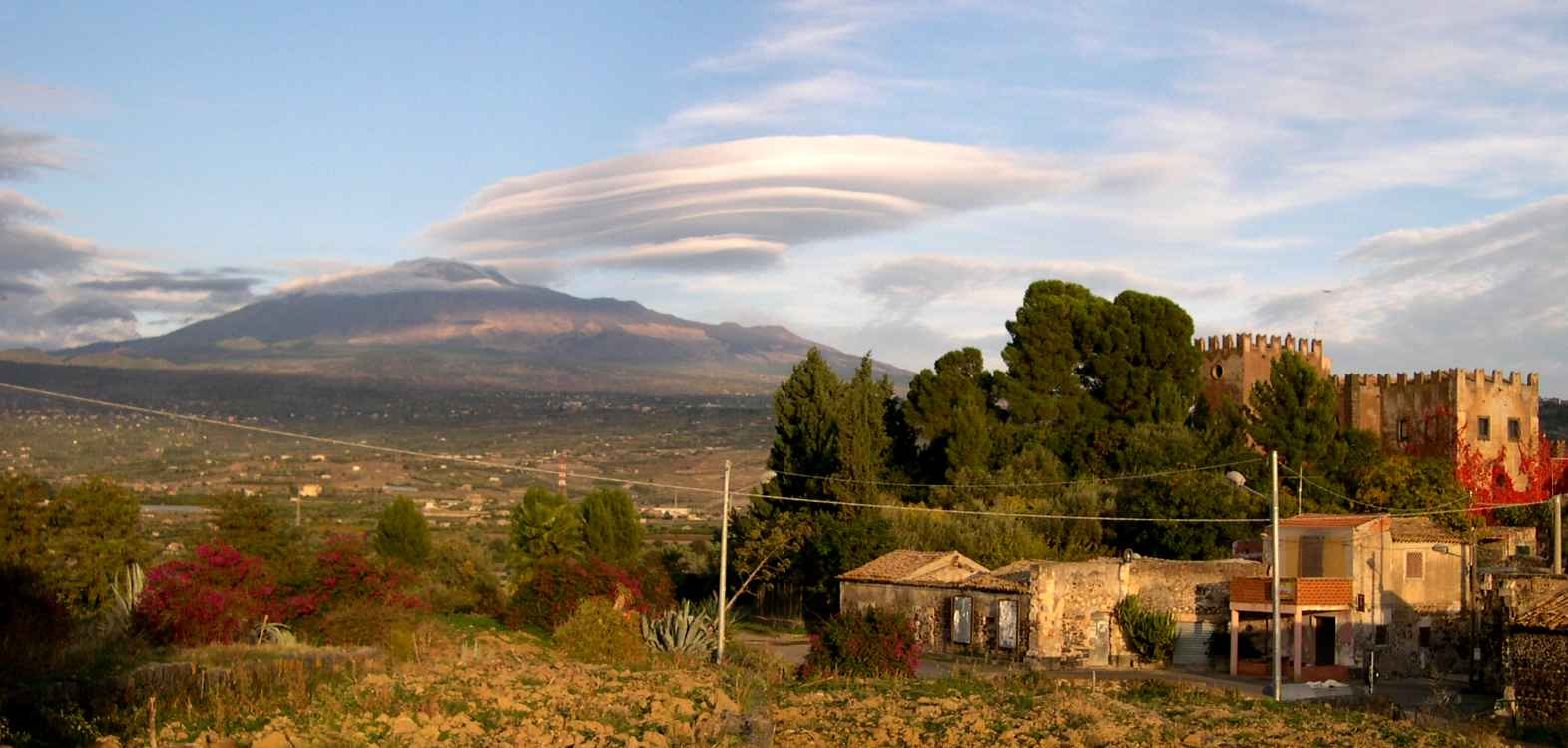
Carcaci Castle (Castello di Carcaci), view eastwards towards Mount Etna, Sicily

Duke of Carcaci (Italian: Duca di Carcaci) (pron: "Car-catch-ee") is a title in the Kingdom of Sicily, held by the head of one branch of the House of Paternò, a major Sicilian noble family.

The estate of Carcaci, from which the dukedom and the branch is named, is situated in Sicily, 20 miles north-west of Catania (where the ducal palazzo still stands), at the junction of the River Simeto and River Salso. It is thus situated about 15 miles west of the crater of Mount Etna. The first Duke of Carcaci was Don Vincenzo Paternò Castello (1681–1767) who in 1725 was created in Vienna a duke in the Kingdom of Sicily by Charles VI, Holy Roman Emperor and King of Sicily.

Carcaci had become the seat of a feudal barony shortly after the Norman Conquest of Sicily in 1061, when the first castle was built on the site. The barony and estate was acquired by this branch of the House of Paternò in 1719.

== Dukes of Carcaci (1725) ==
- Don Vincenzo Paternò Castello, 1st Duke of Carcaci (1681–1767), born in Catania, 2nd son of Don Giacinto Paternò Castello, Baron of Bicocca and Donna Agata Paternò, daughter of Vincenzo 8th Barone di Raddusa. He succeeded in 1695 as 3rd Baron of Bicocca. Acquired the estate of Carcaci in 1719 and invested as 1st Duke of Carcaci in Vienna on 27 March 1725. Leader of the Parliament of the Kingdom of Sicily in 1732, Vicar General of the Kingdom of Sicily 1743/1746, Ambassador to King Vittorio Amedeo II of Savoy in 1713; Chief Justice of Catania 1704/1705 and 1718/1719, Patrician of Catania 1715/1715 and 1721/1722. He married in 1697 in Catania Donna Anna Maria Paternò, daughter of Don Francesco Maria Paternò, Baron of Raddusa by his wife Silvia Trigona di Spedalotto.
- Don Mario Concetto, 2nd Duke of Carcaci (1700–1781). Succeeded his father as 2nd Duke and 2nd Baron of Carcaci in 1767. He purchased the Barony of Placa e Bajana for his son. At Catania in 1727 he married Donna Giovanna Maria Rizzari, daughter of Don Francesco, Duke of Tremestieri .
- Don Giuseppe Vincenzo 3rd Duke of Carcaci (1728–1817), born at Catania, 1st Baron of Placa e Bajana (1774), 3rd Baron of Carcaci (1768) and 3rd Duke of Carcaci (invested 1781). Served as Sindaco of Catania in 1765, Capitano Giustiziere of Catania in 1770. Appointed a Knight of the Order of Malta in 1777, and Captain of Arms of War for all the Kingdom of Sicily in 1799. He became a Peer in the Kingdom of Sicily from 1812. Amongst his charitable works he founded in 1796 the Reclusorio dell’Immacolata Concezione, still in operation today, the founding charter of which states: "The well-deserved Catanian Patrician Don Vincenzo Paternò Castello e Rizzardi Duca di Carcaci, moved to pity by the no small number of vagrant and mendicant girls on the public streets, filthy, ragged and inexperienced, founded and maintained with his own capital, lands and buildings, within the City of Catania, a prison for idle girls, dedicated to the Immaculate Conception".
- Don Mario Giuseppe, 4th Duke of Carcaci (1754–1821)
- Don Vincenzo Emanuele Giovanni, 5th Duke of Carcaci (1783–1834)
- Don Mario, 6th Duke of Carcaci (1812–1838)
- Don Francesco Maria Giuseppe, 7th Duke of Carcaci (1786–1854), author of Descrizione di Catania e delle cose notevoli nei dintorni di essa (1841) ("Description of Catania and of notable things in the vicinity");
- Don Gaetano Maria, 8th Duke of Carcaci (1798–1854)
- Don Francesco Maria Domenico, 9th Duke of Carcaci (1850–1912)
- Don Gaetano Maria Domenico (1869–1947), 10th Duke of Carcaci
- Don Francesco (1893–1980), 11th Duke of Carcaci married in 1922 Wanda Diana (1901–1965).
- Don Gaetano (1923-1993), 12th Duke of Carcaci, lived in Naxos near Taormina in Sicily, and in 1960 married Marie Millington-Drake (1924–1973), daughter of Sir Eugen Millington-Drake by his wife Lady Effie Mackay (1895–1984), a daughter of James Mackay, 1st Earl of Inchcape (1852-1932) of Glenapp Castle, Scotland.
- Don Alessandro (b. 1961) (Alexander), 13th Duke of Carcaci, antiques dealer based in London, married (1990) to Lady Charlotte Legge (b.1963), daughter of Gerald Legge, 9th Earl of Dartmouth, by whom he has three children:
  - Don Tancredi Paternò Castello, Baron of Placa e Bajana (born 1997), son and heir apparent
  - Donna Miranda Paternò Castello (born 1993)
  - Donna Chiara Paternò Castello (born 1995).

== Branches of the House of Paternò ==
Robert of Embrun
 │               
 └─── Counts of Butera, Counts of Martana, Barons of Floresta, Barons of Burgio and Imbaccari (XI-XIII cent.)
      │
      ├── Barons of Terza Dogana and Manganelli (branch extinct since 1603)
      │   │
      │   ├── Princes of Sperlinga dei Manganelli, Dukes of Palazzo,
      │   │   Barons of Manganelli, Barons of Mastronotariato (branch extinct)
      │   │   (the title of Prince of Sperlinga dei Manganelli is held since 1940 from the Borghese family, 
      │   │    obtained through the marriage in 1927 of the last Princess to Flavio Borghese XII Prince of Sulmona) 
      │   │
      │   └── Dukes of Roccaromana, Marquesses of Toscano
      │       │
      │       ├── Amico Paternò, Counts Paternò del Grado
      │       │
      │       ├── Marquesses of Sessa, Marquesses Asmundo Paternò, Barons of Villasmundo, etc.
      │       │
      │       └── Dukes of Furnari, Barons of Aci Ficarazzi (extinct) 
      │       │
      │       └── Paternò Abbatelli, Barons of San Cono 
      │   
      ├── Barons of Pantano Salso (branch extinct since XVI cent.)
      │
      └── Barons of Burgio and Imbaccari 
          │ 
          ├──│
          │  ├── Paternò Castello, Princes of Biscari, Barons of Imbaccari, Mirabella
          │  │   │   Aragona, Baldi, Sciortavilla, Cuba e Sparacogna
          │  │   │
          │  │   └── Paternò Castello, Dukes of Carcaci, Barons of Placa e Bajana
          │  │       │
          │  │       └── Paternò Castello, Barons of Bicocca
          │  │
          │  ├── Paternò Castello, Marquesses of Sangiuliano, Marquesses of Capizzi,
          │  │   Barons of Sangiuliano, Barons of Pollicarini, Lords of Mottacamastra, etc. 
          │  │   │
          │  │   └── Paternò Castello (since 1707 Moncada Paternò Castello), Princes of Valsavoja
          │  │
          │  └── Paternò Castello, Barons of Sant'Alessio e Salamone (branch extinct since 1831)
          │    
          ├── Marquesses of Raddusa, Marquesses of Manchi di Bilici, Lords of Marianopoli
          │   │ 
          │   └── Paternò Ventimiglia, Marquesses of Spedalotto, Marquesses of Reggiovanni,
          │       Counts of Prades (Sicily), Barons of Pettineo, Barons of Gallitano, Lords of Alzacuda, etc. 
          │
          ├── Barons of Vallone (branch extinct since XVIII cent.)
          │ 
          └── Princes of Cerenzia, Princes of Presicce, Dukes of Pozzomauro, Dukes of San Nicola, Marquesses of Casanova, Counts of Montecupo.
