= Palazzo Biscari =

Private palace in Sicily, Italy

Coordinates: 37°30′8″N 15°5′25.3″E

The Palazzo Paternò Castello di Biscari is a monumental private palace located in Catania, Italy. The highly decorative interiors are open for guided tours, and used for social and cultural events.

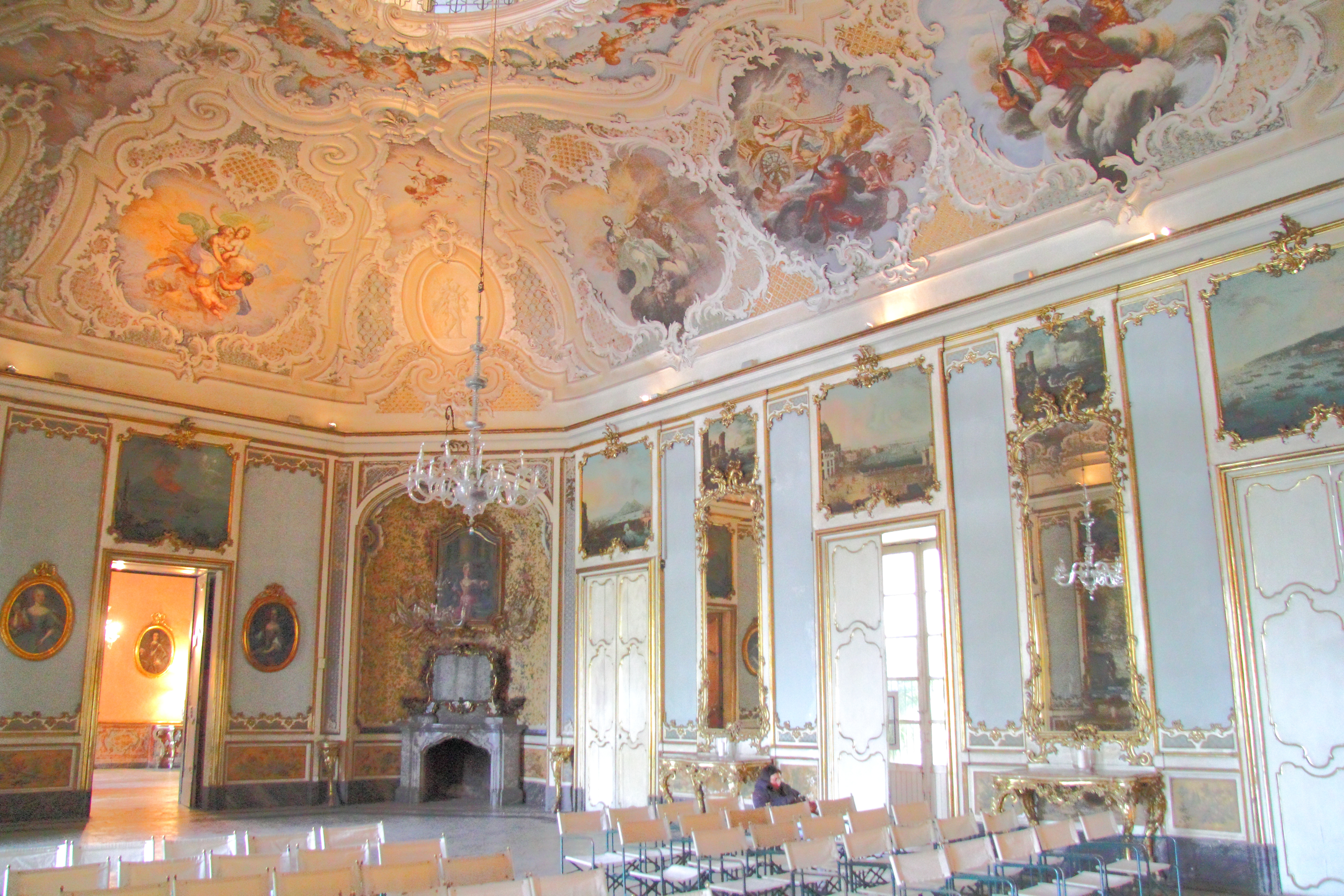
Palazzo Biscari, Internal Halls

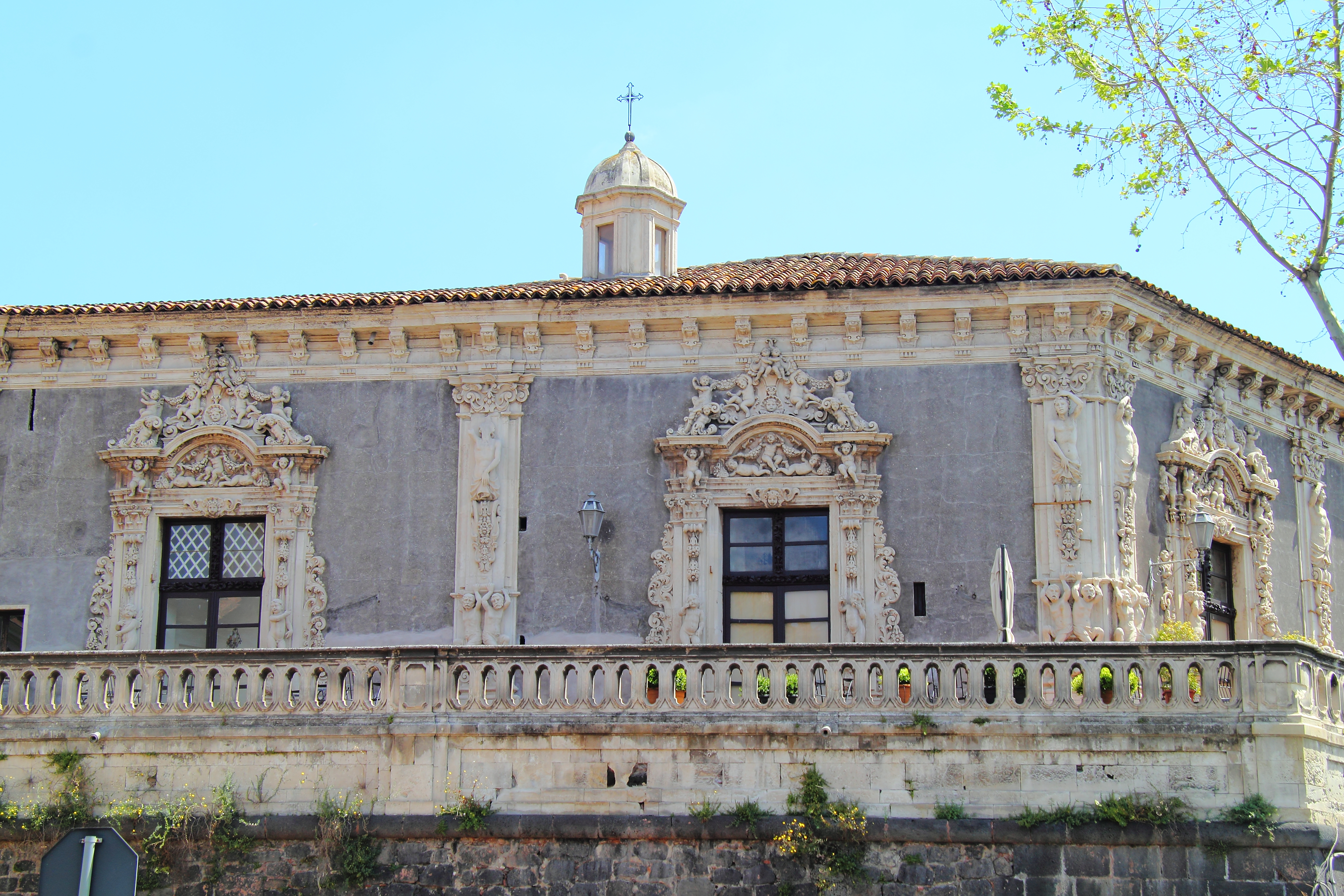
Palazzo Biscari, facing the seaside

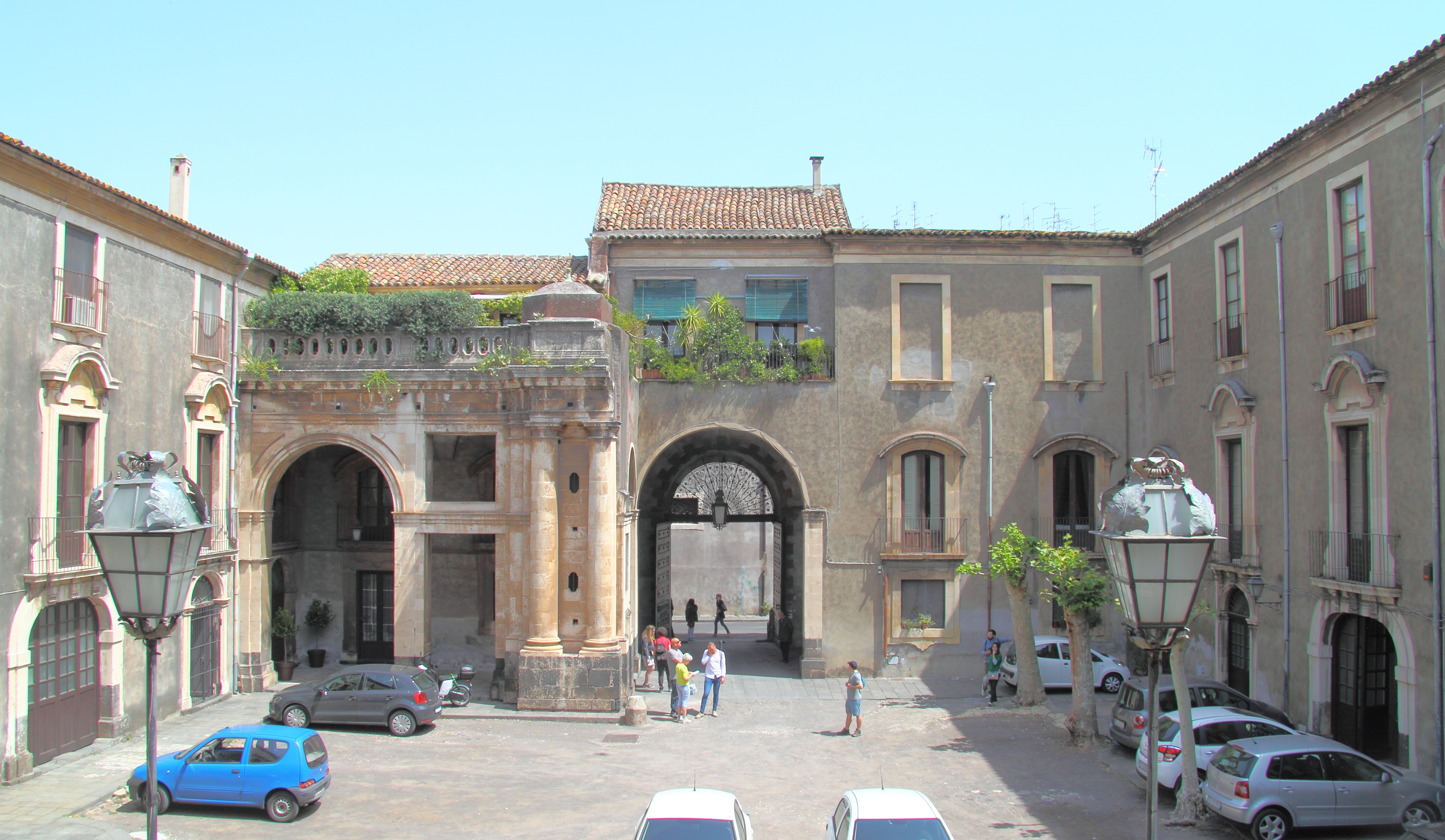
Palazzo Biscari, Inner courtyard

== History and description ==
After the devastations of the 1693 Sicily earthquake, the Prince of Biscari, Ignazio Paternò Castello, 3rd Prince of Biscari, obtained the permission to build this palace. At the time the building stood against the French king Charles V's walls of the town. After Ignazio's death in 1699, his son Vincenzo (1685-1749) and later his nephew Ignazio Paternò Castello (1714-1786), the fifth Prince of Biscari extended and completed the decoration. This latter prince complimented the work with a museum space to display his large collection of mainly archeologic and numismatic collections, now on display in the Museo Civico Castello Ursino.

The oldest section was built under Ignazio, the third prince of Biscari, who commissioned the design from the architect Alonzo Di Benedetto. Ignazio's son, Vincenzo, commissioned the elaborate decoration of the seven large second-storey windows facing the seaside, on the southwest corner of the palace on Via Cardinale Dusmet, by the Messinese sculptor Antonino Amato. The final additions eastward were designed by Giuseppe Palazzotto and, later, by Francesco Battaglia. The building was finished in 1763 and inaugurated with big celebrations.

Palazzo Biscari (Ballroom)

The outer facade on Via Museo Biscari appears somewhat dilapidated; the entrance is through a grand stone portal, decorated with facial cartouches and brackets as well as the coat of arms of the Biscari. It leads to a large inner courtyard, which features a large double outdoor entrance staircase. The Rococo interiors are elaborately frescoed and decorated with stucco. The large octagonal ballroom has a complex decoration of mirrors, stuccoes and frescos painted by Matteo Desiderato and Sebastiano Lo Monaco. A small dome has a balcony designed to contain an orchestra. The dome fresco is meant to depict the glory of the Paternò Castello di Biscari family. It is accessed through a staircase decorated in stucco within the gallery facing the sea.

Among the other rooms are the "Fief Room", featuring large canvasses of the Biscari feudataries; the "Princess Apartments", built by Ignazio V of Biscari for his wife, with pavements of ancient Roman marbles; the "Birds Gallery" and the "Don Quixote Room". There is also a museum, once housing the collection of Ignazio V, most of the material of which is now in the Castello Ursino in Catania.

== Sources ==
- Vittorio Consoli, ed. (1987). Enciclopedia di Catania (in Italian). Catania: Tringale. p. 758.
