= Sebastiano Lo Monaco (painter) =

Italian painter

Sebastiano Lo Monaco (1750–1800) was an Italian painter active in Sicily during the Rococo period.

Lo Monaco trained under Olivio Sozzi. He frescoed extensively with Matteo Desiderato in the Palazzo Biscari of Catania, including the cupola in the Loggia dei Musici, painted with a Triumph of the Biscari Family. He also frescoed in the Palazzo Reburdone in Catania. He later moved to live in Sortino, where he frescoed the church of the Natività di Maria.

There are paintings of his in a partially ruined church in Aragona. Other works of Lo Monaco are found in Lentini, a fresco of the Glory of St. Benedict in San Giuseppe in Ragusa, Mineo, Militello in Val di Catania, Siracusa, and Biancavilla.
