= Francesco Battaglia (architect) =

Italian architect

Francesco Battaglia (1701 – 1788) was an Italian architect, active in Catania, Sicily in a Baroque style. He was employed extensively during the flurry of reconstruction after the 1693 Sicily earthquake which nearly flattened his native city. He helped design the church and monastery of San Nicola l'Arena and the Palazzo Biscari. He was helped later in his career by his son Antonino and his son-in-law Stefano Ittar.
