= Etna Comics =

Annual comic book convention held in Catania, Italy

Coordinates: 37.509°N 15.102°E

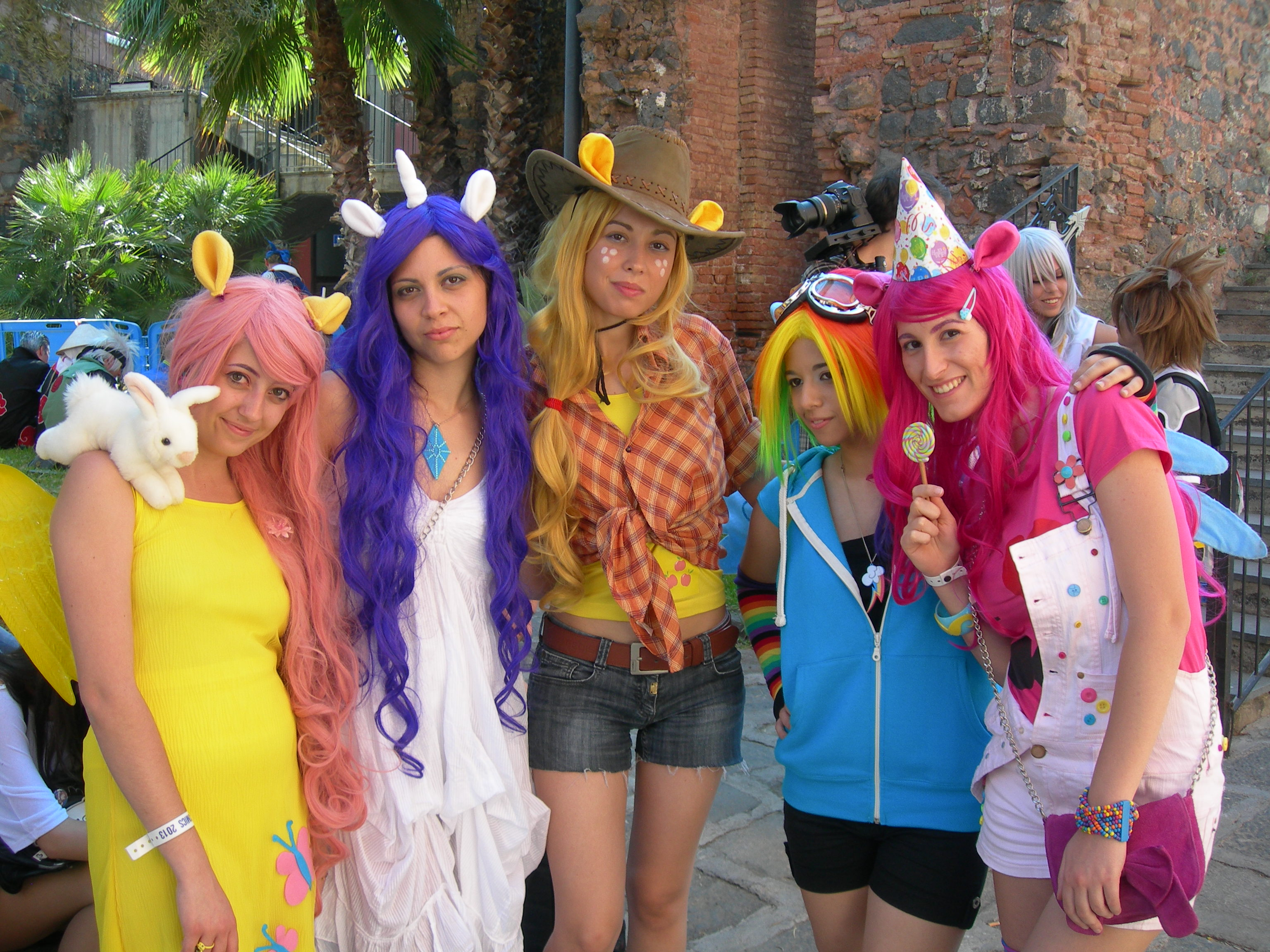
- Cosyplayers at Etna Comics 2013
- Status: Active
- Venue: Le Ciminiere Convention Center (Italian: Centro Fieristico Le Ciminiere)
- Location: Catania
- Country: Italy
- Inaugurated: 2011
- Most recent: 2025
- Attendance: 100,000 (2025)
- Organizer: Etnacrea S.r.l.
- Website: etnacomics.com

Etna Comics – International Festival of Comics, Games and Pop Culture (Italian: Etna Comics – Festival Internazionale del Fumetto, del Gioco e della Cultura Pop) is an annual convention held in Catania, Sicily at the beginning of June. The venue is The Ciminiere convention center (Italian: Centro Fieristico Le Ciminiere). As its name suggests, the festival focuses on comics, cartoons, gaming and pop culture in general. The name Etna Comics refers to Mount Etna, the volcano rising behind the city of Catania. With its 100,000 visitors it is one of the largest comic festivals in Italy, especially in the South.

== History ==
Etna Comics was inaugurated in 2011, aiming to create a place where fans of comic books further south than Naples could meet. The festival succeeded in this, becoming a national and international event, while attracting individuals like Rutger Hauer, Matt Dillon, Giancarlo Esposito, Dario Argento.

Since its first edition, the festival has kept improving and expanding in dimensions and attendance. Whereas the first and the second edition took place in just one building of Le Ciminiere, from 2014 on the festival expanded to the entire venue, outdoor areas included, taking place in a total area larger than 45,000 square meters (on many levels). The convention center includes two auditoriums/movie theaters (1200 and 600 seats) a conference room (220 seats) and an outdoor stage area (2,000 square meters) where concerts and shows are performed. Its location, in front of the sea yet right in the city center, is well served by public transport: the central railway station, the central bus station and Giovanni XXIII Metro Station of the Catania Metro are at a very small, walkable distance.

From 2017 on, a 1,500-square-meter tensile structure is set up in front of the convention center, increasing the area of the festival and hosting the board games section.

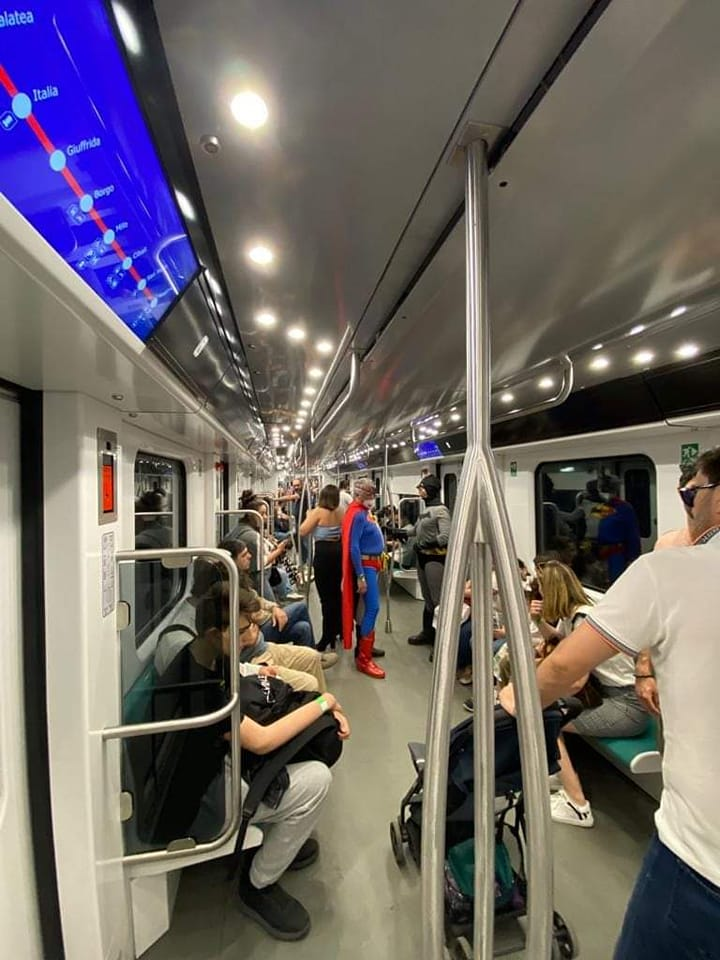
Superman and Batman doing some small talk in Catania Metro, during Etna Comics 2023

During the years, the festival generated extensions and spin-offs like Etna Comics OFF or Etna Comics – Day Zero (downsized, simpler conventions taking place in winter or in spring and meant to be an hors d'oeuvre for the main event coming up in the summer), or Etna Comics in città – Fuori salone della cultura pop. The latter one was meant to be an offshoot of the festival right in the heart of the historic center of town: installation art, shows and food stalls were arranged in Villa Pacini, a small historic park near Piazza Duomo, during the days of the main convention. So far, Etna Comics in città has taken place only in the 2019 edition of the festival. For a small period of time Etna Comics had its own official comic books shop and coffee shop in a small galleria commerciale near Le Ciminiere; this shop is now closed.

Skipping 2020 and 2021 due to sanitary restrictions related to the coronavirus pandemic, the festival came back in 2022. The poster of this edition pictured a phoenix over the Latin motto Melior de cinere surgo (I rise from my ashes in a better state than before): this refers to the phoenix sculpted in the Porta Garibaldi and it is an allegory for the city of Catania (rebuilt several times after eruptions from Mount Etna and earthquakes), for the human spirit prevailing over adversity, and for the festival coming back after a two-year stop. The 2022 edition marks the tenth anniversary of the festival. For the occasion, Etna Comics inaugurated a new section called Taboocom about adult comics and erotism in art and pop culture; the new section is meant to explore topics like freedom and sexuality, or women's rights. The tenth "comeback" edition was a striking success as the festival got over the 100,000 visitors threshold, confirming, ten years after its inception, its relevance and centrality in the national and global context.

Starting with the 12th edition, the Festival layout began to gradually change, evolve, and expand. The Le Ciminiere venue is nearing its maximum capacity and is increasingly proving inadequate to accommodate the steadily growing attendance. Additionally, there has long been a desire for the Festival to break free from the constraints of a fixed location and to begin "spilling over" into the city itself. This shift centers around Piazza Giovanni XXIII, a square located near Piazzale Chinnici, where the Festival has traditionally taken place. Situated directly above the Giovanni XXIII Metro Station, which many attendees use to reach the event, the square has now become an integral part of the Festival. It serves as the main entrance, hosting the ticket office and check-in booths. The 2025 edition marks a further step in the rethinking, reorganization, and expansion of the Festival. The event now spans three distinct areas: the first is Piazza Giovanni XXIII, which hosts the "AsianWave" section along with the ticketing area; the second remains the traditional Le Ciminiere venue; and the third is housed in the Palazzo della Cultura, which features the "Mostre" (Exhibitions) section of Etna Comics. This is the first time that a portion of Etna Comics takes place in Catania's city center.

== Structure ==
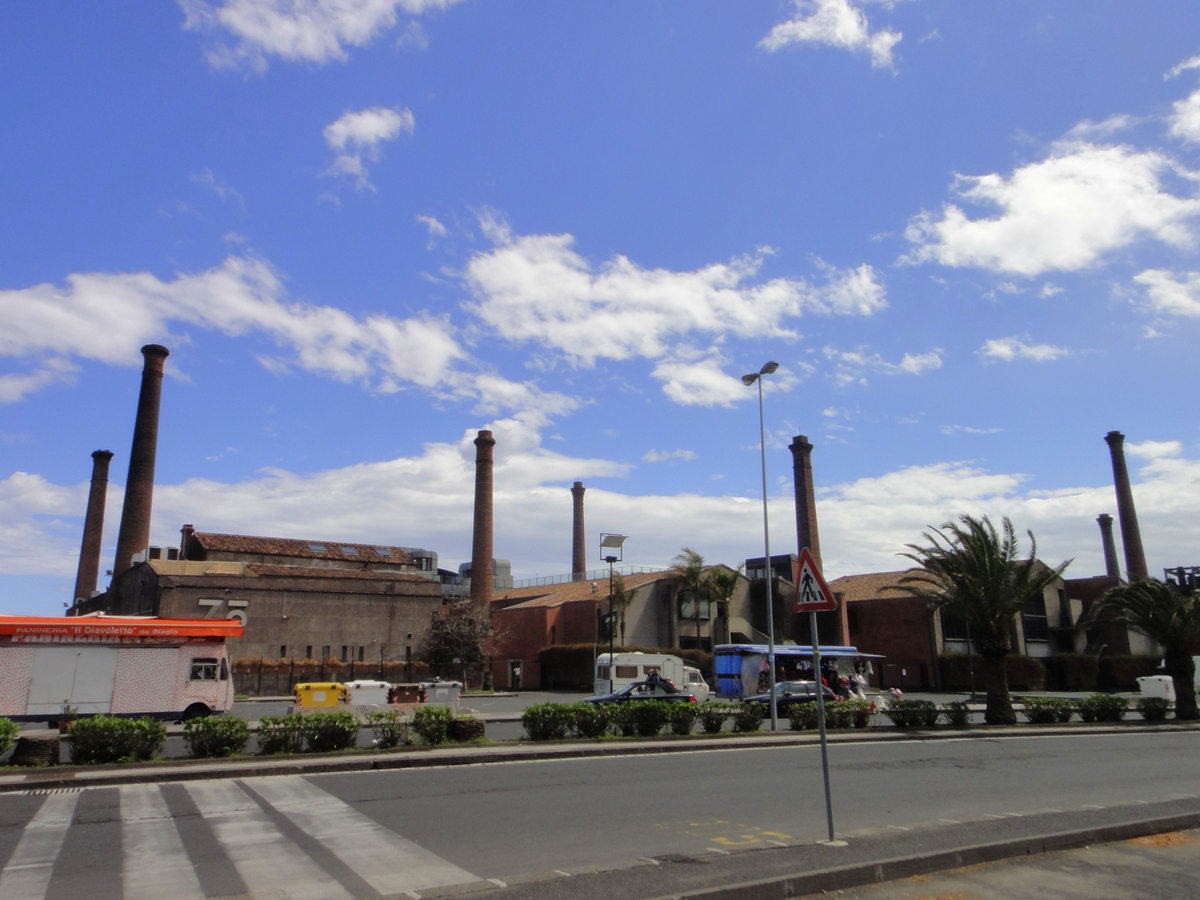
Le Ciminiere Convention Center, the venue where the festival is held

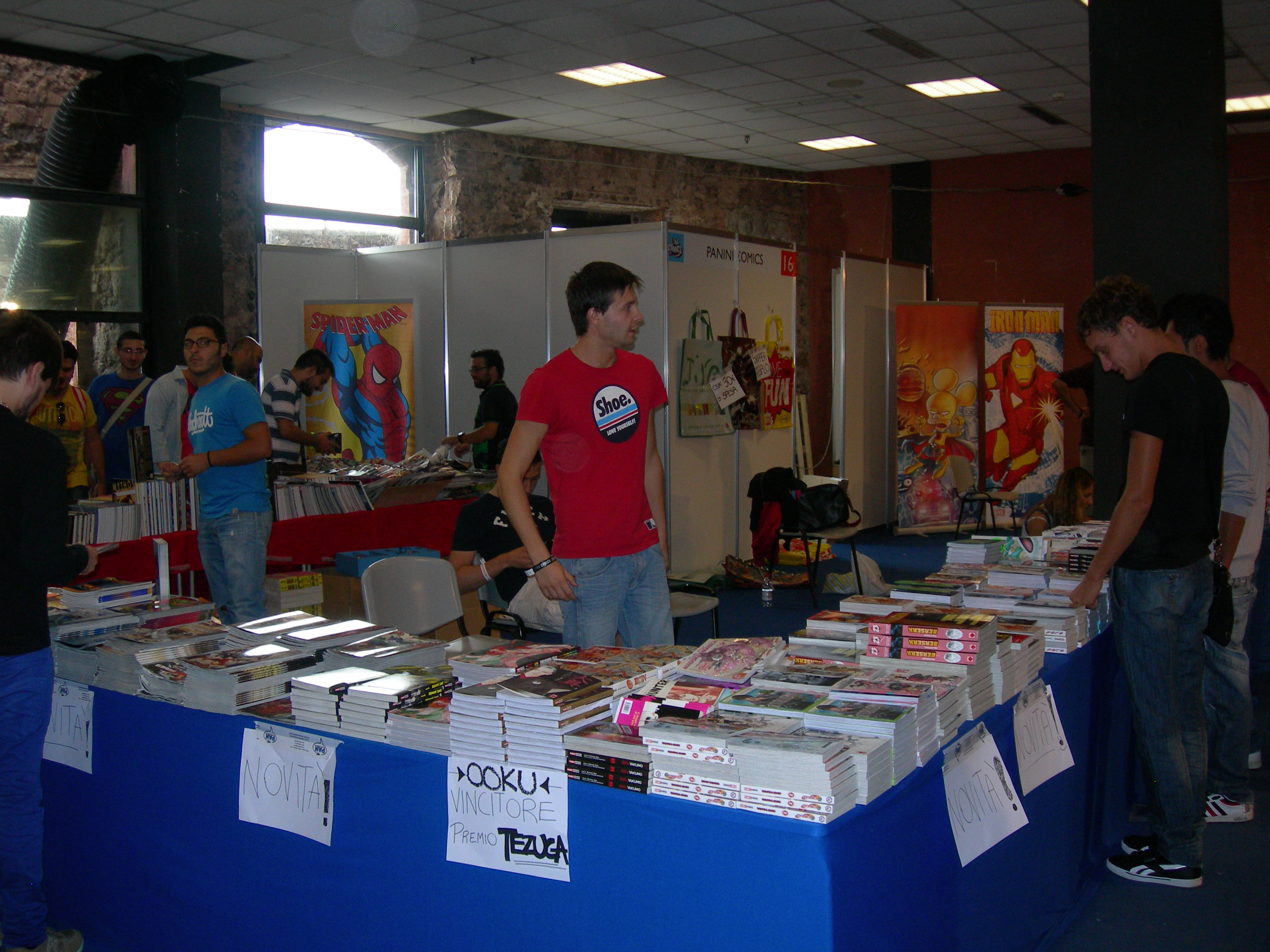
The stand of Panini Comics at Etna Comics 2012

Etna Comics usually takes place at the beginning of June and lasts about five days. Day tickets or full event passes are available to buy online or at the ticket office.

The festival is organized in the following sections:

- Comics, about comic books in general, hosting artists, publishers, comic books shops etc.; this is the original and core section of the festival;
- Games, about board games and roleplaying games, with big free-access gaming areas hosting hundreds of gaming sessions;
- Videogames, about videogames, with retrogaming and LAN parties areas;
- Family, with special activities for children and their parents;
- Letteratura Fantasy, about fantasy fiction;
- Asian Wave, about japanese and asian culture in general; Japan is famous for manga and anime production and this section is meant to explore its old and new traditions, aiming to provide a total immersion into the nipponic way of life; food stalls serving ramen and a maid café offer a chance to taste japanese cuisine; cultural phenomena of neighboring nations (e.g. K-pop) fit in this section too;
- Altrimondi, about science fiction and related sub-genres (steampunk, post-apocalyptic, etc.); this section includes big sci-fi re-enactments (which are usually set up/performed in the outdoor areas of the venue) and a Live action role-playing games area;
- Movie, about cinema and audiovisual media, with screenings, conferences, etc.;
- Taboocom, about adult comics and erotism in art; this section was presented in the 2022 edition of the festival and it is meant to explore topics like freedom and sexuality, or women's rights.
- Newtube Alley, about streaming media;
- Palco, the stage area where concerts and shows are performed;
- Mostre, the area where exhibitions are on display; several exhibits are set up every edition of the festival, focusing every time on different topics (mostly about comic book culture, but also about cinema or pop culture).

Although not covered by an official section of the event, cosplay is an important part of Etna Comics. Many cosplayers attend the convention, roaming around, being available for pictures, offering free hugs, etc. Several cosplay contests and shows are also organized.

== Editions ==
Edition	Year	Dates	Slogan or Poster Picture	Poster by	Headliners	Attendance	Ratio Att./Days	Notes
1	2011	September 9–11 (3 Days)	Il protagonista sei tu (You are the protagonist)	Lucio Parrillo	Mark Tedin, Yoshiko Watanabe, Simone Bianchi, Gualtiero Cannarsi, Fabrizio Mazzotta, Lucio Parrillo, Giorgio Vanni, Emiliano Santalucia	25,000 (Lowest)	~8,300 (Lowest)	The first edition of the festival received immediate success in terms of attendance and of reviews from the media, establishing from the start as one of the leading comic conventions in Italy.
2	2012	September 14–16 (3 Days)	L'isola che… non c'era	Paolo Cossi	David Lloyd, Paolo Cossi, Cristina D'Avena, Yoshisuke Suga, Giorgio Vanni,	40,000	~13,300	
3	2013	June 7–9 (3 Days)	Let's pop	Giovanna Casotto	Antonio Altarriba, Kim Altarriba, Volkan Baga, Angel de la Calle, Joan Mundet, James O'Barr, Robin Wood, Giovanna Casotto, Paolo Cossi, Luca Enoch, Giorgio vanni, Silvia Ziche	43,000	~14.300	From this edition on, the festival takes place in June.
4	2014	June 6–8 (3 Days)	Il meglio deve ancora venire (The best is yet to come)	Leo Ortolani	Greg Capullo, Milo Manara, Akemi Takada, Cristina D'Avena, Giorgio Vanni, Don Alemanno, Alessandro Bilotta, Doc Manhattan, Roberto Recchioni, Leo Ortolani, Sio	50,000	~16,700	From this edition on, the festival takes place throughout the whole venue of Le Ciminiere, outdoor areas included. The convention center includes two auditoriums (1200 and 600 seats) a conference room (220 seats) and an outdoor stage area (2,000 square meters) where concerts and shows are performed. The total area is larger than 45,000 square meters. The previous editions took place in just one building of the venue.
5	2015	May 30 - June 2 (4 Days)	#backtothefantasy	Don Alemanno and Sergio Algozzino	Rutger Hauer, Claudio Castellini, Riyoko Ikeda, Peter Milligan, Masami Suda, Angelo Stano, Jill Thompson, Andrea Agresti, Immanuel Casto	61,000	15,250	
6	2016	June 2–5 (4 Days)	#ecsei	Claudio Villa	Massimo Lopez, Cristina D'Avena, Zerocalcare, Simon Bisley, Esad Ribic, Midori Harada, Yumiko Igarashi, Silver, Giancarlo Berardi, Alfredo Castelli, CiccioGamer89, Ivo Milazzo, Parimpampum, Andrea Plazzi.	73,000	18.250	
7	2017	June 1–4 (4 Days)	Uzeta	Alex Maleev	Dario Argento, David Lloyd, Aldo Baglio, Giorgio Cavazzano, Marco D'Amore, Cristina D'Avena, Marco Asaro, Simone Bianchi, Max Texeira, Parimpampum	78,000	19,500	From this edition on, a 1,500 square meter tensile structure is set up in front of the convention center, hosting the board games section of the festival.
8	2018	May 31 - June 3 (4 Days)	Heliodorus	Tanino Liberatore	Barbara Bouchet, Manuela Blanchard, Hiromi Matsushita, J. M. DeMatteis, Yanick Paquette, Goran Parlov, Kazuko Tadano, Andrea Agresti, Immanuel Casto, Raul Cremona, Stefano Caselli, Giampiero Casertano, Salvo Coniglione, Gabriele Dell'Otto, Stefano Landini, Tanino Liberatore, Giuseppe Palumbo, I Soldi Spicci, Telericordi Band, Matteo Viviani	80,000	20,000	
9	2019	June 6–9 (4 Days)	Gammazita	Simone Bianchi	Giancarlo Esposito, Johnny Galecki, Goblin, Neal Adams, Dermot Power, Lelio Bonaccorso, Lorenza Di Sepio, Lorenzo Pastrovicchio, Emiliano Mammuccari, Luca Maresca, Giorgio Vanni, Casa Surace	85,000	21,250	
10	2022	June 1–5 (5 Days)	The Phoenix / Melior de cinere surgo (I rise from my ashes in a better state than before)	Gabriele Dell'Otto	Matt Dillon, Kasia Smutniak, Danika Mori, Roberto Recchioni, Angelo Stano, Vittorio Sgarbi, Roberto Arduini, Roberto Baldazzini, Simone Bianchi, Simon Bisley, Federica Cacciola, Fabio Celoni, Jacques de Loustal, Gabriele Dell'Otto, Tito Faraci, Casey Parsons, David Mack, Toshio Maeda, Alex Maleev, Jesus Merino, Paolo Mottura, Esad Ribic, Sio, I Soldi Spicci, Emiliano Santalucia, Alessandra Valenti	100,000(Highest)	20,000	This edition marks a restart, after the festival stopped for two years (2020 and 2021) due to the coronavirus pandemic and the related sanitary restrictions. This is reflected in the poster and in the slogan, which refer to the phoenix sculpted in the Porta Garibaldi. The phoenix rising from its ashes stronger and more beautiful than before is an allegory for the city of Catania which had been destroyed several times by eruptions from the Mount Etna and had always been rebuilt more beautiful than before; and, more generally, it is an allegory for the human spirit prevailing over adversity. This edition also presents a new section of the festival called "Taboocom" about adult comics and erotism in art and pop culture.
11	2023	June 1–4 (4 Days)	St. Agatha dressed in red and azure / #vivacatania A variant shows Eva Kant and Tex Willer in Aci Trezza, running away from Polyphemus on a boat named Agatha. This is a tribute to the two characters celebrating, respectively, 60 and 75 years since their first appearance in a comic.	Milo Manara / Variant by Davide Paratore	Alessandro Borghi, Caparezza, Samantha Cristoforetti, Giacomo Giorgio, Milo Manara, Ornella Muti, Federico Bertolucci, Mauro Borelli, Fabio Celoni, Kelley Jones, Rick Leonardi, Tanino Liberatore, Tiziano Menichelli, Paolo Mottura, Alessandro Pastrovicchio, Edoardo Pesci, Cecilia Randall, Serena Riglietti, John Romita Jr., Giorgio Vanni	90,000	22,500	In this edition, for the first time, Etna Comics hosts a CICAP stand. CICAP (Italian Committee for the Investigation of Claims of the Pseudosciences) is an Italian, non-profit, skeptic educational organization, founded in 1989. CICAP's main goal is to promote a scientific and critical investigation of pseudosciences, the paranormal, so-called mysteries and the unusual, with the aim of encouraging a more scientific attitude and critical thinking.
12	2024	June 6–9 (4 Days)	Luigi Pirandello / #1nessuno100mila	Zerocalcare	Igort, Itziar Ituño, Nino Frassica, Ross Mullan, Darick Robertson, Rocco Siffredi, Charles Vess, Zerocalcare, Spartaco Albertarelli, Roberto Arduini, Paolo Barbieri, Jordi Bernet, Stefano Biglia, Pasquale Del Vecchio, Ester Cardella, Stefano Caselli, Giampiero Casertano, Fabio Celoni, Francesco Centorame, Fabrizio Corselli, Emilio Cozzi, Edym, Tito Faraci, Stefano Mirti, Paolo Mottura, Nanowar of Steel, Flavio Parenti, Alessandro Pastrovicchio, Luca Perri, Marco Rizzo, Valentina Romeo, Maurizio Rosenzweig, Pasquale Ruju, Luigi Siniscalchi.	93,000	23,250	In this edition, the Ticket Office and the Check-in stall were set up in the square right over the Giovanni XXIII Metro Station. In this way, there was room for more stalls in the open area in front of the Le Ciminiere facility; moreover, a designated path was set up so that the crowd flowing to the festival did not hamper the roads close to the venue.
13	2025	May 30 - June 2 (4 Days)	Franco Battiato / Ti proteggerò dalle paure e dalle ipocondrie / dai turbamenti che da oggi incontrerai per la tua via (I will protect you from fears, from hypochondria / from the troubles that you will encounter from today – from the song La cura) A variant cover by Valentina Romeo shows Wonder Woman, portrayed as a superheroic embodiment of the song's principles of care, holding Sicily in a crystal ball.	Igort	Anastasio, Giorgio Calandrelli, Camihawke, Maccio Capatonda, Liam Cunningham, Yumiko Igarashi, Igort, Greta Thunberg, Ivan Albo, Paolo Barbieri, Nick Dragotta, Fiorenzo Marco Galli, Gianluca Impegnoso, Krisfits, Marina Lenti, Laura Mancuso, Devon Murray, Alessandro Pastrovicchio, Val Romeo, Serena Riglietti, Alex Saviuk, Scott Snyder, Francesco Vairano, Giorgio Vanni, Cliff Wright, LallaWaffle.	100,000	25,000 (Highest)	This edition marks a further step in the rethinking, reorganization, and expansion of the Festival's layout, a process that began in the previous edition. The event now spans three distinct areas. The first is located in Piazza Giovanni XXIII, encompassing the metro station of the same name and hosting the "AsianWave" section along with the ticket booths. The second area remains the traditional venue of Le Ciminiere. The third is housed in the Palazzo della Cultura, situated in the heart of Catania's city center. This area features the "Mostre" (Exhibitions) section of Etna Comics, which will be open from May 24 to June 15 and freely accessible to the public. It is the first time that part of Etna Comics takes place in the city center of Catania. This edition also features a panel titled Freedom Flotilla Coalition – From Catania to Gaza, with the participation of Liam Cunningham, Greta Thunberg, and several other peace activists. The panel focuses on the flotilla organized by the Freedom Flotilla Coalition (FFC), which was to set sail on a mission aiming to break the Israeli blockade of the Gaza Strip and deliver humanitarian aid, departing from Catania the following day.
14	2026	May 30 - June 2 (4 Days)	Pippo Baudo / The Show Must Go On (see Notes)	Giorgio Carpinteri	Caparezza, Diana Del Bufalo, Ricky Memphis, Matthew Modine, Morgan, Tuccio Musumeci, Heather Parisi, Ilenia Pastorelli, Pippo Pattavina, Yōichi Takahashi, Riccardo Azzali, Paolo Barbieri, Lorenzo Balducci, Ivan Bigarella, Giorgio Carpinteri, Casty, Fabio Celoni, Simone Crisari, Johnny Duddle, Fraffrog, Michela Frare, Marco Ghion, Matteo Oscar Giuggioli, Lee Ingleby, Guia Jelo, Juengisk, Kyrenis, Labadessa, Andrea Seth Marino, Paolo Mori, Paolo Mottura, Ariel Olivetti, Leo Ortolani, Gianluca Pagliarani, John McCrea, Angelo Rizzo, savuland, Shioriboh, Sio, Zeronikib	100,000	25,000	On November 12, 2025, a major fire destroyed the so-called Cutulisciu (flat stone), the nickname given to the large auditorium of Le Ciminiere. As a result, the festival had to rethink its entire layout: the e-sports area was relocated to the nearby Zō Centro Culture Contemporanee, a small privately owned venue adjacent to Le Ciminiere. The festival's slogan, The Show Must Go On, refers directly to the fire and to the resilience of the event, which successfully reorganized itself and took place despite the unexpected setback.
