= San Placido, Catania =

Church building in Catania, Italy

Coordinates: 37°30′10.6″N 15°05′23.6″E

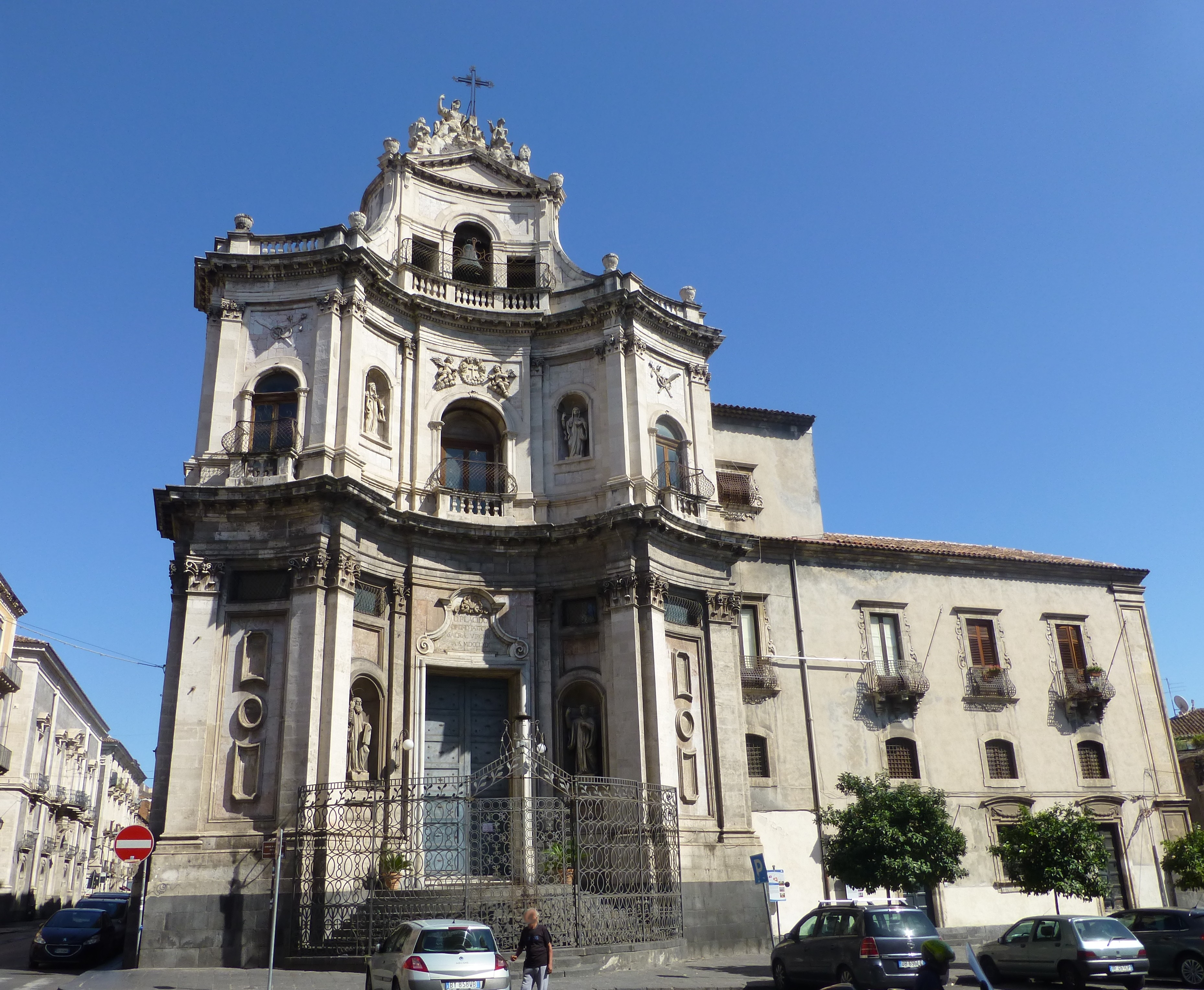
Facade of San Placido

San Placido is a Roman Catholic church and former-Benedictine monastery located on the piazza of the same name in Catania, Sicily, southern Italy. The complex, two blocks east of the Catania Cathedral, spans a polygonal block encompassed by the Via Vittorio Emanuele II (il corso) on the north, the via Landolina to the east, the via Museo Biscari on a south diagonal, and to the west the piazza San Placido and Via Porticello. Part of the convent is occupied by the Palazzo della Cultura, used for cultural activities and exhibitions. The Monastero di San Placido also serves presently as the Archivio di Stato di Catania.

== History and description ==
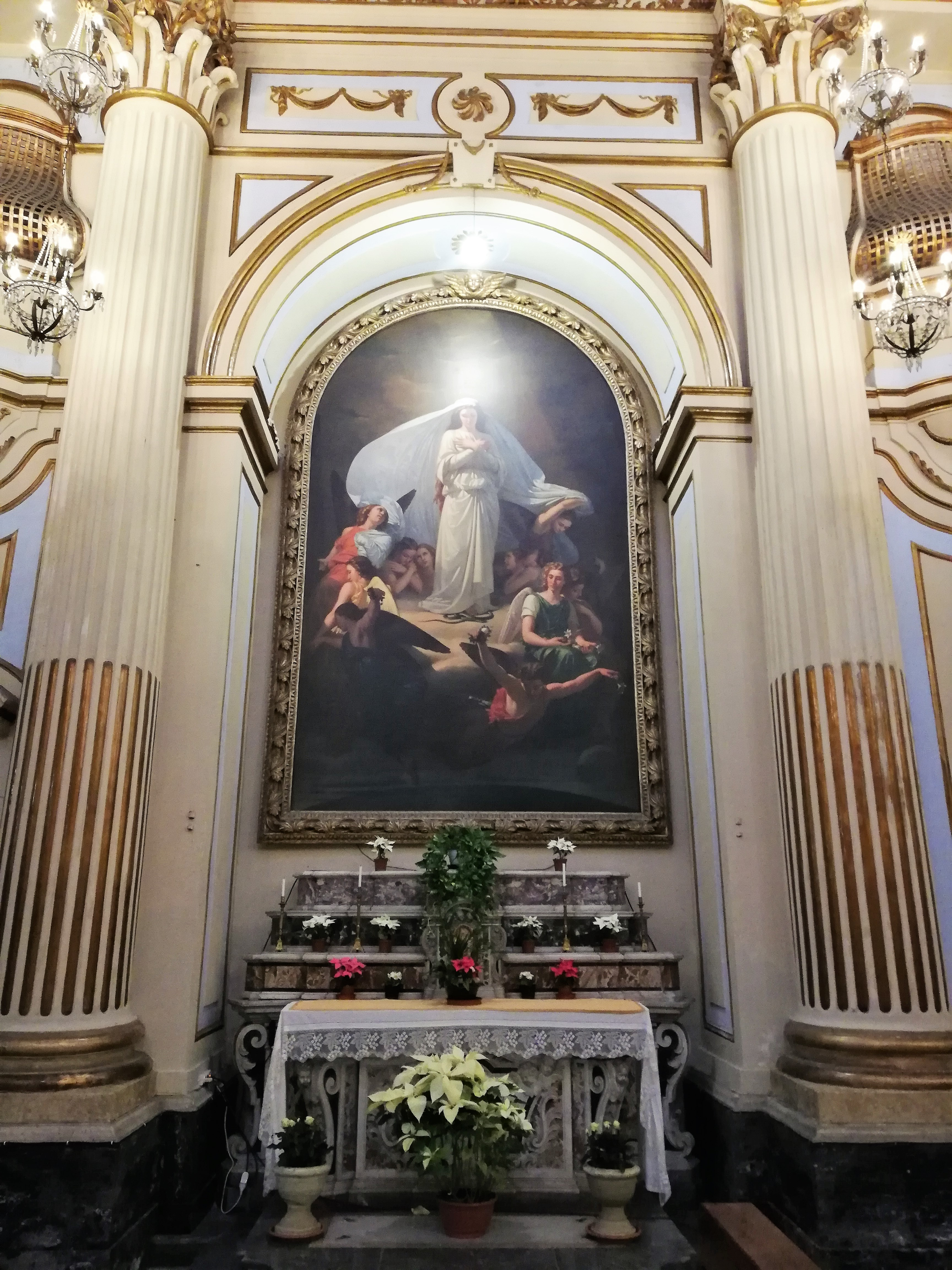
Immaculate Conception by Rapisardi

The church and monastery for nuns, following the Benedictine order, was inaugurated in 1420, putatively atop the ruins of an ancient Roman temple dedicated to Bacchus, and which legend held was also the site of a house in which Saint Agatha was born. The structures were commissioned in the early 15th century, with donations from a Ximene and Paola di Lerida. Documents highlight that the monastery also received gifts from Queen Blanche of Navarre, wife of King Martin I of Sicily. In 1549, the monastery received substantial endowments from the prominent aristocratic women, Beatrice and Costanza Ventimiglia. The monastery also incorporated the donation of the former Palazzo Platamone on the present Via Vittorio Emanuele. By the year 1600, there were some 12 monasteries for women were inside the city proper, mainly Santa Maria di Porto Salvo, Santa Chiara, Santissima Trinità, Convertite, San Girolamo, Santa Lucia, San Benedetto, Sant'Agata, San Giuliano, Santa Caterina, Santa Maria di Monte Vergine, and San Placido.

All of them suffered great losses of persons and material during the 1693 earthquake. This structure was nearly leveled and most of the nuns died. Only three nuns survived the earthquake. They were able to have a new temple begun by 1723. The marble tympanum over the portal to the church had a marble placard stating D(ivo) Placido, Sumo patrono sacrae virginis, A.S. MDCCLXIX. The monastery was able to recover and by the mid-19th century still had substantial incomes from its lands throughout the province, allowing them to purchase altarpieces for the churches such as the depiction of St Benedict (1858) from Michele de Napoli for 1500 ducats. In 1859, they commissioned a Sacrifice of Gideon and Supper at Emmaus from Michele Rapisardi. The church additionally has an altarpiece by Rapisardi depicting an Immaculate Conception. The monastery was suppressed in 1873.

The late-baroque church was designed by Stefano Ittar, and resembles the Borrominiesque facade the same architect used for the Collegiata in Catania, with a convex center, and protruding flanks with pilasters. Four statues in niches decorate the center. Balconies with balustrades and iron grills grace the second story. Along the Via V. Emanuele, the convent has a top story three arch portico. The structure was rebuilt using stones from Taormina and Siracusa.
