= Placidus (abbot) =

6th century Benedictine monk

Saint Placidus
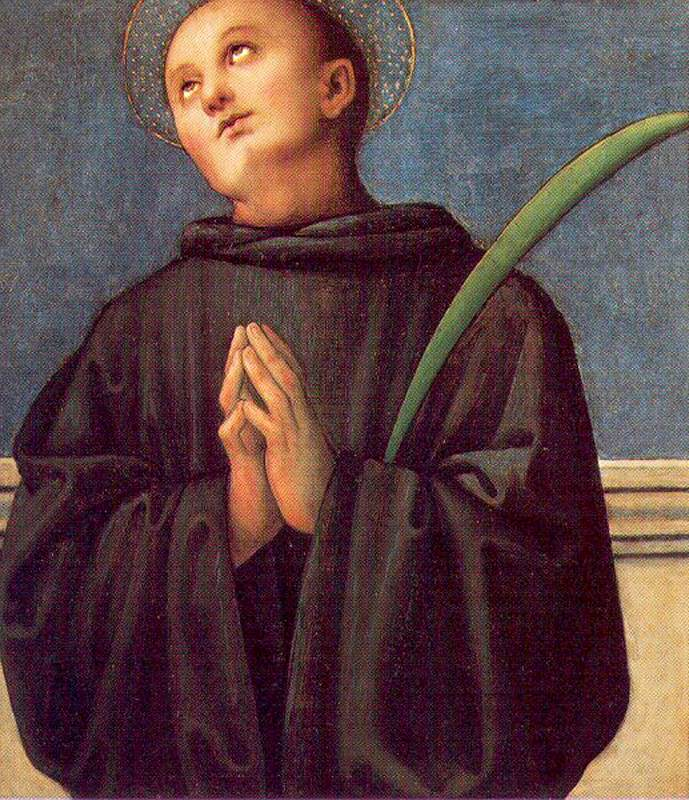
- St. Placidus, by Pietro Perugino ca.1495, at Pinacoteca Vaticana.
- Died: 6th century
- Venerated in: Catholic Church, Eastern Orthodox Church
- Feast: 5 October
- Attributes: being rescued from drowning
- Patronage: Messina (co-patron), Biancavilla, Castel di Lucio, Poggio Imperiale

Placidus (also known as Placid) (c. 515 in Rome, - c. 546 (or 541) in Messina) was a Christian monk and martyr, and a disciple of Benedict of Nursia.

Placidus was the son of the patrician Tertullus, was brought as a child to Benedict at Sublaqueum (Subiaco) and dedicated to God as provided for in chapter 69 of the Rule of St. Benedict (oblate).

Benedict later appointed Placidus as the abbot of the first Benedictine monastery in Sicily in Messina in 541. Placidus and his monk companions were killed during a pirate raid on Messina monastery around 546.

Medieval martyrologies often confound the 6th C. abbot Placidus with the earlier 3rd C. Roman martyr Placidus, and they are venerated on the same feast day (5 October).

== Life ==
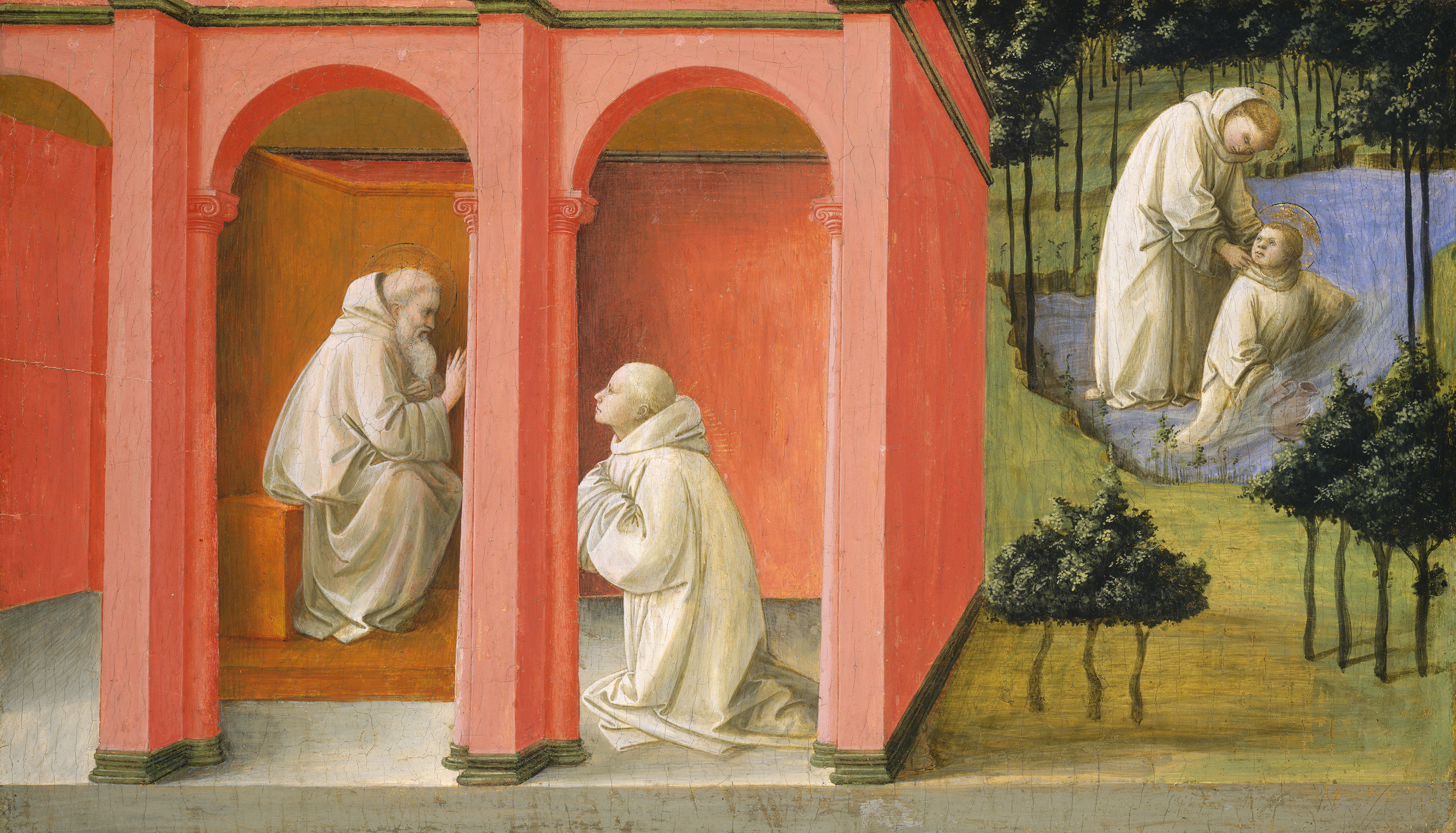
Saint Benedict orders Saint Maurus to the rescue of Saint Placidus, by Fra Filippo Lippi, ca. 1445.

Placidus was the eldest son of the patrician Tertullus of Rome. Around 522, when he was about eight years old, his father placed him under Benedict's care at Subiaco for education. Gregory the Great (Dialogues, II, vii) relates an account of young Placidus being rescued from drowning by his fellow monk, Maurus, who, at Benedict's order, ran across the surface of the lake below the monastery and drew Placidus safely to shore.

It appears certain that Placidus accompanied Benedict when, about 529, he removed to Monte Cassino, which was said to have been made over to him by Tertullus, father of Placidus.

Of his later life, little is known, but in an ancient psalterium at Vallombrosa his name is found in the Litany of the Saints placed among the confessors immediately after those of Benedict and Maurus; the same occurs in Codex CLV at Subiaco, attributed to the ninth century.

=== Messina and death ===
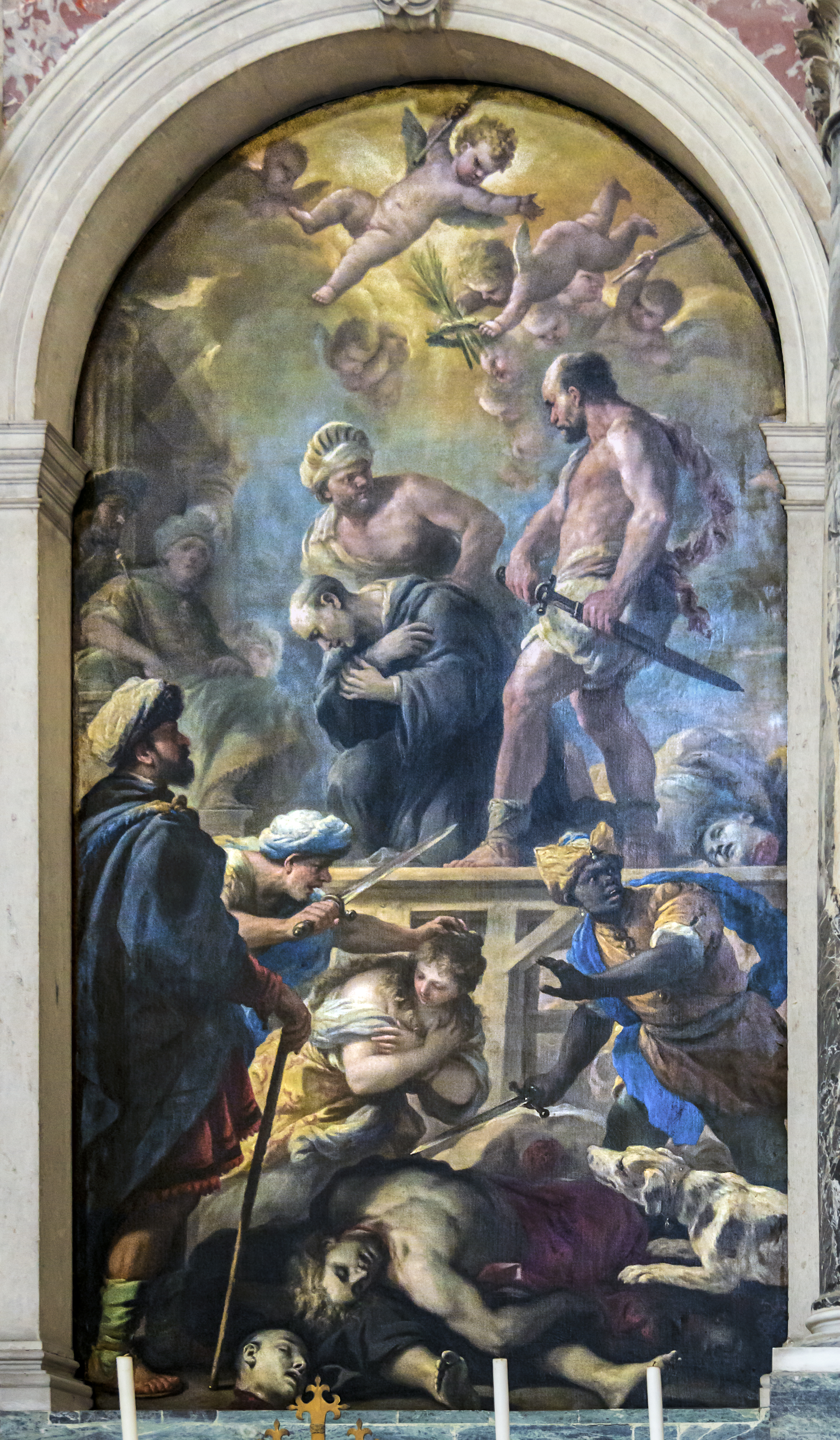
Martyrdom of St. Placidus and his companions, by Luca Giordano, 1676, at the basilica of Santa Giustina in Padua

Around 540, Benedict of Nursia sent a group of monks to Messina to found the first monastery of the Benedictine Order in Sicily, and appointed the young monk Placidus as its abbot in 541 (some date it 536). It is believed that the nucleus of Placidus's monastery was on Sicilian estates owned by his father patrician Tertullus and mother Faustina (a Messinese noblewoman), which had also been donated to Benedict. On Benedict's instructions, a church dedicated to San Giovanni Battista (St. John the Baptist) was built and attached to the monastery.

Not long after, around 546 (or 541), the Messina monastery was attacked by pirates under a certain captain Mamuca. The pirates are identified merely as "pagan barbarians", leading some historians to conjecture they may have been pagan Sclaveni (early Slavs) from the Adriatic, but other sources interpret them as Arian Vandals from North Africa or even Arian Visigoths from Spain. This was at the height of the Gothic War in Italy, so could be a group of pirates hired by one of the belligerent parties, or opportunistically operating on their own.

On Mamuca's orders, Placidus was tied to an olive tree, tortured by having his tongue cut out, and finally executed by beheading. His brothers Eutychius and Victorinus and sister Flavia were also executed, along with some thirty monks. Flavia was executed by sword through her breast, the male monks by beheading. The Messina monastery was sacked and burned down.

=== Remains ===
The Messina monastery of Placidus was later rebuilt, but attacked and destroyed again at least two more times, in Saracen raids around 669 and again 880. Confusion between these later raids and the earlier raid of the 540s has led to frequent anachronistic depictions of the martyrdom of St. Placidus by North African Muslims.

A new church dedicated to San Giovanni Battista was erected on top of the old monastery of Placidus in Messina by count Roger I of Sicily around 1086, and soon after (1099) donated to the Knights Hospitaller of St. John, who used it as a hospice for crusaders on their way to the Holy Land. The Knights Hospitaller turned it into their headquarters in Sicily.

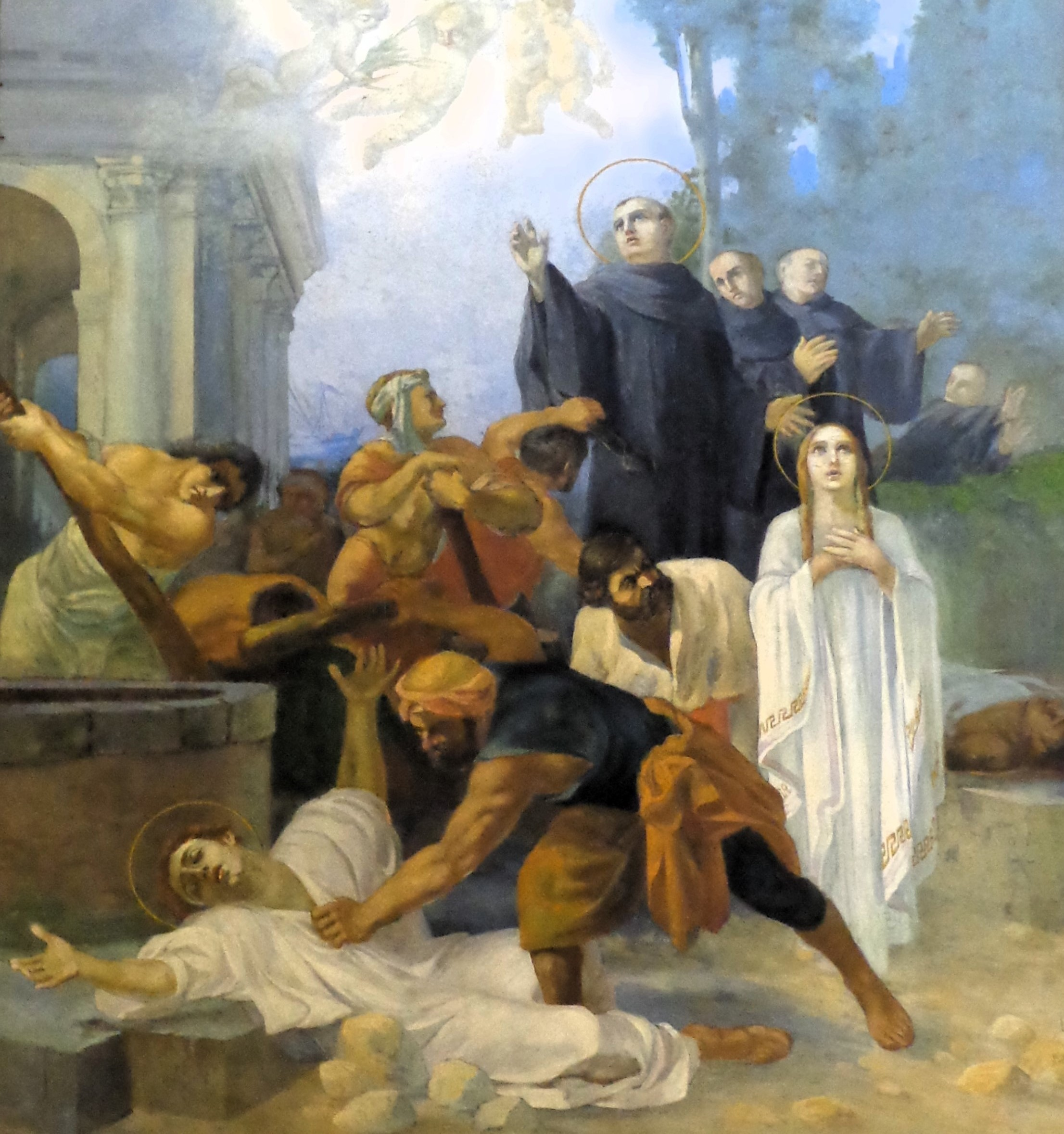
Martyrdom of St. Placidus and companions, at the church of San Giovanni in Messina

The mortal remains of Placidus and the early monk martyrs of Messina were first discovered in 1276 in the ruins of the old church attached to the original monastery. This energized the spread of the cult of St. Placidus in Sicily. A group of Sicilian noblemen in 1361 erected a Benedictine monastery at Colonero/Calonerò, about 10 miles south of Messina, and named it in his honor (it:Monastero di San Placido Calonerò). A monastery of Benedictine nuns dedicated to Placidus was established in Catania in 1420.

Apparently lost track for a while, the bodily remains were discovered again on 4 August 1588 by the Knights of St. John during restoration work on the church of San Giovanni Battista (now renamed San Giovanni di Malta) in Messina (it:Chiesa di San Giovanni di Malta (Messina)). The relics of Placidus and 37 monk martyrs were identified, and deposited in the priory church.

Long popular saints in the region, and present in Medieval Benedictine martyrologies, a bull of Pope Sixtus V (13 November 1588) formally authorized their veneration as Roman Catholic saints, and mandated annual feast days in Messina for St. Placidus and the monk martyrs on 4 August (discovery of relics) and 5 October (martyrdom date).

The Cassinese monk Felice Passero composed an epic poem of the life and martyrdom of St. Placidus in Italian ottava rima that was published in 1589 in Venice.

== Veneration ==
Placid is venerated on October 5 in the 2001 Roman Martyrology and on the same date along with Placid in the Proper Masses for the Use of the Benedictine Confederation.

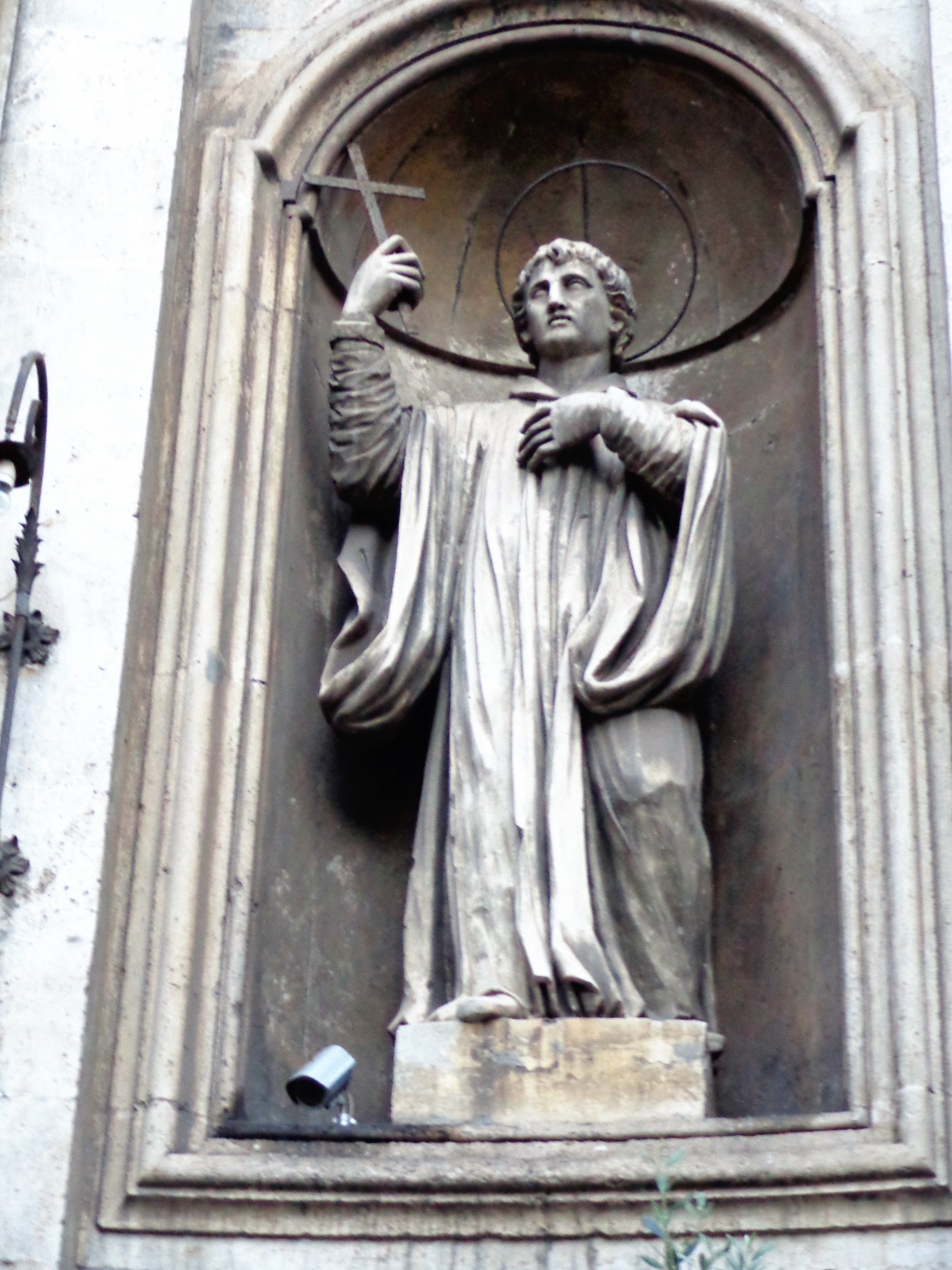
Statue of San Placido in Catania

=== Patronage ===
Placidus is the co-patron saint of Messina along with the Madonna of the Letter (Madonna della Lettera),. He is also the official patron of Biancavilla (Catania), Castel di Lucio (Messina), and Poggio Imperiale (Foggia).

Because a large portion of Easton, Pennsylvania's Italian community originally came from Castel di Lucio, Placidus is given particular veneration with an annual parade through South Side on the Sunday before Labor Day. The Sunday after is the Feast of the Holy Cross, celebrated by immigrants from the neighboring town of Santo Stefano di Camastra.

== Sources ==
- Felice Passero (1589) La vita di San Placido, e suo martirio, descritta in ottava rima dal R.P. don Felice Passero monaco cassinense. Venice. online
- D. Jean Mabillon (1703) Annales ordinis S. Benedicti occidentalium monachorum patriarchae, tomus I. Paris v.1
- Cajo Domenico Gallo (1756) Annali della città di Messina p.144
- Alban Butler (1866) The Lives of the Fathers, Martyrs, and Other Principal Saints, v.10, p.119.
- Gardner, Edmund G., ed. (1911). The Dialogues of Saint Gregory the Great (2010 ed.). Merchantville, NJ: Evolution Publishing. ISBN 978-1-889758-94-7.
- Don Giuseppe Sciortino, Vita e Novena di San Placido (no publication information)
- Don Nino Sciortino, Vita e Novena di San Placido, protettore di Castel di Lucio (1931)
