= Stefano Ittar =

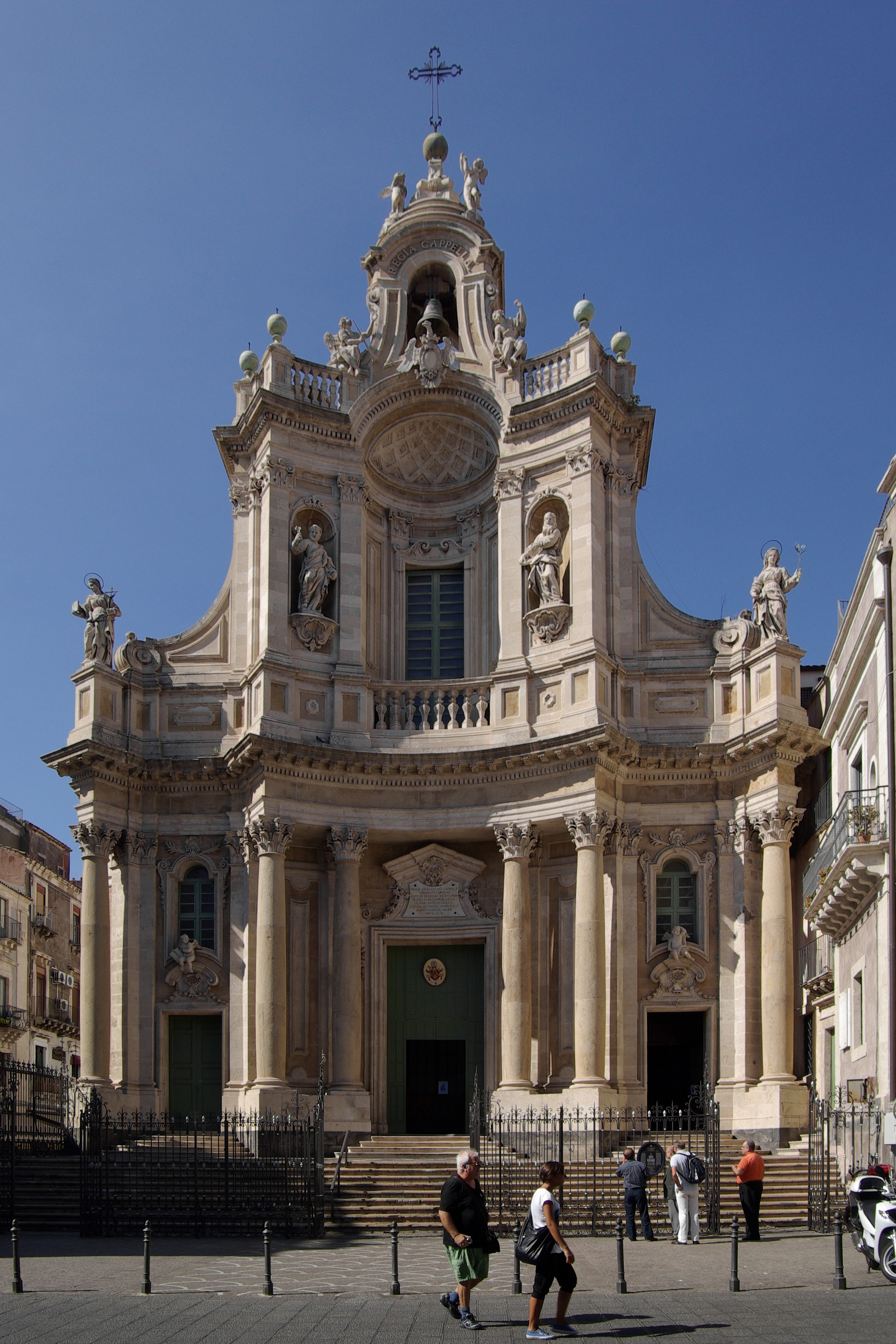
Basilica della Collegiata in Catania, finished circa 1768.

Stefano Ittar (March 15, 1724 – January 18, 1790) was a Polish-Italian architect.

== Biography ==
Ittar was born in Owrucz (then in the Polish–Lithuanian Commonwealth, now in Ukraine), where his father, a member of one of Italy's aristocratic families the Guidone de Hittar, had fled following a disagreement with the Grand Duke of Tuscany.

While Ittar was still young his family moved to Rome, where under the patronage of Cardinal Alessandro Albani Ittar later studied architecture at this time influenced in Rome by the concepts of Francesco Borromini.

After a brief period in Spain Ittar settled in Catania in 1765. Catania had largely recovered from the damage caused by the earthquake of 1693, largely due to the efforts of the city architect Giovanni Battista Vaccarini, who had rebuilt vast tracts of the city in Baroque style, such as the area around the Cathedral. It was at this time Ittar met Don Ignazio Paternò, Prince of Biscari, who at this time was reconstructing the massive Palazzo Biscari. The Prince of Biscari one of the richest and most cultivated of Sicily's many aristocrats was to become Ittar's patron for many years. Ittar was later to marry Rosaria Battaglia, the daughter of Francesco Battaglia, the architect of the Palazzo Biscari.

Eventually Ittar was employed to work on the great palazzo itself; he is believed to be responsible for much of the architecture in the inner courtyards and upper floors. This was the beginning of a form of partnership with Battaglia, and together they worked on various ecclesiastical buildings and Catania's huge Benedictine Monastery of San Nicolò l'Arena, the largest in Europe. Here Ittar was responsible for the dome of the monastery's church which was constructed between 1768 and 1783. He also designed the semi-circular piazza in front of the unfinished facade of the church. Furthermore, the partnership was responsible for the Porta Ferdinandea (now the Porta Garibaldi), a city gate built with bands of black lava in the Baroque style and adorned by trumpeting angels and trophies. The architects went on to design the Piazza Palestro.

In 1767, Ittar was sufficiently renowned to go into business alone; buildings he designed in this period include the church of San Martino dei Bianchi, his first concave façade. The following year he completed what is considered his masterpiece: the facade of the Basilica della Collegiata, a church probably designed by Angelo Italia. This Sicilian Baroque building is a classic example of chiaroscuro technique. Ittar later designed the Church of San Placido, which has a facade adorned by a central Sicilian bell tower surmounted by statuary.

Following Vaccarini's death some years later, Ittar was invited by the governors of Catania to produce a contemporary plan of the city, highlighting the new straight streets an example of Baroque town planning. This map was later made into an engraving and mass-produced.

By 1783, his long term project designing the Benedictine monastery came to an end. Ittar was by this time one of Catania's most respected and influential architects and town planners. However, this was the year his life was to change completely. He was invited to Malta to design a new library for the Order of St. John of Malta, whereupon Ittar and his family seem to have moved immediately to Valletta. Here began a period of works created in a different style of architecture. The new library was of a classical design, complete with columns, arches, windows and pediments, and not a broken pediment or curved facade in sight. The vast library, reminiscent of a huge classical palace, was finally completed in 1796, five years after Ittar's death.

It was said, at the time, that Ittar had committed suicide because of errors of architectural judgement leading to structural problems with the library; however, while the profusion of vast windows make the library a cold and draughty place of work, there is no evidence of severe structural error or other problems in the design. Records of his death show him dying in communion with the church, and as having received the last rites, a sacrament which would not have been administered in the case of a suicide.

Two of his sons, Enrico and Sebastiano, also became architects who achieved some notability.

== Sources ==
- Gangi, G. (1964). Il Barocco nella Sicilia Orientale. Rome.
