= Giuseppe Palazzotto =

Italian architect (1702–1764)

Giuseppe Palazzotto (1702 – 1764) was an Italian architect, active in Catania, Kingdom of Sicily. He used a Baroque style, and was employed extensively during the flurry of reconstruction, after the 1693 Sicily earthquake which nearly flattened his native city.

Giuseppe helped design the church and monastery of San Giuliano, Santa Chiara, Sant'Agostino, Palazzo Zappala, Palazzo del Senato, and the Palazzo Biscari.
