= Santa Rita in Sant'Agostino, Catania =

Church in Catania, Sicily, Italy

Coordinates: 37.50231°N 15.08241°E

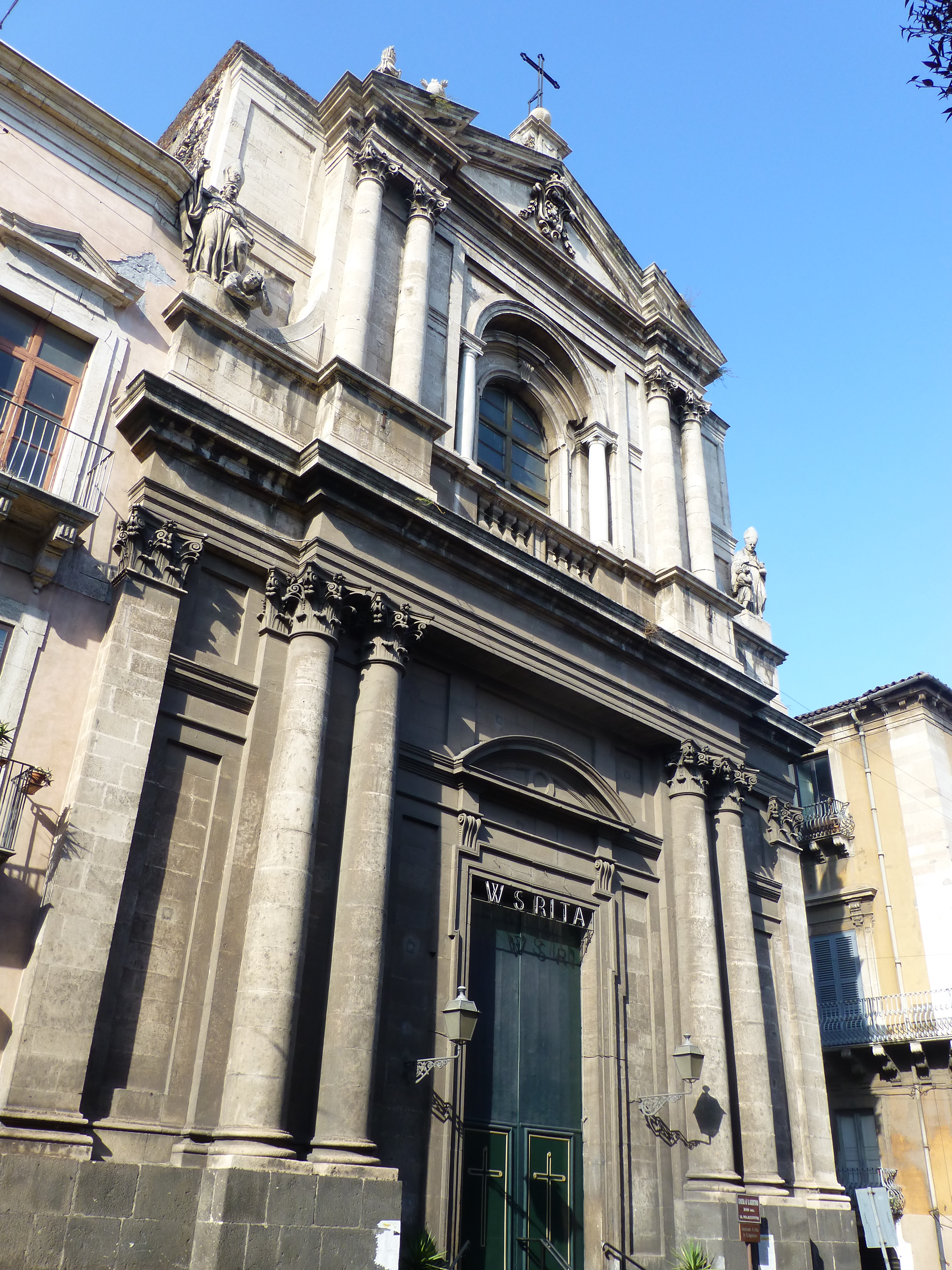
Facade of the church

Santa Rita in San'Agostino, sometimes just called Sant'Agostino, is a Roman Catholic parish church and sanctuary, located on Via Vittorio Emanuele II #318, in Catania, region of Sicily, southern Italy. The church was formerly attached to an Augustinian convent, and known as Sant'Agostino. But in the 20th century was dedicated as a sanctuary to Santa Rita of Cascia.

== History and description ==
Monastic followers of St Augustine putatively arrived to Eastern Sicily fleeing the Vandal invasion of North Africa in the late 5th century. Construction of a monastery and church in Catania is documented since 1209. Construction was endowed by the nobleman Ferdinando Guerriero, and the church was initially dedicated to San Giacomo (St James). However, in 1577 all the monks died from the plague, and the town elected to burn all the contents of the monastery. It was rebuilt in 1615 with designs putatively by Giuseppe Palazzotto. The monks rebuilt a monastery by 1637. Destroyed by the 1693 Sicily earthquake, reconstruction was slow, and the incomplete structure was heavily damaged by the 1818 earthquake. The monastery was suppressed in 1866.

The facade is rather sober in comparison to other churches in Catania. It is enlivened by two statues at the first story roofline: on the left is St Augustine treading upon heretics, while on the right is St Thomas Villanova showing charity to a child.

The interior has wooden statues sculpted by Giuseppe Stuflesser of Ortisei. The apse reutilizes columns (spolia) from an Ancient Roman building. Among the altarpieces from the church are:

- St Emidius with Christ, Madonna, and St Agatha (circa 1750) by Alessandro Vasta
- Madonna of the Girdle with St Augustine and St Monica (1700) by Nicolò Mignemi il Vecchio
- Charity of St Thomas of Villanova (1809) by Giuseppe Zacco
- Ecstasy of San Nicola da Tolentino.. (1804–1805) by Zacco
