= San Martino dei Bianchi, Catania =

Church building in Catania, Italy

Coordinates: 37.50259°N 15.08597°E

San Martino dei Bianchi is a Roman Catholic church located on Corso Vittorio Emanuele II, #189 (with an entrance at Via San Martino 14) in the center of Catania, Sicily, southern Italy.

== History and description ==
The present church, with its undulating late-Baroque facade, was built in the 18th century, commissioned by the Arch-confraternity of the Bianchi, based on designs by the architect Stefano Ittar (1724-1790). The previous church of the lay confraternity had been destroyed in the 1693 earthquake. The confraternity provided comfort and burial assistance to those condemned to death. Further down along Via San Martino, at number 10 on the second floor, a plaque commemorates the inn where Goethe stayed during his Italian Journey through Catania in 1787.
