= CiccioGamer89 =

Italian YouTuber

- Born: Mirko Alessandrini; January 27, 1989 (age 37); Rome, Italy
- Occupations: YouTuber; writer

Twitch information
- Years active: 2018–2019
- Genre: Gaming
- Followers: 401 thousand

YouTube information
- Channels: CiccioReaction89; CiccioGameplay89; CiccioGamer89_Reaction
- Years active: 2012–present
- Genres: Let's Play; vlog; comedy; commentary; satire
- Subscribers: 3.70 million
- Views: 1.69 billion
- Last updated: 21 March 2026

Mirko Alessandrini (born January 27, 1989), known online as CiccioGamer89 or simply Ciccio, is an Italian YouTuber and streamer. He joined YouTube on July 8, 2012, and his channel gained over three million subscribers, making him the 40th most-subscribed Italian YouTuber as of 2023.

In his channel he mainly posts gameplay videos, but he also created a series of cooking videos called "In cucina con Ciccio" and several videos dedicated to his weight loss journey. He has opened multiple burger restaurants in Italy.

== Biography ==
Alessandrini was born in Rome, Italy, to a poor family. When he was young he worked as a porter and baker.

== Internet career ==
=== Beginning (2012–2015) ===
"Hakuna matata, ragazzi! Ben ritrovati dal vostro CiccioGamer89."

— Mirko Alessandrini's characteristic intro to his YouTube videos

Alessandrini originally registered a YouTube account in the early 2010s, but after reaching 1000 subscribers, YouTube closed his channel. On 8 July 2012, he joined YouTube again under the nickname CiccioGamer89.

In his early years as a YouTube creator, Alessandrini focused on video game commentaries and let's play about Minecraft (Note: CiccioGamer89 (4 September 2023). Minecraft Xbox 360 : Il Tour Mega Galatticoooo del mio Mondo! (in Italian). CiccioGamer89 – via YouTube.) and Slenderman, (Note: CiccioGamer89 (3 September 2012). Slenderman Sanatorium : Ancora più cattivo e Infame (in Italian). CiccioGamer89 – via YouTube.) keeping his facial appearance secret. After a month, he showed his face in a video for the first time and revealed the reason that prompted him to choose the nickname with which he became famous. On 8 September 2012, he made his first vlog. (Note: CiccioGamer89 (8 September 2012). 1° Vlog : Finalmente ci facciamo due chiacchiere. ( Novità, aggiornamenti e tanto altro ) (in Italian). CiccioGamer89 – via YouTube.) During these first years, he increased his popularity with the two "trademarks" of his channel: the Hermit crab that acts as both the logo and mascot of the channel and his characteristic greeting at the beginning of each video, "Hakuna matata, ragazzi!".

In a short time, Alessandrini became a point of reference for the Italian YouTube community, with his videos about FIFA, MotoGP 15, Clash Royale and his format In Cucina con Ciccio. The format consisted in advertising cooking videos. In February 2014 he reached 100.000 subscribers on YouTube and after ten months he reached 500.000 subscribers.

=== Golden Button and "Nutellagate" (2016) ===
On 2 July 2016 he received the YouTube Golden Button for 1,000,000 subscribers. (Note: CiccioGamer89 (2 July 2016). Premiazione GOLDEN BUTTON a Google (in Italian). CiccioGamer89 – via YouTube.) On 1 October 2016, while he was signing autographs at Romics, an eighteen-year-old boy hit Alessandrini in the eye with a Nutella croissant and fled into the crowd; after about half an hour he returned, managing to hit him with another croissant the second time. This time, however, the YouTuber's guards managed to capture the eighteen-year-old and brought him in front of Alessandrini. The boy began to cry in front of him, and so Alessandrini decided not to file a complaint with him. Two days later Alessandrini uploaded a video with his reactions, where he expressed all his disappointment towards those who use YouTube to incite gestures of that kind and create hatred towards him. The event was called "Nutellagate" by the web.

On 5 October, the attacker, who owns the Zedrik HD channel, uploaded a video in which he claimed responsibility for the act, calling it "a joke"; he also said he had spoken to Alessandrini to apologize. The fact was later confirmed by a video uploaded to the latter's channel.

=== Sleeve Gastrectomy, first books and Twitch (2017–2021) ===
Suffering from obesity, Alessandrini underwent a bariatric surgery operation together with his brother Simone in 2017, through the sleeve gastrectomy procedure. In February 2017 he published an autobiographical book Io, me e me stesso". Also in 2017, he was nominated in the top 3 in the Gameplay category of the Web Star Awards.

In the same year he start doing videos about Fortnite Battle Royale and in 2018 he published his second book CiccioGamer89 Presenta Fortnite. Trucchi e Segreti.

In November 2018, Alessandrini joined the streaming platform Twitch for one year.

In 2019, two years after the first operation, Alessandrini and his brother began another operation. In the same year he published his second book about Fortnite Battle Royale and eSport, and in 2020 he published his first cooking book.

In March 2020, during the COVID-19 pandemic, he started a fundraiser during a livestream, raising €2300 to be donated to the Spallanzani Hospital in Rome. In the next months, during another livestream in collaboration with Tom's Hardware and the Italian YouTubers Favij and Anima, Alessandrini raised another €17.209.

=== Legal issues and store opening (2022–present) ===
In early November, Alessandrini announced a collaboration with Durex Italia for the creation of limited edition condoms with a hermit crab drawn on the box, called "Durex Let's go".

On 19 November 2022 Alessandrini was reported by the Guardia di Finanza for tax evasion for €400,000, meaning he would not have declared income for 1 million euros. According to the reconstructions, Alessandrini would have failed to declare to the tax authorities more than one million euros in compensation in the last five years. With these figures, having exceeded the minimum thresholds of punishment established by current legislation, once the financiers of the Provincial Command of Rome discovered the omission, the complaint was immediately triggered.

During the investigations, the military reconstructed in detail the volume of the entrepreneur's and the company's turnover thanks to an analysis of the partnership contracts stipulated with the multimedia giant Google Ireland and with some sponsorship agencies.

Alessandrini gave a first update on the matter via his Instagram profile, where he explained that he was not a tax evader and that his lawyers were already working on the case.

In January 2023 he received further criticism for his political point of view expressed during a live broadcast, praising a one-party state. Following the controversy generated by his statements during a live broadcast, Cicciogamer89 published a video in which he clarified that his words had been taken out of context. He explained that he did not intend to praise a one-party regime, but was expressing an idealistic thought about a more united politics focused on the common good. In the video, the streamer stressed that he is not a political expert and that his comment reflected a personal opinion, not a political manifesto.

In March 2022, he published his second cookbook, I Burger di Ciccio. Over the next two years, while occasionally playing Supercell video games, he gained increased popularity with his cooking series In Cucina con Ciccio. (Note: CiccioGamer89 (3 February 2024). 🍔 L' AMATRICIANO 🍔 E' ARRIVATO ! i Burger di CiccioGamer89 (in Italian). CiccioGamer89 – via YouTube.) This success led him to open several burger restaurants named I Burger di CiccioGamer89 in major Italian cities such as Rome, Bologna, Naples, and Turin.'" These were not physical fast food restaurants, but rather delivery-only kitchens operating through Deliveroo. On 30 June 2024, he also opened his first trade card shopping center in Imperia with the Jacopo Privitera, the leader of the Italian Pokémon Prestige Community. He also founded the society "CiccioGamer TCG (Trading Card Games)". For the occasion, he organized an inaugural event with fans in Piazza Unità d'Italia, prompting local authorities to issue a traffic regulation ordinance in anticipation of the gathering.

One year after the launch of the delivery-only kitchens, Alessandrini began a collaboration with the company Star Kitchen, and on 15 June 2025 he opened his first physical burger restaurant in Rome. The menu featured some of his most popular creations from the video series "In cucina con Ciccio", including signature burgers that combine Roman cuisine with classic burger elements, such as the Carbonaro89 and the AmatriCiccio.

== Personal life ==
He was in a relationship with Patrycja Izabela Leszczyszyn for six years. Since 2019, he has been dating Veronica (known on the internet as BigLove), an English teacher.

== Gameography ==
| Year | Game | Type | Platform(s) | Developer | Role / Notes | Ref. |
|---|---|---|---|---|---|---|
| 2021 | Fortnite Battle Royale | Battle royale | Windows, macOS, PlayStation 4, PlayStation 5, Xbox One, Xbox Series X/S, iOS, Android, Nintendo Switch | Epic Games | Himself (voice) | (Note: CiccioGamer89 (16 February 2021). Sono andato a MILANO per doppiare la voce in FORTNITE! (in Italian). CiccioGamer89 – via YouTube.) |
