= Basilica della Collegiata =

Church in Catania, Sicily, Italy

- Ancient Royal and Eminent Basilica Collegiate of Our Lady of the Alms
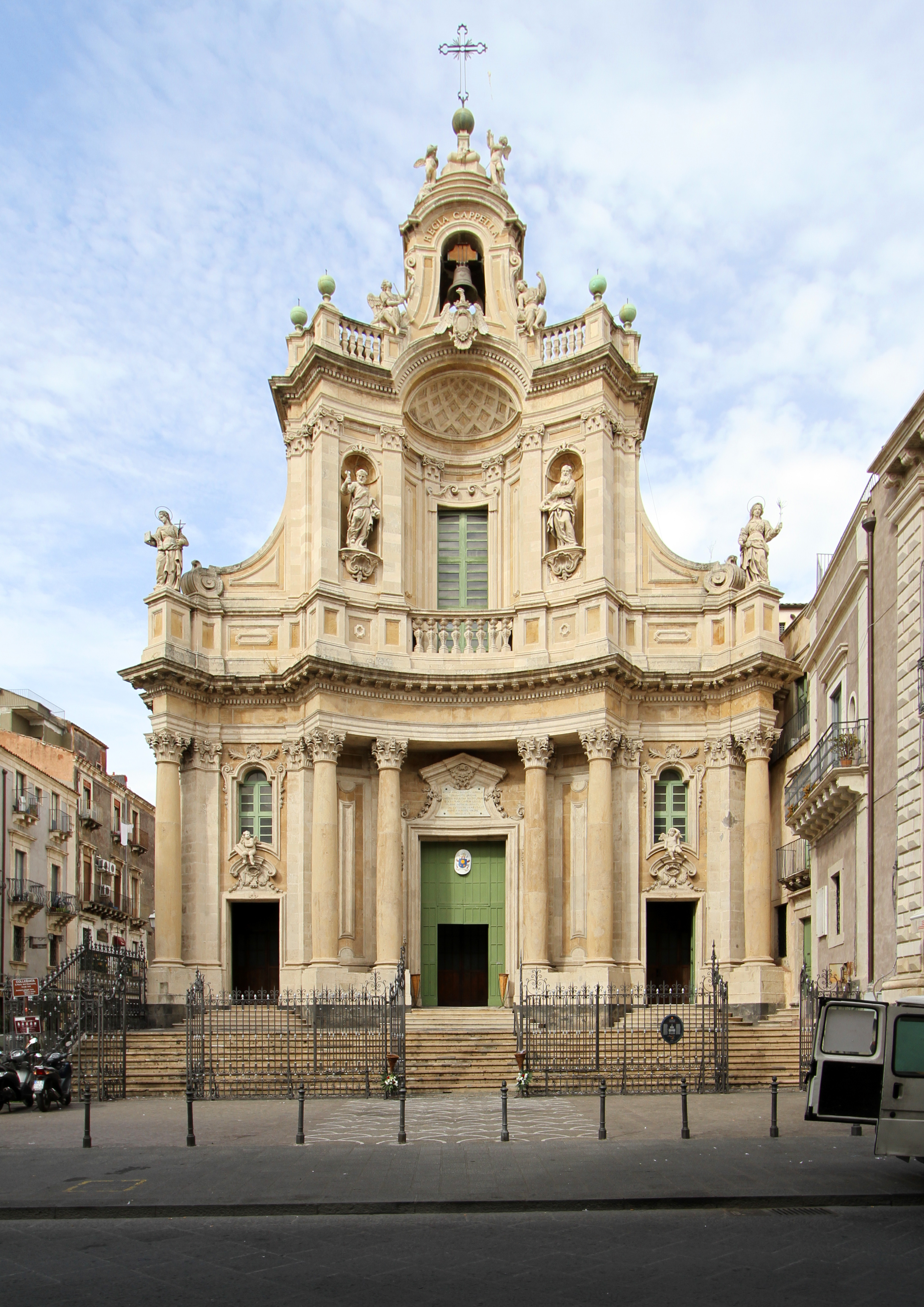
- Façade of the Basilica

- Map of Sicily
- 37°30′15.2″N 15°5′11.5″E
- Country: Italy
- Denomination: Roman Catholic Church

Architecture
- Style: Sicilian Baroque
- Completed: 1768

The Ancient Royal and Eminent Basilica Collegiate of Our Lady of the Alms (in italian known as Antichissima Regia ed Insigne Basilica Collegiata di Maria Santissima dell'Elemosina), better known as Basilica della Colleggiata, is a church in Catania, Sicily, southern Italy. Finished in 1794, it is an example of Sicilian Baroque.

== History ==
The church was firstly built in the early Middle Ages, but rebuilt in the early 18th century, after the earthquake of 1693 that had destroyed most of the city. The church was elevated to a collegiate church by Pope Eugenius IV.

== Architecture ==
The design of the church is attributed to Angelo Italia (1628–1700), who changed the orientation of the previous edifice destroyed by the earthquake, in order to have it facing the new via Uzeda (current Etnea Street) according to the new urban plan for the city. The façade, designed by Polish architect Stefano Ittar (1724–1790), is one of the most notable examples of late Baroque in Catania.

The façade has two orders, the first of which featuring six stone columns, surmounted by a balustrade. The second order has a large central window, with, at the sides, four large statues of St. Peter, St. Paul, St. Agatha and St. Apollonia. Over the second floor is a central element housing the bells. The second floor utilizes pilasters instead of columns.

The church is accessed through a large staircase on which, delimiting the parvise, is a wrought iron parapet. In the south corner of the church, abutting the apse on via Manzoni, is a small two retail outlet building, Negozio Frigeri, designed in 1909 by Tommaso Malerba in Liberty style.

== Interior ==
The interior follows a common basilica plan, with a nave and two aisles divided by two pilasters, and three apses. The central apse is rather elongated to house the rectory.

The right aisle is home to a baptistery and three altars each with an altarpiece honoring a specific saint. At the end of the aisle is the altar dedicated to the Virgin of the Immaculate Conception, preceded by a marble balaustrade. Above is a marble statue depicting this Marian veneration. In the apse of the nave is the high altar, with an icon of the Virgin with a Child, a copy of a Byzantine original in the sanctuary of Biancavilla. Behind the altar are an 18th-century wooden organ and a wooden choir.

The left aisle, in the apse area, houses the Holy Sacrament Chapel, with a polychrome marble altar. The vaults and the dome were frescoed in 1896 by Giuseppe Sciuti with scenes of the Life of Mary, Angels and Saints. An inventory from 1847, names an altarpiece depicting Sant'Apollonia by Olivio Sozzi.

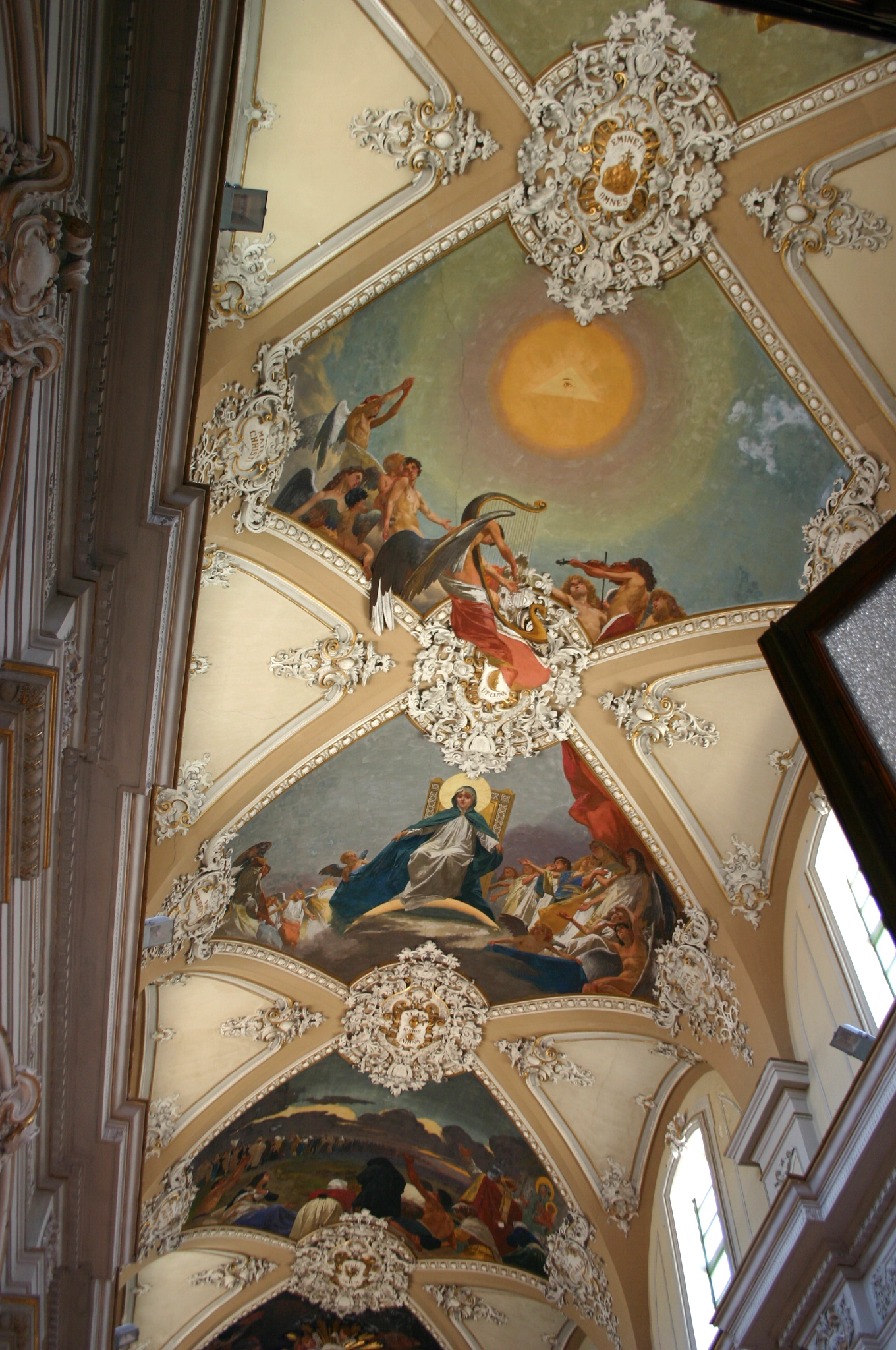
Vault frescoes in the interior

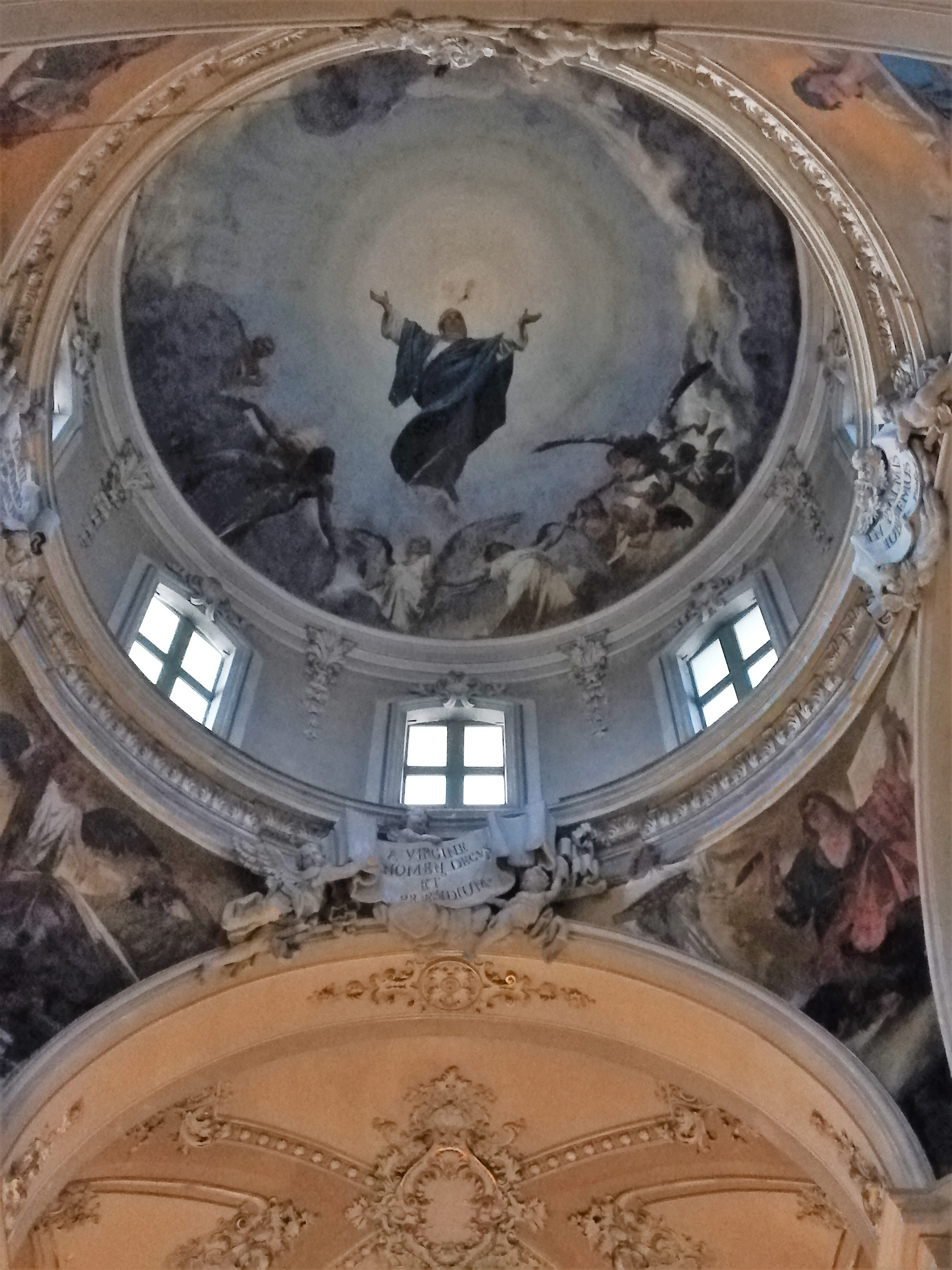
Dome fresco by Sciuti

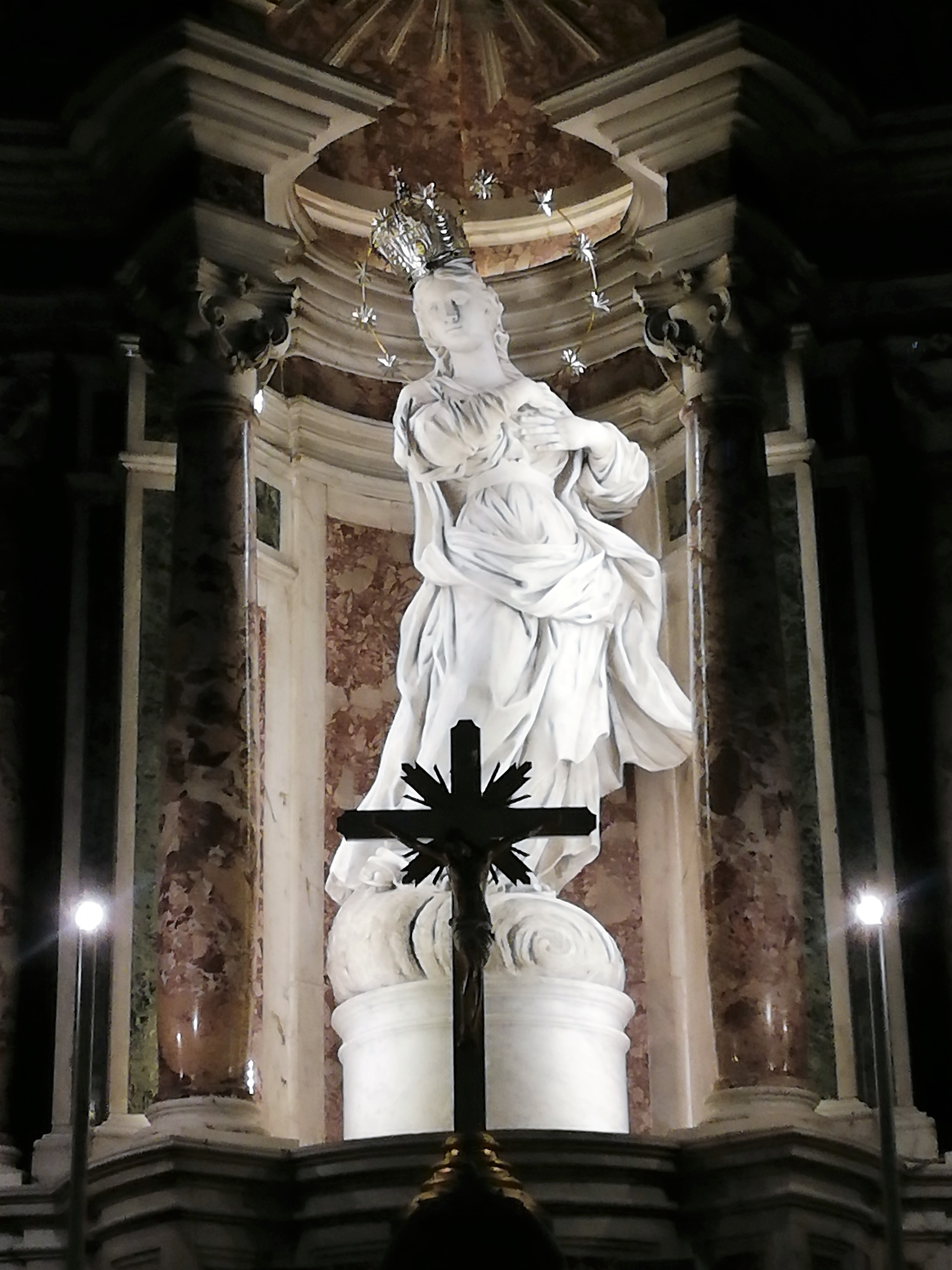
Marble statue of a crowned Santa Agata

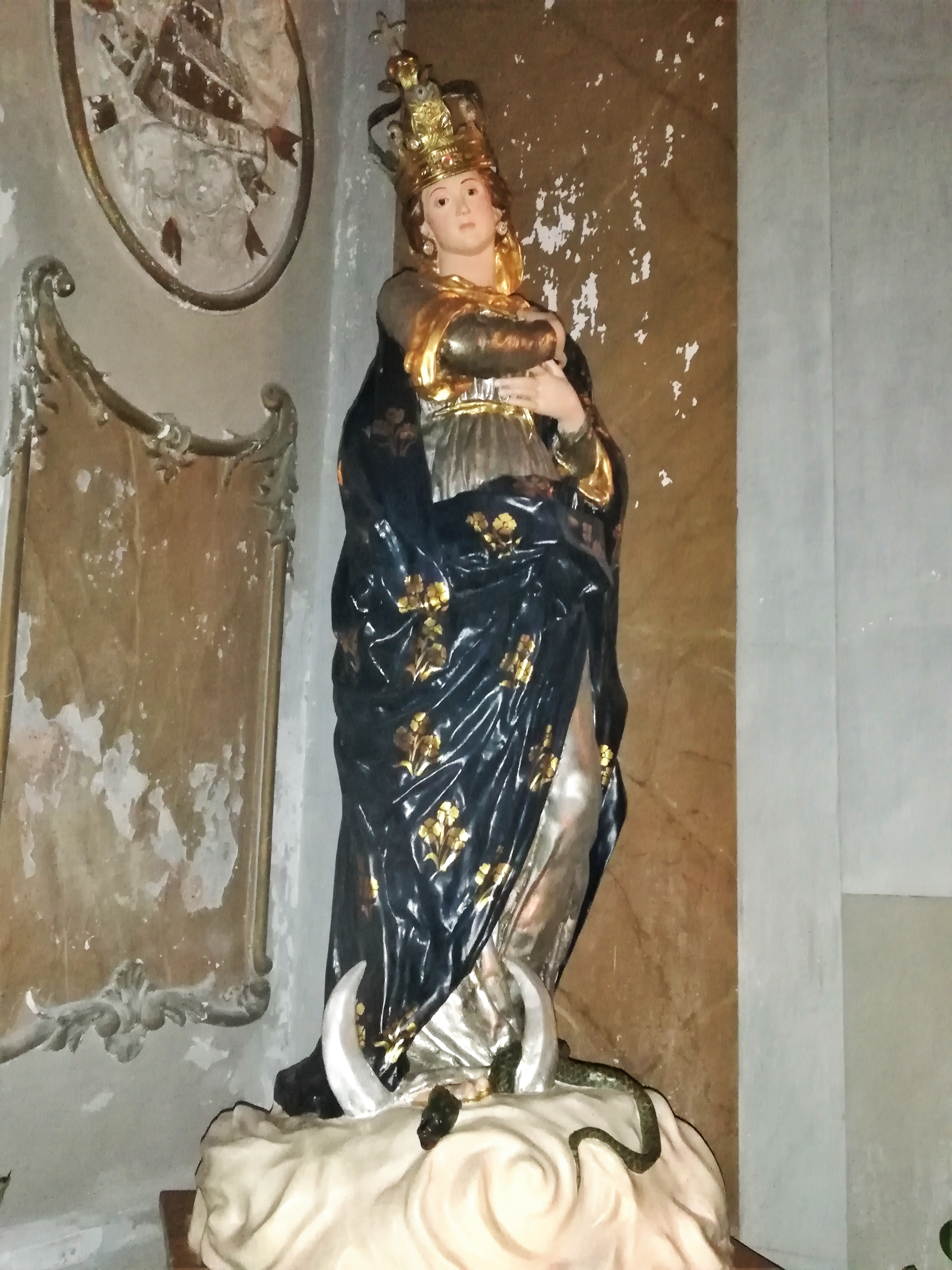
Icon of Immaculate Conception

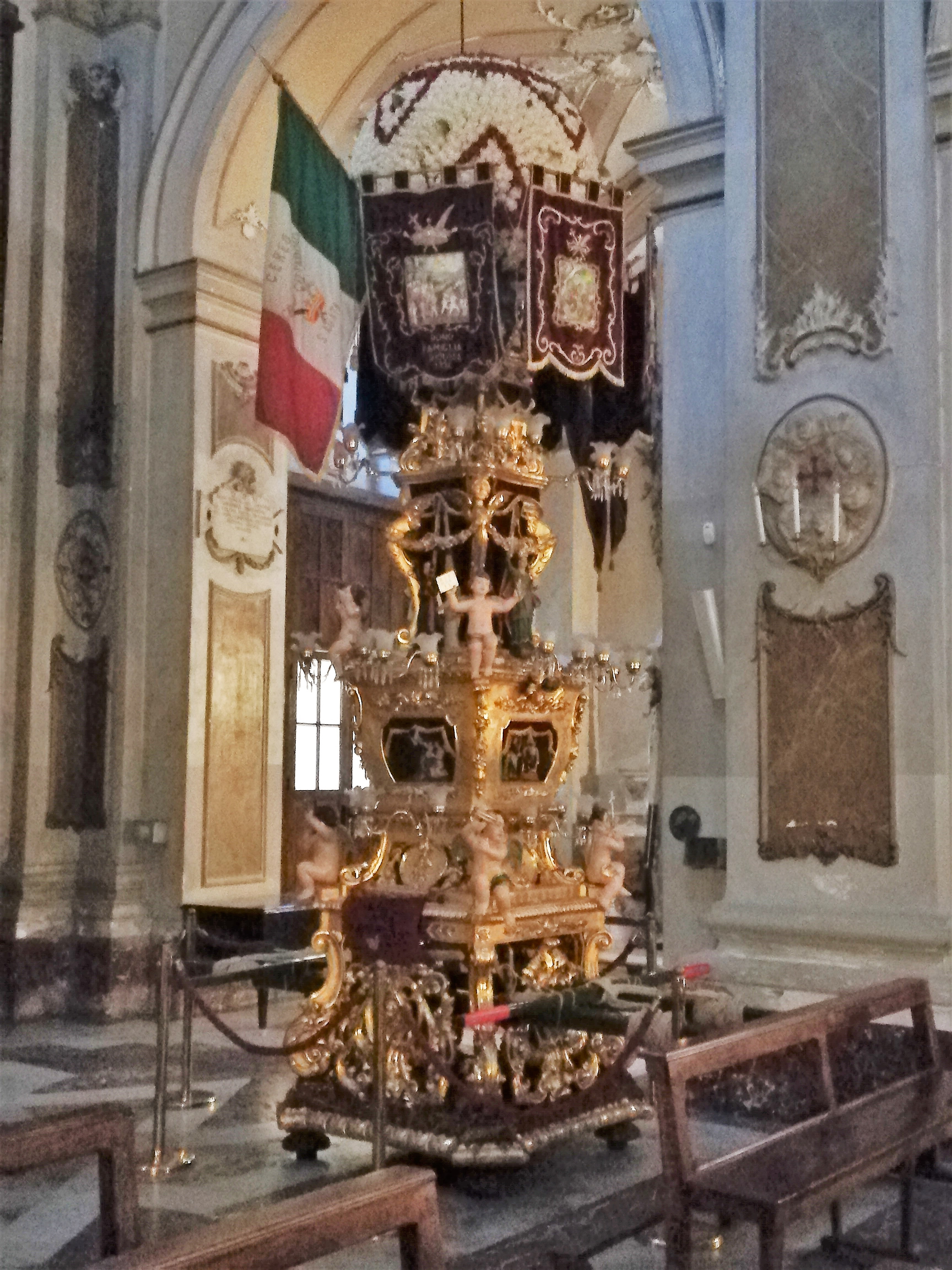
Candelora used during Festival of Sant'Agata procession

== Right Nave ==
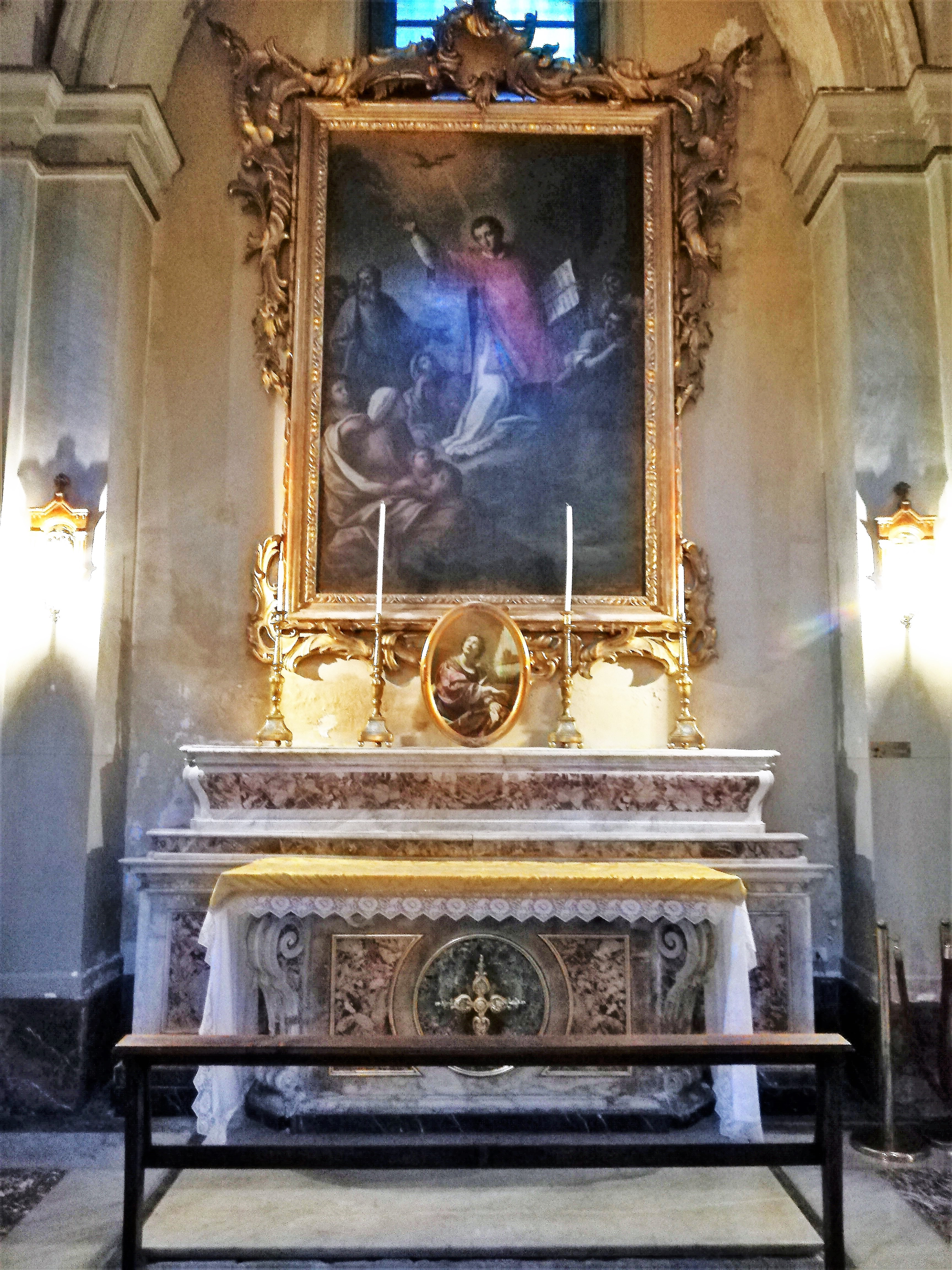
St Euplio by O. Sozzi

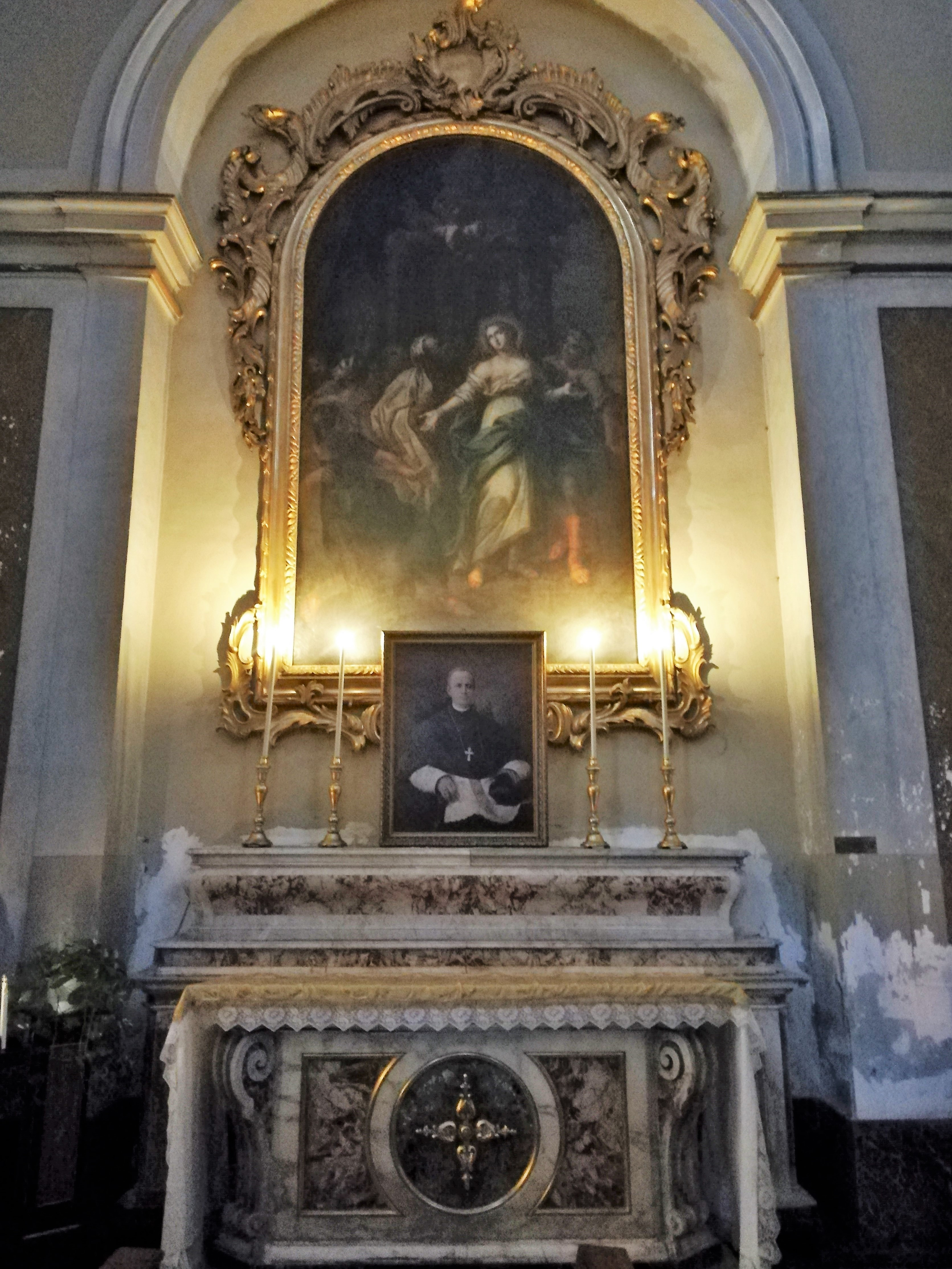
Martydom of Sant'Agata by Francesco Gramignani

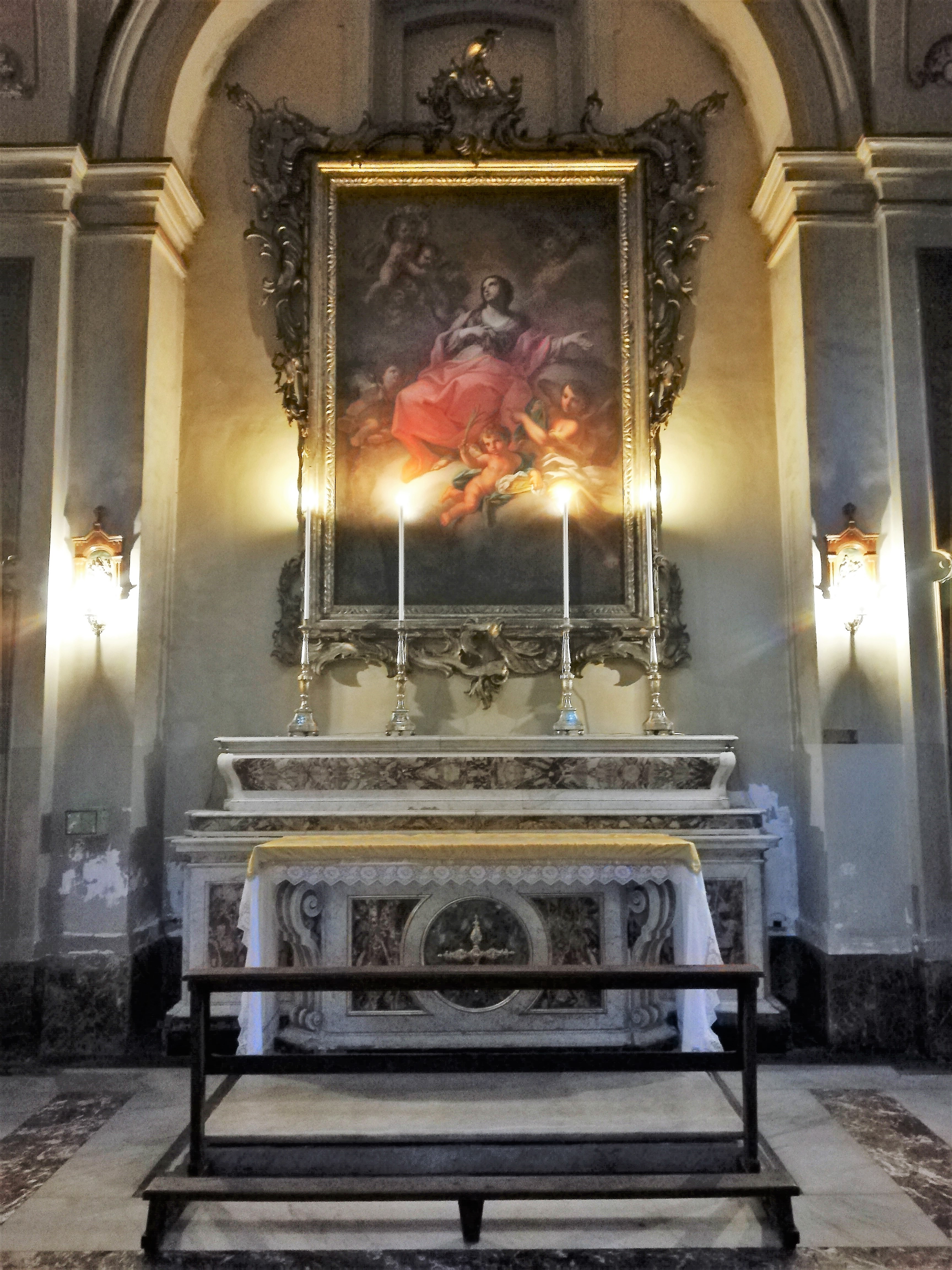
Glory of Santa Apollonia by O. Sozzi

== Left Nave ==
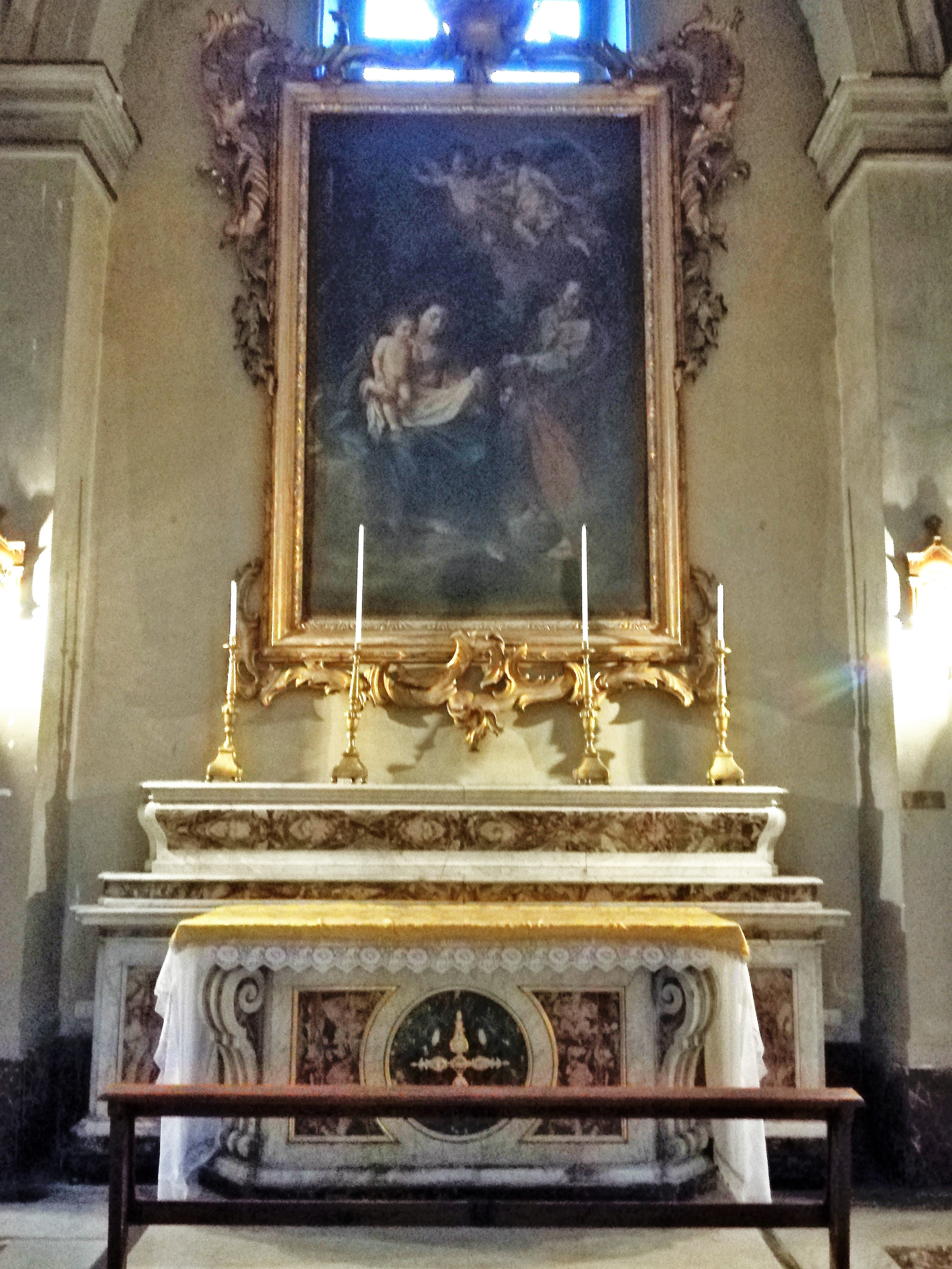
Holy Family (Flight to Egypt)

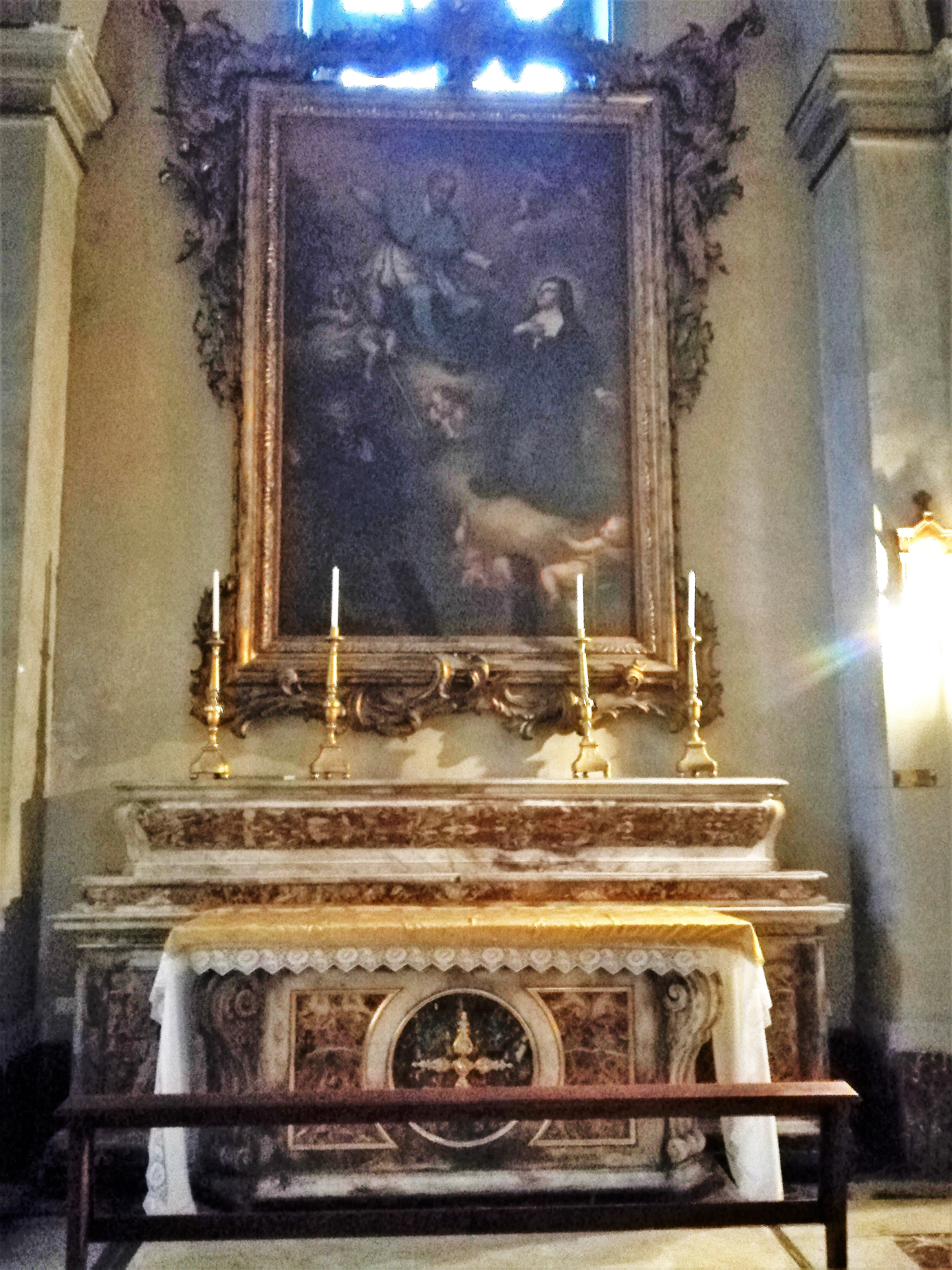
St Francis de Sales

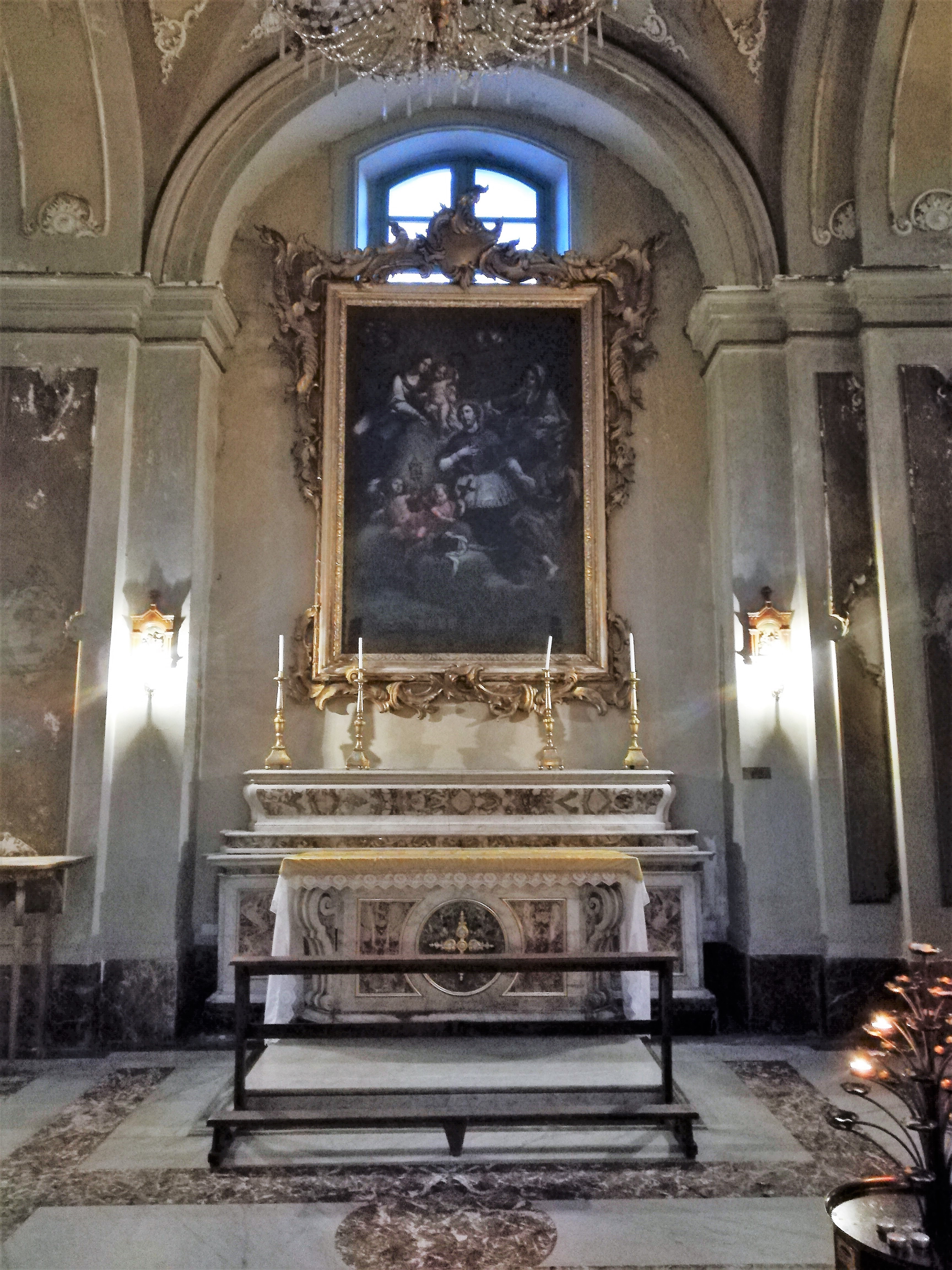
St John of Nepomuk

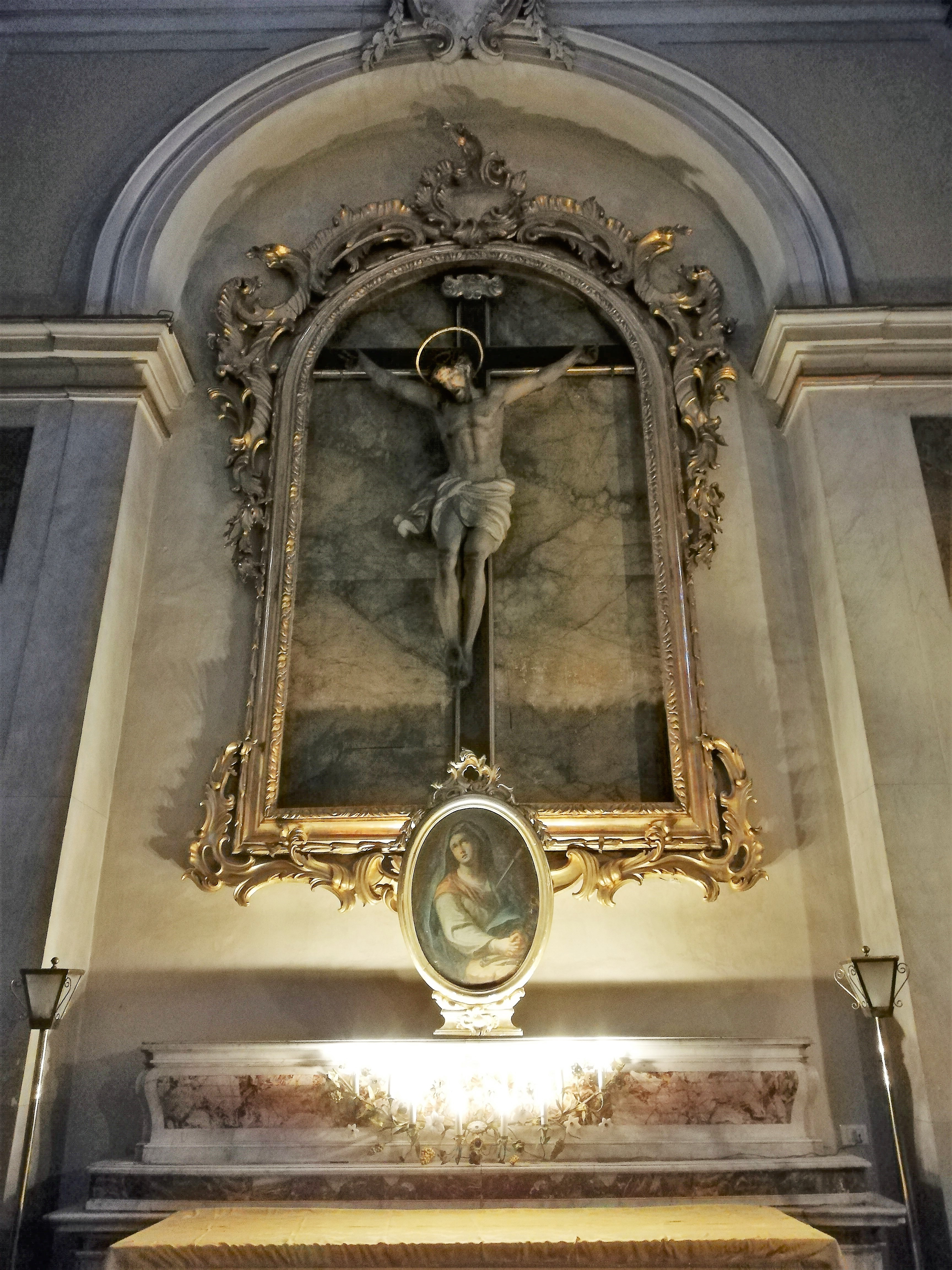
Crucifix

== Sources ==
- Rasà Napoli, Giuseppe (1984). Guida alle Chiese di Catania. Catania: Tringale Editore.
- Boscarino, Salvatore (1986). Sicilia barocca - Architettura e città 1610-1760. Rome: Officina Edizioni.
