= Santa Chiara, Catania =

Church in Catania, Italy

Coordinates: 37°30′05″N 15°05′00″E

Santa Chiara is a Roman Catholic church located on Via Garibaldi #100 in the center of the city of Catania, Region of Sicily, Italy. The monastery located behind the church presently houses a gallery of modern art.

== History and description ==
Nuns of the Clarissan order established themselves there in the 16th century, with a donation by Baron Antonio Paternò of his home and belongings, to which was added and endowment by Chiara Statella. The site was adapted into a convent in 1563, but nearly razed by the 1693 Sicily earthquake leading to reconstruction using designs by Giuseppe Palazzotto. The church and convent were completed by 1760.

The three-story facade of the church on Via Garibaldi is small and unassuming. On the third floor a three arch loggia allowed the nuns to observe the yearly Procession of Sant'Agata which departed from Sant'Agata alla Fornace to the Cathedral of Catania. The interiors are more elaborate, with floors decorated with polychrome marble, and a painted and gold-plated choir stall above the vestibule. There are five altarpieces. The octagonal nave has a large ceiling fresco depicting the Triumph of the Clarissan Order (1766) by Olivio Sozzi.
