= Porta Garibaldi, Catania =

Triumphal arch in Sicily, Italy

Coordinates: 37°29′59″N 15°04′26″E

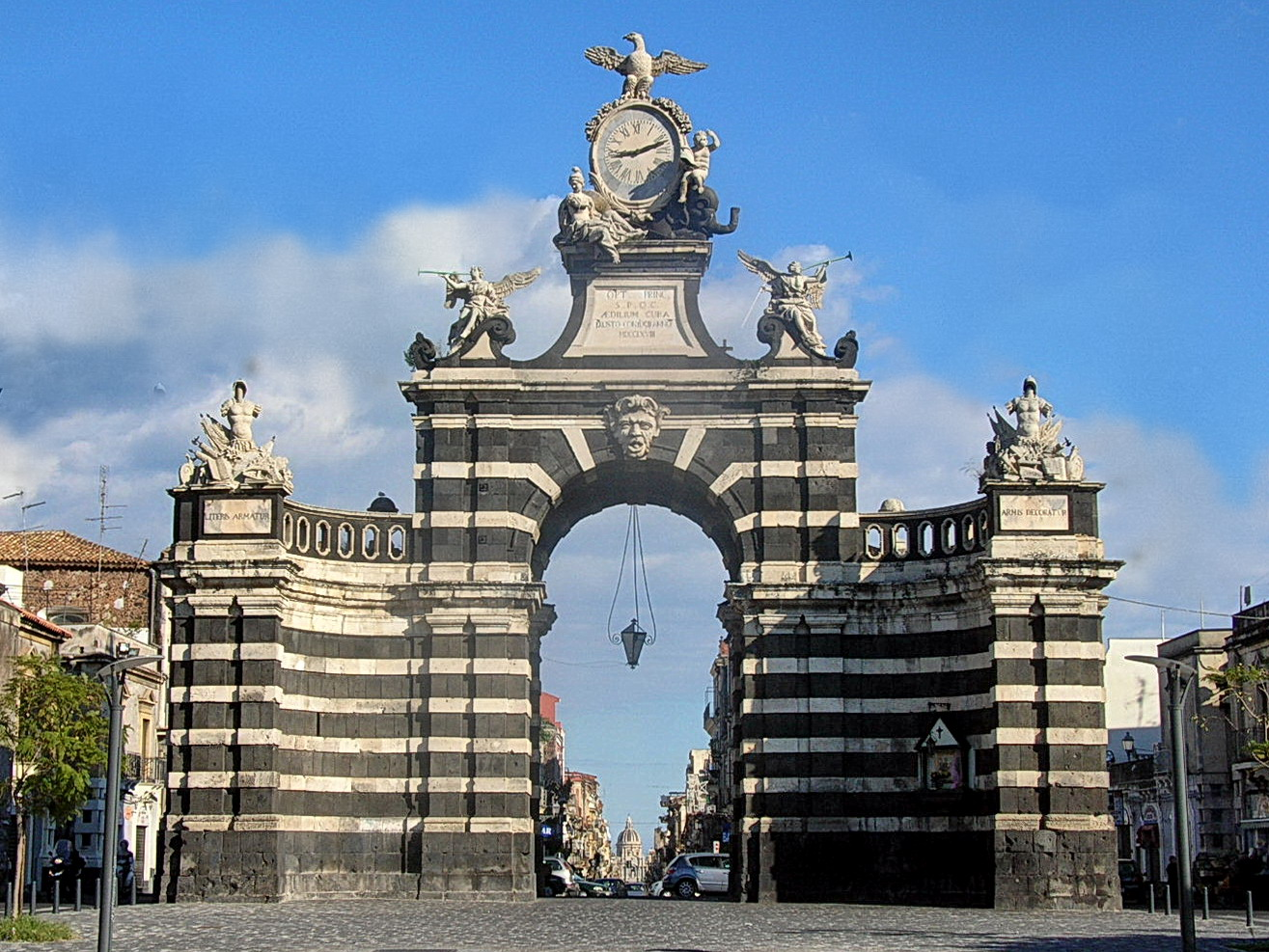
West (outer) side of Arch

The Porta Garibaldi, originally built as the Porta Ferdinandea or Porta Ferdinanda, is a triumphal arch, built in 1768, located at the end of Via Giuseppe Garibaldi, between the Piazza Palestro and Piazza Crocifisso in the quartiere Fortino of Catania, region of Sicily, Italy. It was built to celebrate the marriage of the Bourbon king Ferdinand I of the Two Sicilies to the Austrian princess Maria Carolina d'Asburgo-Lorena.

The architects of the monument were Francesco Battaglia and Stefano Ittar. The monument is made of alternating white stone from Siracusa and local dark lava blocks. At the top center of the arch is now a clock, surrounded by allegorical symbols, including an eagle and a statue recalling the black elephant (u Liotru), symbol of Catania. Originally, instead of a clock, was a marble bust of the Bourbon king. Flanking this tympanum, at the second level are two angels with trumpets. Flanking these are two sculptural depictions of Trophy of arms. Underneath these displays of weapons and armor are written two phrases: one says Litteris armatur (armed with letters) and the other Armis decoratur (decorated with arms). On the east side the tympanum shield depicts a phoenix rising with a Latin cartouche stating Melior de cinere surgo (Better I arise from the ashes), which aptly applies to Catania, that has often required rebuilding due to volcanic activity and earthquakes.
