= Yoshiko Watanabe =

Japanese artist, illustrator and animator

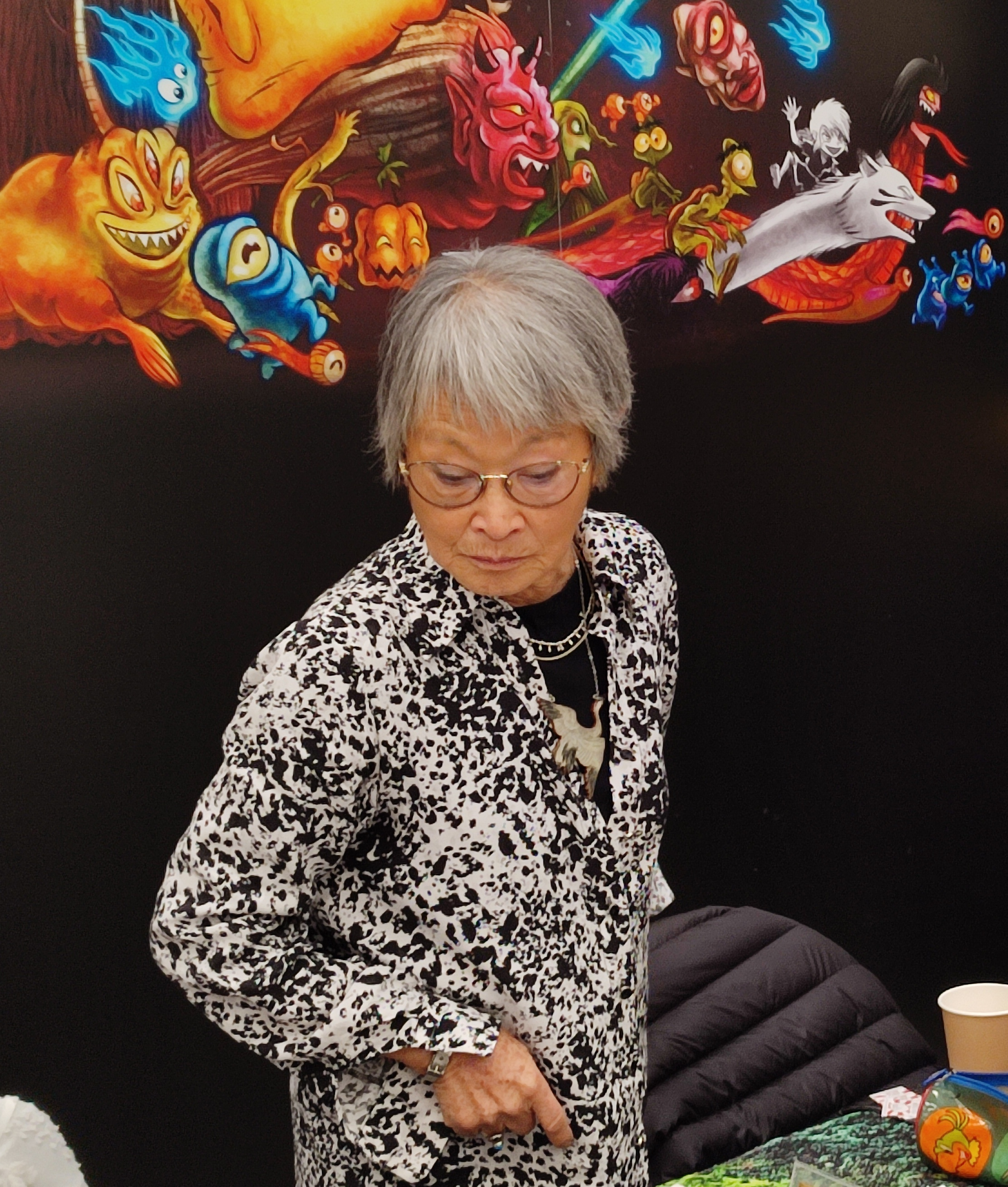
Yoshiko Watanabe in 2026

Yoshiko Watanabe (渡辺佳子, Yoshiko Watanabe; born in Qingdao) is a Japanese manga artist, Illustrator and animator.

== Biography ==
After a degree in theatre screenplay from Musashino University, she worked from 1963 to 1972 in Mushi Production with Osamu Tezuka for the creation of Astroboy, Kimba the White Lion, Princess Knight, Rocky Joe, and Bem. Transferred in Italy from 1973, she worked as mankata for Disney comics in Italy on Mademoiselle Anne, Galaxy Express 999 and others. She worked for long length animation movies, La Gabbianella e il Gatto, La Freccia Azzurra, Johan Padan, Aida degli Alberi and some TV productions like il Corsaro Nero. Illustrator for children fables, she published three works: La storia di Sayo (2009), Sute, il Figlio degli Spiriti (2011) and Donran (2012).

== Bibliography ==
- Takao, Yaguchi (1989). Boku no Tezuka Osamu (in Japanese). Tokyo: Kodansha.
