= Scroll (art) =

Form of decoration dominated by spiralling scrolls

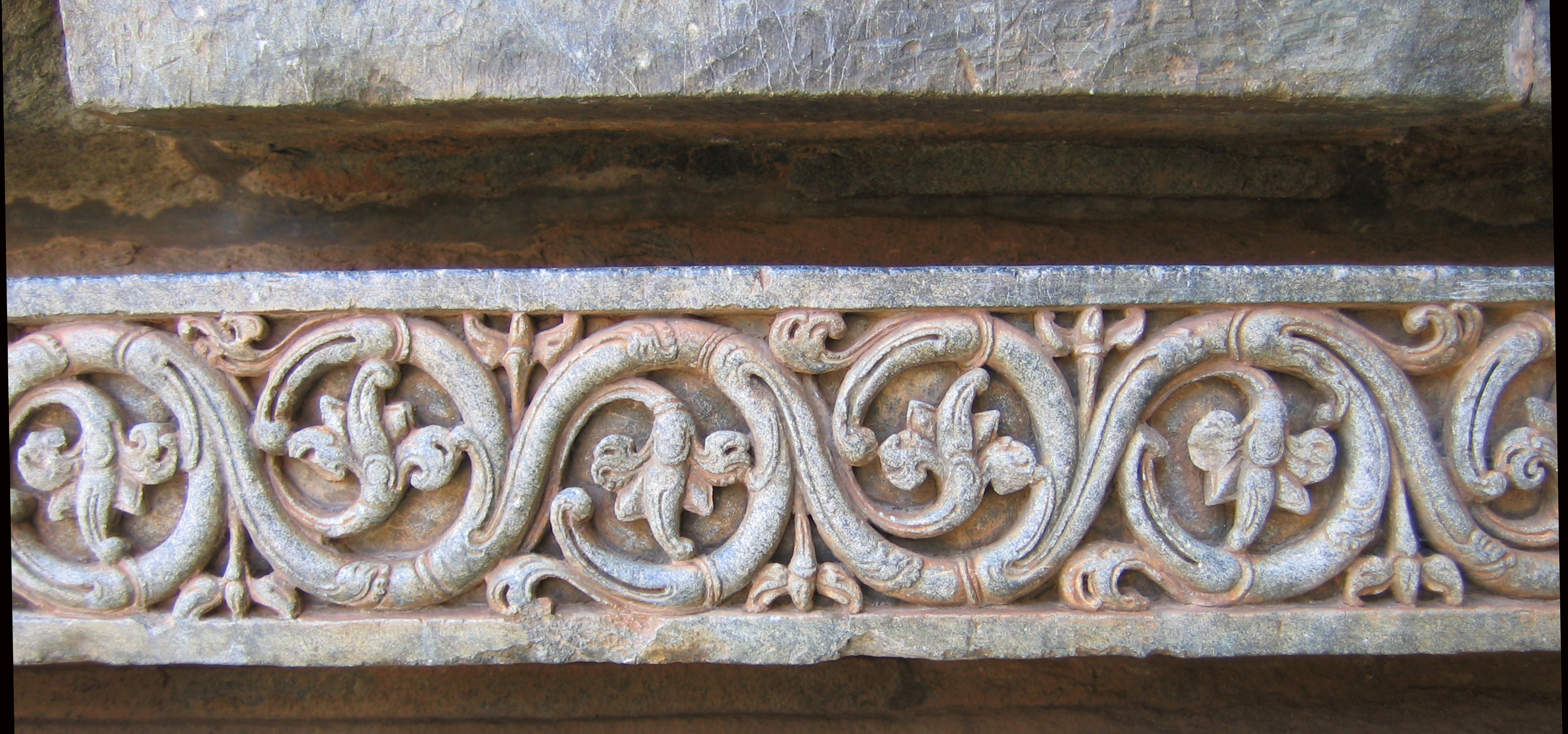
Band of running scroll decoration on the 12th-century Indian Hoysaleswara Temple

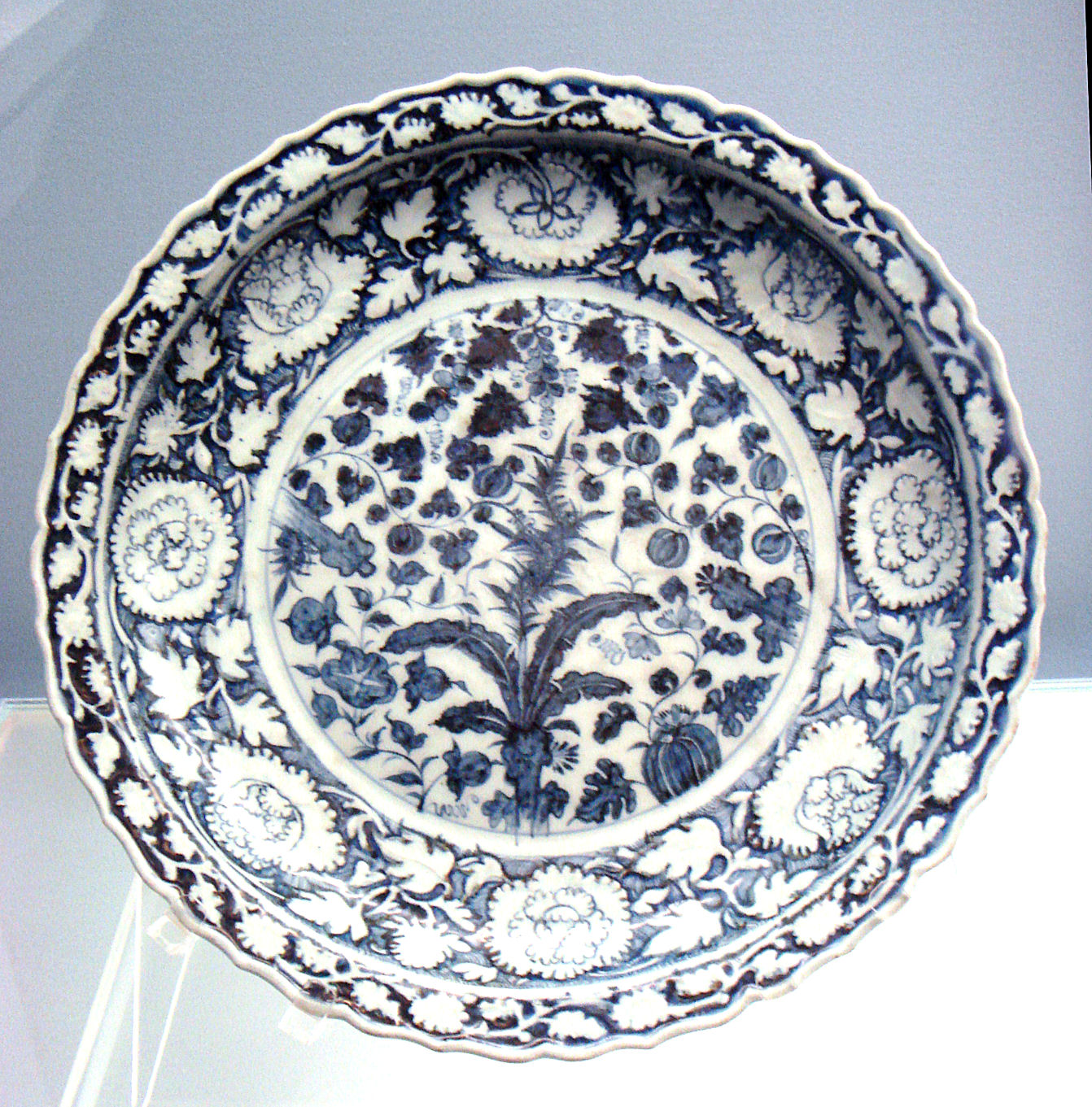
Chinese plate, Jingdezhen, 1271–1368, with three zones of scrolls with flowers

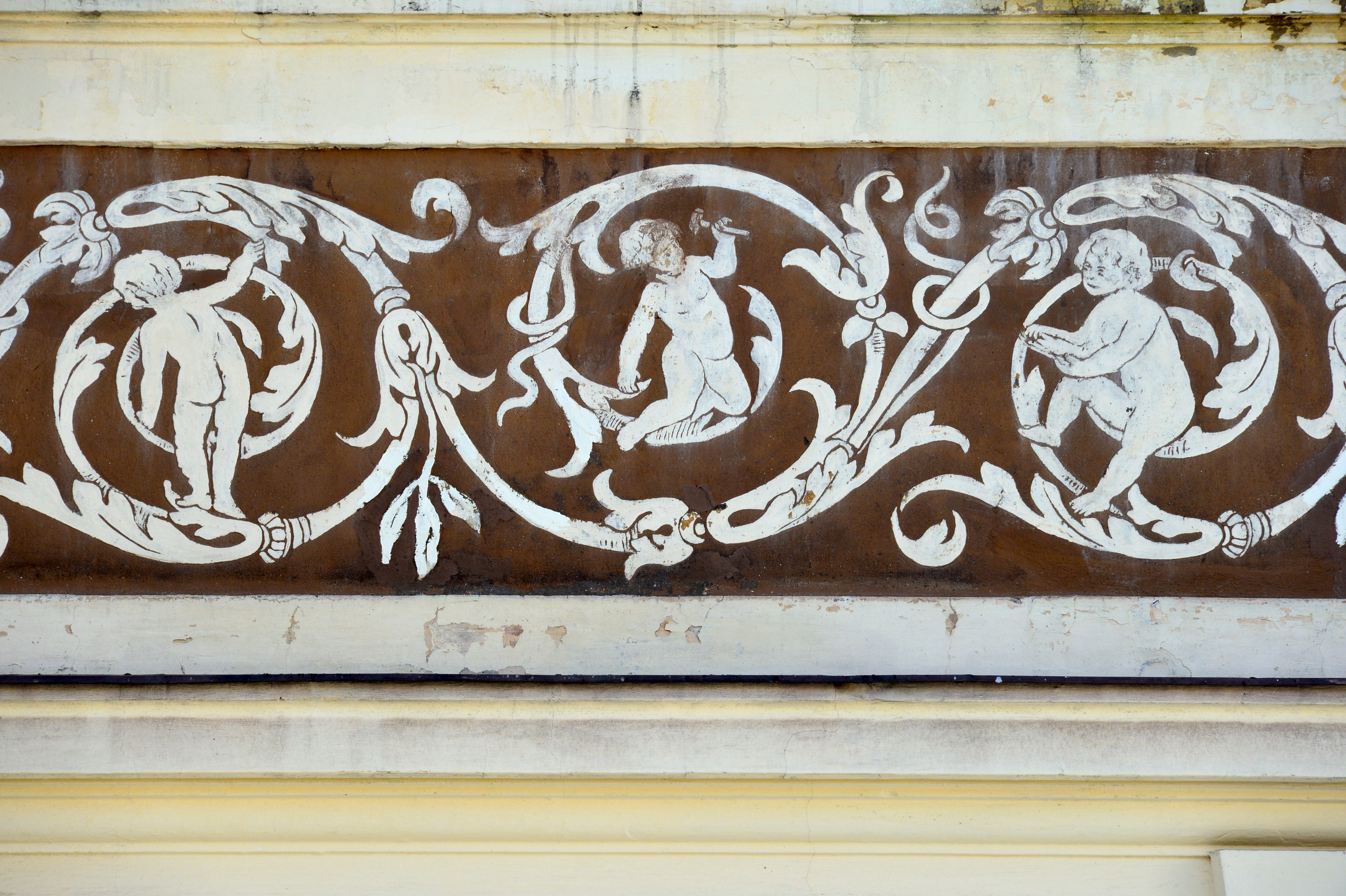
Austrian inhabited scroll frieze, 1890s

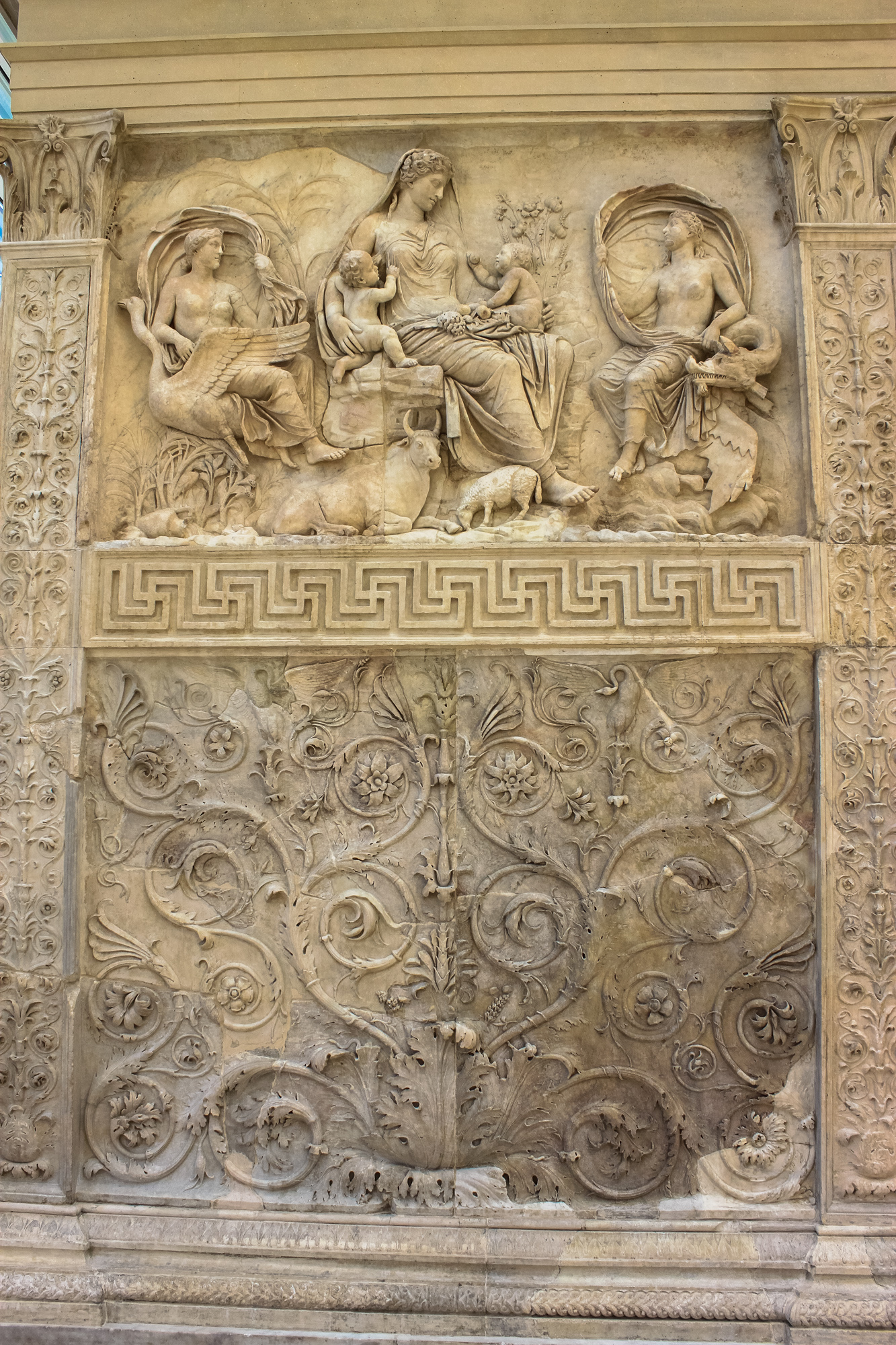
The "Tellus Panel" from the Ara Pacis, Rome, c. 27 AD. A spreading scrollwork panel below, scrolling forms coming off a straight stem in the side panels, and a border band of meanders below the figures.

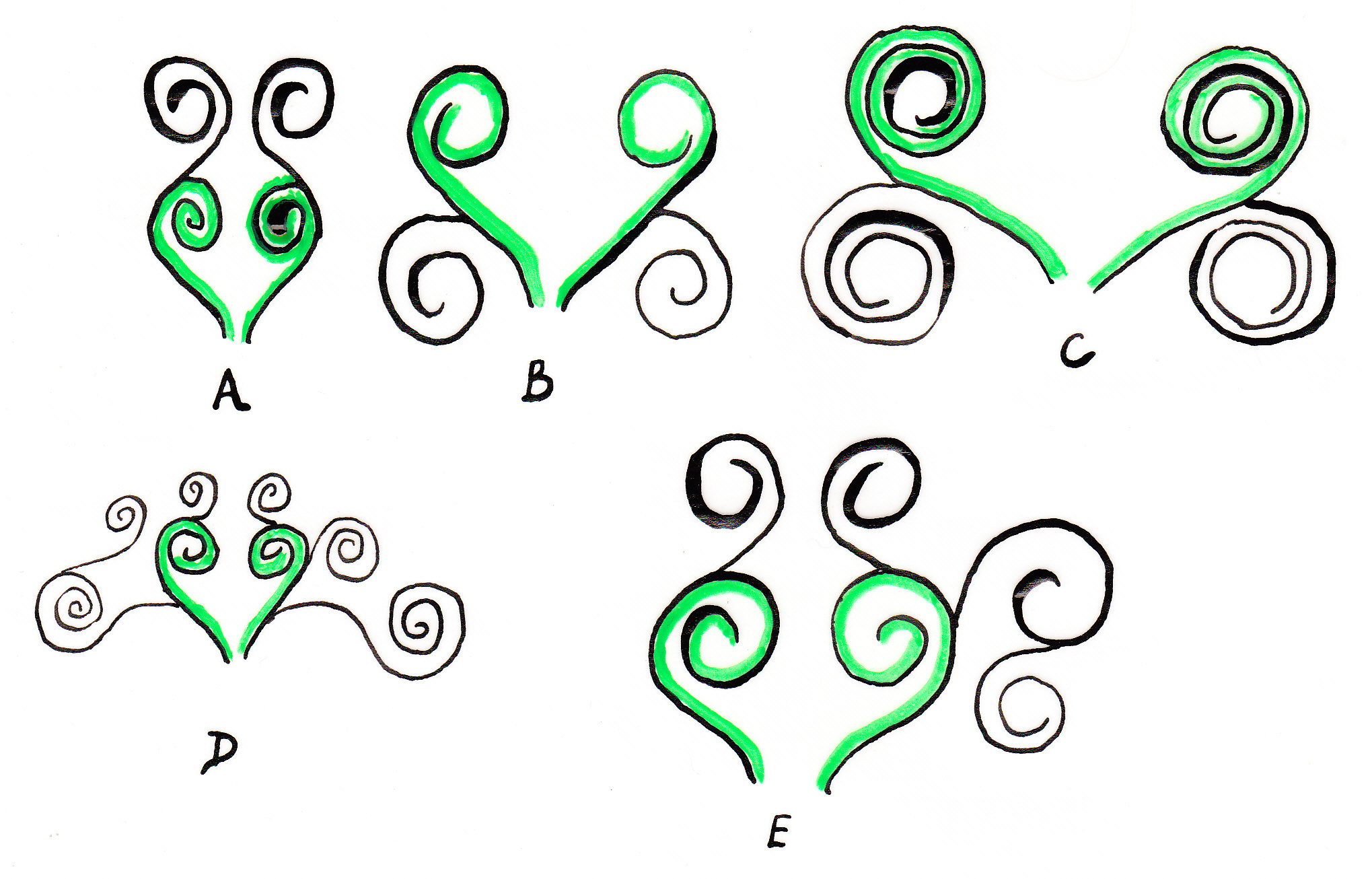
Examples of one basic form of the scroll, taken from existing monuments. Note the common core element of the heart-shaped confronted volutes & stem, highlighted in green. Key: *E: Ara Pacis, sculpture, c. 27 AD *B: Palazzo Mattei, Rome, stucco relief, 2nd century *D: Lateran, Rome, SS. Rufinus & Secundus, mosaic, 4th century *A: Dome of the Rock, Jerusalem, mosaic, 691-2 *C: San Clemente, Rome, mosaic, c. 1200

The scroll in art is an element of ornament and graphic design featuring spirals and rolling incomplete circle motifs, some of which resemble the edge-on view of a book or document in scroll form, though many types are plant-scrolls, which loosely represent plant forms such as vines, with leaves or flowers attached. Scrollwork is a term for some forms of decoration dominated by spiralling scrolls, today used in popular language for two-dimensional decorative flourishes and arabesques of all kinds, especially those with circular or spiralling shapes.

Scroll decoration has been used for the decoration of a vast range of objects, in all Eurasian cultures, and most beyond. A lengthy evolution over the last two millennia has taken forms of plant-based scroll decoration from Greco-Roman architecture to Chinese pottery, and then back across Eurasia to Europe. They are very widespread in architectural decoration, woodcarving, painted ceramics, mosaic, and illuminated manuscripts (mostly for borders).

In the usual artistic convention, scrolls "apparently do not succumb to gravitational forces, as garlands and festoons do, or oppose them, in the manner of vertically growing trees. This gives scrolls a relentless power. Even if attached to walls, they are more deeply embedded in the architectural order than the festoon, which are fictitiously hanging on them."

== Terminology ==
Typically in true scrolls the main "stem" lines do not cross over each other, or not significantly. When crossing stems become a dominant feature in the design, terms such as interlace or arabesque are used instead. Many scrolls run along a relatively narrow band, such as a frieze panel or the border of a carpet or piece of textile or ceramics, and so are often called "running scrolls", while others spread to cover wide areas, and are often infinitely expandible. Similar motifs made up of straight lines and right angles, such as the "Greek key", are more often called meanders.

In art history, a "floriated" or "flower scroll" has flowers, often in the centre of the volutes, and a "foliated" or "leaf scroll" shows leaves in varying degrees of profusion along the stems. The Ara Pacis scrolls are foliated and sparingly floriated, whilst those in the Dome of the Rock mosaics are profusely foliated with thick leaves forming segments of the stems. As in arabesques, the "leaf" forms often spring directly from the stem without a leaf stalk in ways that few if any real plants do; these are generally derived from the ancient half-palmette motif, with the stem running along the bisected edge of the palmette. Although forms are often based on real plants, especially the acanthus, vine, lotus and paeony, faithful representation is rarely the point of the design, as of these four only the vine is actually the sort of climbing plant with many stems and tendrils that scrolls generally represent. Later Islamic and Chinese scroll decoration often included more flowers than European designs, whether classical or medieval (see below).

Scroll-forms containing animals or human figures are said to be "inhabited"; more often than not the figures are wildly out of scale with the plant forms. Frequently, especially in spreading designs, an upright element imitating the main stem or flower-stalk of the plant appears as a central element protruding vertically from the base, again as in the Ara Pacis panel. This may be termed a "standard" but is not a necessary element; it gives the design a top and bottom, which may be appropriate for architecture or furniture, but many designs on textiles and pottery are intended to have no main orientation for the viewer. The standard was frequently depicted as a fanciful candelabra in grotesque designs, in which it is an important element, central to the composition.

Scrollwork in its strict meaning is rather different; the scroll is imagined as the curling end of a strip or sheet of some flat and wide material. It develops from strapwork, as the ends of otherwise flat elements, loosely imitating leather, metal sheets, or broad leaves rather than plant tendrils. Rather than the "profile" view displaying the spiral, the forms are often shown front on with the width of the strip seen. It begins in the Renaissance, and becomes increasingly popular in Mannerist and Baroque ornament.

== History ==
Continuous scroll decoration has a very long history, and such patterns were an essential element of classical and medieval decoration. The use of scrolls in ornament goes back to at least the Bronze Age; geometric scroll ornament has been found in the Palace of Knossos at Minoan Crete dating to approximately 1800 BC, perhaps drawing from even earlier Egyptian styles; there were also early examples in Mesopotamia. Geometrical scroll patterns like the Vitruvian scroll are found very widely in many cultures, and probably often developed independently.

Plant-based scrolls were very widely used in Greek and Roman architectural decoration, spreading from them to other types of objects. They may have first evolved in Greek painted pottery, where their development can traced in the large surviving corpus. In Europe Greco-Roman decoration, probably especially as seen in jewellery and floor mosaics, was adapted by the "barbarian" peoples of the Migration Period into interlace styles, often replacing the plant forms of the main scrolling stem with stretched and stylized animal forms. In Insular art the earlier interlace designs were partly replaced after Christianization by vine scrolls – a reference to John 15:1 "I am the true vine, and my Father is the gardener" – and medieval European decoration in general evolved styles that combined the two.

Another expansion was to the East: "The practice of decorating facades in Chinese Buddhist caves with figures combined with leaf scrolls was derived in its entirety from provincial forms of Hellenistic architecture employed in Central Asia"; they appear in China from the 5th century. The (Nelumbo nucifera) lotus flower was a symbol of Buddhism, and so very often included in these religious scroll designs from the 6th century on, which was to have a profound influence on Asian scroll designs, long after the religious significance had been largely or entirely forgotten, and in places where the actual lotus water plant was unknown.

It was several centuries before these designs were adapted by Chinese potters, via their earlier adoption in metalwork; indeed an isolated gilt-bronze cup with a vine scroll comes from the 5th-century Northern Wei, probably influenced by metalwork from the West, and more abstracted or geometrical scroll designs appear earlier in Chinese art. The paeony seems to have become very fashionable in China during the Tang dynasty, and often replaced the lotus flower. By the Yuan dynasty plant scroll designs became very important in painted pottery. In the Islamic world the external influences were initially mainly from their Byzantine and Sasanian predecessors, but later, especially after the Mongol conquests, from Chinese designs, especially in pottery, which themselves had developed from the original Buddhist importation to China.

Greco-Buddhist art, and direct luxury imports, brought scroll forms to India, for example to the great 1st century stupa at Amaravati in southern India, from where they spread to South-East Asia, with additional input from China. There they often became very abstracted in pottery. Japan was heavily influenced by China. From the late medieval period onwards Chinese and Indian scrolling styles, and their Islamic cousins, were imported to Europe on pottery and textiles, reaching a peak of influence in the 18th-century. In the Renaissance Europe had also revived interest in versions of its own classical styles that more strictly followed their originals.

== Common types ==
In one common spreading type for wide areas, the basic form of the arabesque is a heart shape formed from two confronted volutes on stems, shown highlighted in green in the illustration. To this core are added any number of further volutes, above, below or to the sides. It is thus a motif which can be infinitely expanded to cover a surface of any size, and indeed this function of decorating plain surfaces, as a form of diaper, is its chief use. From the illustration it is clear that the form present on the Ara Pacis (drawing E) erected in Imperial Rome during the time of Augustus, that is to say during the 1st quarter of the 1st century AD, is unchanged in substance when compared with the form in the apse mosaic of San Clemente al Laterano in Rome dated c. 1200 (drawing C). The basic form appears unaltered during the intervening centuries, and indeed continued in use through the Renaissance and to the present day.

In other types the heart-shaped core is omitted, the scroll taking the form of an "S" with voluted ends, generally seen in confronted pairs, as in the mosaics of the Treasury of the Great Mosque of Damascus, Byzantine work of the 7th century. This form is also encountered at the Treasury in Damascus, having a pair of volutes turned inwards towards the bowl. The form is generally used alone and does not sprout further volutes as generally does the core heart-shaped form.

== Applications ==
Scrollwork (in the popular definition) is most commonly associated with Baroque architecture, though it saw uses in almost every decorative application, including furniture, metalwork, porcelain and engraving. In Mannerism, strapwork forms often terminated in scrolls. Modern blacksmiths use scrolls in ornamental wrought-iron work gates and balustrades, and they have formed the basis of many wallpaper designs.

Applications of single scroll forms can be seen in the volutes at the head of an Ionic column, the carved scroll at the end of the pegbox on instruments in the violin family (resembling fiddleheads in nature), and the heads of many Western crosiers.

Scrollwork is a technique used in cake decorating. "Albeit a bit baroque, scrollwork lends a charmingly antique quality to the sides of a cake." Scrollwork in wood may be made using a scroll saw.

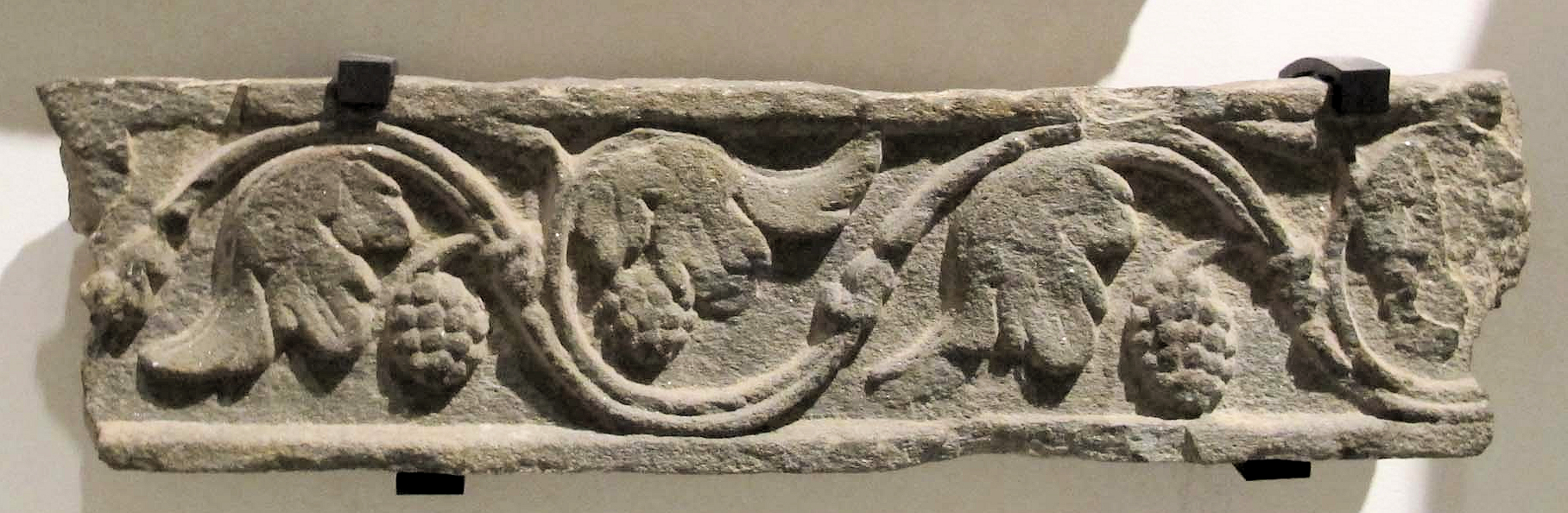
Gandhara floral scrolls from the Shotorak Monastery (Afghanistan), 2nd-3rd century AD, stone, Musée Guimet, Paris

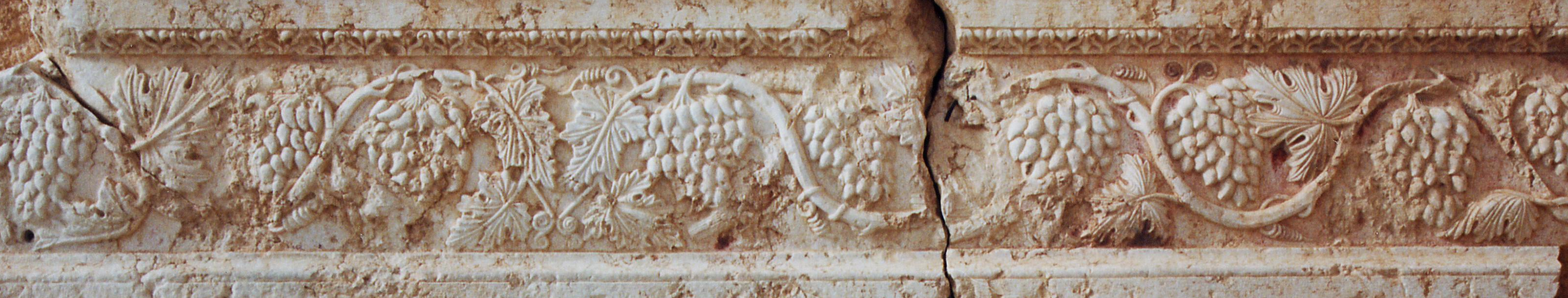
Roman grape scrolls of the Temple of Bel, Palmyra, Syria, unknown architect or sculptor, late 1st-first half of the 2nd century AD

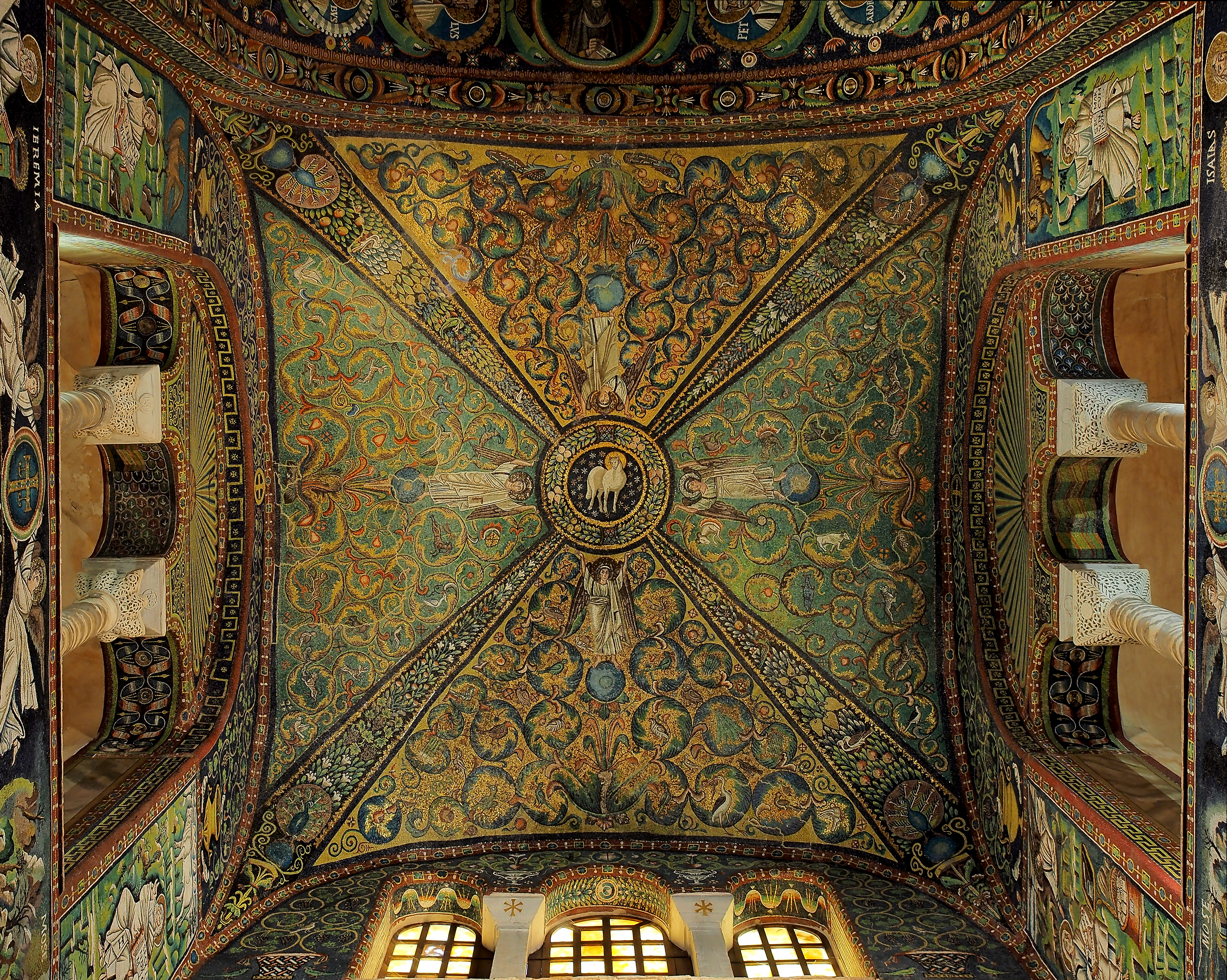
Byzantine scrolls on a ceiling of Basilica of San Vitale, Ravenna, unknown architect or craftsman, begun in c.532 and consecrated in 548

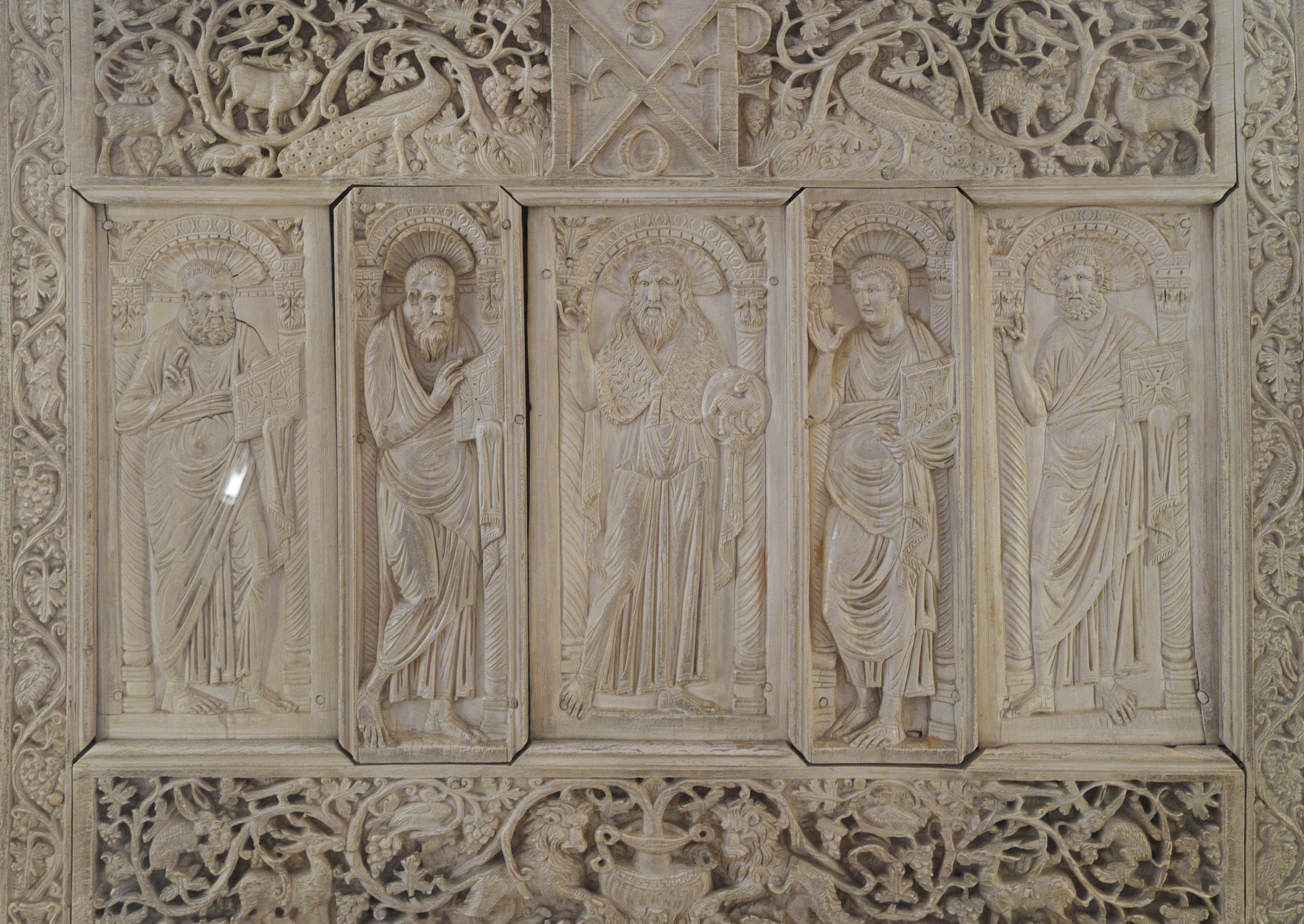
Byzantine scrolls with animals on the Throne of Archbishop Maximian of Ravenna, 546-556, ivory, Archiepiscopal Museum, Ravenna

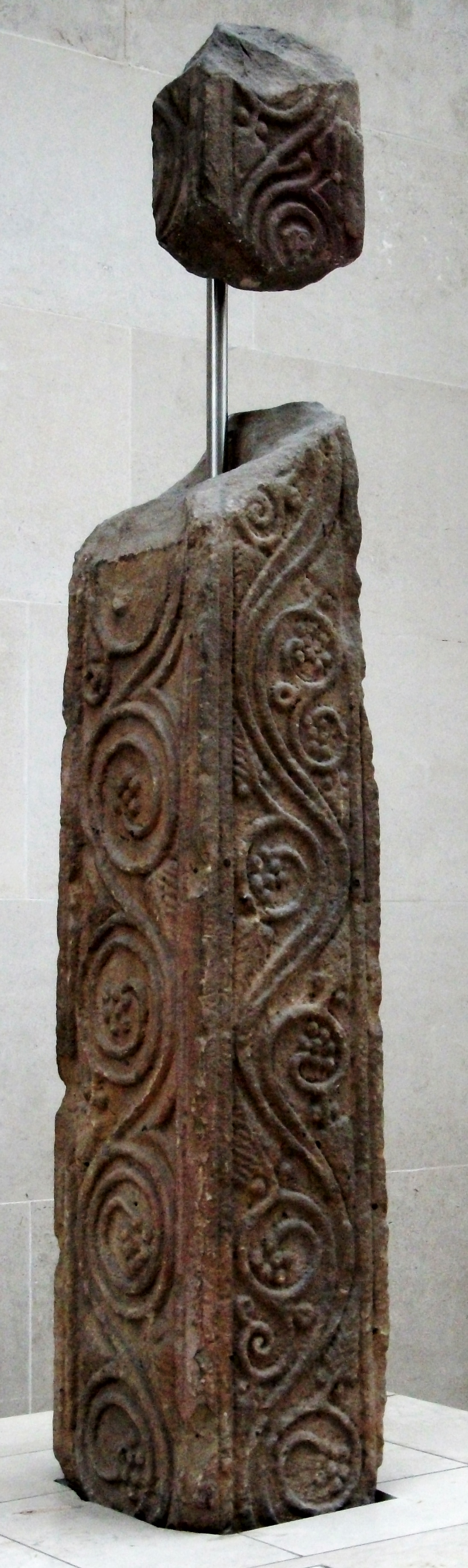
Anglo-Saxon monumental cross with vine scroll, 8th-9th centuries, stone, British Museum

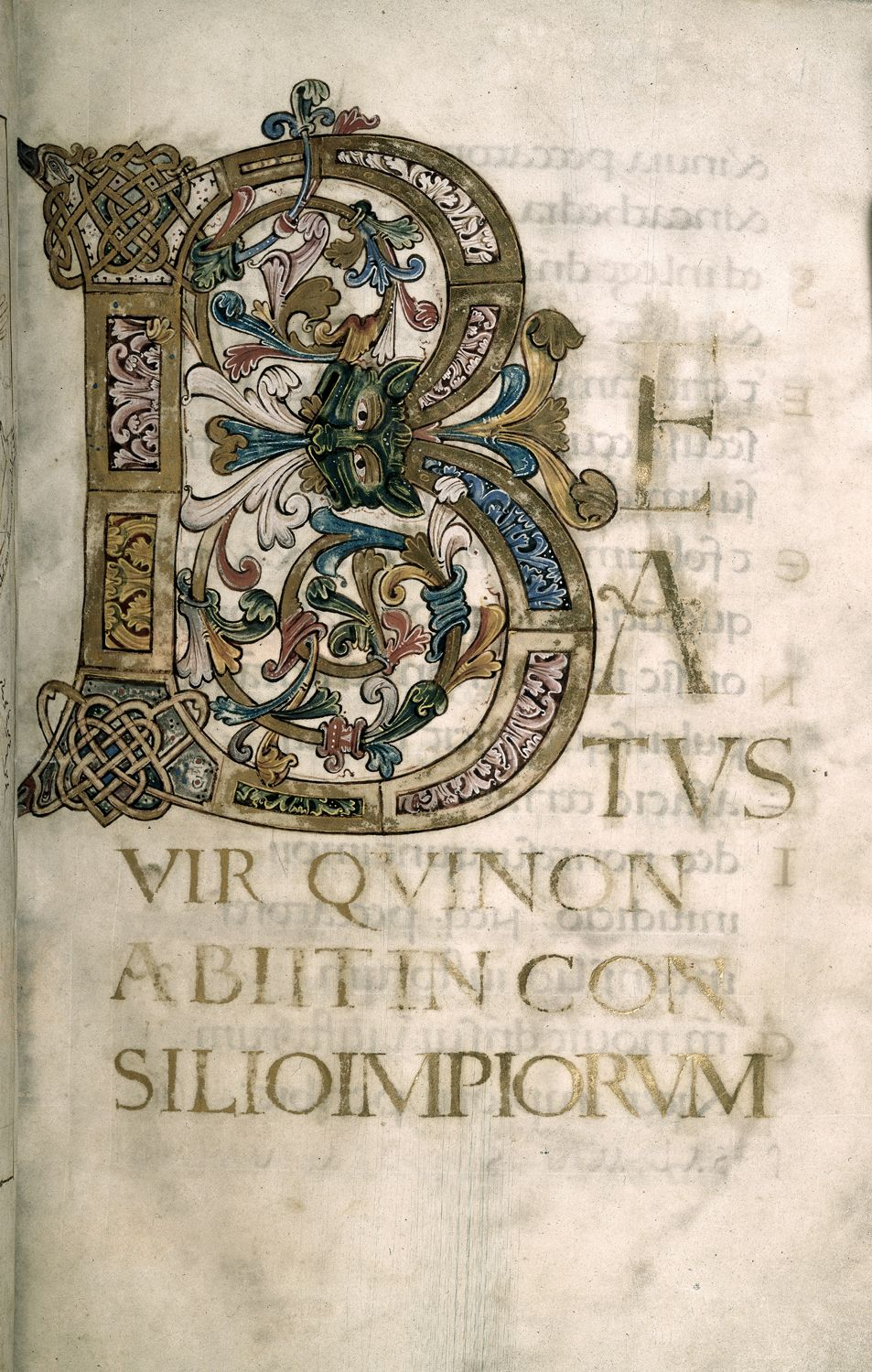
Late Anglo-Saxon scrolls in a Beatus initial, drawing on classical acanthus scrolls, via the Carolingian Renaissance, c.975-1000, illumination on parchment, British Library, London

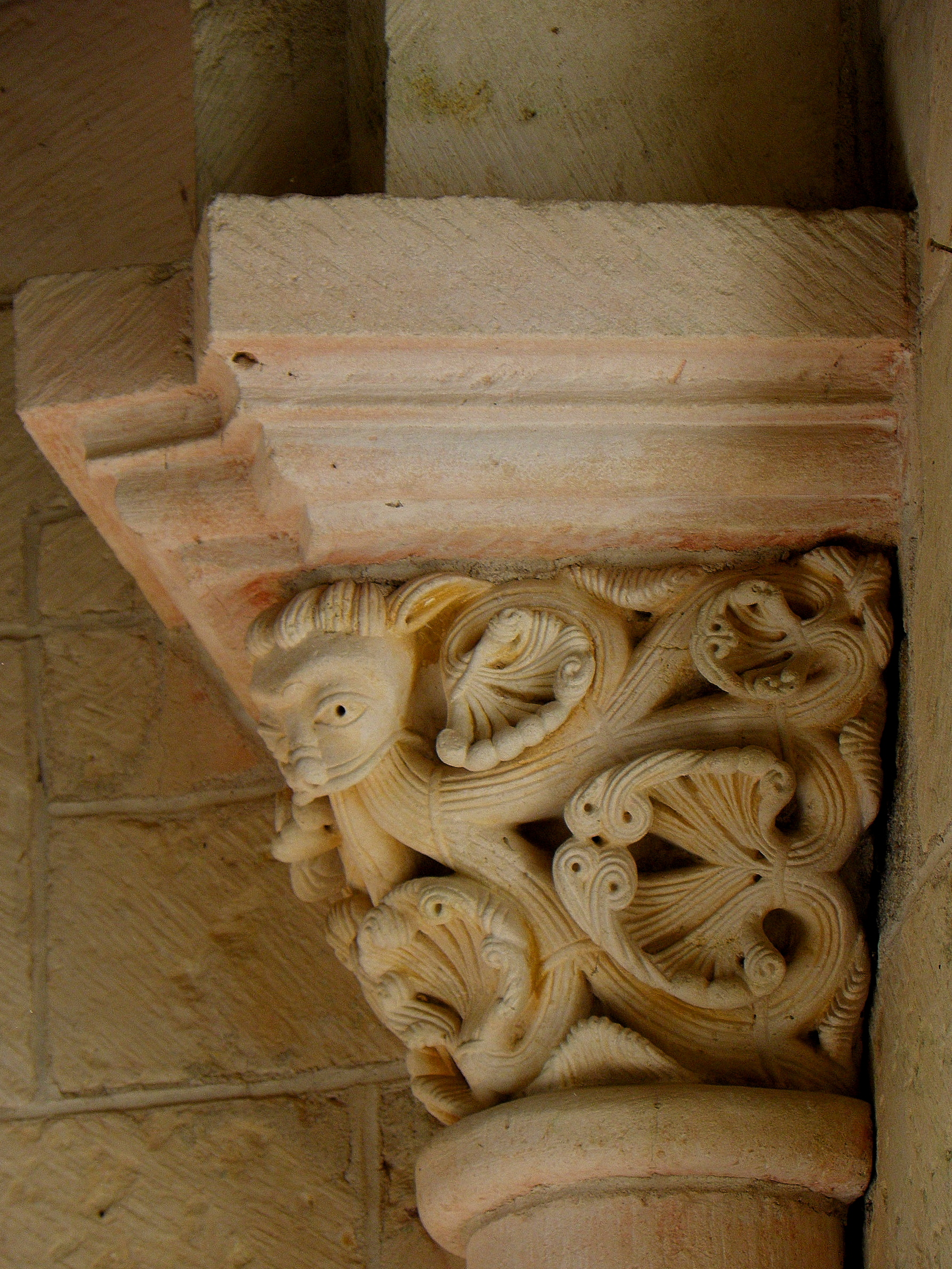
Romanesque scrollwork on a capital in the Église Saint-Laurent-et-Notre-Dame de Gargilesse-Dampierre, Gargilesse-Dampierre, France, unknown architect, 12th century

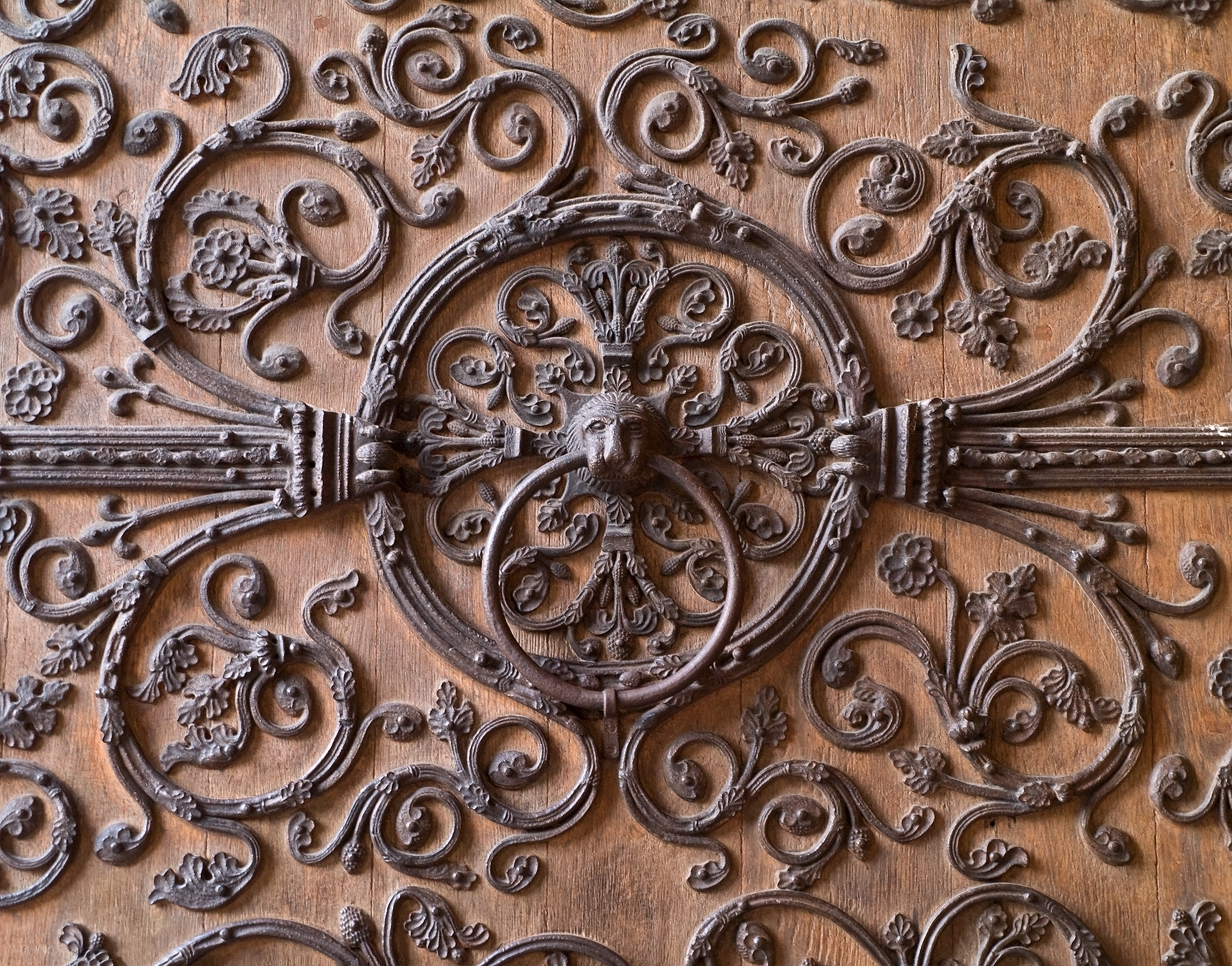
Gothic wrought-iron spreading scrolls with flowers on a door of Notre Dame de Paris, unknown architect or blacksmith, 12th or 13th centuries

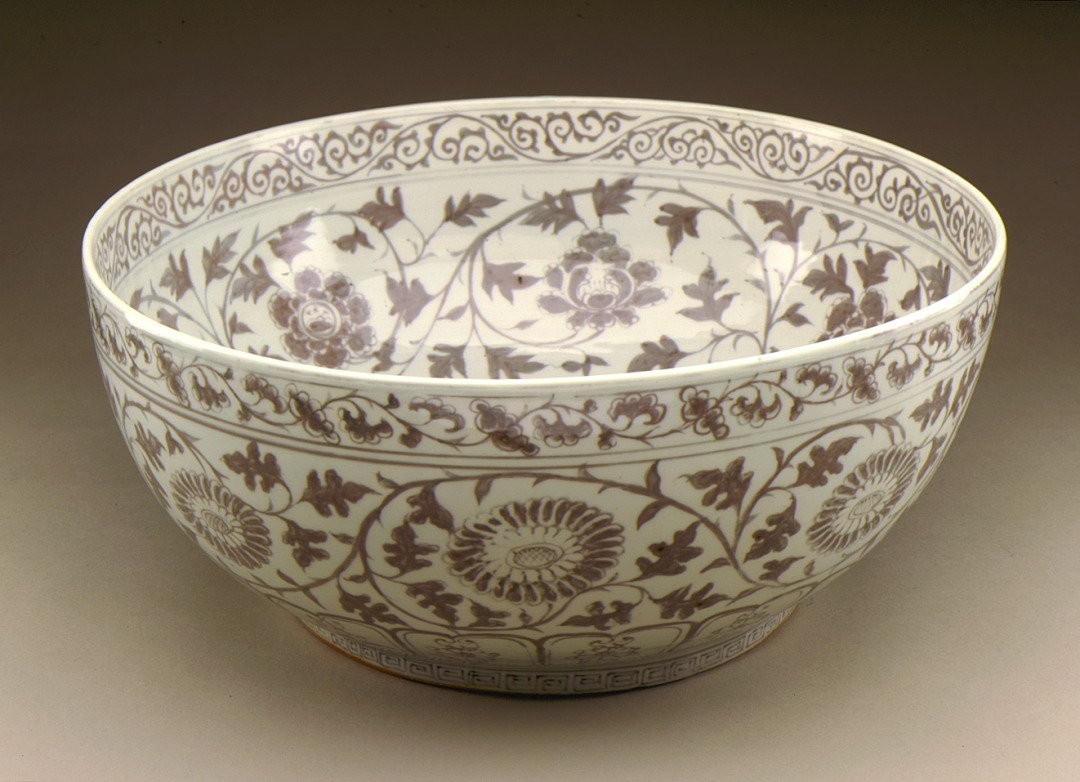
Chinese rinceau on a bowl, 1368-1450, porcelain, Los Angeles County Museum of Art, US

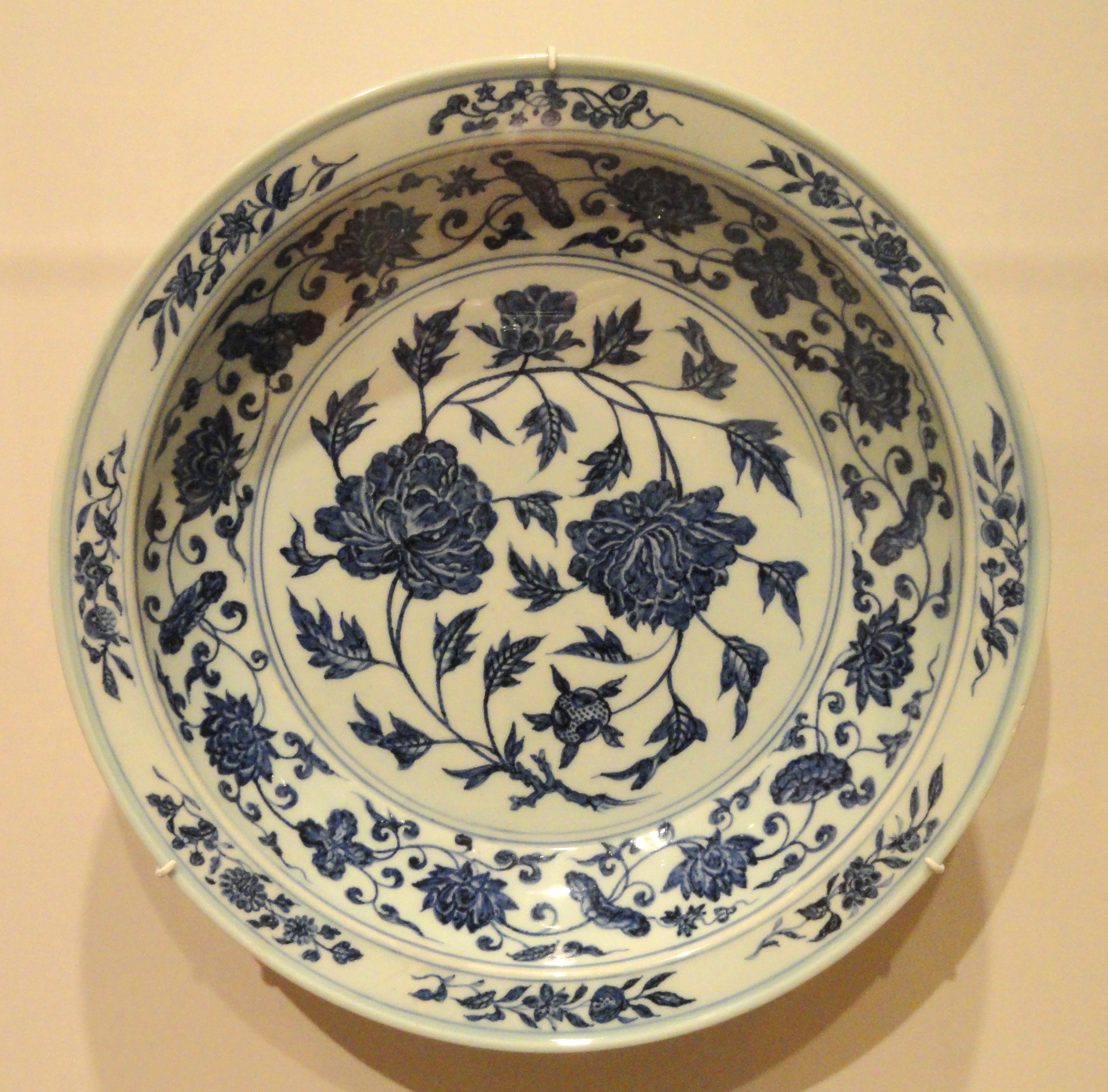
Chinese charger from Jiangxi, with blossoming peony decor, early 15th century, porcelain with underglaze cobalt blue, Sackler Museum, Harvard Art Museums, Cambridge, Massachusetts, US

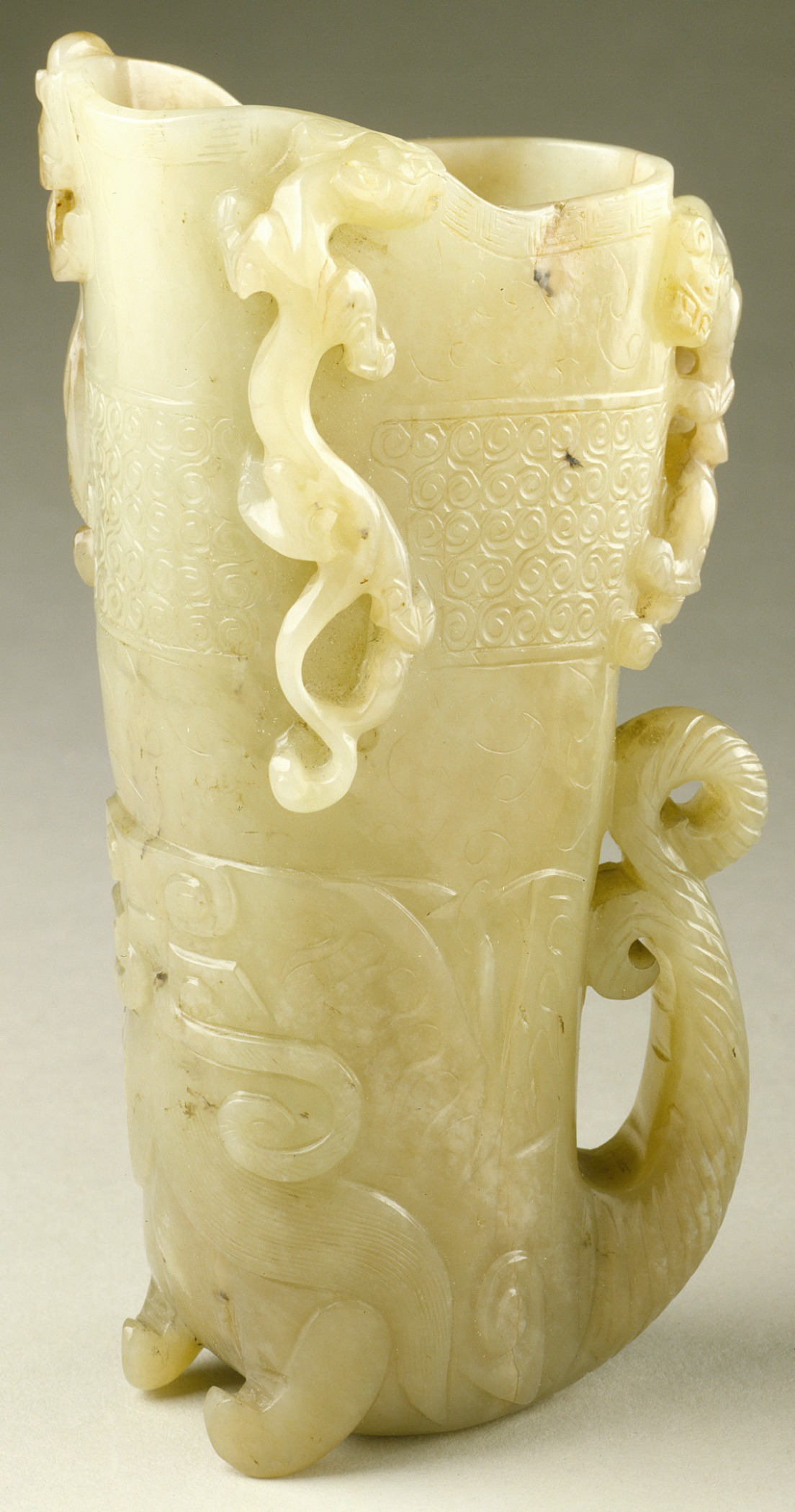
Cup (guang) in the form of a rhyton with dragons and scrollwork, c.1450-1644, abraded jade, Los Angeles County Museum of Art, US

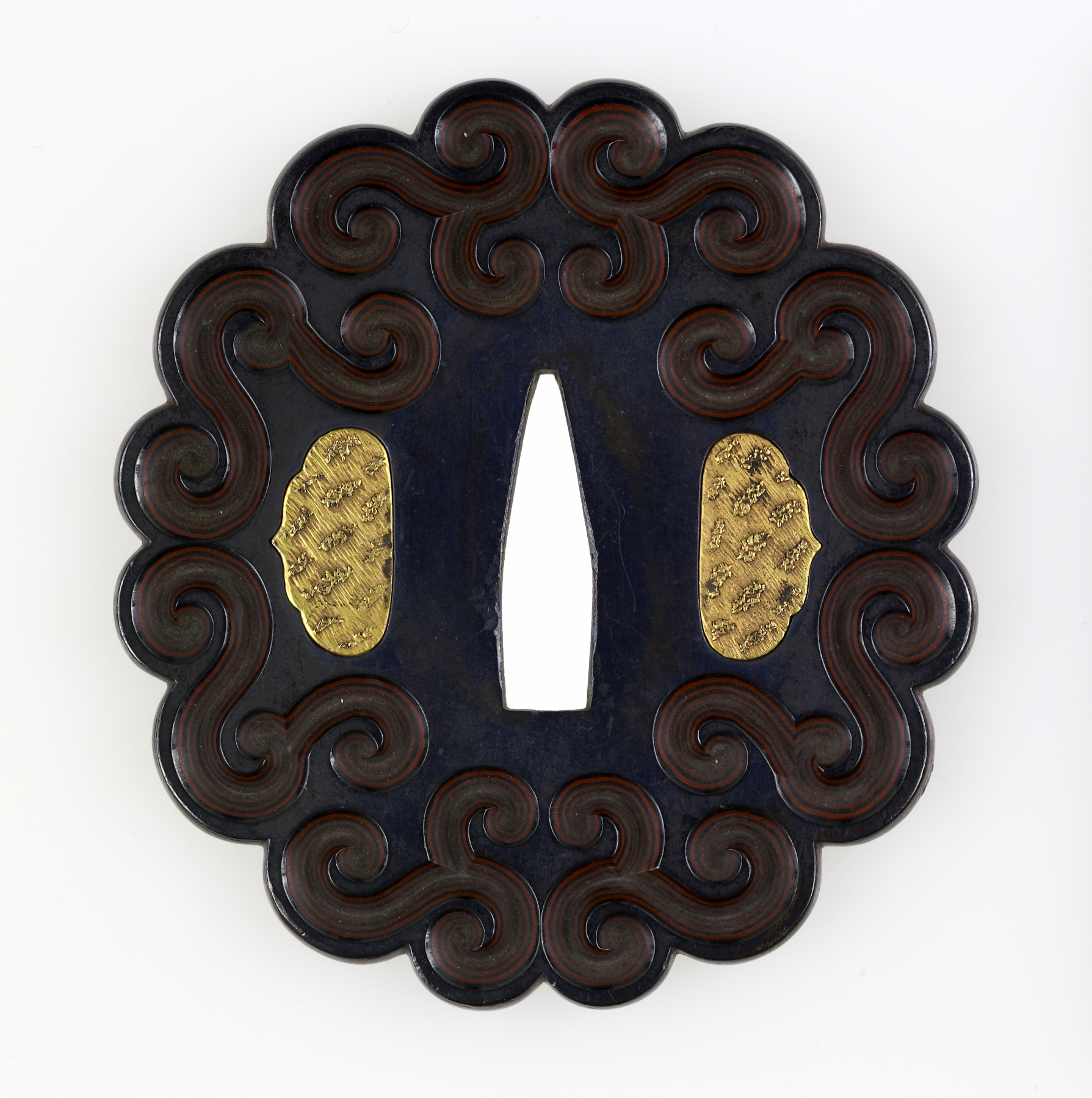
Japanese tsuba with geometric scrollwork design, not imitating plant forms, unknown date, shakudo and gold, Walters Art Museum, Baltimore, US

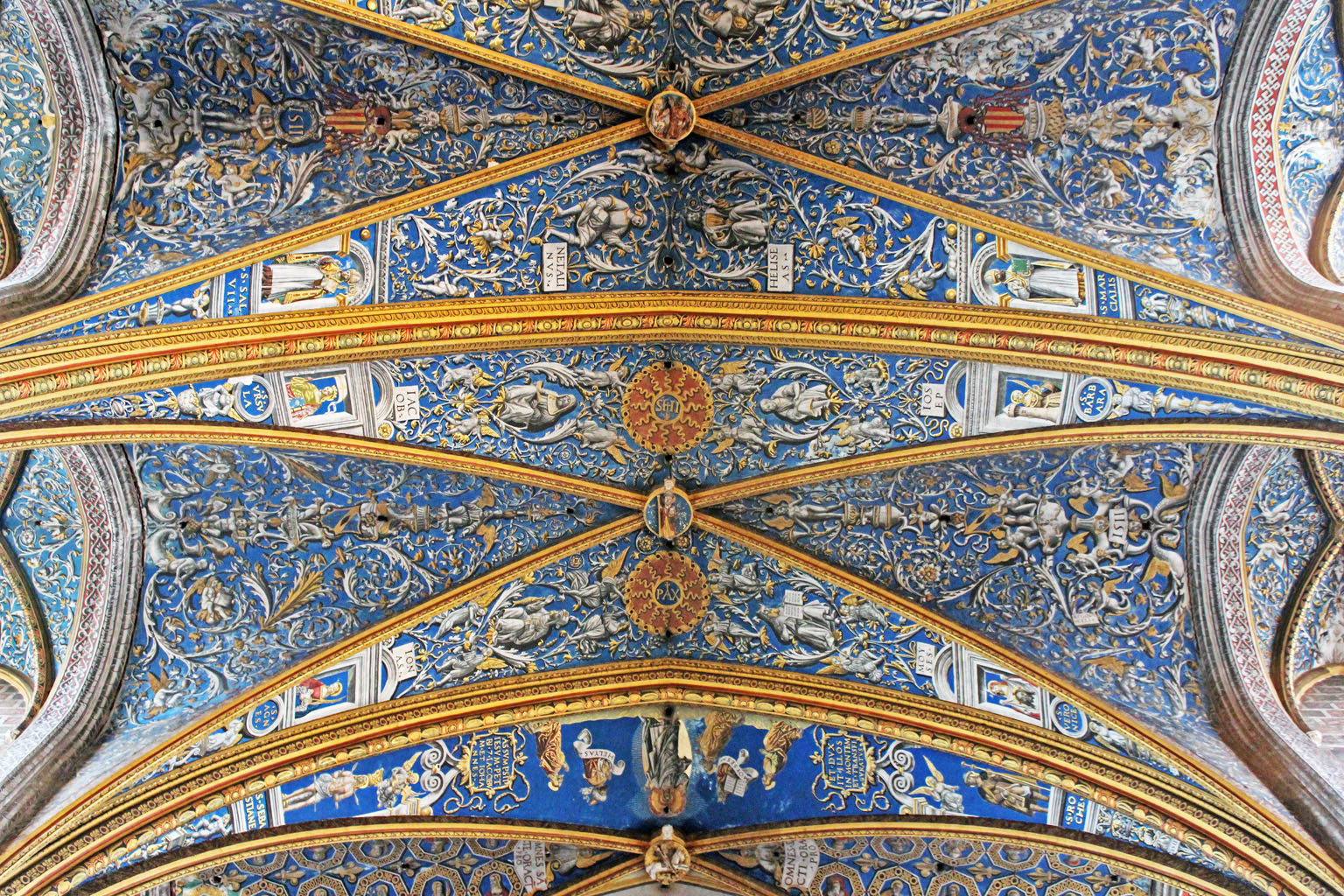
Renaissance scrolls in the Cathedral Basilica of Saint Cecilia, Albi, France, unknown painter, c.1480

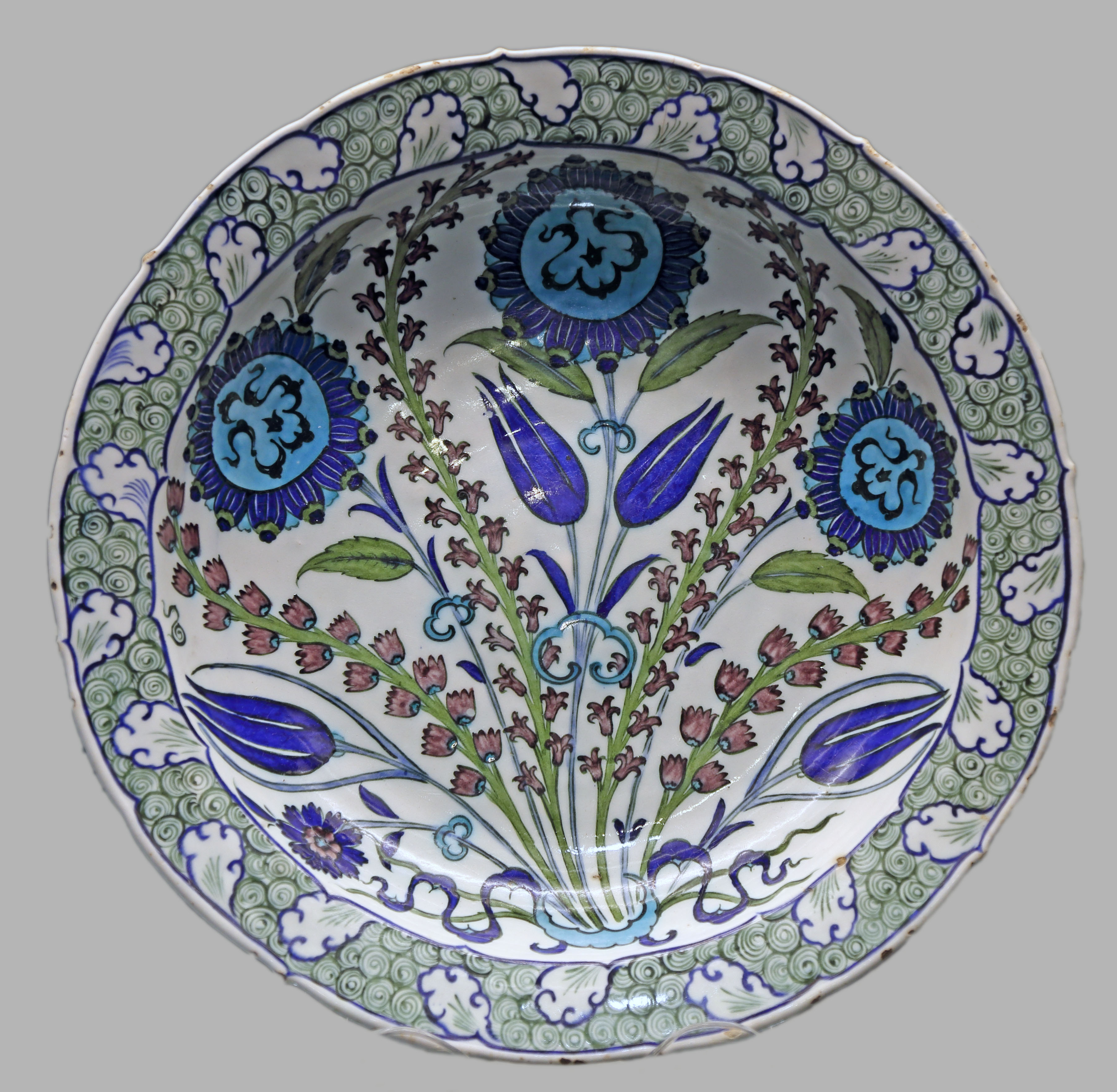
Turkish İznik pottery with rock and wave" scrolls round the rim, c.1550, stonepaste with underglaze decoration, British Museum

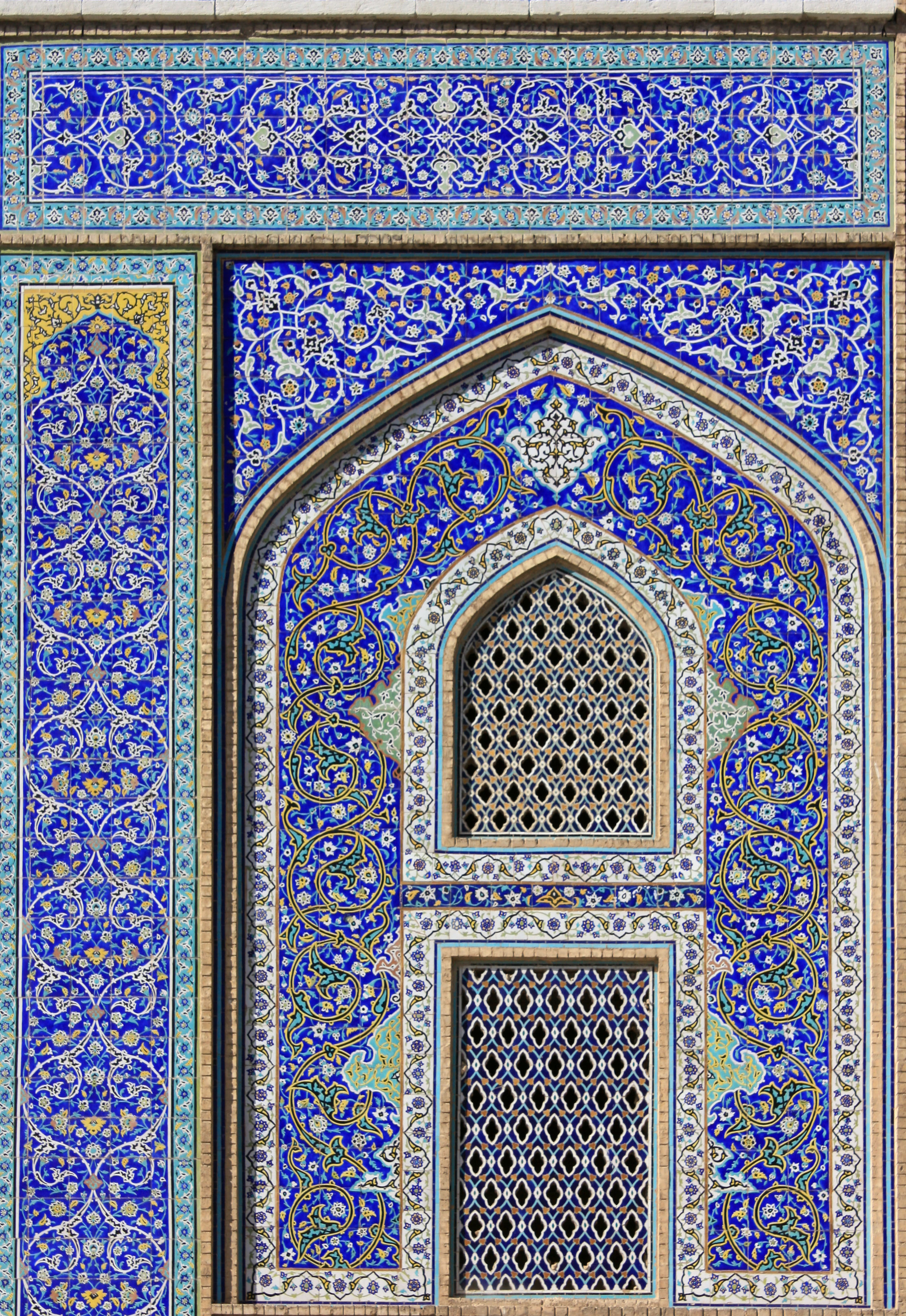
Islamic rinceaux of the Sheikh Lotfollah Mosque, Isfahan, Iran, designed by Ostad Mohammad Reza Isfahani, 1603-1619

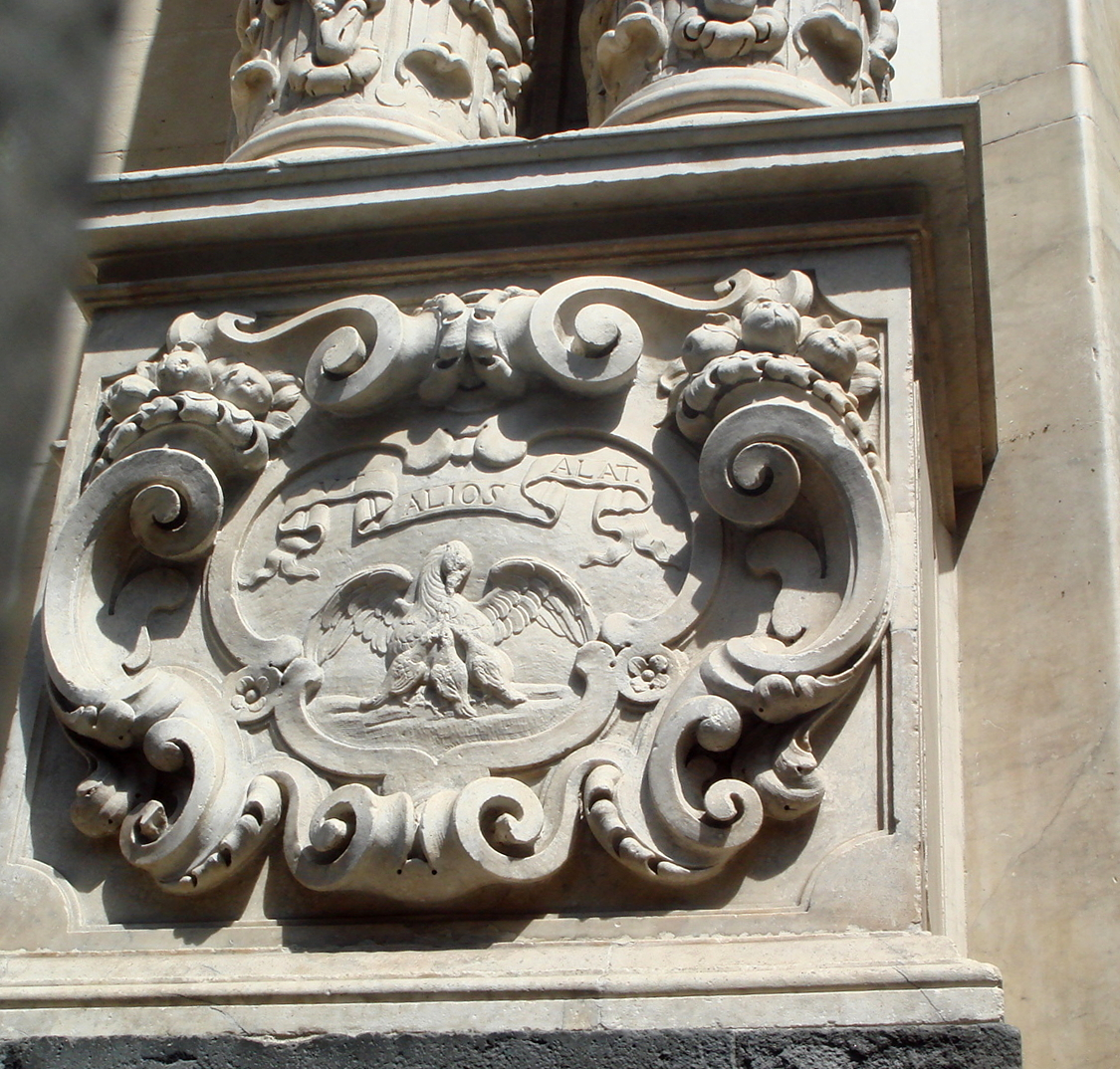
Baroque scrollwork on Badia di Sant'Agata, Catania, Italy, designed by Giovanni Battista Vaccarini, 1736-1742

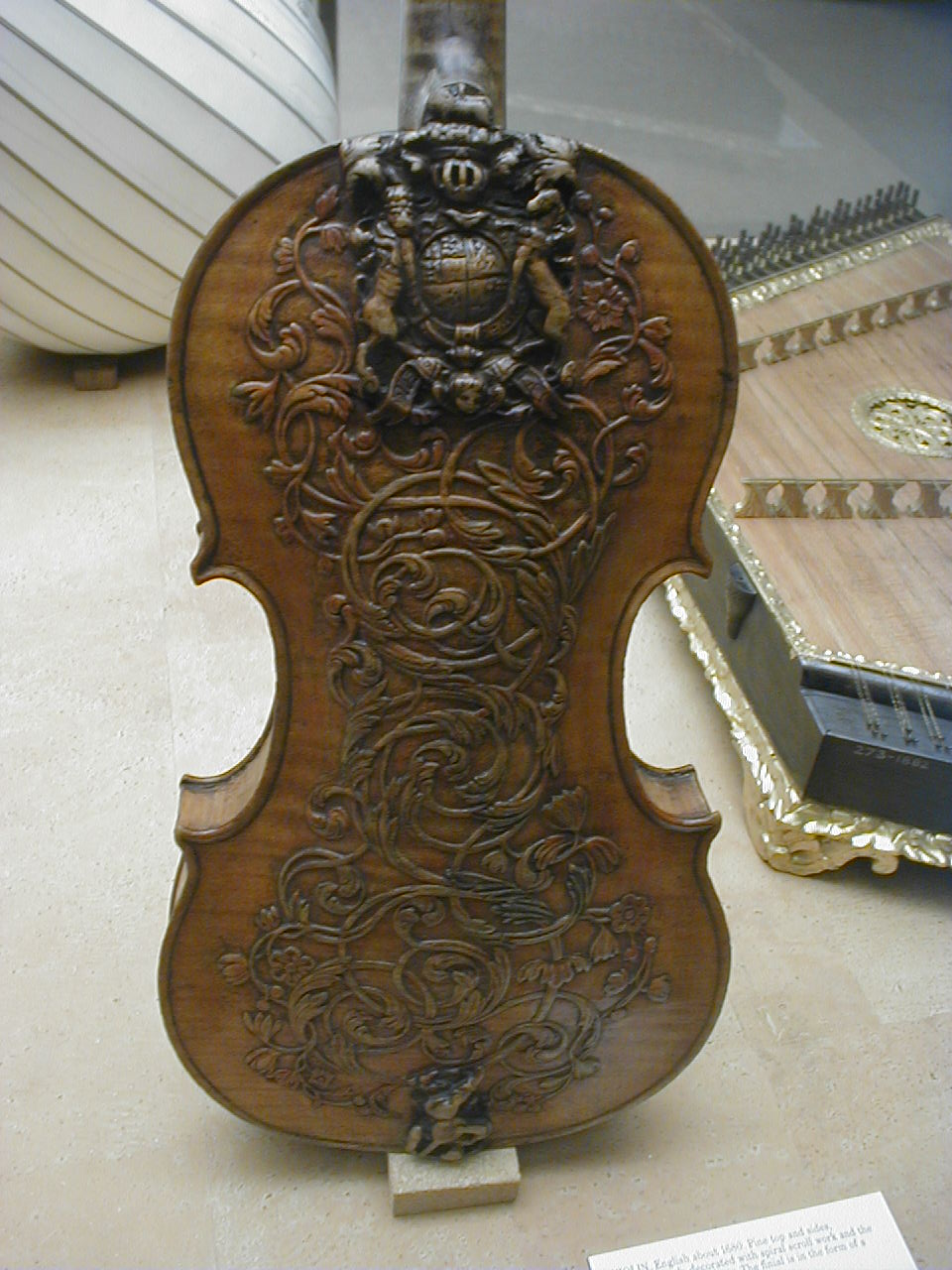
Baroque scrollwork and the royal arms of the Stuarts on the back of a violin, by Ralph Agutter, c.1685, pine and sycamore, Victoria and Albert Museum, London

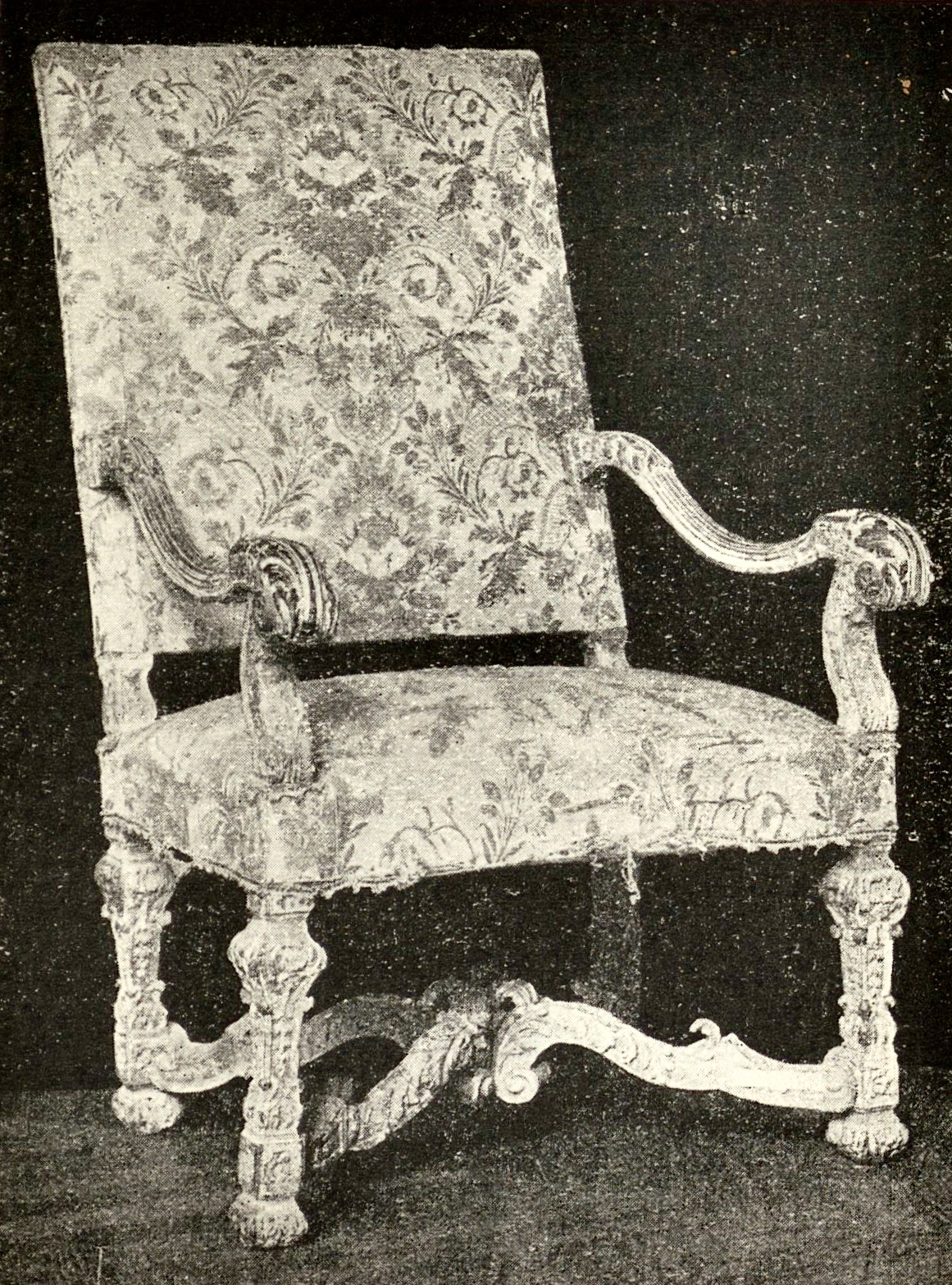
Louis XIV style armchair with scrolls at the tops of the arms, 17th-very early 18th century, wood and upholstery, unknown location

== Plant scrolls, Late antique to Early Medieval examples ==
- Santa Maria Maggiore, Rome. Sides of the apse mosaic, c. 432.
- Basilica di San Clemente, Rome, apse mosaic, c. 1200.
- Lateran, Rome, chapel of Saints Rufinus & Secundus, apse mosaic, 4th century.
- Mausoleum of Galla Placidia, Ravenna, mosaic in north lunette, c. 440.
- Treasury of Great Mosque of Damascus, mosaics of external walls, 7th century.
- Dome of the Rock Mosque, Jerusalem, mosaic in octagon, 691-2

== Pattern forms ==
- Vitruvian scroll
