= Palazzo Gioeni Asmundo =

Coordinates: 37.50772°N 15.08653°E

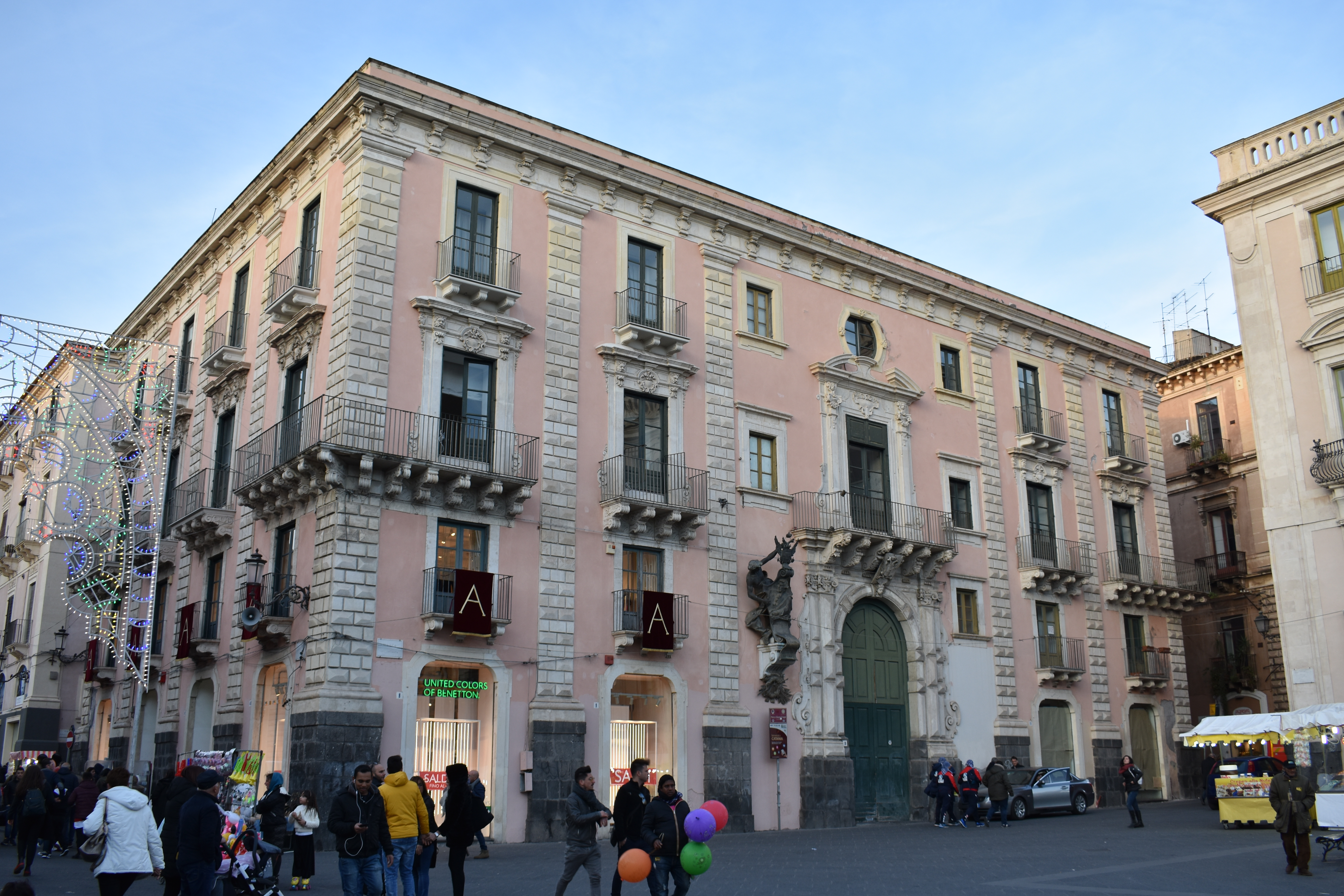
View of facade from Piazza dell'Università

The Palazzo Gioeni Asmundo is a notable palace located on via Fragalà #10 facing Piazza dell'Università in the center of Catania, region of Sicily, southern Italy. The building, like the two other prominent palaces facing this piazza, now houses offices of the University of Catania.

The palace design is attributed, like much of Baroque Catania, to Giovanni Battista Vaccarini. It was commissioned by the then Duke Gioeni d'Angiò and completed in 1743. The base is made with dark lava stones, and the palace is framed with blocks of white stone forming pillars. The piano nobile (third floor) has a number of balconies with metal balustrades. The central portico and third floor windows have elegant stone pediments with grotesque masks. The palace underwent an extensive remodeling in 1966.

Most notable on the facade is a bronze sculptural monument honoring Giuseppe Gioeni d'Angiò (Catania, 12 May 1743 – Catania, 6 December 1822). Giuseppe, son of the duke who commissioned the palace, achieved prominence for his writings about geology and the volcanos of Campania and Sicily. He was an avid collector of mineral and natural artifacts. He obtained a doctorate in philosophy and was made professor of Botanical and Natural History at the University of Catania. However his participation in politics during the turbulent Napoleonic era, led to his exile, and later imprisonment by the Bourbon authorities. The monument was completed in 1920 by Mario Rutelli, crowns his portrait with a complex Habsburg coat of arms and a coat of arms for his family. A local scientific society, Accademia Gioenia, is named in his honor.
