= Palazzo dell'Università, Catania =

Coordinates: 37.50363°N 15.08680°E

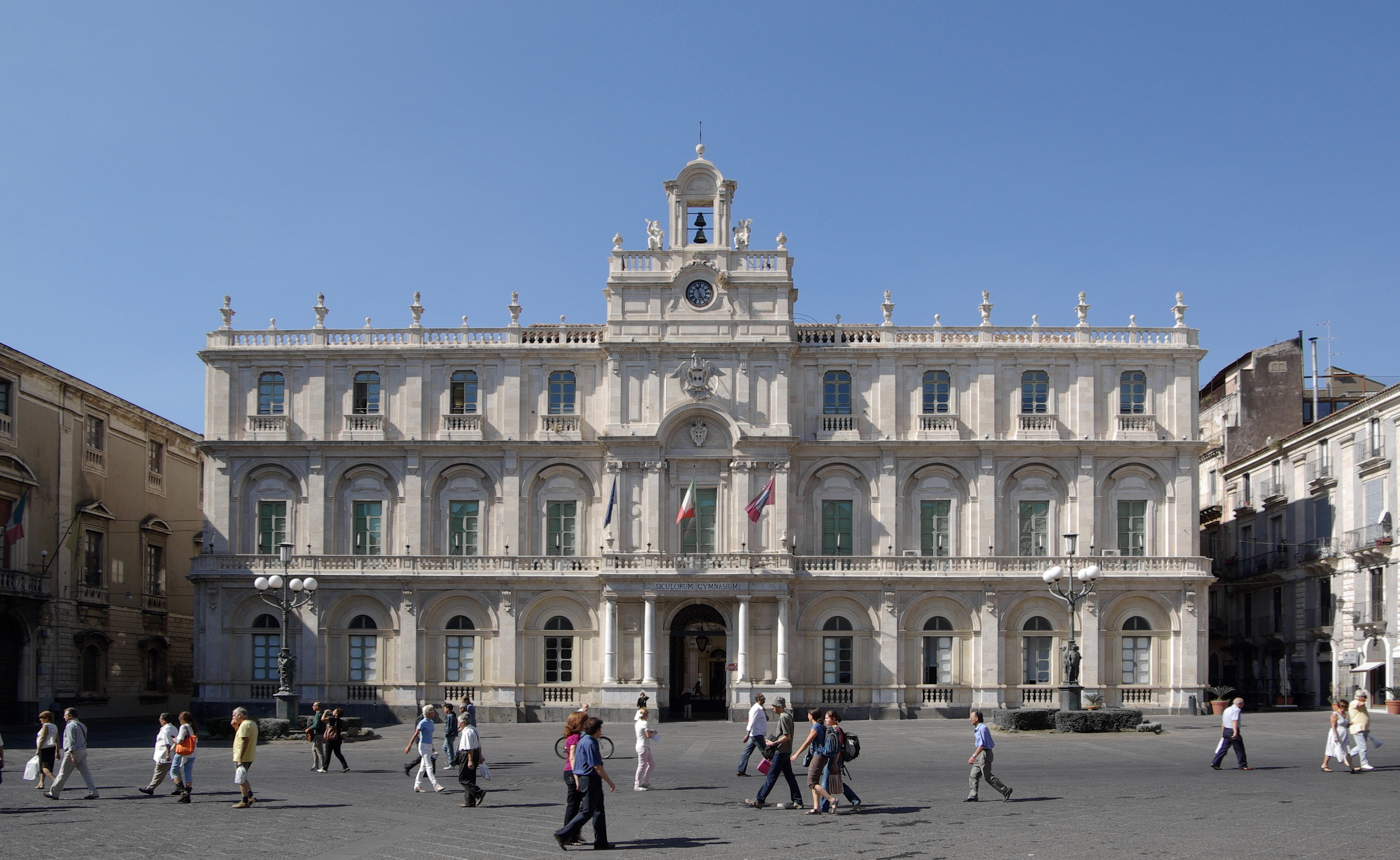
Facade of Palazzo Centrale dell'Università

The Palazzo dell'Università or Palazzo Centrale dell'Università di Catania is a monumental palace located in Piazza Universitaria, in the center of the city of Catania, region of Sicily, southern Italy. Since its construction, it has housed the main offices of the University of Catania, and stands across the piazza from the Palazzo San Giuliano, also housing offices of the university. It presently houses the offices of the rector, university offices, the "Giambattista Caruso" Regional Library, and a small museum of geology and archeology.

== History and description ==
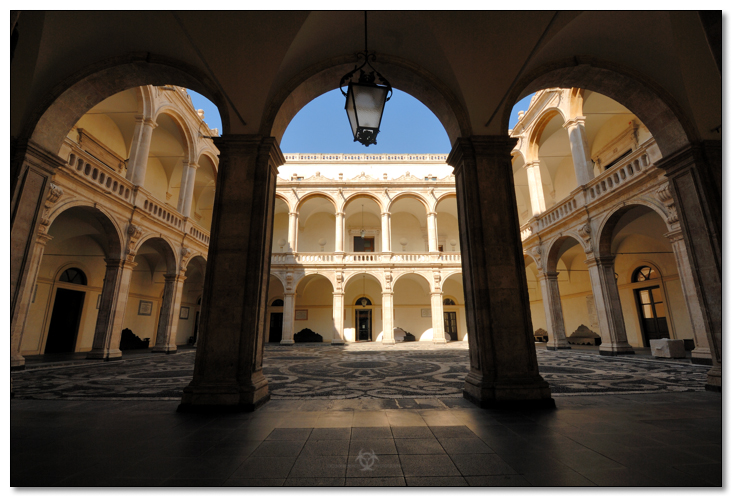
View of inner courtyard and pavement design

The University of Catania is among the 15 oldest universities in Italy; it predates the other large universities in Sicily, Palermo and Messina, by more than three centuries. The impetus for the foundation of the university at Catania came from Alfonso V, King of Aragon, Sardinia, and Sicily who granted the foundation of an institution of Studium Generale with the power to grant titles of baccalaurate and doctorate. Starting circa 1444, the institution had three faculties: theology; jurisprudence; and medical arts. The first laureate graduated in 1445.

Palazzo dell'Università (Night view)

The initial university home was a building alongside a seminary and adjacent to where the present Catania Cathedral. That site was razed to create the spaces around the cathedral, and the university moved to different locales until finding a home in 1684 the building of the ospedale San Marco, located at this site. However, like most of the city, the structure was razed by the 1693 earthquake. Construction of a new palace began within a few years, the present design is the product of some of the main architects of baroque Catania, Francesco Battaglia, and his son Antonino Battaglia, and by Giovanni Battista Vaccarini. The structure was completed by 1760. Further restructuring was pursued by Antoni Battisi after the earthquake of 1818, and in 1879 by engineer Mario Di Stefano with work on the portal.

The piazza in front, once called piazza della fiera del lunedì, ultimately acquired its present name of piazza dell'Università. Behind the prominently arcaded facade, in the piano nobile, is a large hall (aula magna) frescoed by Giovanni Battista Piparo. The center of the palace has a large courtyard, decorated with an elaborate pavement design using black and white stone. The architect Vaccarini had used similar projects in the Collegio, now Convitto Cutelli, and the Collegio dei Gesuiti (adjacent to St Francis Borgia church).
