= Palazzo San Giuliano, Catania =

Coordinates: 37°30′14″N 15°05′16″E

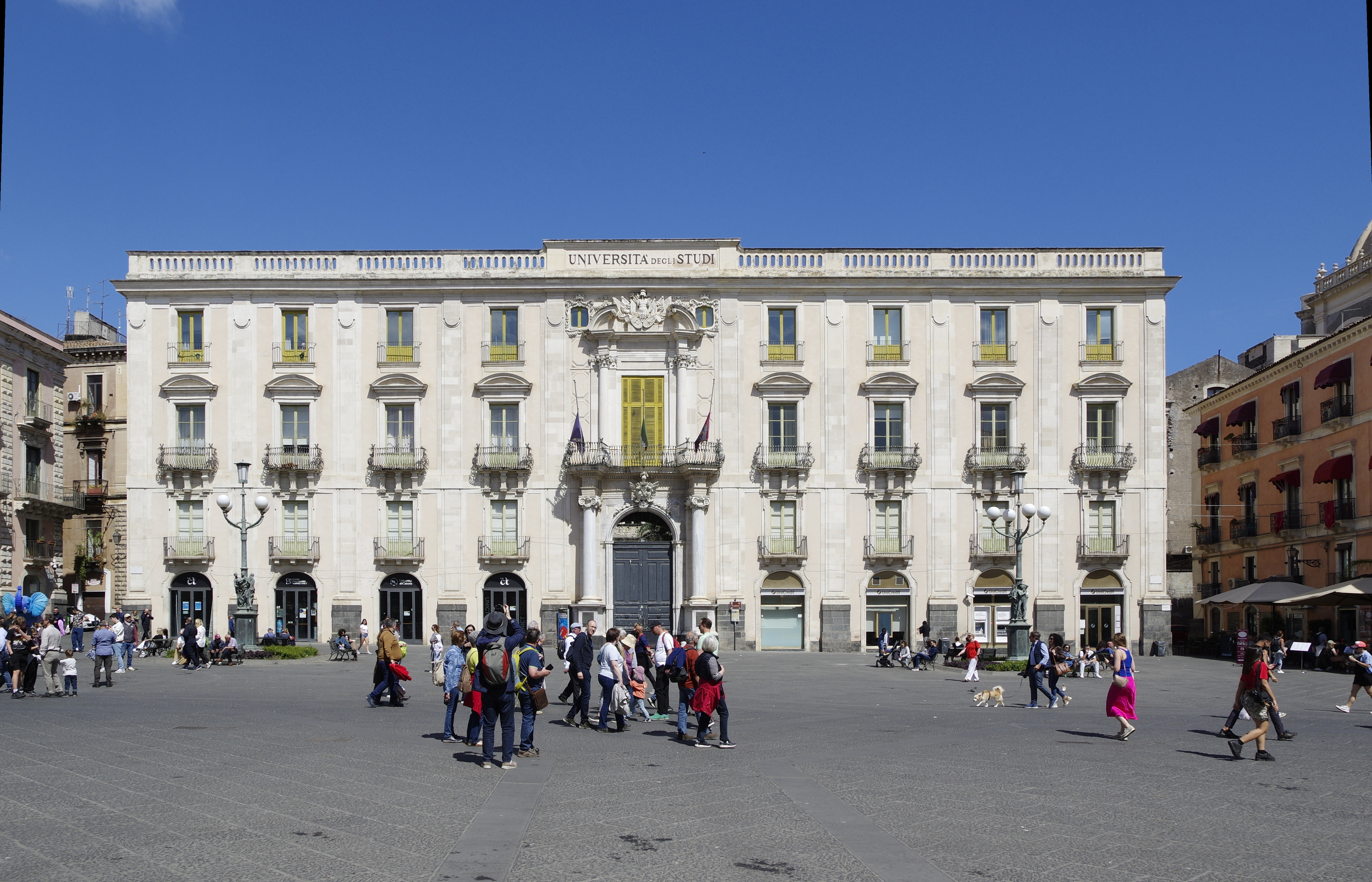
Facade of Palazzo San Giuliano

The Palazzo San Giuliano is a monumental palace located in Piazza Universitaria, in the center of the city of Catania, Sicily, southern Italy. Once a private home of the San Giuliano branch of the House of Paternò, it has also served as hospital, bank, theater, and hotel. Presently it houses the administrative offices of the University of Catania, and stands across the piazza from the Palazzo dell'Università, which has the rector's offices, a library, and a small museum.

== History and description ==
After the 1693 Sicily earthquake raze the prior structure at the site, a palace was commissioned by the Marquise of San Giuliano, a member of the aristocratic Paternò family. The work was completed in 1738 under the designs of Giovanni Battista Vaccarini. The interiors have undergone much modification. The roof balustrade was added in the 1930s. The palace has only belonged to the university since the 1980s.

The portal has two coat of arms, one on the left from the Paternò Castello family, and on the right from the Asmundos, later aristocratic owners of the palace. Inside the courtyard is a typical double flight of stairs to the piano nobile.
