= Giovanni Battista Vaccarini =

Sicilian architect

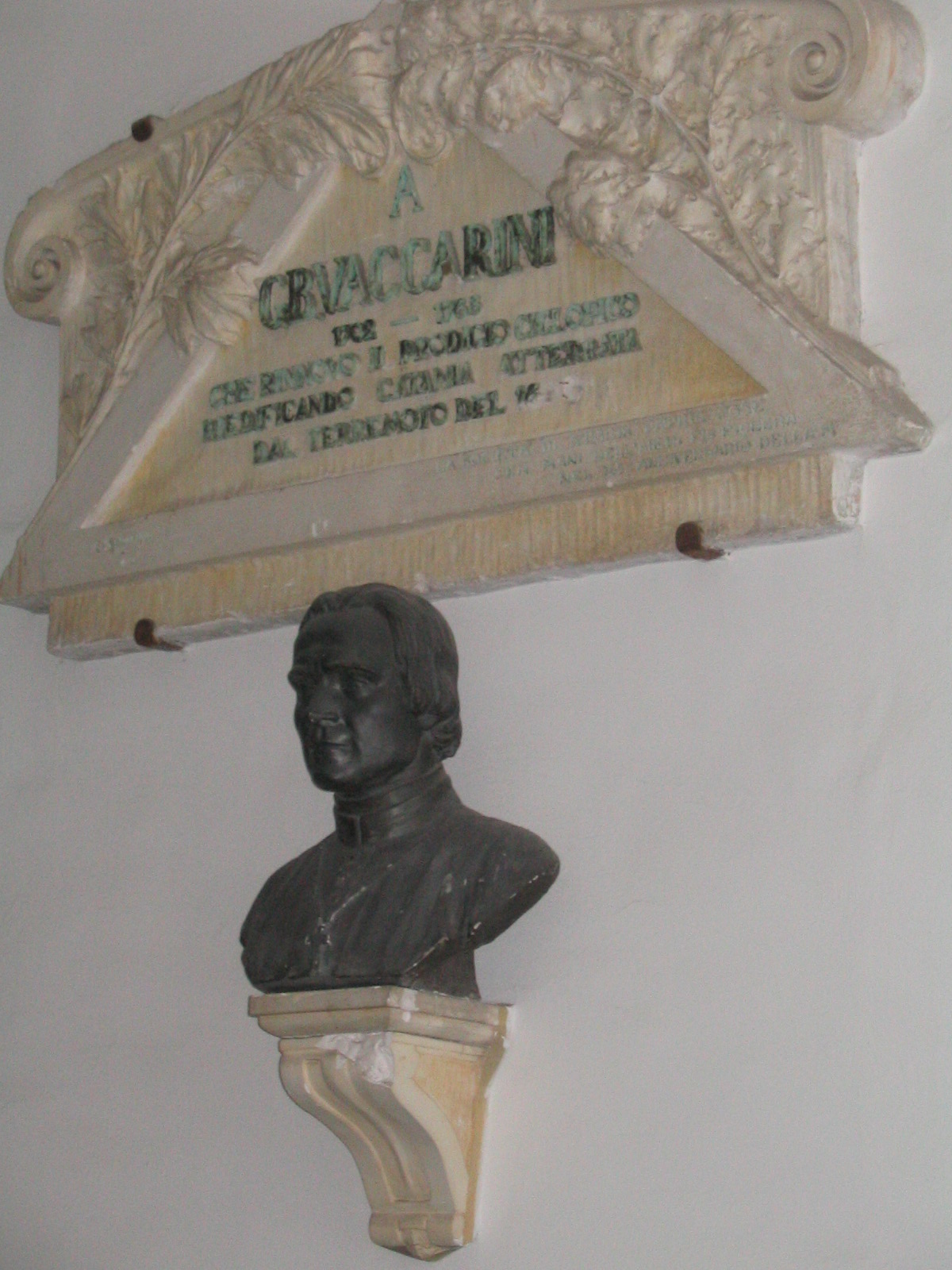
Giovanni Battista Vaccarini

Giovanni Battista Vaccarini (3 February 1702 – 11 March 1768) was a Sicilian architect, notable for his work in the Sicilian Baroque style in his homeland during the period of massive rebuilding following the earthquake of 1693. Many of his principal works can be found in the area in and around Catania.

== Biography ==
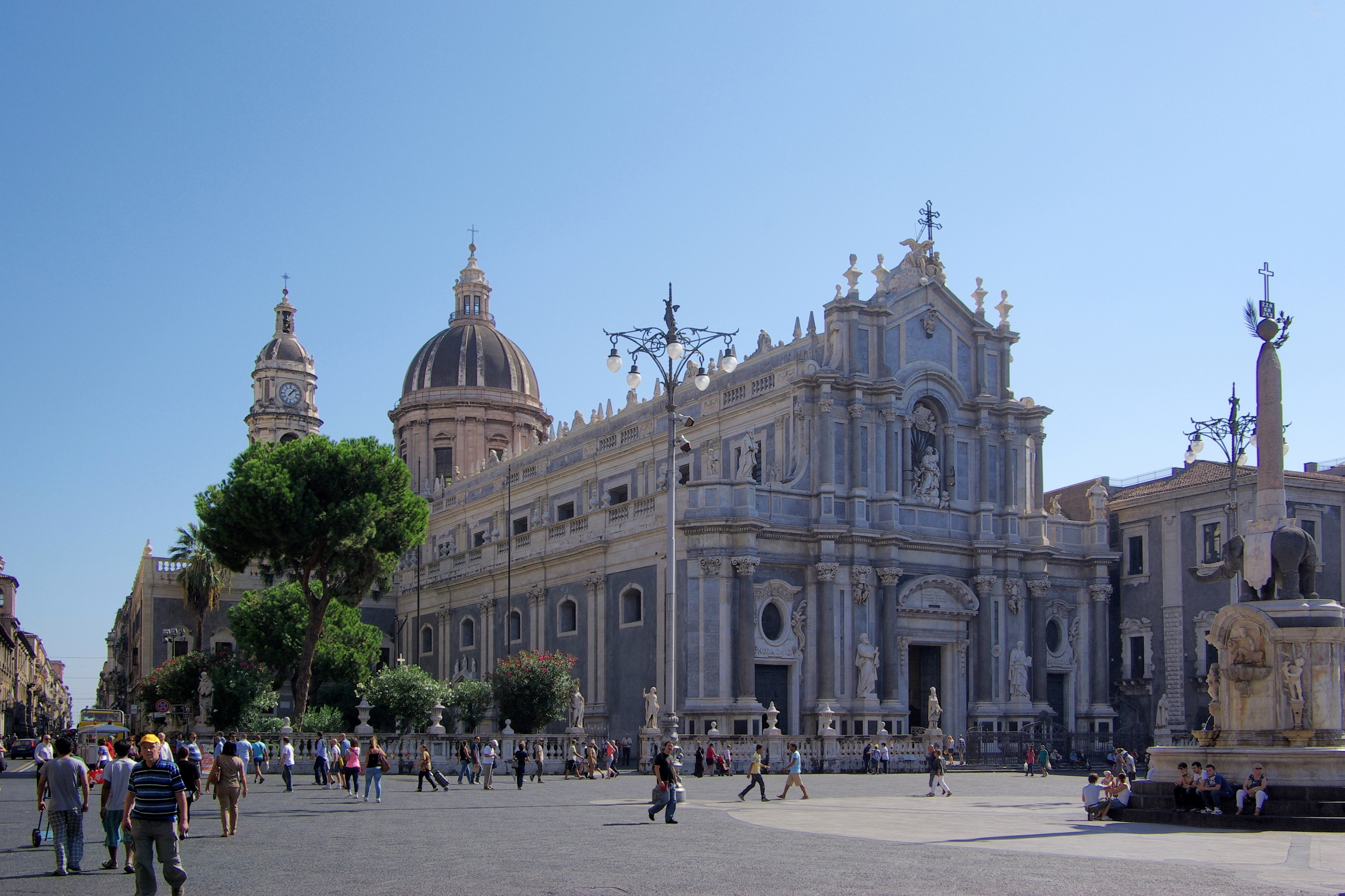
Duomo di Catania, facade design (1711) by Vaccarini.

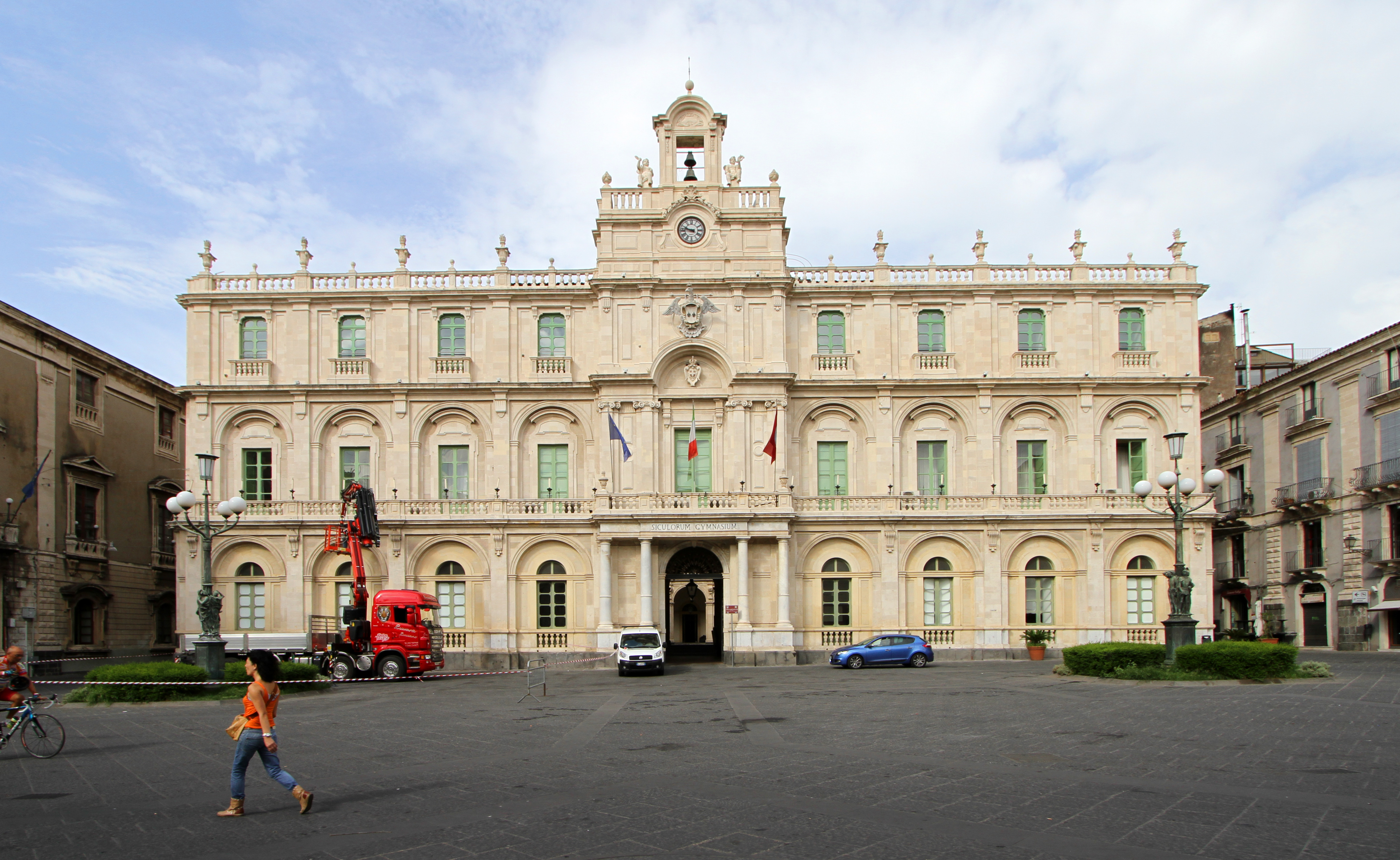
Palazzo dell'Università in Catania

Vaccarini was born in Palermo. During the 1720s, he studied architecture in Rome, with the support of Cardinal Pietro Ottoboni, the great patron of Corelli. Vaccarini was mostly interested on combining the styles of Borromini and Bernini. This was an eclectic fusion of architectural principles that was common at the end of the 17th century, producing such notable buildings as Giovan Antonio de' Rossi's Palazzo Altieri, and Palazzo Asti-Bonaparte.

Vaccarini returned to Sicily around 1730. His work seems then to have been influenced by the school of architecture of Alessandro Specchi, Francesco de Sanctis and Filippo Raguzzini, who tended to reject the classicising of buildings in favour of a much more flamboyant style. Both Specchi and de Sanctis were closely involved with the design of grand exterior staircases, common to Italian buildings with a second-story piano nobile, and the climate completely negating the requirement for an internal entrance hall on the ground floor in order to provide quick easy access. De Sanctis had taken this feature one step further in 1723 with his design for the Spanish Steps in Rome. This grand staircase approach to a building was to be invaluable in Sicily, not only for the practical reasons of entering the piano nobile, but also for the creation of a grand approach to churches and cathedrals, where the topography of the site permits such a feature.

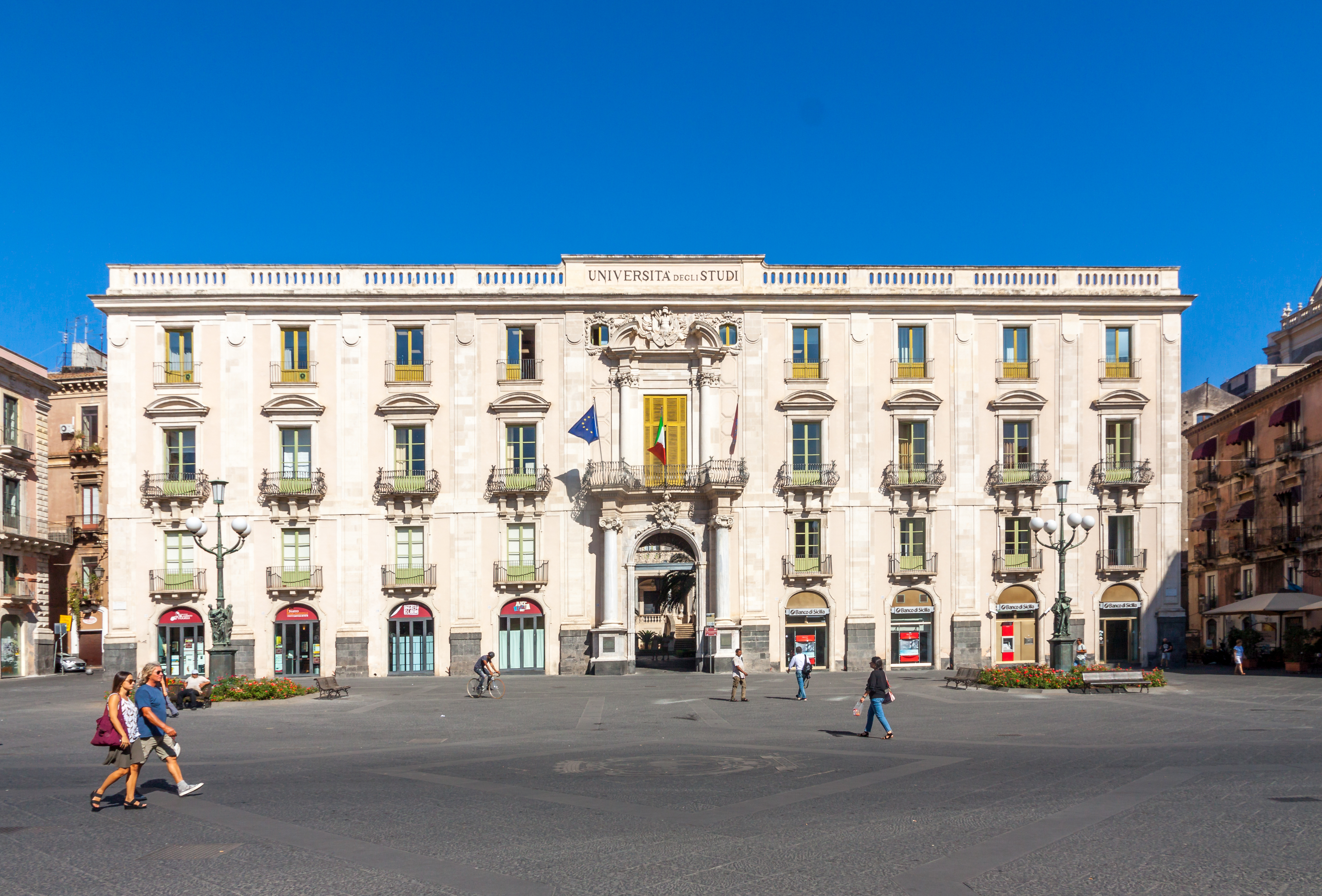
Palazzo San Giuliano, Catania

The ground floor of the Palazzo degli Elefanti in Catania (already in construction when Vaccarini came to the project) shows the decorated rustication in a 16th-century Sicilian fashion. The ground floor pilasters continue but unrusticated, the cornice they support is entirely in accordance with Roman contemporary design, as are the windows. The windows on the piano nobile have straight, but broken, pediments with canted sides, a theme commonly reproduced by Vaccarini in ensuing years. The free-standing columns supporting a straight balcony endow a pompous grandeur to the entrance. The balcony was to become a feature of Sicilian Baroque; it was later to take many shapes, often curved, serpentine, or a combination of both juxtaposing. He also designed a number of the buildings around Piazza dell'Università such as the Palazzo dell'Università (Sicolorum Gymnasium) and Palazzo San Giuliano.

In front of Palazzo degli Elefanti, Vaccarini designed a fountain, consisting in an obelisk upon the back of the elephant u Liotru (now the symbol of Catania), inspired by the Hypnerotomachia Poliphili. Vaccarini completed the square by designing the main facade of the cathedral, a thirty-year project not completed until 1768.

As a church architect, Vaccarini introduced into Sicily the church plans of the Renaissance which had passed Sicily by. However, many of his churches are based on the designs of churches he had seen in Rome. The church of S. Agata in Catania, for instance, is based on Sant'Agnese in Agone (Rome).

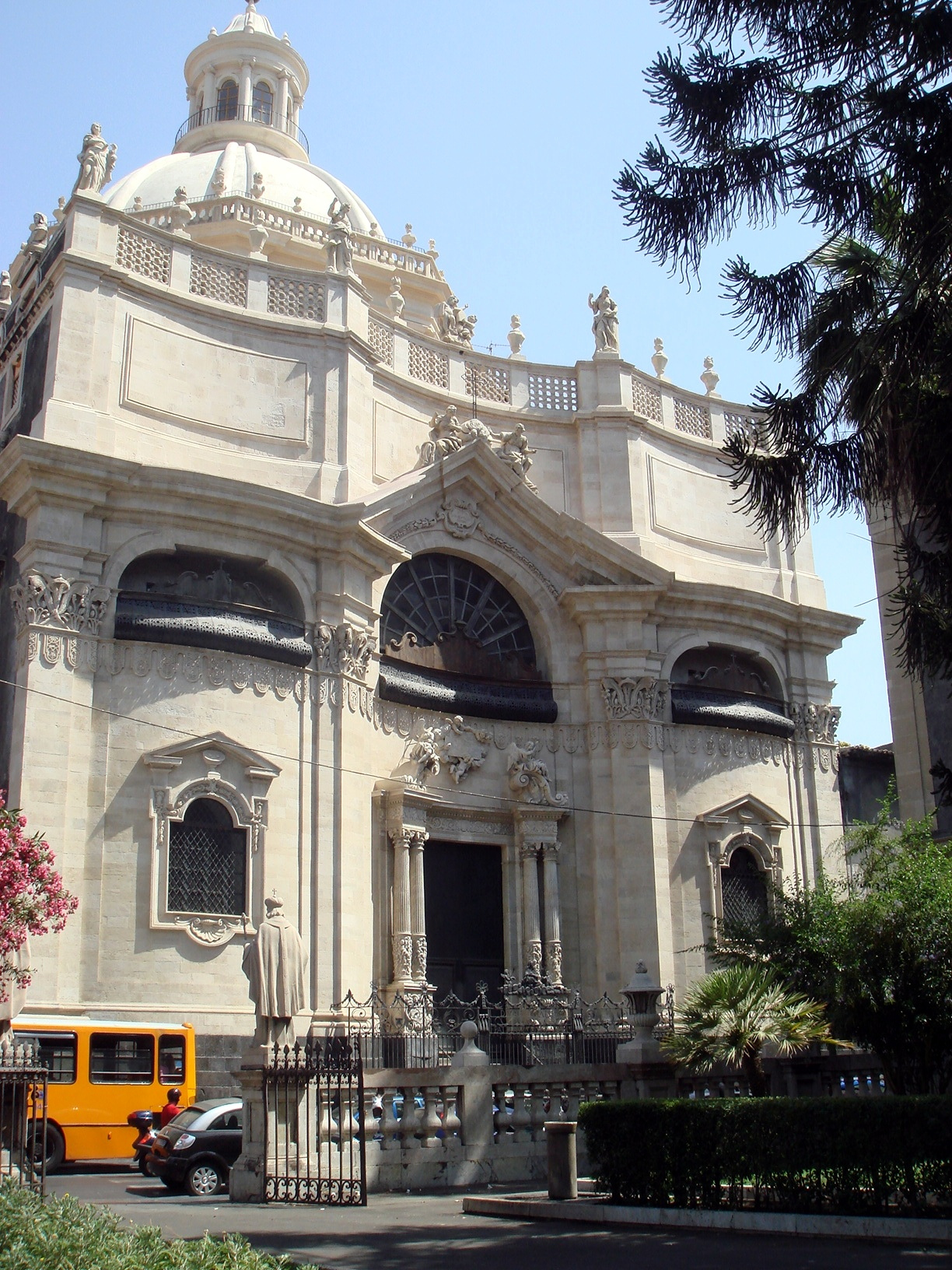
Chiesa della Badia di Sant'Agata

Vaccarini's Baroque became prevalent in Catania, and much copied for three-quarters of a century. However, he was not employed only in Sicily, since in 1756 he journeyed to Naples to aid Vanvitelli and Ferdinando Fuga in the construction of the marble Palace of Caserta. Vanvitelli's influence is clearly visible in Vaccarini's final works, especially the Collegio Cutelli and the Badia di Sant'Agata.

Vaccarini died in Palermo in 1768.

== Analysis ==
Vaccarini is notable today for his input into the development of Sicilian Baroque. While much of his work was later overshadowed by a younger generation of Sicilian architects, he was one of the founding architects of the style; in particular, his handling of the Baroque double staircase, which continued to evolve, in a way peculiar to Sicily, after his death.
