= Palazzo Cutelli =

Coordinates: 37.50343°N 15.09282°E

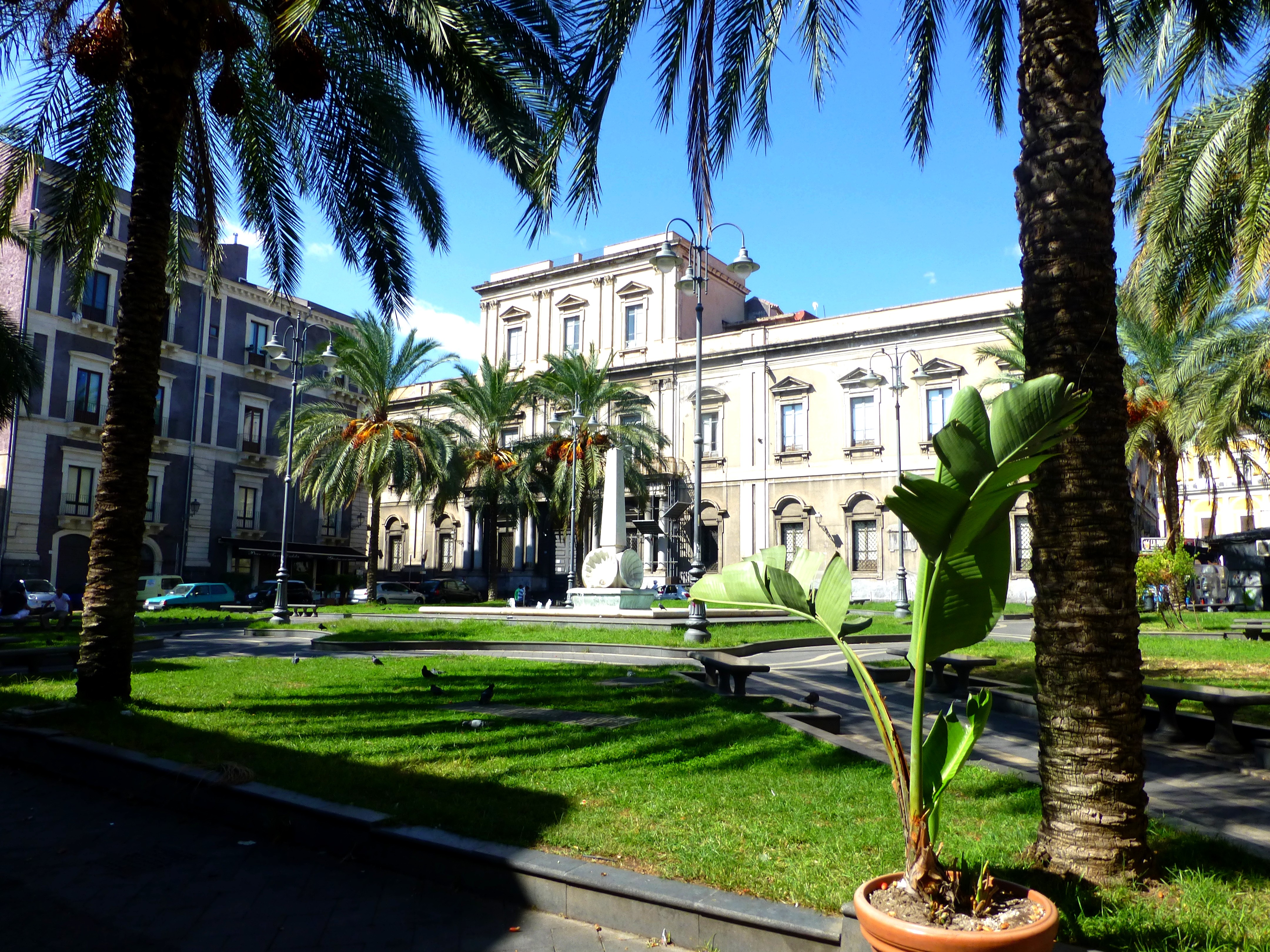
View of the Convitto Cutelli from across the piazza

The Palazzo Cutelli is a historic palace, once housing the Collegio Cutelli, now the semiprivate Convitto Cutelli, a boarding school from primary to lyceum grades, located on Via Vittorio Emanuele #56 in central Catania, region of Sicily, Italy.

== History and description ==
In 1654, count Mario Cutelli, a judge in Catania, endowed in his will the establishment of a private, secular college to train young noblemen in the arts of governance and law. The turbulence of the next century, including the 1693 earthquake, meant the physical construction of the present baroque architecture college was not complete until 1779, designed by Giovanni Battista Vaccarini and completed by Francesco Battaglia.

The facade is sober and broad with a set of 8 columns surrounding a central balcony with an iron balustrade. It faces the Piazza Cutelli with a central fountain with a nineteenth century fountain, Fontana delle Conchiglie, with four conch shells forming a plinth for a small obelisk. The two story structure is most impressive when viewed from within the central circular courtyard. The courtyard has white and black stone design, one of a few designed by Vaccarini in town, with an elaborate design of spokes. Around this courtyard is a portico of doric pilasters supporting arches, all surmounted by a circumferential balcony. The piano nobile is accessed by an imposing stairwell. A third story is located in the portion of the college destined to house the rectors of the institution.
