= Badia di Sant'Agata =

Roman Catholic church in Catania, Italy

Coordinates: 37.502939882257245°N 15.088136050521733°E

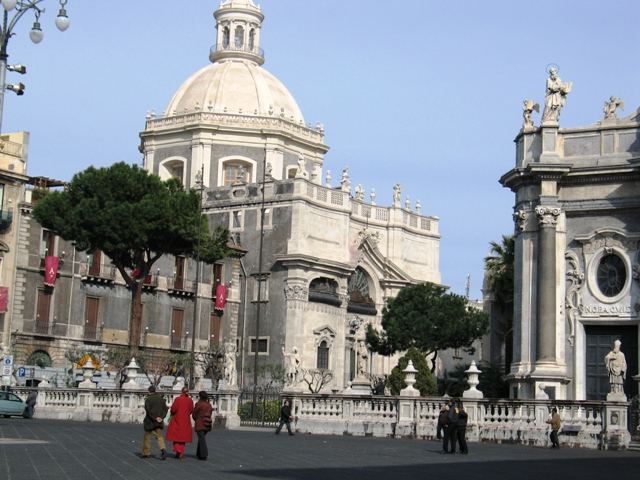
View of the facade and dome of the Badia, on the right of the photo is a portion of Catania Cathedral

Badia di Sant'Agata or Abbey of St Agatha is an 18th-century Roman Catholic church and attached female convent located on Via Vittorio Emanuele #182 in the center of Catania, region of Sicily, Southern Italy. The Baroque style church facade is across the street from the left transept of the Cathedral of Catania.

== History and description ==
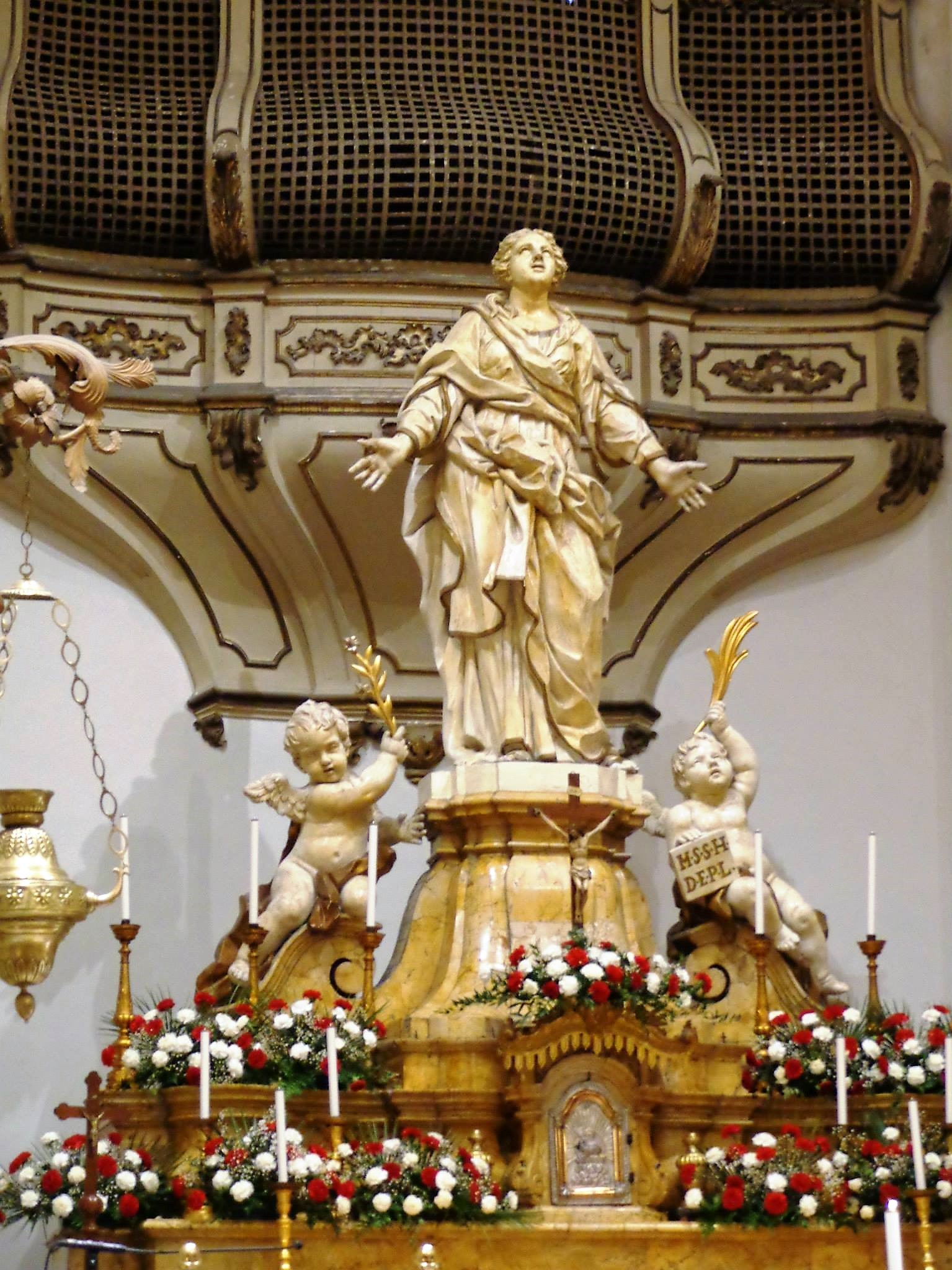
Statue of St Agatha at main altar. Behind is the nuns viewing area with a metal grid. The altar is made from amber-like yellow Castronovo marble

This monastery was founded in 1620, under the Benedictine rule, with an endowment by Erasmo Cicala. The church was erected at the site of a prior church and monastery that had been razed by the 1693 earthquake. The earthquake putatively killed 15 or the 28 nuns. The complex is dedicated the St Agatha of Sicily, patron of Catania and to whom over a half-dozen churches in town are also dedicated.

Reconstruction was slow, initially to house the cloistered nuns at the site, a fence had to be erected, and they found shelter among the ruins. In 1720, a legacy of 4000 scudi by Giuseppe Moncada led to construction beginning in 1736, under the designs and guidance of Giovanni Battista Vaccarini. The facade was complete by 1742, it utilized the seventeenth-century portal designed by Giovanni Maria Amato, which had survived the earthquake. The octagonal dome was not complete until 1768. Like many of the monasteries in town, special grills both metal and balconies with stone fretwork allowed the cloistered nuns to see street life and the numerous religious processions. Inside the church a metal grill behind the main altar has a viewing balcony that allowed the nuns to attend mass, while sheltered from the public. The base of the dome allows for views of the city and the looming volcano of Mount Etna.

The interior is an elongated octagon with white marble floors and yellow Castronovo marble, a material selected by the architect Nicolò Daniele. In 1782 Giovanni Battista Marino, Mario Biondo and Giovanni Battista Amato completed the stucco altarpiece statues, depicting in the side altars: St Benedict, the Immaculate Conception, St Joseph, and St Euplio. The main altar has a Statue of Saint Agatha reminiscent of Ercole Ferrata's Sant'Agnese on the Pyre in the Roman church of Sant'Agnese in Agone. The church consecration ceremony was completed in 1796. Under the dome hangs a large glass chandelier.

Damaged by the 1990 earthquake, repairs were complete by 2012.

== See also ==
- 18th-century Western domes
