= Piazza dell'Università, Catania =

Square in Catania, Sicily

Coordinates: 37.5037°N 15.0872°E

Piazza dell'Università is a city square in the historic center of the city of Catania, in Sicily, Italy. It is bisected by Via Etnea.

== Description ==
The piazza is surrounded by buildings now occupied with offices of the University of Catania: Palazzo dell'Università; Palazzo Gioeni Asmundo; and the Palazzo San Giuliano. An 1864 guidebook calls this the Piazza degli Studi, and recalls the piazza once previously hosted a statue of the Bourbon King Francis I of the Two Sicilies by Antonio Cali.

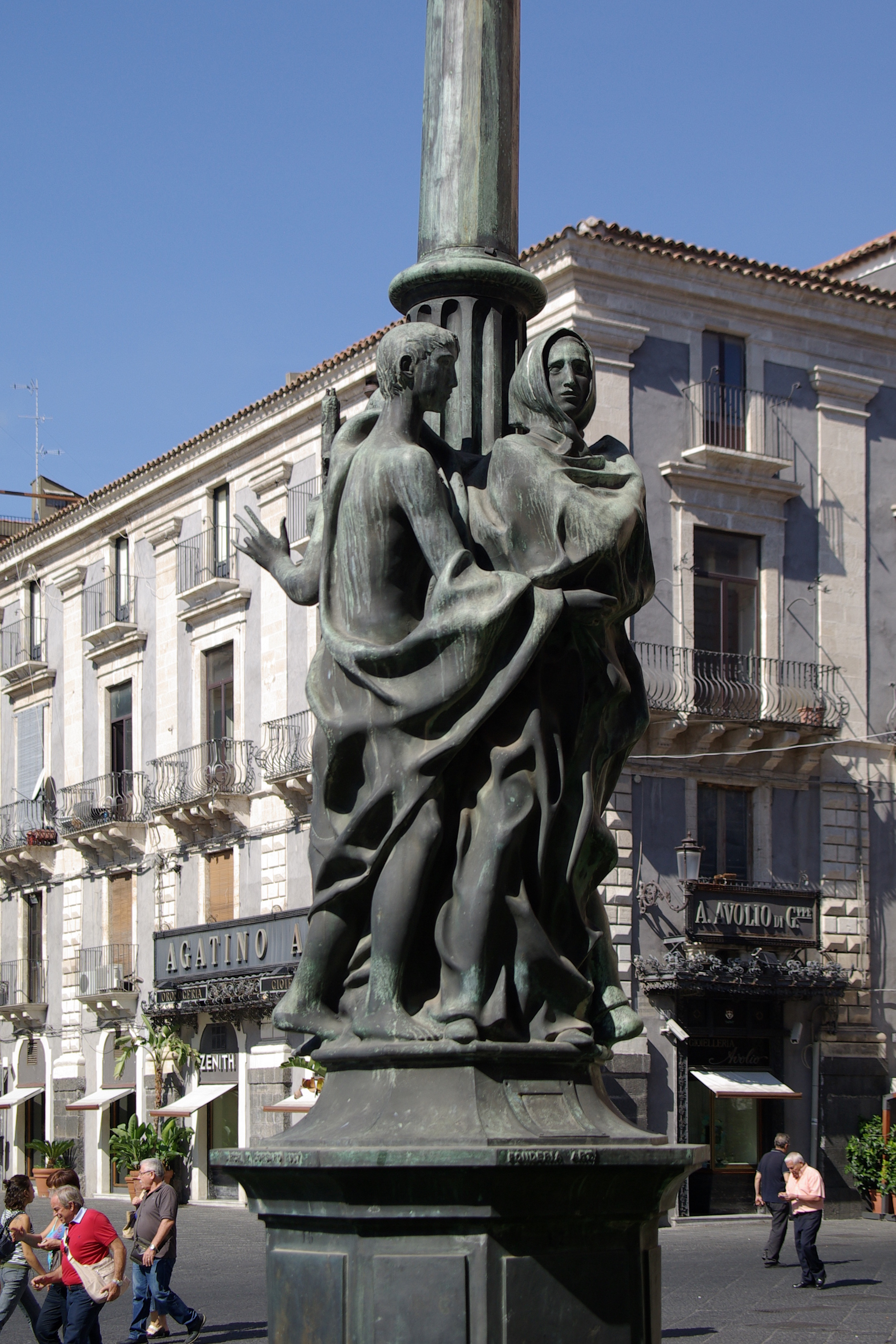
Micro-statues of Fratelle Pii in front of Palazzo Gioeni Asmundo

In the piazza are four lamp-posts, completed in 1957, in a program designed by Vincenzo Corsaro; each depicts a separate myth or legend linked to Catania sculpted in bronze by Mimì Maria Lazzaro and Domenico Tudisco. The lamp-posts suggest a candelabra, thus associated with a tradition of the candeloro displayed during the Festival di Sant'Agata. The four stories linked to the lamp-posts are:

- Gammazita: the story is that she is the chaste woman, who dies for virtue by jumping into a well, to rebuff the assaults of a French soldier. The event is said to have prompted the Sicilian Vespers. The name is supposed to link gemma (gem) and zita (betrothed or spouse).
- Paladin Uzeda: this Catanian knight fighting for the Norman Count Ruggero I of Sicily defeated a Saracen giant Ursini during the reconquest of Sicily, while born from humble parents, he was able to win the hand of a princess
- Fratelli Pii: Two brothers seeing a river of lava from Etna threaten their elders, carry them to safety on their backs, the streams of lava parting to allow them to pass. The story shows pious devotion, and has echoes of Aeneas carrying his father Anchises from the fallen Troy, and a putative miracle by St Agatha sparing Catania from the lava flow.
- Colapesce: The story is linked to a symbol of Sicily: a face surrounded by three angles legs. Colapesce (Tail-fish) is or becomes a mermaid boy, able to swim and dive prodigiously. Confronted by Count Ruggero, he is asked if he can see from beneath the water, the fires of Mount Etna. He says he can, and to confirm this, he takes a log down in a dive. He does not return, but the singed log is ejected from the volcano in an eruption.
