= Angelus of Jerusalem =

Catholic saint (1185–1220)

Saint Angelus of Jerusalem OCarm
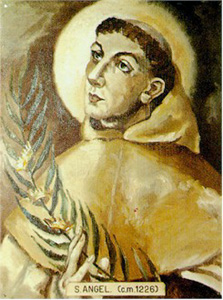
- Image of Saint Angelus of Jerusalem

Martyr
- Born: 1185; Jerusalem, Kingdom of Jerusalem
- Died: 5 May 1220 (aged 35); Licata, Kingdom of Sicily
- Venerated in: Roman Catholic Church
- Canonized: c. 1459, Rome, Papal States by Pope Pius II
- Major shrine: Santa Maria del Carmine
- Feast: 5 May
- Attributes: Carmelite habit and rule, knife in his head or sword in this breast, crucifix, martyr's palm
- Patronage: Palermo

Angelus of Jerusalem, OCarm (Italian: Sant'Angelo; 1185 – 5 May 1220) was a Catholic convert from Judaism and a religious priest of the Carmelites of the Ancient Observance.

Angelus and his twin brother became converts to the faith following their mother's conversion. Both went on to become ordained priests and Carmelite friars. Unlike his brother, however, he retreated into the desert to a hermitage after his ordination, but he emerged once he was instructed to go to the Italian mainland to evangelize as well as to meet with Pope Honorius III to have him approve a new rule for the Carmelites.

He was slain whilst preaching and was believed a saint after his death. The Carmelites venerated him as such until during his pontificate Pope Pius II beatified the slain priest circa 1459.

== Life ==
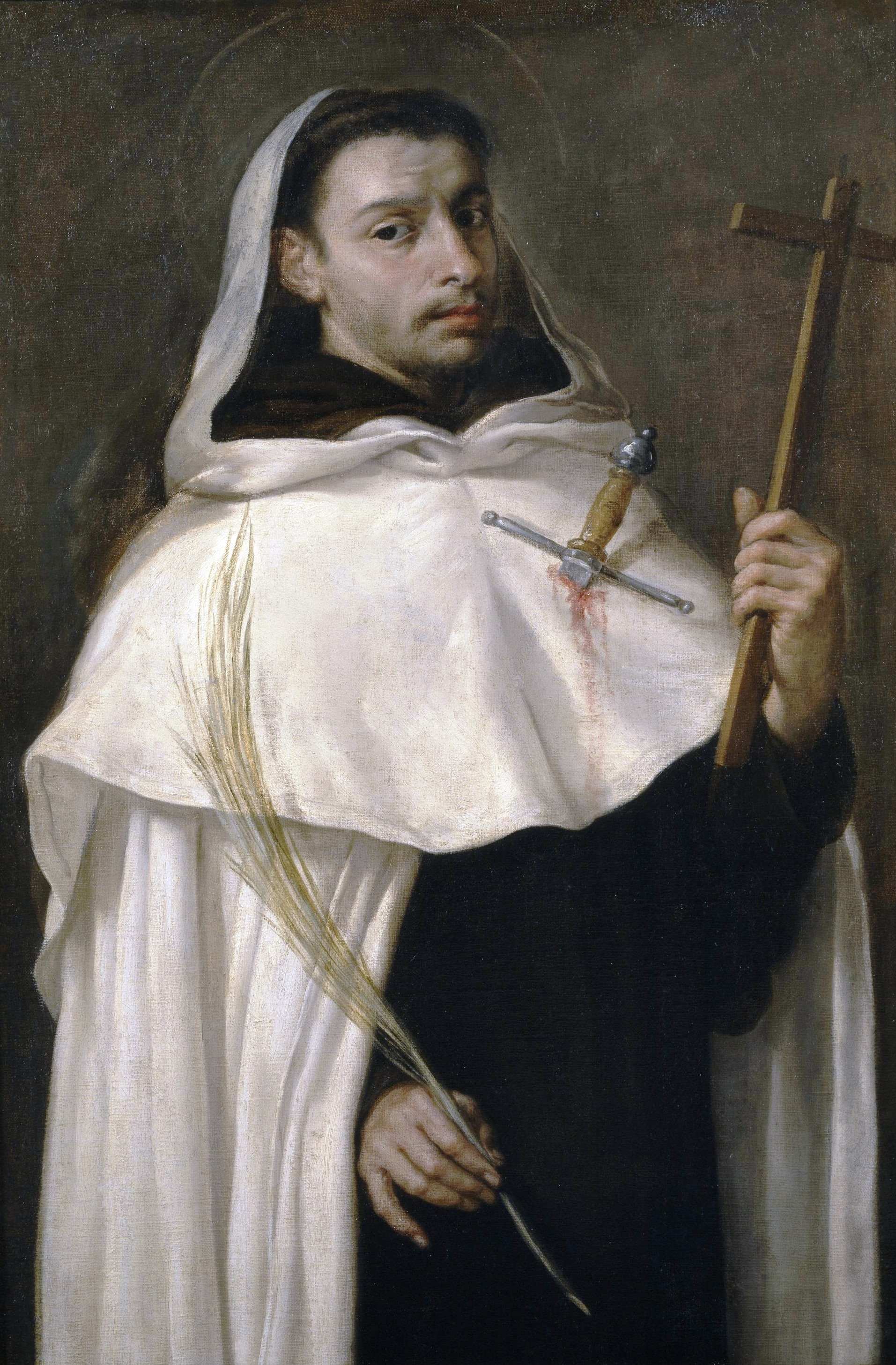
Painting by Antonio de Pereda, c. 1667

Angelus was born in Jerusalem in 1185 to Jewish parents. His mother later converted to Christianity, and both he and his twin brother John were baptised into the Catholic Church when she converted. His parents died while Angelus and his brother were still children, and the Patriarch Nicodemus oversaw their education until the twins turned eighteen. At that age, he and his brother John entered the Order of the Brothers of the Blessed Virgin Mary of Mount Carmel at the Saint Anne convent near the Golden Gate to commence their novitiate. The two could speak Greek as well as both Latin and Hebrew.

In 1210, Angelus was ordained to the priesthood in Jerusalem and he travelled in Palestine. Miraculous cures were attributed to him around this time and his acta stated that he sought to avoid fame and withdrew to a hermitage in the desert when he was becoming popular for his miracles. He became a hermit on Mount Carmel when he was instructed in 1218 to leave for the Italian peninsula in order to preach against the patarini as well as the Albigensians and the Bulgars. He had likewise been instructed to go to Rome to obtain from Pope Honorius III confirmation of the new and definitive rule for the order (later granted in 1226).

Angelus was one of the first friars to come to Sicily from Mount Carmel. He set off on a Genoese ship on 1 April 1219 and stopped first in Messina before heading off to Civitavecchia before he ended up in Rome to meet with the pope. The friar preached in the Basilica of Saint John Lateran while in Rome where he met both Francis of Assisi and Dominic of Osma. It is said that he foretold that Francis would receive the stigmata while Francis foretold his premature death. From there, he was a guest of the Basilians in Palermo where he was for over a month before preaching in Agrigento for over a month before settling in Licata. He had healed seven lepers and the ailing Archbishop of Palermo Bernardo de Castanea while in Palermo. He settled on the Sicilian island though his fame as a wonderworker caused crowds to flock to him. He also had success in converting some Jews though most Jews in Palermo came to despise him for this since he himself was once Jewish.

He wanted to convert a Cathar knight named Berenger (known also in sources as Berengarius). Tradition states that Berenger was living in incest and that the friar convinced the knight's companion to leave Berenger. Berenger became enraged and had him attacked in front of the church of Santi Filippo e Giacomo in Licata on 1 May 1220. He died of his wounds within the week of 5 May and according to tradition asked for his assassin to be pardoned while urging the faithful not to avenge his death. He was buried at Santi Filippo e Giacomo.

== Veneration ==
His sepulcher at Licata became a site of pilgrimage. The Carmelites venerated him as a saint since at least 1456 and the cult received papal approval from Pope Pius II at some stage during the latter's pontificate. In 1486, his remains were moved from a wooden casket to a silver urn before being moved to a more precious urn on 5 May 1623. In 1632 his relics were translated to the Carmelite Church, and are now housed at the Santuario della Madonna del Carmine in Catania; the ending of a plague in the Kingdom of Naples in 1656, was attributed to his intercession. Since 4 May 1626, he has been known as the patron saint for Palermo.

Daniel Papebroch sets no great value on any of the three different acts or relations of his martyrdom, but gives long accounts of miracles attributed to his intercession since his death, and of the great veneration which is paid to him in Sicily, especially at Licata and Palermo.

As he and Albert of Trapani were the first two saints in the order to have a cult, they are frequently found in medieval Carmelite iconography alongside the Virgin Mary. In the Carmelite church of Santa Maria del Carmelo in Traspontina in Rome, there is a chapel dedicated to St. Angelus with an altarpiece by Giovanni Battista Ricci.

== See also ==
- Hebrew Catholics
