= Olivio Sòzzi =

Italian painter

Olivio Sòzzi or Sozzi (1696 in Palermo – 1765 in Spaccaforno) was an Italian painter, active in Sicily during the Rococo period.

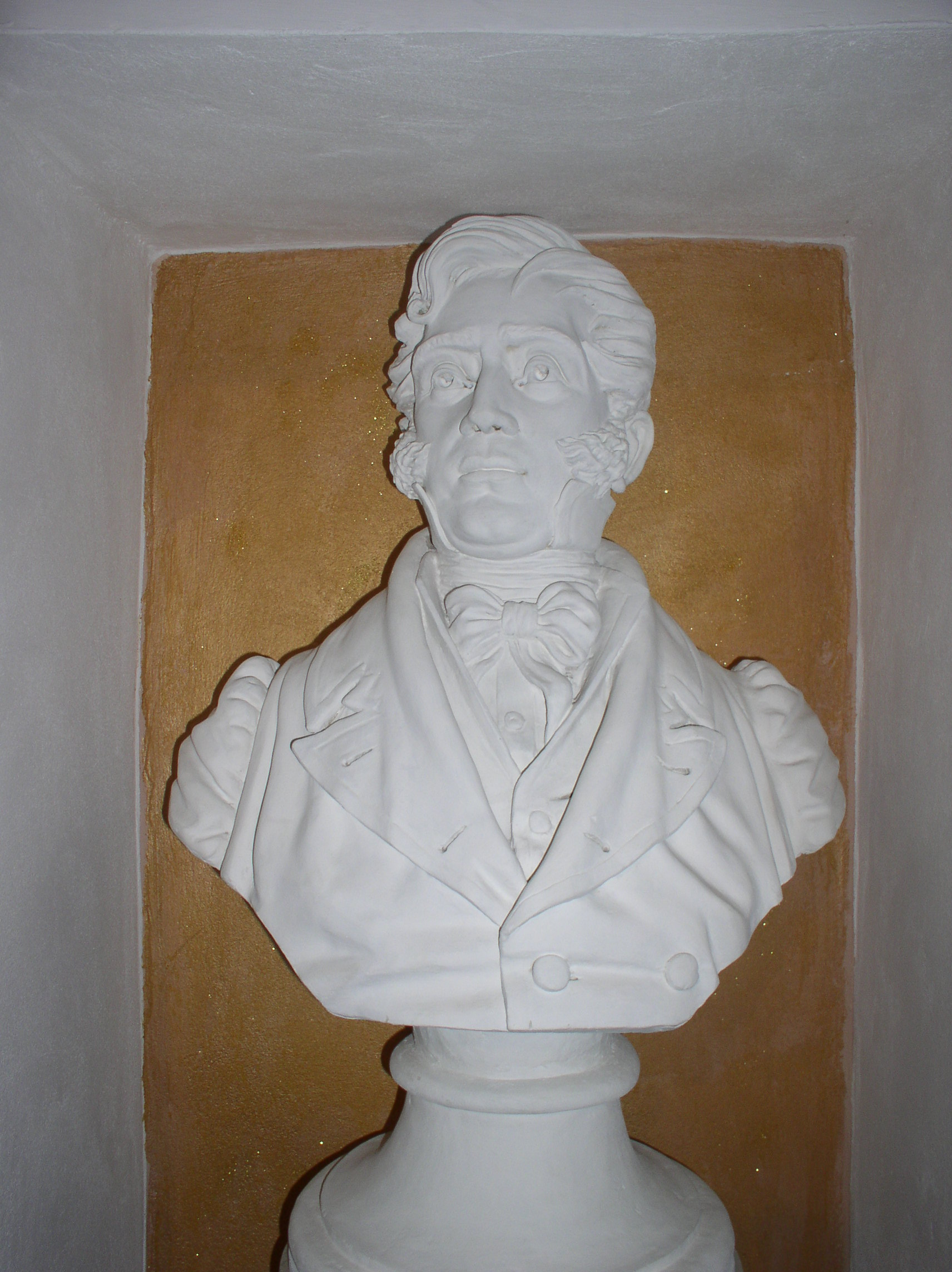
Bust of Sozzi, Santa Maria at Spaccaforno

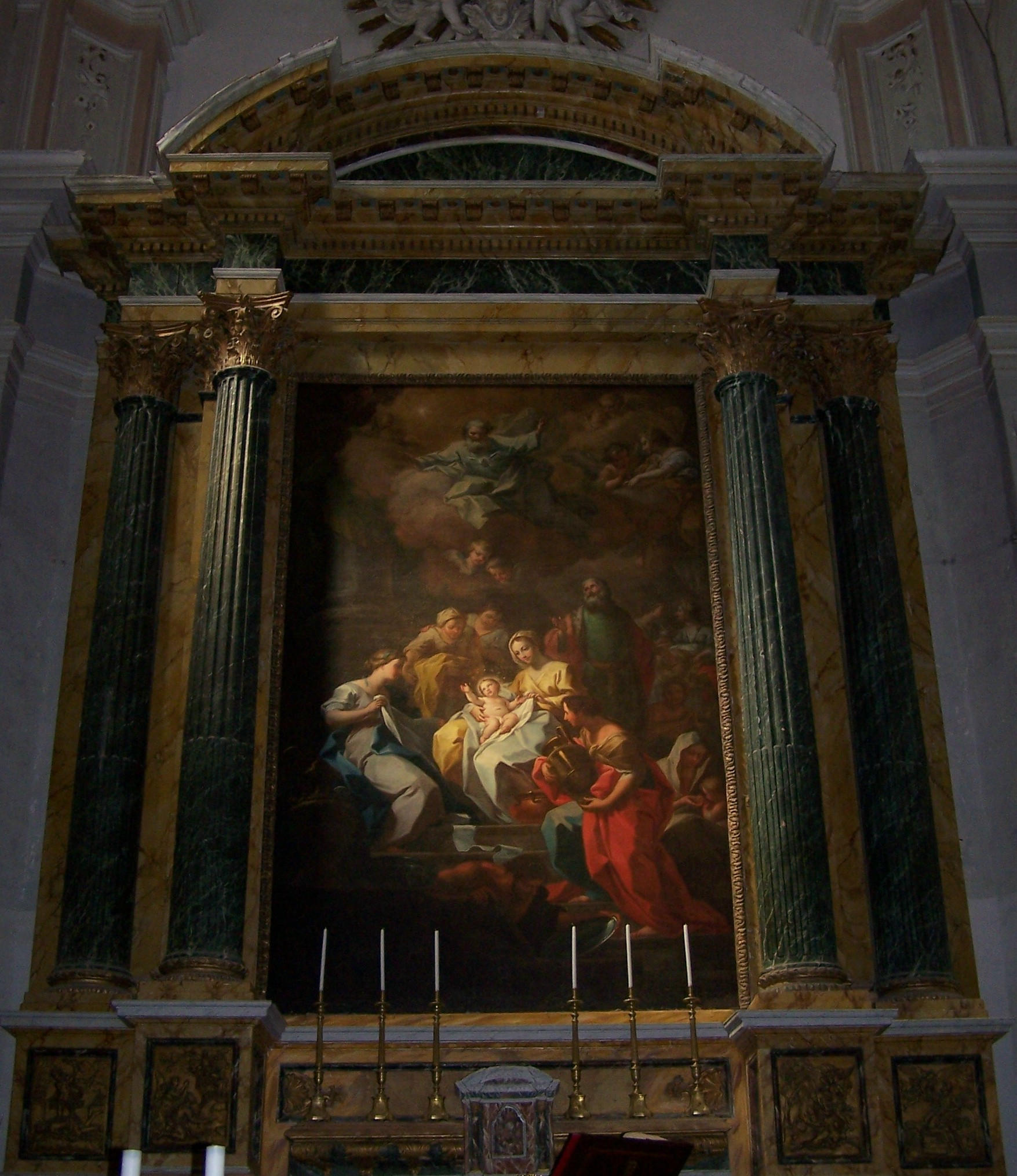
Nativity, circa 1760, Santa Maria della Stella, Militello in Val di Catania

== Biography ==
He obtained his first training in the local studio of Filippo Tancredi, he then moved in 1729 along with Gaspare Serenario to Rome to work with Sebastiano Conca. He befriended Corrado Giaquinto. He returned to Palermo in 1740, and moved to Catania in 1750. He was very prolific in Sicily, painting sacred subjects in oil and fresco in numerous churches and monasteries.

A survey from 1855, listed the following works in Catania: a large painting for the library of the University of Catania; the fresco of the dome of the church of the Jesuits; two paintings (Crucifixion and a Sant'Andrea Avellino) in the Church of the Ogninella (now deconsecrated); four sibyls in the house of the Baron Toscano, then part of the hospital of Santa Marta; a St Elia for the church of the Carmine; a Crucifixion for the church of San Gaetano; three canvases for the church of the Santissima Trinita, including a Baptism of Christ, a portrait of Cavaliere Conca, a St Benedict, a Virgin and Magdalen at Crucifixion; and for the Monastery of Santa Chiara, an Immaculate Conception.

In his later years, he worked in the southwest of the island, decorating the church of San Sebastiano, Melilli (1752), and the Basilica of Santa Maria Maggiore in Ispica (or Spaccaforno) (1763), near Ragusa. He died from a risk faced by fresco painters of ceilings, falling from a scaffold built to decorate a chapel ceiling in the Basilica at Ispica.

Among his pupils was Sebastiano Lo Monaco. Sozzi's daughter married the painter Vito D'Anna of Palermo; the latter was helping him in his last work at Ispica. His works can be found in Agrigento, Catania, Messina, Siracusa, Trapani, Palermo, and Ragusa.
