= VFA-211 =

Strike Fighter Squadron 211
- Founded: 1 May 1945; 80 years ago
- Allegiance: United States
- Branch: United States Navy
- Type: Fighter/Attack
- Role: Close air support Air interdiction Aerial reconnaissance
- Part of: Carrier Air Wing Eleven
- Garrison/HQ: NAS Oceana
- Nickname: "Fighting Checkmates"
- Mascot: Brutus
- Engagements: Korean War; Vietnam War; Operation Earnest Will; Operation Southern Watch; Iraq War; Operation Enduring Freedom; Operation Inherent Resolve; Operation Prosperity Guardian; Operation Poseidon Archer

Commanders
- Current commander: CDR Sean Stuart

Aircraft flown
- Attack: SBW Helldiver; AD-1/A-1 Skyraider
- Fighter: F4U Corsair; F9F Panther; F9F Cougar; FJ-1 Fury; FJ-3M Fury; F3H Demon; F-11F Tiger; F-8 Crusader; F-14 Tomcat; F/A-18F Super Hornet; F/A-18E Super Hornet

Strike Fighter Squadron 211 (VFA-211), nicknamed the "Fighting Checkmates", is an aviation unit of the United States Navy established in 1945. The squadron is based at Naval Air Station Oceana and is equipped with the Boeing F/A-18E Super Hornet.

== Insignia and nickname ==
The squadron insignia depicts a character known as "Brutus" holding a rocket, from the original logo for VB-74. Eleven stars are arranged in groups of seven and four to mark the squadron's numerical designation, "SEVEN FOUR". The shield recalls the squadron's sixteen-year association with the F-8 Crusader. By tradition, the "Brutus" mascot is painted on an aircraft whenever the Fighting Checkmates spend Christmas away from home. The squadron's radio call sign is "Nickel."

== History ==
Three U.S. Navy squadrons have been designated VF-211. The first was established in 1948 and disestablished in 1949. The second VF-211 was established in 1955 and later redesignated VF-24 in 1959. The third VF-211 was established as VB-74 in 1945, eventually became VFA-211, and is the subject of this article.

=== 1940s ===
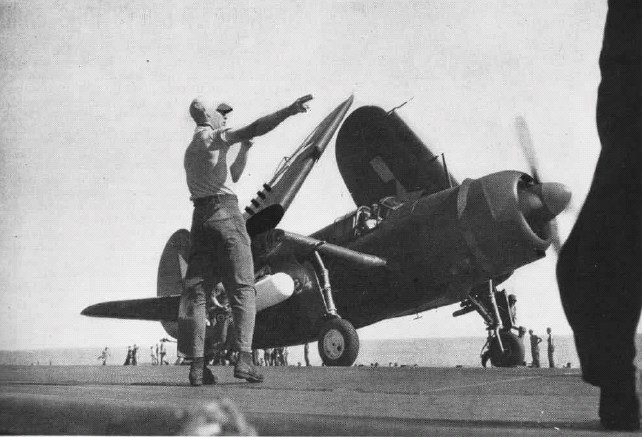
VB-74 SB2C-4E on USS Midway in 1945

Bombing Squadron Seventy Four (VB-74) was established on 1 May 1945 at NAAF Otis Field, Massachusetts. Their first aircraft was the SBW-4E Helldiver. The squadron soon moved to East Field, NAS Norfolk and deployed on USS Midway on 31 October 31 1945. In 1946 the squadron was redesignated Attack Squadron 1B (VA-1B) and began transition to the AD-1 Skyraider. Two years later the squadron transitioned to AD-2 Skyraider and was redesignated Attack Squadron Twenty Four (VA-24) on 1 September 1948. Skyraider aircraft were soon grounded due to engine problems and VA-24 transitioned to the F4U Corsair six weeks before deploying with USS Coral Sea. After the deployment the squadron moved to NAS Oceana and on December 1, 1949 the VA-24 was redesignated Fighter Squadron Twenty Four (VF-24).

=== 1950s ===
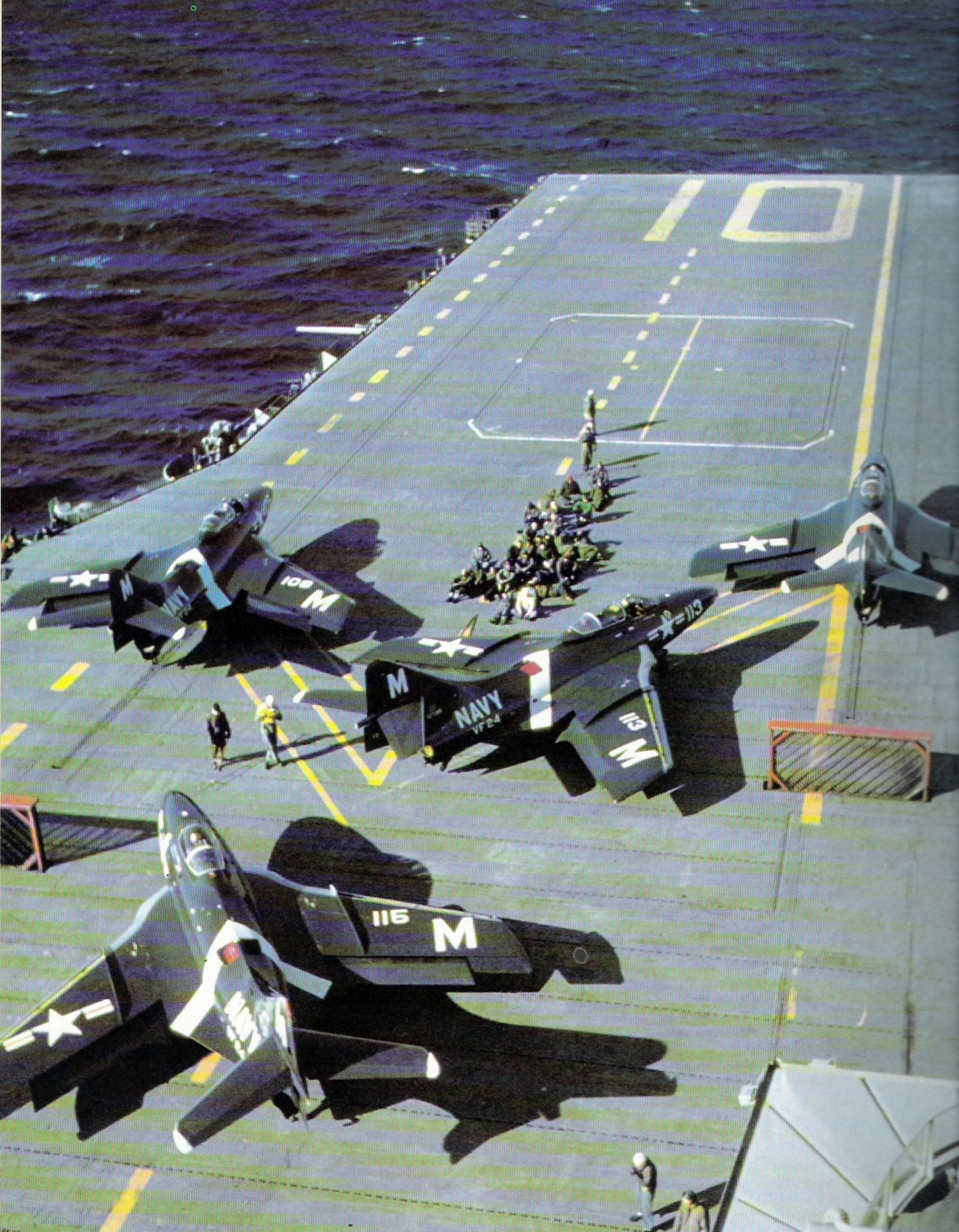
VF-24 F9F-6s on USS Yorktown in 1953

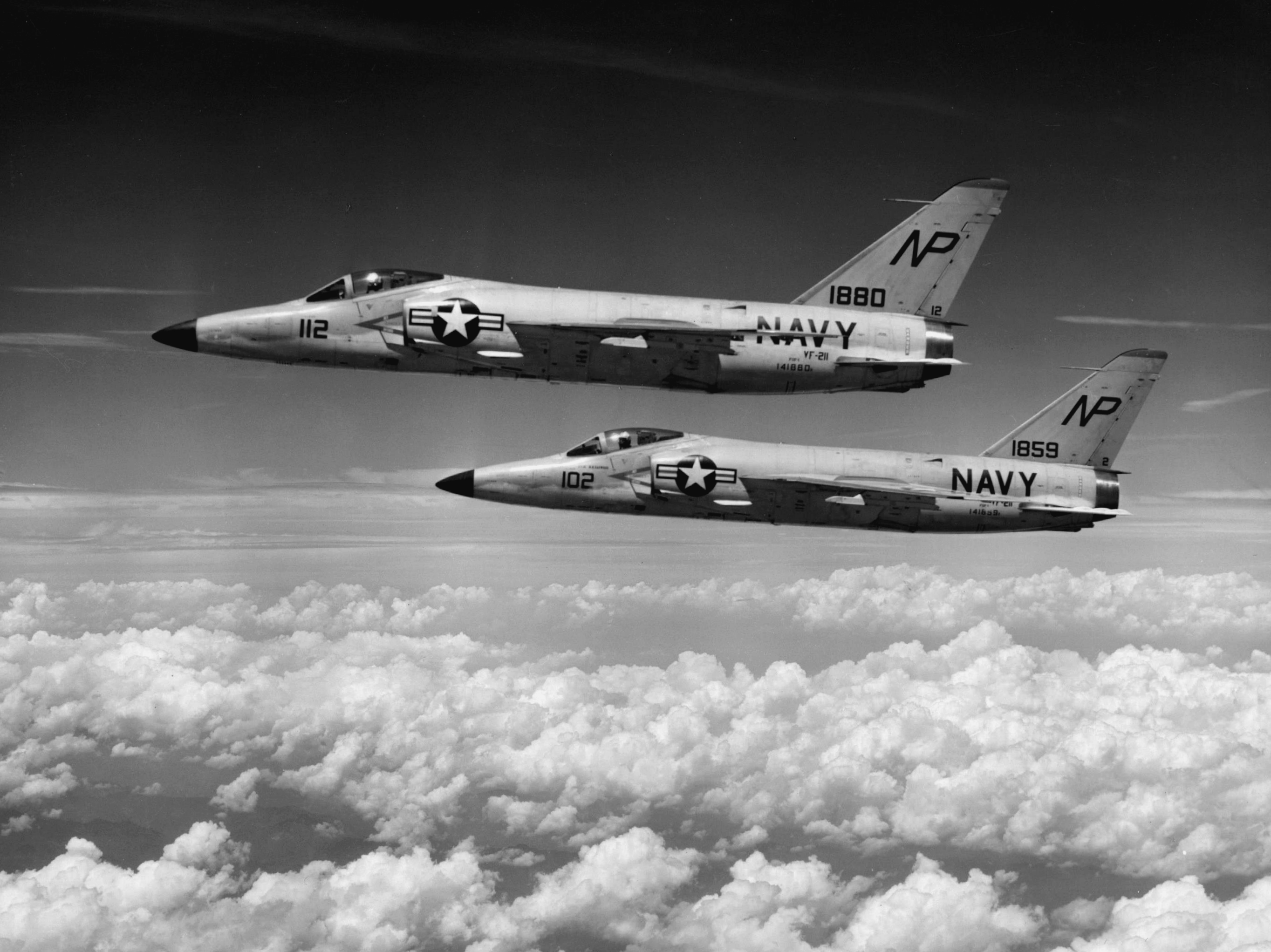
VF-211 F-11Fs in 1959

VF-24 moved to NAS Alameda and made two back-to-back deployment in support of the Korean War aboard USS Boxer and USS Valley Forge, bombing enemy emplacements, rail yards, bridges, warehouses and airfields.

Following their second deployment, VF-24 relocated to NALF Santa Rosa, California, and transitioned to the F9F-2 Panther, the squadron's first jet fighter. In February 1952, VF-24 deployed once again with USS Boxer to Korea for their third combat tour, which included a strike on Pyongyang on August 29. Upon their return home, VF-24 moved to NAS Alameda.

During the rest of the 1950s, VF-24 flew a number of aircraft, including the FJ Fury, the FJ-3M, the F3H-2M Demon, the F-11F Tiger and the F-8 Crusader at NAS Moffett Field. On 9 March 1959, VF-24 traded air wings, insignia, and designations with the VF-211 Checkmates.

VF-211 was assigned to Carrier Air Group 21 (CVG-21) aboard USS Lexington for a Western Pacific deployment from 25 April to 3 December 1959.

=== 1960s ===
In 1961 the squadron moved to NAS Miramar, which would be its home for the next 35 years.

=== Vietnam War ===
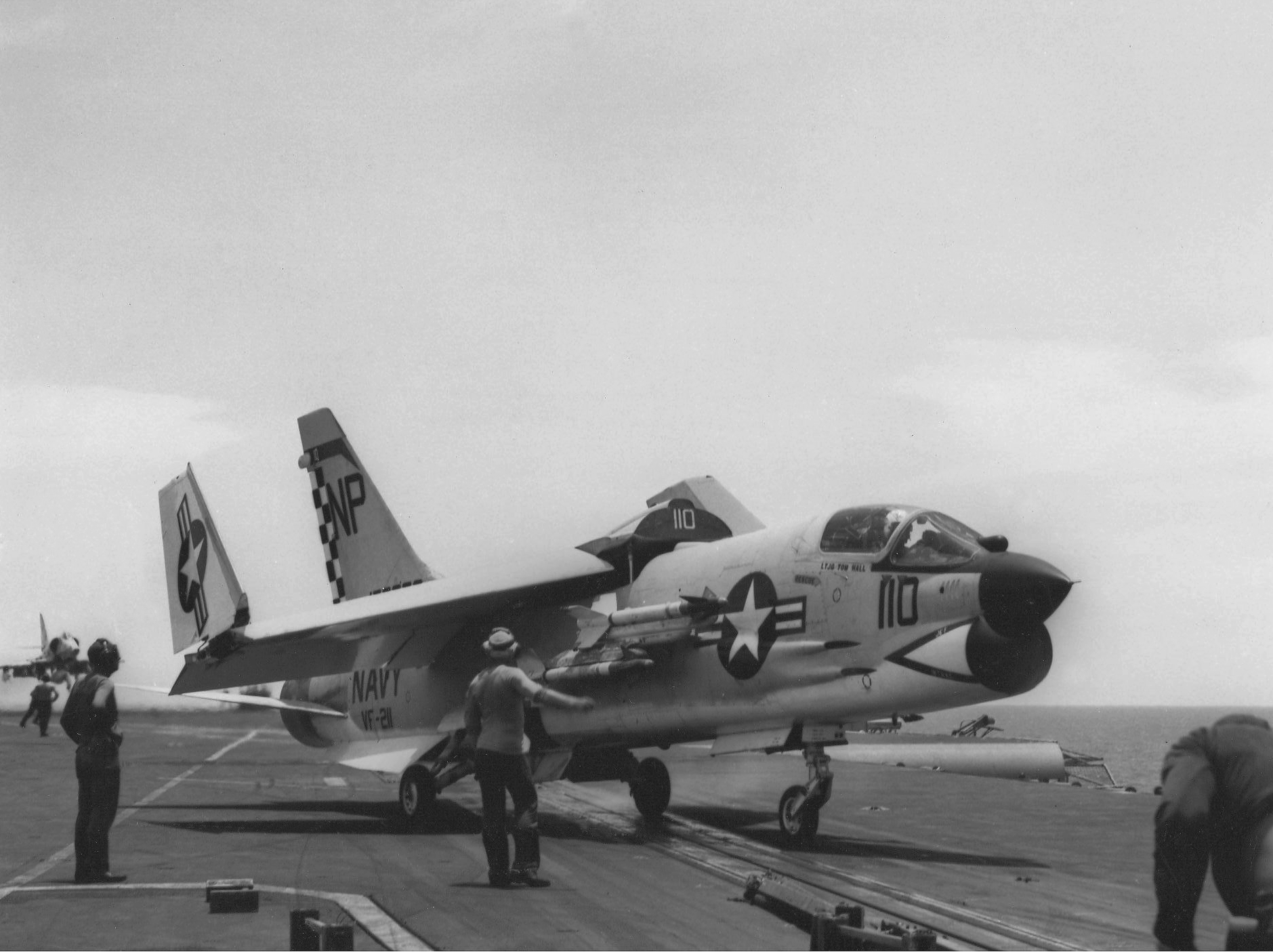
VF-211 F-8E prepares to launch from USS Bon Homme Richard in 1967

VF-211 made eight deployments during the Vietnam War.

From 21 October 1964 to 29 May 1965, VF-211 equipped with F-8Es was deployed on USS Hancock. On 21 February F-8E #150897 lost power on launch, the pilot ejected successfully and was rescued.

From 10 November 1965 to 1 August 1966, VF-211 was deployed on USS Hancock. On 24 December F-8E #150891 was lost, the pilot ejected successfully and was rescued. On 28 April F-8E #150867 hit a mountain during an air strike, the pilot LT Thomas Brown was killed in action, body not recovered. On 2 May F-8E #149169 was lost due to hydraulic failure, the pilot ejected successfully and was rescued. On 23 May F-8E #150901 was hit by antiaircraft fire, the pilot ejected successfully and was rescued. On 12 June, CDR Harold Marr shot down a Vietnam People's Air Force (VPAF) MiG-17. On 21 June, LTJG Phil Vampatella and LT Eugene Chancy each shot down a MiG-17, while F-8E #149152 was shot down by a MiG-17, the pilot LCDR Cole Black ejected successfully, was captured and released on 12 February 1973.

From 26 January to 25 August 1967, VF-211 was deployed on USS Bon Homme Richard. On 1 May LCDR M Wright shot down a VPAF MiG-17. On 19 May CDR Paul Speer and LTJG Joseph Shea each shot down a MiG-17. On 19 May F-8E #150930 was hit by a SAM-2, the pilot LTCDR Kay Russell ejected successfully, was captured and released on 4 March 1973. On 21 May F-8E #150348 was hit by antiaircraft fire, the pilot ejected successfully and was rescued. On 6 June F-8E #150303 was hit by antiaircraft fire, the pilot LTJG Thomas Hall ejected successfully, was captured and released on 4 March 1973. On 21 July LCDR Tim Hubbard shot down a MiG-17.

From 18 July 1968 to 3 March 1969, VF-211 equipped with F-8Hs was deployed on USS Hancock. On 24 August F-8H #148694 was lost due to hydraulic failure, the pilot ejected successfully and was rescued. On 15 November F-8H #147923 was lost in a ramp strike, the pilot ejected successfully and was rescued.

From 2 August 1969 to 15 April 1970, VF-211 equipped with F-8Js was deployed on USS Hancock. On 28 November F-8J #149211 was lost in a ramp strike, the pilot ejected successfully and was rescued.

From 22 October 1970 to 3 June 1971, VF-211 was deployed on USS Hancock. On 28 October F-8J #149202 was lost in a ramp strike, the pilot LT G Carloni was killed. On 5 February F-8J #149197 was lost in a ramp strike, the pilot ejected successfully and was rescued. On 16 March F-8J #150294 was lost in a ramp strike, the pilot ejected successfully and was rescued.

From 7 January to 3 October 1972, VF-211 was deployed on USS Hancock. On 23 May LT Jerry Tucker engaged a VPAF MiG-17 forcing the pilot to eject before he could fire. On 20 June F-8J #150923 was hit by antiaircraft fire, the pilot ejected successfully and was rescued.

From 8 May 1973 to 8 January 1974, VF-211 was deployed on USS Hancock. On 31 May F-8J #150677 was lost at sea, the pilot ejected successfully and was rescued. On 26 July F-8J #149186 was lost at sea, the pilot ejected successfully and was rescued.

VF-211 had eight confirmed kills in the F-8 Crusader, which earned them the reputation as "The MiG Killers."

=== 1970s ===
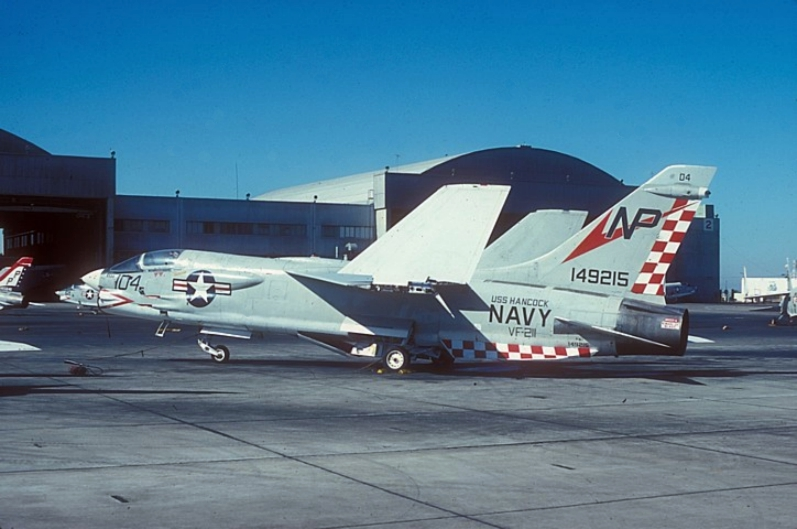
VF-211 F-8J in 1975

In 1975, VF-211 transitioned to the F-14A Tomcat, deploying with Carrier Air Wing Nine in April 1977 aboard USS Constellation. The squadron completed numerous WESTPAC deployments aboard USS Constellation during the 1970s and 1980s.

=== 1980s ===
In 1980, VF-211 added the Tactical Air Reconnaissance Pod System TARPS mission. In 1983, VF-211 changed carriers to USS Ranger. In 1985 they deployed with USS Kitty Hawk as USS Kitty Hawk was upgraded to handle F/A-18 Hornets. VF-211 would move to USS Constellation, USS Kitty Hawk and USS Nimitz in the following years. In 1986 VF-211 took part in trials of experimental water based camouflage schemes, painting at least four aircraft in temporary schemes that consisted of browns and greys, three different shades of each colour being used. In 1988, Nimitz, with VF-211 embarked, provided security off the coast of South Korea during the 1988 Olympic Games in Seoul, then in October, the squadron operated in the North Arabian Sea and Persian Gulf participating in Operation Earnest Will, the protection of reflagged Kuwaiti tankers. In April 1989, VF-211 upgraded to the F-14A+ (later designated F-14B).

=== 1990s ===
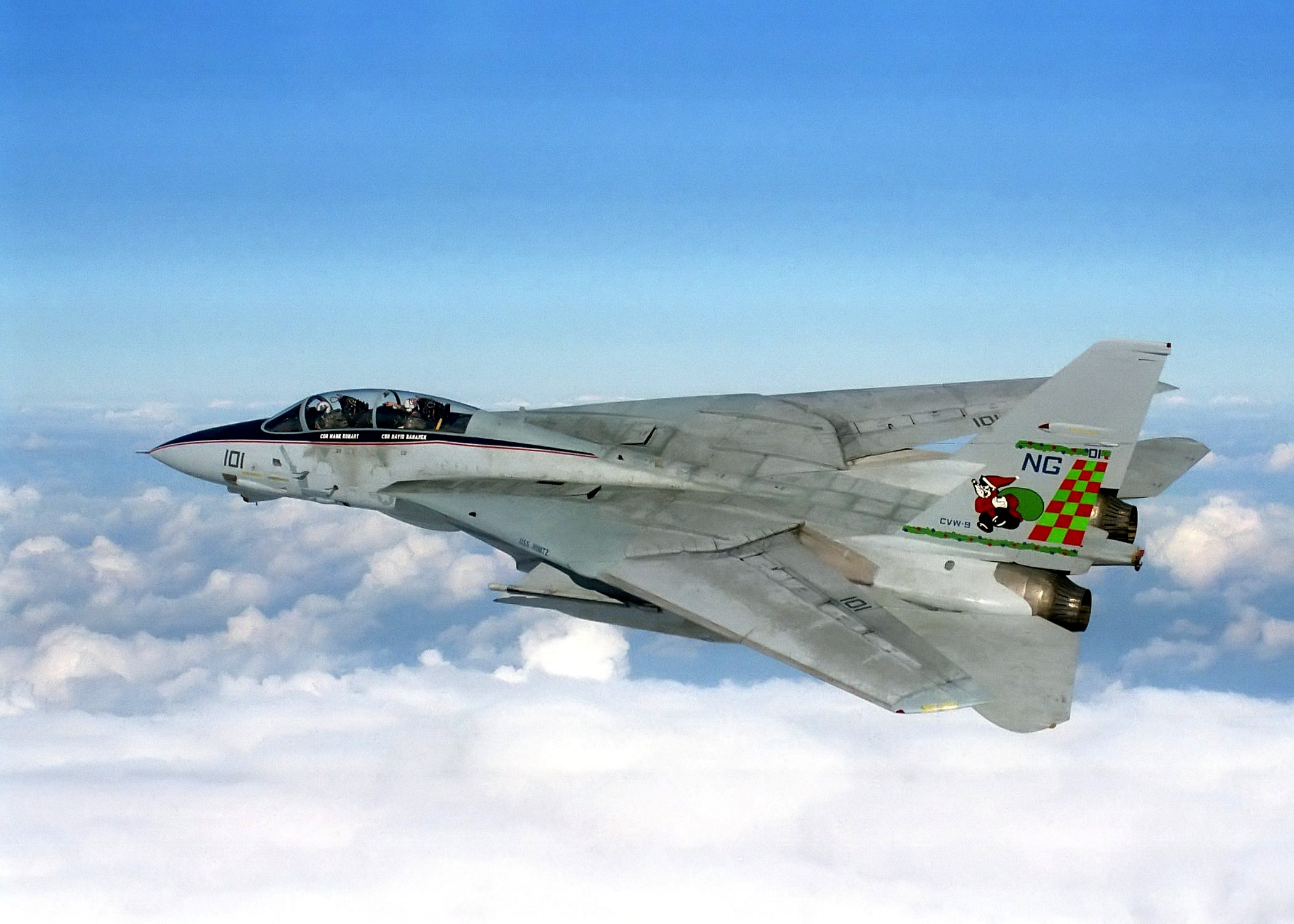
VF-211 F-14A over Iraq in 1997

In 1991, VF-211 deployed to support the aftermath of the Gulf War, providing air superiority and aerial reconnaissance imagery to coalition forces. In 1992, the squadron had to revert to the F-14A due to the decision to move all F-14Bs to Atlantic Fleet Squadrons. VF-211 would make regular deployments to the Persian Gulf in the 1990s. In 1996 VF-211 became the last west coast F-14 squadron after VF-24 was disbanded, and moved to NAS Oceana on the east coast as NAS Miramar was handed over to the US Marines. In 1996 the unit also received LANTIRN capable F-14s and went on cruise in September 1997 in support of Operation Southern Watch, spending four months in the Persian Gulf. VF-211 flew daily sorties over Iraq, enforcing the United Nations imposed no-fly zone, providing aerial reconnaissance imagery and precision strike capability.

=== 2000s ===
In 2000, VF-211 and the rest of CVW-9 joined USS John C. Stennis for a Millennium Cruise, spending four months in the Persian Gulf enforcing the no-fly zone over Iraq.

After the September 11 attacks, the squadron deployed with CVW-9, in support of Operation Enduring Freedom combat missions over Afghanistan. In early 2002, the squadron directly supported the three-week-long battle Operation Anaconda, flying 1,250 combat sorties, logging 4,200 combat hours and dropped 100,000 pounds (45,000 kg) of ordnance and was awarded the VADM "Sweetpea" Allen Precision Strike Award for 2002. On their return home to the US, they transitioned to Carrier Air Wing One aboard USS Enterprise.

In 2002 the squadron received the Commander Naval Air Force Pacific Fleet, BATTLE "E" for battle efficiency, the Commander Naval Air Force Atlantic Fleet GRAND SLAM Award for excellence in Air-to-Air employment, and the Clifton Award for the most outstanding overall performance in battle efficiency and employment. In late 2003, VF-211 deployed for their final F-14 cruise in support of Operation Iraqi Freedom, flying mostly reconnaissance, "show of force" and ground support missions.

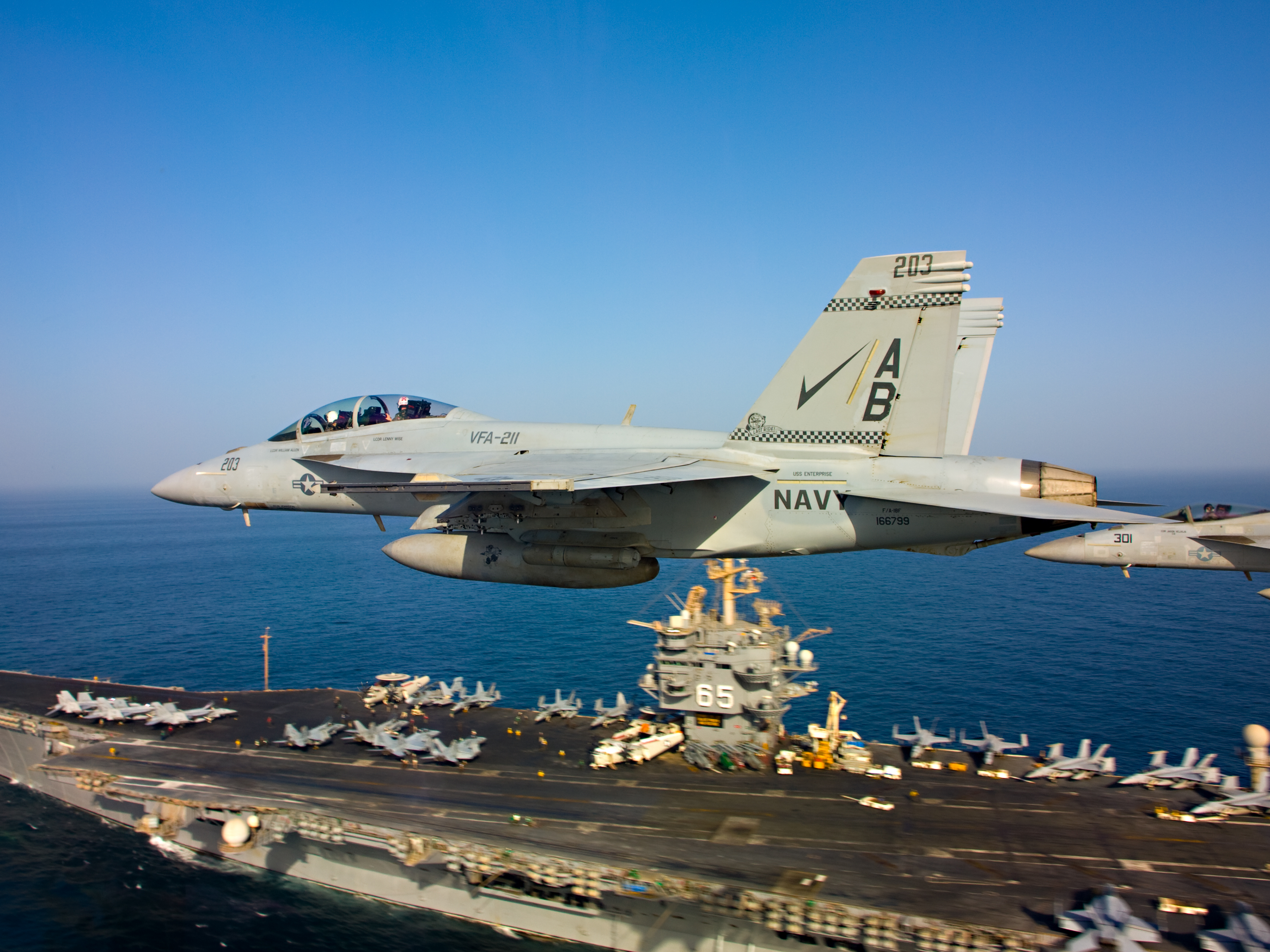
VFA-211 F/A-18F over USS Enterprise in 2012

After their return to NAS Oceana in 2004, VF-211 began transition to the F/A-18F Super Hornet and was redesignated VFA-211, becoming the first operational East Coast Super Hornet squadron. In 2006, VFA-211 deployed in support of both Operations Iraqi Freedom and Enduring Freedom. On September 8, 2006, VFA-211 F/A-18F Super Hornets expended GBU-12 and GBU-38 bombs against Taliban targets near Kandahar in support of Operation Medusa. The squadron returned to NAS Oceana on 18 November 2006, after flying hundreds of combat sorties and expending dozens of precision guided weapons in support of ground forces.

In early 2008, the squadron transitioned to Block II Super Hornets, equipped with AN/APG-79 AESA radar.

=== 2010s ===
In January 2011, VFA-211 joined CVW-1 on board the USS Enterprise (CVN-65) for a deployment supporting Operation Enduring Freedom in the 5th Fleet area of responsibility.

In December 2012 USS Enterprise (CVN-65) was taken out of service and VFA-211 remained assigned to CVW-1.

=== 2020s ===
In July 2020, VFA-211 became the first strike fighter squadron to transition from the F/A-18F to the F/A-18E Super Hornet.

From December 2021 to September 2022, VFA-211 deployed onboard the USS Harry S. Truman (CVN-75) as a part of Carrier Air Wing 1, Carrier Strike Group 8. During this deployment, VFA-211 supported NATO interests via Air Policing missions in the Adriatic, Ionian, and Aegean Seas.

One of the squadron's F/A-18E Super Hornets was lost on 8 July 2022, when it was blown overboard into the Mediterranean Sea during unexpected heavy weather. The aircraft was later recovered and loaded on a Military Sealift Command ship for transport back to the United States.

VFA-211 is part of CVW-11, currently attached to the USS Theodore Roosevelt (CVN-71).

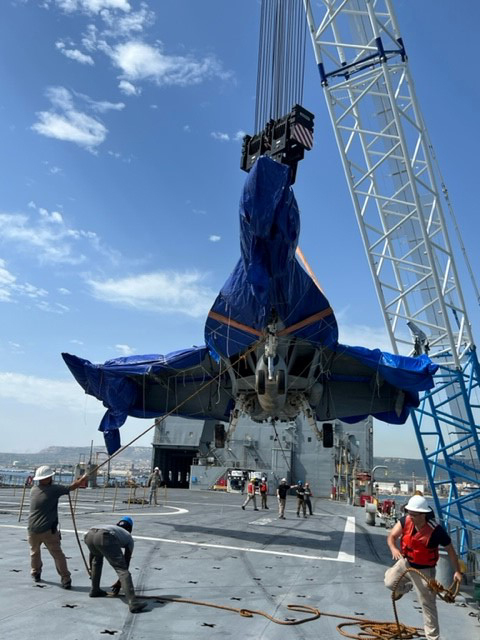
The recovered aircraft is loaded aboard USNS Mendonca (T-AKR-303) at the Port of Augusta, Sicily, 16 August 2022

== See also ==
- Naval aviation
- Modern US Navy carrier air operations
- List of United States Navy aircraft squadrons
- List of Inactive United States Navy aircraft squadrons
