= Augusta Bay (Sicily) =

Bay in Sicily, Italy

Coordinates: 37°13′N 15°14′E

The Augusta Bay is located on the east coast of Sicily, Italy, about 270 nm south-southeast of Naples. In the ancient period it was called Xiphonius portus (Ancient Greek: Ξιφώνειος λιμήν). The modern Capo di Santa Croce was called Xiphonian Promontory (Ancient Greek: τὸ τῆς Ξ̔ιφωνίας ἀκρωτήριο). Diodorus Siculus mentions that the Carthaginian fleet (263 B.C.) touched at Xiphonia on its way to Syracuse, Sicily. Stephanus of Byzantium wrote about a town there which was called Xiphonia (Ξιφωνία), but most probably he made a mistake, since no other known ancient author mentioned it.

It is the location of the Augusta Bay Port Facility which supports the Sixth Fleet of the US Navy. The facility is distributed among Porto Megarese, Porto Xifonio and Seno del Priolo.

== See also ==
- Augusta-Priolo
