= Chiesa Madre San Nicolò Vescovo, Melilli =

Roman Catholic church in Sicily, Italy

Coordinates: 37.18071°N 15.12562°E

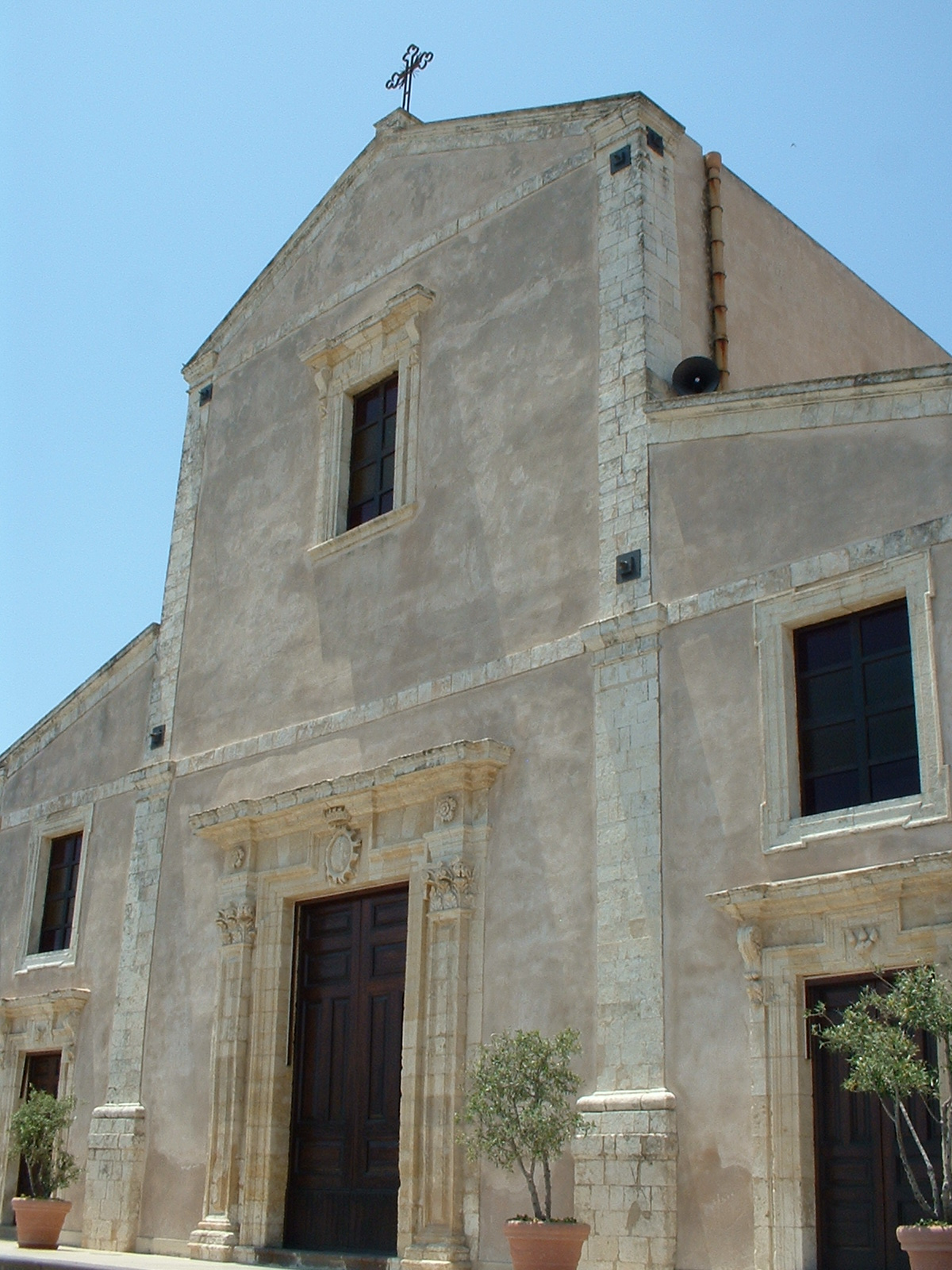
Facade of church

San Nicolò Vescovo is a Renaissance-style Roman Catholic church located on Piazza Duomo, above Via Ruggero Settimo in the town of Melilli, province of Siracusa, region of Sicily, Italy. It is the Chiesa Madre or Mother Church of the town.

== History and description ==
A church at this site, dedicated to Saint Nicholas, bishop of Myra, first patron saint of Melilli, is known since 1308-130 when the town came under the feudal rule of the Mezzamontagna family. This church is thought to be one of the churches dedicated to this saint noted in a bull of Pope Alexander III in 1169. The structure was heavily damaged by the earthquake of 10 December 1542, and again by the 1693 Sicily earthquake.

Reconstruction promptly ensued under Michele Trigilio and Girolamo, and his brother Giuseppe, Palazzotto. The first story of the campanile was rebuilt in a Romanesque-style by the brothers La Bella di Melilli, and the second story by Natale Bonaiuto. Construction lasted until 1760, and the church was reconsecrated in 1763. In the very plain East-facing facade, the architrave of the portals have sculpted elements from the coat of arms of the Moncada family and symbols of the bishopric. Above the right portal is a sculpted set of bags, reflecting the miracles of the money bags belonging to St Nicholas.

Interior to church is a ceiling fresco depicting the Triumph of the Faith (1762) by Olivio Sozzi. The main altarpiece depicts a Glory of San Nicola (1769) by Francesco Gramignani Arezzi. The chapel dedicated to the Madonna of Lourdes with an artificial grotto was built in 1819 under patronage of a local parishioner and using designs by Mario Moschetti. It replaced an altar dedicated to St Phillip Neri.

In the chapel of the Sacrament is a canvas depicting the Massacre of the Innocents Giovanni Tuccari and an altarpiece depicting the Madonna and child, St Phillip Neri with Souls in Purgatory by an unknown master. Altarpieces on the right altars include a St Cajetan and the Crucifix, a Madonna of the Rosary with St Catherine and St Dominic, and a Saints Peter and Paul by Gramignani Arezzi; and a St Francis of Paola by unknown painter. Altarpieces on the left altars include San Mauro with St Benedict and St Placidus and St Anthony of Padua gives a Sermon to the Fishes, a Virgin of the Immaculate Conception between St Charles Borromeo and St Phillip Neri by Gramignani Arezzi; and a Glory of St Joseph (1766) by Romualdo Formosa.
