= Villasmundo =

- Frazione
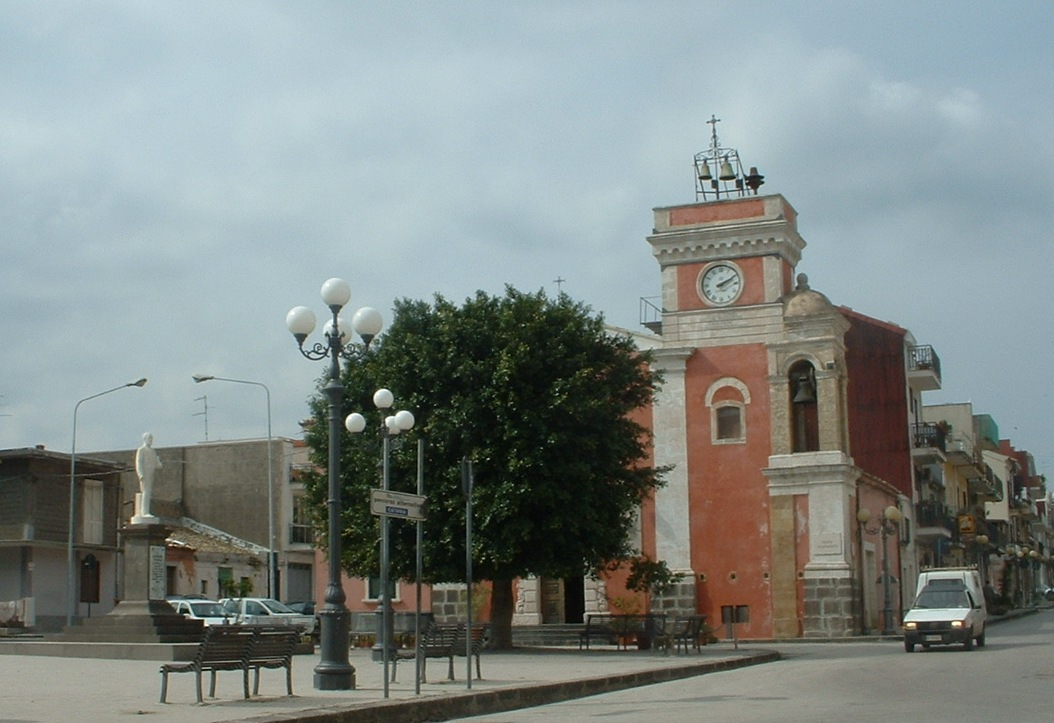
- Church of St. Michael

- Location of Villasmundo in Italy
- Coordinates: 37°15′5″N 15°5′33″E
- Country: Italy
- Region: Sicily
- Province: Syracuse (SR)
- Comune: Melilli
- Elevation: 191 m (627 ft)

Population (2011)
  - Total: 3,008
- Time zone: UTC+1 (CET)
  - Summer (DST): UTC+2 (CEST)
- Postal code: 96010
- Dialing code: (+39) 0931

Villasmundo (Sicilian: Villasmundu) is a southern Italian hamlet (frazione) of Melilli, a municipality part of the Province of Syracuse, Sicily.

Mellili is located and is 8.61 kilometres (5.35 mi) from Melilli, to which it belongs.

It has a population of 3,008.
