= VF-24 =

Fighter Squadron 24
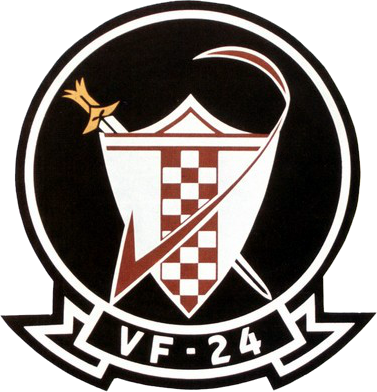
- Active: June 1955–31 August 1996
- Country: United States
- Branch: Navy
- Nickname: Red Checkertails
- Aircraft: FJ-3 Fury (1955–1957); F-8 Crusader (1957–1975); F-14 Tomcat (1975–1996)

Fighter Squadron 24 (VF-24), called the Fighting Renegades was a fighter squadron of the United States Navy. Originally established as Fighter Squadron 211 in June 1955, it was redesignated VF-24 on 9 March 1959 and disestablished on 31 August 1996.

== Background ==
VF-211 was established in June 1955 at NAS Moffett Field. The unit flew the FJ-3 Fury aboard the USS Bon Homme Richard. The squadron transitioned to the F8U Crusader in 1957.

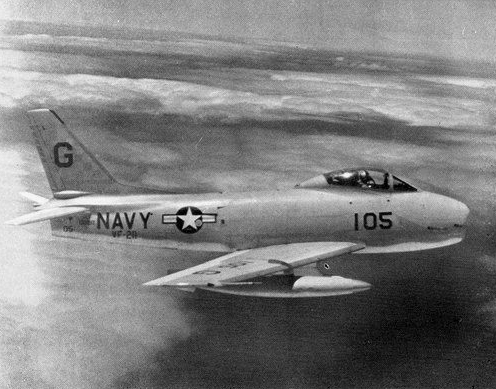
VF-211 FJ-3M c.1956

== History ==
VF-24 made deployments to the Western Pacific aboard USS Midway, USS Bon Homme Richard and USS Hancock from 1959 to 1975. While on duty, the squadron earned the Presidential Unit Citation, Navy Unit Commendation (2 awards), Meritorious Unit Commendation (5 awards), Battle Efficiency Award (1972), Armed Forces Expeditionary Medal (3 awards), and Republic of Vietnam Campaign Medal.

=== Vietnam War ===
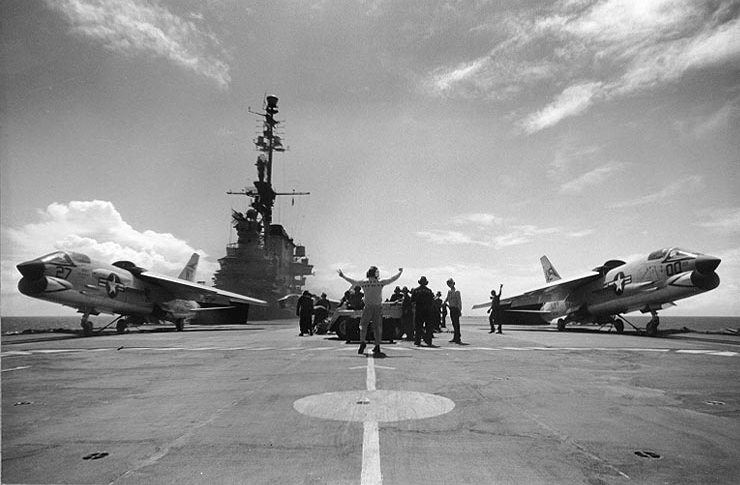
VF-24 F-8E CAG bird on USS Midway in 1963

While deployed aboard Bon Homme Richard (Carrier Air Wing 21), Lieutenant Commander Bobby C. Lee and Lieutenant Phillip R. Wood became the first VF-24 pilots to shoot down MiG aircraft over North Vietnam on 19 May 1967. The MiGs were downed with AIM-9 Sidewinder air-to-air missiles. Then on 21 July 1967, Commander Marion H. Issacks (XO) and Lieutenant Commander Robert L. Kirkwood made the 3rd and 4th MiG kills for their Squadron with 20 mm guns and Sidewinder missiles. VF-24 became one of the Navy's first "Ace" squadrons.

=== 1970s ===
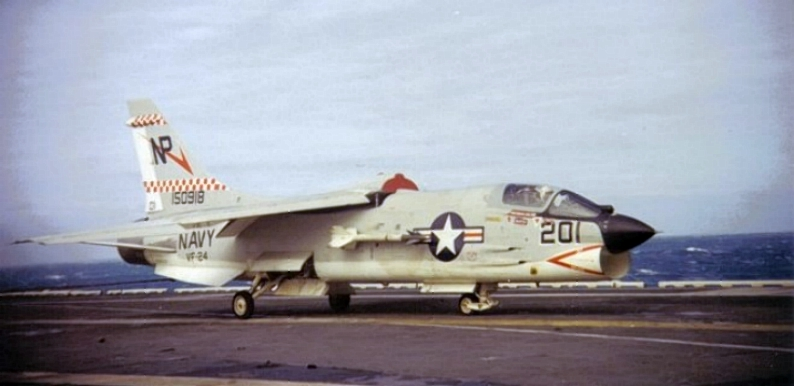
VF-24 F-8J landing on USS Hancock in the early 1970s.

VF-24 made its last F-8 Crusader cruise aboard USS Hancock in 1975. Upon return to San Diego the Squadron transitioned to the F-14A Tomcat and received their first aircraft on 9 December 1975. VF-24 then changed the squadron name to "Red Checkertails". During the rest of the 1970s and early 1990s, VF-24 deployed to the Western Pacific with USS Constellation. VF-24 won several awards: the Admiral Joseph Clifton Award, the Battle Efficiency “E”, the CNO Aviation Safety Award, and two Sea Service Deployment Awards. The Squadron clean record was completed with six years and 22.000 flight hours without an accident.

=== 1980s ===
Further records were made in 1980s. In 1983, VF-24 along with Carrier Air Wing Nine, was assigned to the USS Ranger as part of Battle Group Echo. The first deployment by Central Americas operations and a WESTPAC which included 121 concurrent days of Indian Ocean Operations, the longest of any conventional powered aircraft carrier to date. The move to USS Ranger was because the Constellation had F/A-18 Hornet capability added and the Ranger cruise was nicknamed "DeathCruise '83/'84" due to the loss of 11 crewmen. In August 1984, VF-24 and its airwing began workups with the USS Kitty Hawk with another WESTPAC and Indian Ocean cruise in July 1985.

In April 1986, VF-24 was called upon to execute Operation Coyote which involved positioning four fully mission capable F-14s, accompanying aircrew and over 150 maintenance personnel and necessary spare parts over 3,300 km (2,000 mi) away within 46 hours. From the time of execute order to go, aircraft were on deck in Adak, Alaska, in less than 30 hours. This fast paced, strategically significant mission continued for seven days, despite limited command and control assets and an extremely difficult environment at Adak. Mission intercepts, employing innovative planning and tactics, of Soviet reconnaissance aircraft were well beyond expected range and were determined to be an overwhelming success. In October 1986, VF-24 surpassed the 3 years foreign object damage (FOD) free mark; an accomplishment no other F-14 fighter squadron matched. VF-24 deployed in January 1987, aboard USS Kitty Hawk for a six-month around-the-world cruise. The Fighting Renegades were awarded the 1986 CNO Aviation Safety Award, completed over 20,500 mishap free flight hours, achieved a record setting 97 consecutive days Full Mission Capable aircraft readiness, initiated air-to-air banner gunnery launches from the deck of USS Kitty Hawk and completed its 3rd consecutive FOD free cruise. Upon returning to NAS Miramar, VF-24 was again selected to deploy to Adak, Alaska, for their second Operation Coyote mission. VF-24 was awarded a Meritorious Unit Commendation and Navy Expeditionary Medal for the 1987 deployment.

VF-24 was busy in 1988 as they spent 70% of the year deployed and had joined USS Nimitz with the rest of the airwing. They deployed to the northern and western Pacific and the Indian Ocean and provided security for the 1988 Summer Olympics in Seoul during Operation Olympic Presence as well as doing exercises with Midway and the Singapore, Malaysian and Thailand Air forces. That October, Nimitz, with VF-24 embarked, participated in Operation Earnest Will, the escorting of reflagged Kuwaiti tankers through the Persian Gulf. 1988 was another year where VF-24 received a CNO Aviation Safety Award. Another cruise began in 1989 with the Nimitz through the Bering Strait. Upon their arrival in San Diego in August they began the transition to the F-14B. VF-24 was one of the first Pacific Fleet Fighter Squadrons to do so.

=== 1990s ===
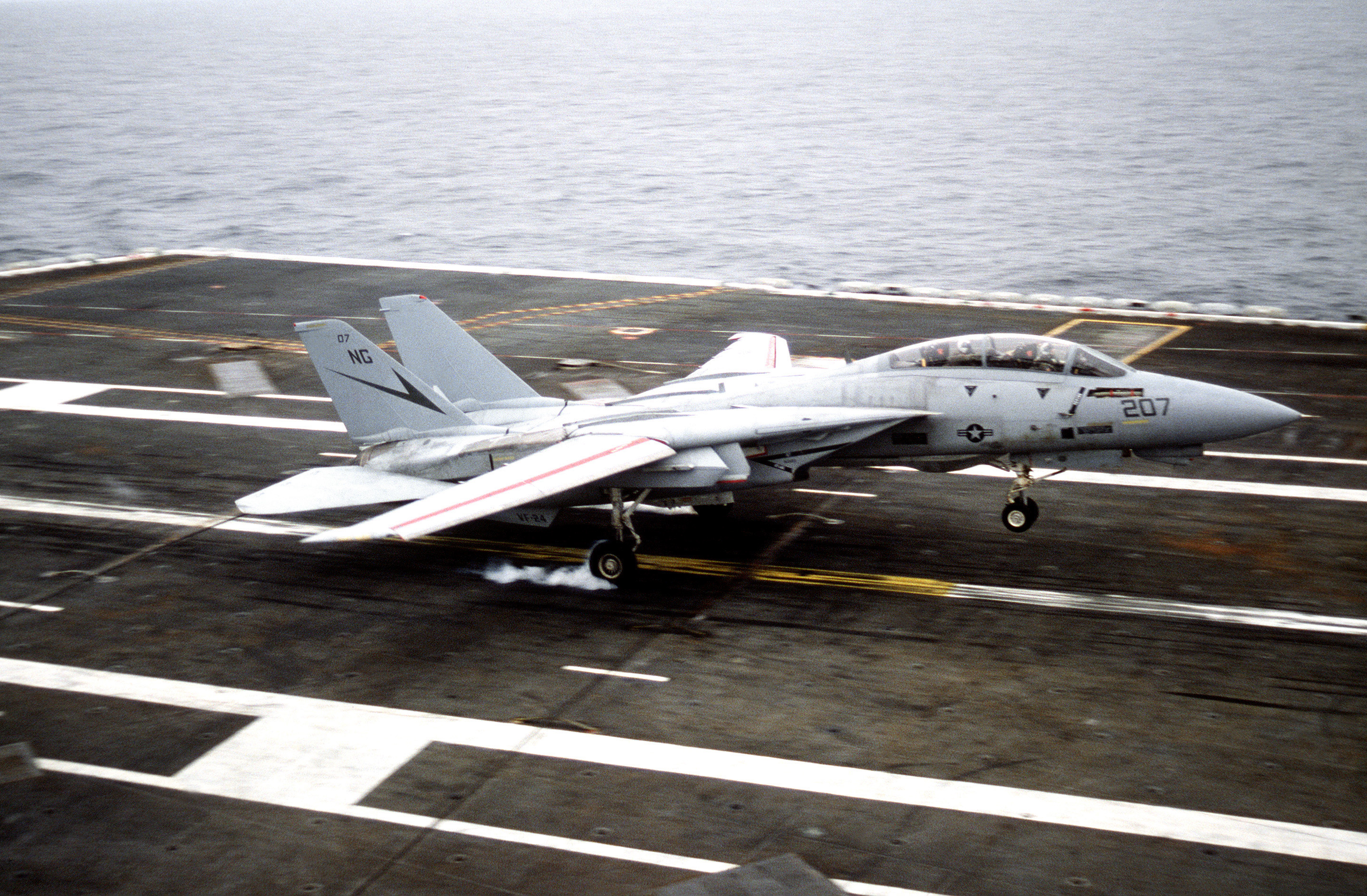
VF-24 F-14A lands on the USS Nimitz in 1992. Note that the refuel probe cover is gone

One year later, VF-24 made history as the first F-14 squadron to drop air-to-ground ordnance at NAS Fallon during Integrated Air Wing Training. In November 1990, they began preparations for deployment and headed for the Persian Gulf in February 1991 and were one of two west coast squadrons to deploy the F-14B. In April 1991, VF-24 began flying missions in support of Operation Provide Comfort over Iraq and Kuwait and participated in detachments to Bahrain and the United Arab Emirates. In June of the same year, VF-24 had completed nine years and 36.000 flight hours without incident. They returned to Miramar in August the same year.

VF-24 began an aggressive turnaround cycle by participating in RED FLAG exercise at Nellis AFB in February 1992. VF-24 flew sorties as "red air" against a coordinated multinational strike team. As with all Navy F-14 squadrons, VF-24 were Bombcat qualified, carrying "dumb" munitions such as Mk-80 series bombs, Mk-20 Rockeye cluster munitions, air laid sea mines, TALD surface-to-air missile decoys and practice bombs. Laser-guided bombs could be carried, but had to be buddy lazed. For all its time with the F-14 Tomcat, VF-24 was teamed with VF-211 as part of Carrier Air Wing Nine. Their last cruise took place from November 1995 to May 1996, on board the USS Nimitz. VF-24 was disestablished on 31 August 1996.

== See also ==
- History of the United States Navy
- List of inactive United States Navy aircraft squadrons
- List of United States Navy aircraft squadrons
