= San Gaetano alle Grotte, Catania =

Coordinates: 37.508747579814575°N 15.088101181702104°E

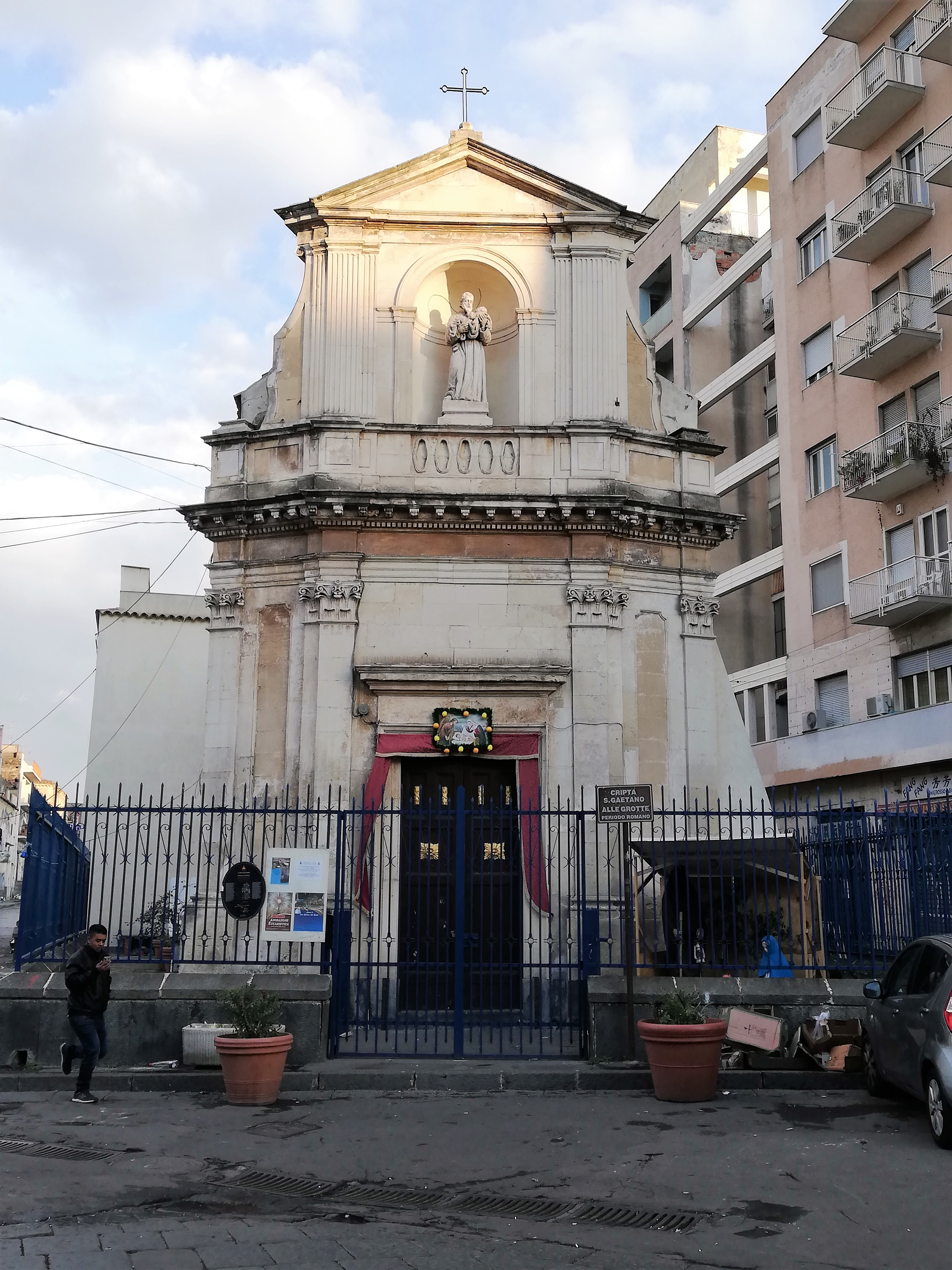
Facade of the church

San Gaetano alle Grotte is a church in Catania, region of Sicily, southern Italy. The flank of this small church faces Piazza Carlo Alberto where the minor basilica church of the Santuario della Madonna del Carmine is located.,

The substructure of the church is ancient, putatively built circa 260-300 as a chapel, perhaps a burial chapel, in a lava cave in use as a cistern, and dedicated to the Virgin Mary. In the seventh century, a church was built atop, once called Santa Maria La Grotta. In the 8th century, the Muslims either demolished or abandoned that structure. The Norman rulers, restores a church and added the large columns of the upper presbytery. The church was razed by the 1693 Sicily earthquake, and reconstruction was pursued for nearly the entire 18th century, completed only in 1801. The remaining access for the crypt was a steep narrow staircase. In 1958, the church and crypt were restored by the Carmelite friars.
