= Chicken Tonight =

Brand of sauce

- Product type: Sauce
- Current owner: Simplot (Oceania, US) Symington's LTD (United Kingdom) Zwanenberg Food Group (the Netherlands)
- Country: United States
- Introduced: 1992
- Previous owners: Unilever
- Website: https://www.chickentonight.co.uk

Chicken Tonight is a brand of sauce intended to be added to chicken pieces in a frying pan, available in flavors such as Honey & Mustard, Country French and Thai Green Curry.

== History ==
Initially launched on October 23, 1990, under Unilever's Ragú brand in the United States and Canada, it was launched in the United Kingdom under the Knorr brand in 1993, while the same year, Chicken Tonight made its way to Oceania under the Raguletto brand. As of 2025, Chicken Tonight is a standalone brand.

The associated advertising slogan is "I feel like Chicken Tonight". In one series of television ads, these words were sung by actors as they 'flapped' their arms in a movement similar to the dance "The Chicken". An advertisement for Chicken Tonight was the first in the United Kingdom to use a red button interactive service to promote the product.

The American version of the product was met with limited success; however, as of 2025, it is still sold in Australia, New Zealand, the Netherlands, and the United Kingdom. Association football player Ian Wright appeared in advertisements for the product. In 2011, Unilever sold the Ragu business and the Chicken Tonight brand (in a deal worth £30m) in the United Kingdom to Symington's, a food manufacturer in Leeds, who would drop the Knorr branding. Symington's later acquired the Oceania rights to Raguletto and Chicken Tonight; they have since been acquired by Simplot. In 2019, Unilever also sold Chicken Tonight brand in the Netherlands to Zwanenberg Food Group.

== In popular culture ==
The dance and song of the advertisement were parodied by The Simpsons family in the episode "Lady Bouvier's Lover".

A segment on an America's Funniest Home Videos episode parodied the brand as "Iguana Tonight."
