= Melilli =

- Comune
- Comune di Melilli
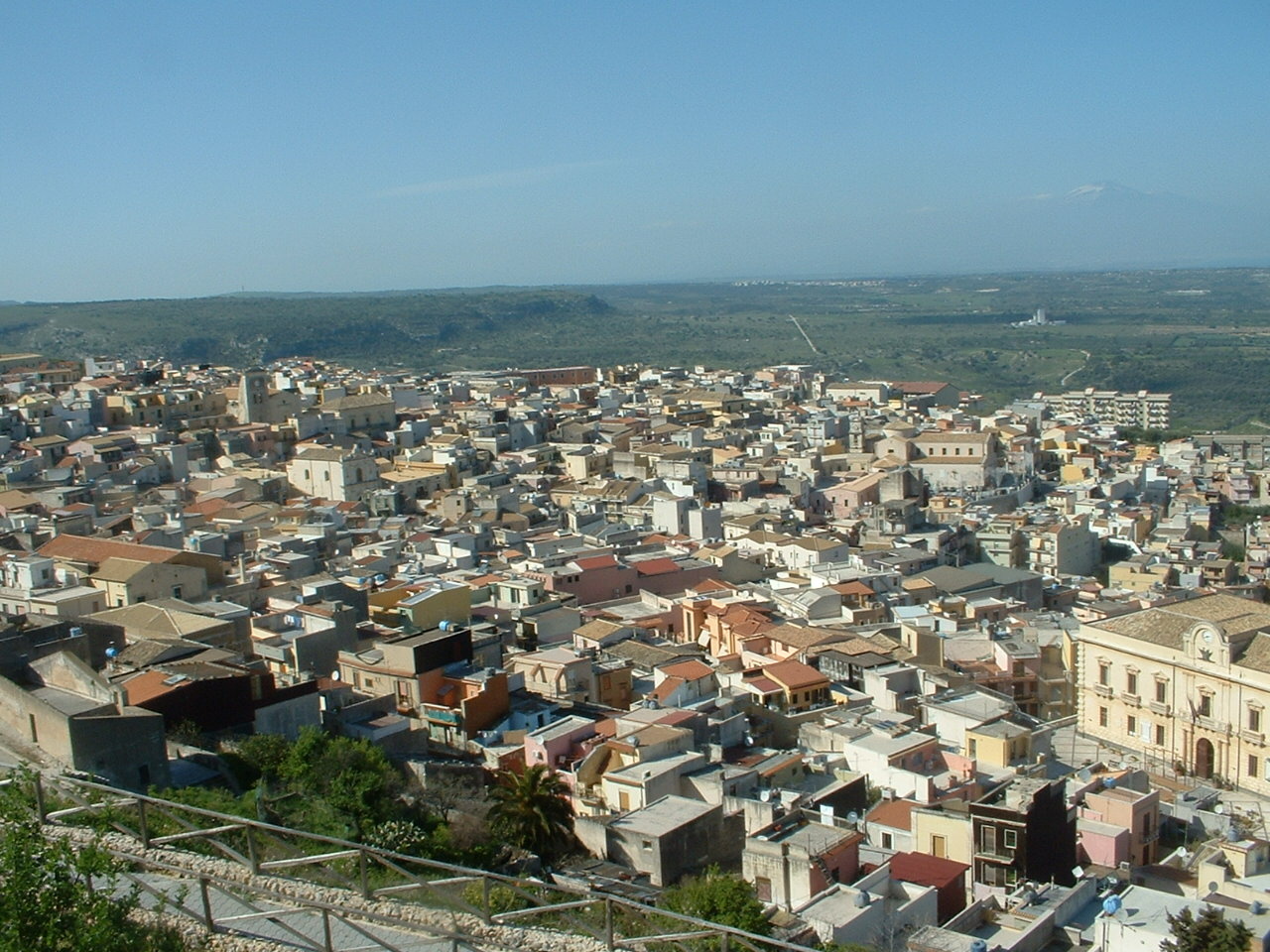

- Location within Italy Location within Sicily
- Coordinates: 37°11′N 15°7′E
- Country: Italy
- Region: Sicily
- Province: Province of Syracuse (SR)
- Frazioni: Villasmundo, Città Giardino, Marina di Melilli

Government
  - Mayor: Giuseppe Carta

Area
  - Total: 136.42 km^{2} (52.67 sq mi)
- Elevation: 310 m (1,020 ft)

Population (30 November 2017)
  - Total: 13,533
  - Density: 99.201/km^{2} (256.93/sq mi)
- Demonym: Melillesi
- Time zone: UTC+1 (CET)
  - Summer (DST): UTC+2 (CEST)
- Postal code: 96010
- Dialing code: 0931
- Patron saint: Saint Sebastian
- Saint day: 4 May
- Website: Official website

Melilli (Sicilian: Miliḍḍi) is a comune (municipality) in the Province of Syracuse, Sicily (southern Italy), located about 190 kilometres (120 mi) southeast of Palermo and about 20 kilometres (12 mi) northwestern of Syracuse.

== Geography ==
Melilli stands at about 310 metres (1,020 ft) above sea level close to the Monti Climiti chain, overlooking the Megara bay and the industrial district of Augusta-Priolo.

Melilli borders the following municipalities: Augusta, Carlentini, Priolo Gargallo, Syracuse, Sortino.

== History ==
The human presence in the area is attested since the Bronze Age. Its strategic situation between the major cities of Augusta and Syracuse has played a critical role in its growth. In the feudal age, it became a dominion of the Augusta County.

It managed to revive after two devastating quakes in 1542 and 1693. Since 1842 it has been an autonomous city.

== Main sights ==
The Chiesa Madre San Nicolò Vescovo (Mother Church of St Nicolas, Bishop of Myra), dedicated to Saint Nicholas, has a ceiling painted with the Triumph of the Faith by Olivo Sozzi.

The church of San Sebastiano, dating from the 18th century, houses various paintings by Sozzi, among which are a Coronation of Saint Sebastian and The Triumph of the Faith, and a marble altarpiece representing the Deposition of St. Bartholomew.

The church of Sant'Antonio Abate has bronze bas-reliefs on the portal by Domenico Girbino.

== Nature ==
The River Marcellino, flowing nearby, offers naturalistic spots and an old necropolis. The neighboring salt-mines of Augusta were an important economic resource as far as the end of World War II.

== Culture ==
Feasts in the town include:

- Carnival
- Christ's nativity representation (during Christmas)
- Holy week
- Feast of Saint Sebastian - 4 May (Patron Saint of the town)

== Twin city ==
- (United States) Middletown, Connecticut, USA
