= Santissima Trinità, Catania =

Roman Catholic church and former monastery in Catania, Italy

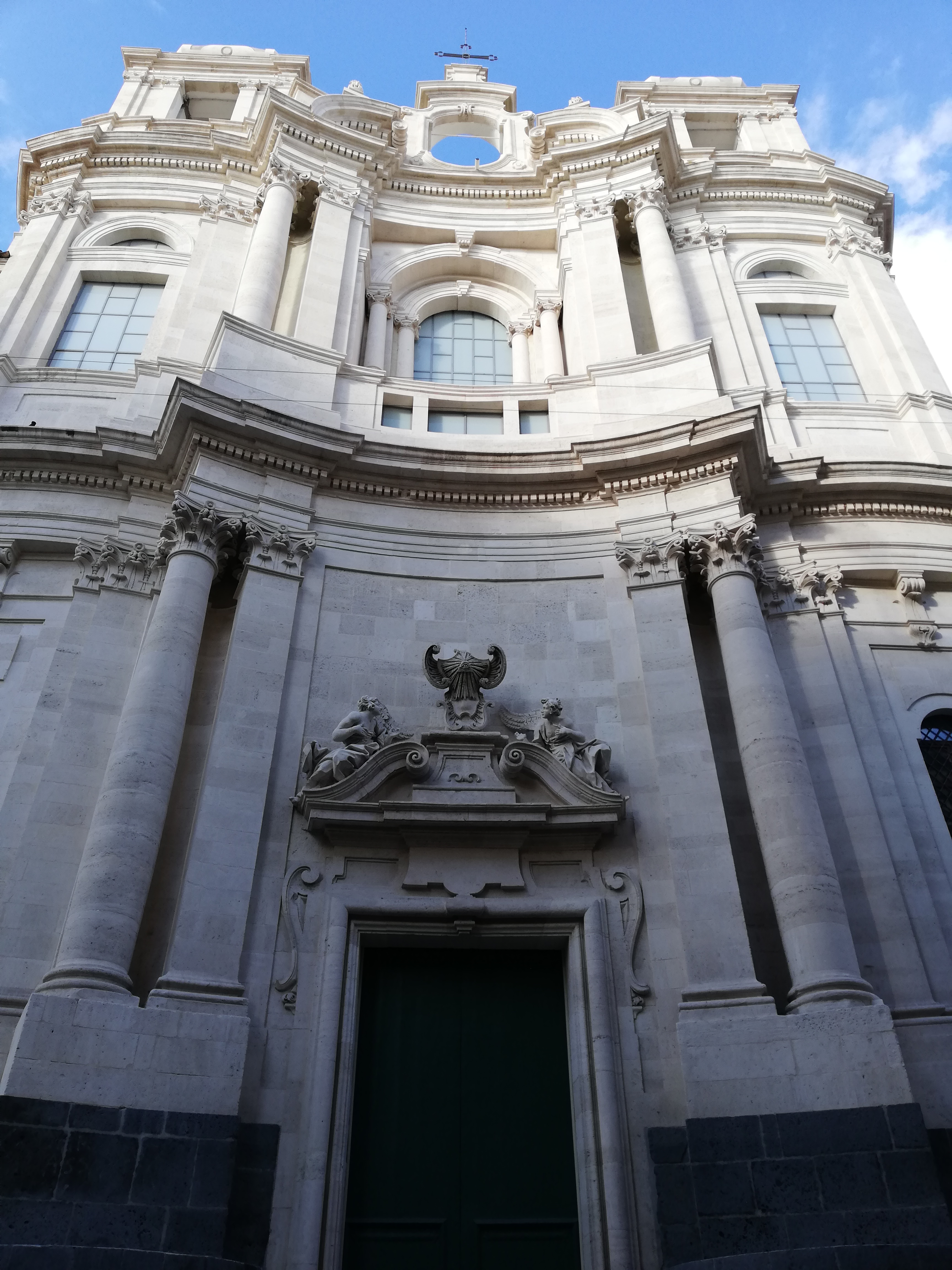
Facade of church

Santissima Trinità (Holiest Trinity) is a late-Baroque architecture, Roman Catholic church and former monastery (Badia) located on Via Vittorio Emanuele, corner of Via Santissima Trinità in the city Catania, Sicily, southern Italy. The monastery is now a science high school.

== History and description ==
The Benedictine nuns once associated with this monastery, founded in 1351 by a noblewoman Cesaria de Augusta, had initially owned a church on vico San Martino, this was united to the monastery of Portosalvo in 1554, and then to the college of the orphans two years later.

Only after the 1693 Sicily earthquake, did the nuns move here and construction of the present church began soon after, in the 18th century. The façade has a central concave protrusion, a Borromini-esque design attributed to Francesco Battaglia. The portal is preceded by a few stairs made of black lava stone. The broken stone tympanum over the entrance supports two recumbent female sculptures, gazing up to an unusual cartouche of an eye surrounded by rays, an allegory of the eye of God. Each story is flanked by a pilaster and column, both with corinthian capitals. In the center is a Serlian window. On the flanks the facade rises to towers.

The interior nave has an elliptical shape, while the apse has a rectangular layout. The interior has a number of notable altarpieces. The first altar on the right houses a Baptism of Jesus by Olivio Sozzi (a copy of the painting by Vito D'Anna for the church of Origlione in Palermo). The third altar houses a Madonna appearing to St. John the Baptist on Patmos attributed to Sebastiano Conca. The first altar on the left is a Crucifixion, while the third altar is St Benedict and the vision of the Trinity by Sozzi.
