= San Sebastiano, Melilli =

Church building in Melilli, Italy

Coordinates: 37.17770°N 15.12772°E

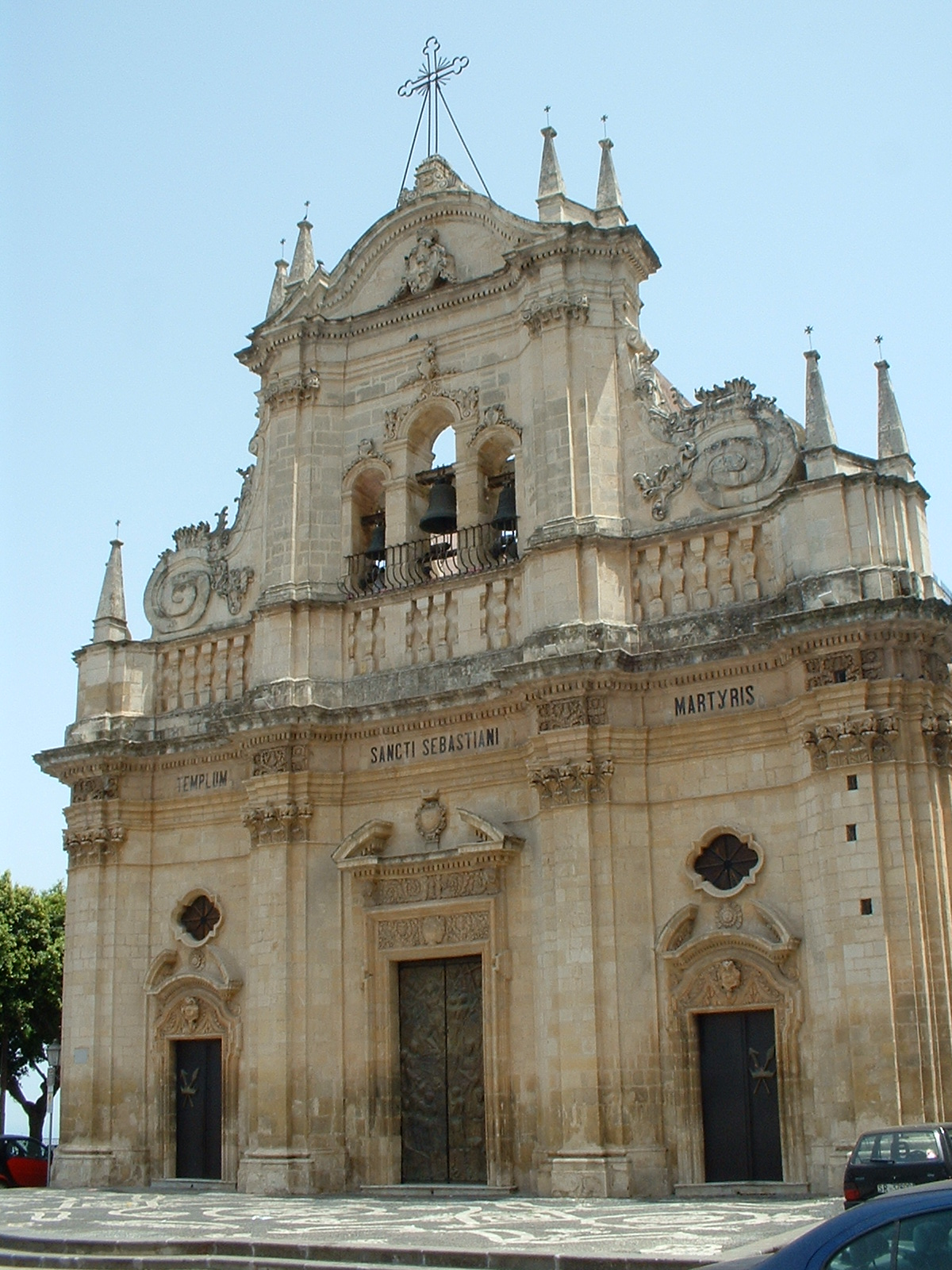
Facade of church

San Sebastiano is a Baroque-style Roman Catholic church located in the town of Melilli, province of Siracusa, region of Sicily, Italy. It is located along a hill above the town, along Via Italia, which has a scenic park and overlook from where one can look towards the industrial refineries along the Mediterranean coast near Augusta.

== History and description ==
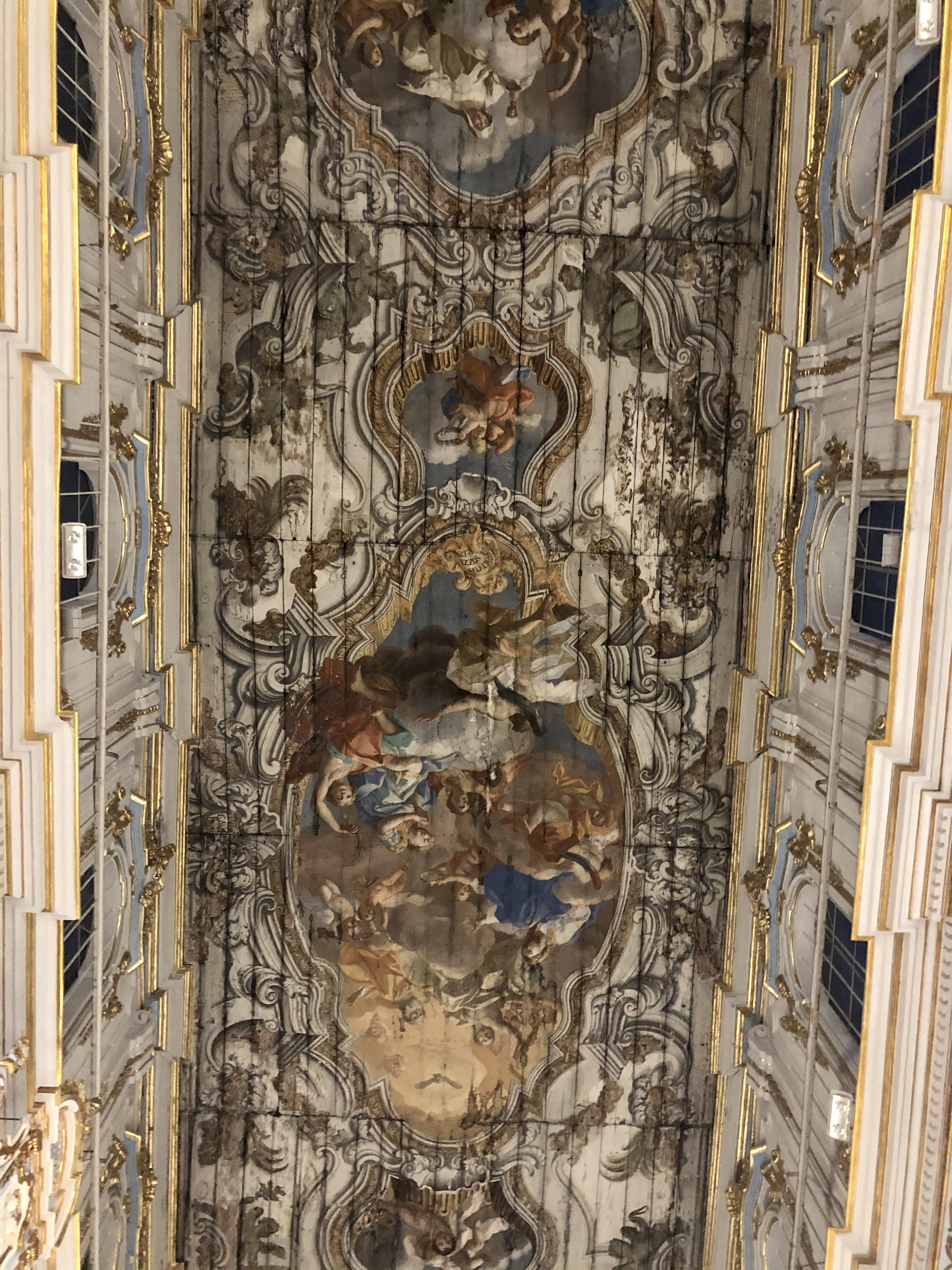
Ceiling of the church

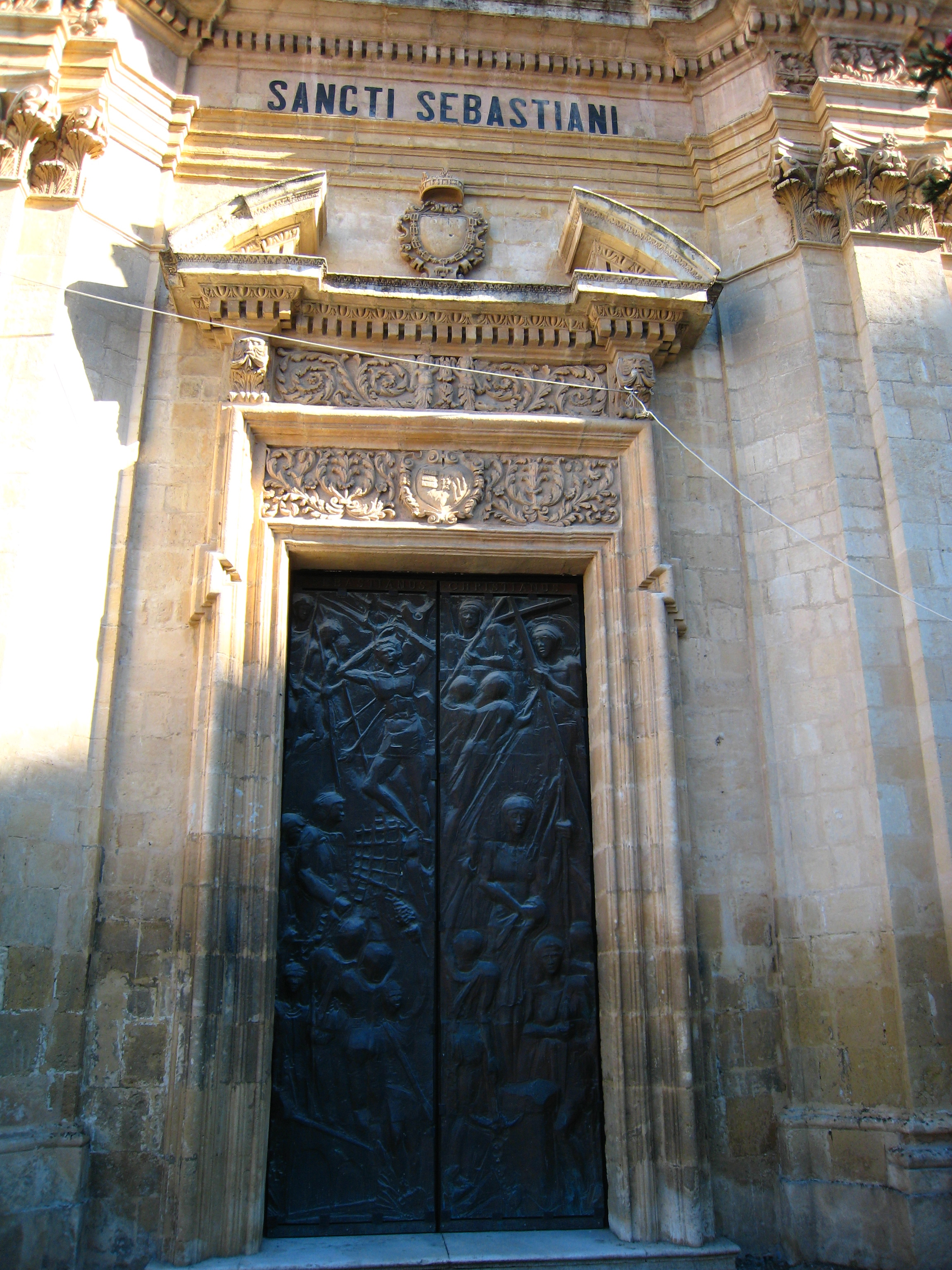
Bronze bas-relief of the central door by Girbino

A church near the present space was erected near a grotto or cave named Carcarella, where a frescoed aedicule depicted an image of St Sebastian, the titular saint. To this church, in 1414, was also translated a wood icon putatively of the Saint rescued from a shipwrecked English boat located near the bay of Stentinello. This early church had a north-facing facade, but was razed by the 1683 Sicily earthquake. Only the wooden statue of St Sebastian survived. Reconstruction began in 1695, employing the designs of Francesco Rinaldi, Francesco Pattavina, and Geronimo Palazzotto.

The facade had merely been completed at the first story, when the highly decorated upper floors were erected under the designs of Nicolò Sapia. In 1702 the surrounding loggia was erected. The bronze and wooden portal doors of the facade were designed in the 20th century by Domenico Girbino. The wooden ceiling was painted by Olivio Sozzi with a Triumph of the Faith.
