= Ragú =

Brand name for sauce products

- Product type: Pasta sauce
- Current owner: Mizkan
- Country: Rochester, New York, United States
- Introduced: 1937; 89 years ago
- Markets: Worldwide
- Previous owners: Ragu Packing Company; Unilever
- Tagline: "America's Favorite Pasta Sauce Brand"
- Website: ragu.com

Ragú (/ræˈɡuː/) is an American brand of sauces and condiments owned, in North America, by Mizkan and in the United Kingdom and Ireland by Symington's, a private-label food manufacturer.

The sister product to Ragú, known as Raguletto, is produced in Oceania and Finland. Raguletto is sold in Oceania by Simplot and in Finland by GBFoods.

== Overview ==
The Ragú brand was first sold in 1937 and in 2014 was the best selling U.S. brand of pasta sauce. Ragú was acquired by Chesebrough-Pond's, which later merged with Unilever, before its sale to Mizkan.

The Ragú pasta sauce line consists of smooth Old World Style sauces, Chunky sauces, bold Robusto! sauces, as well as organic and light pasta sauces. While most well known for selling jarred pasta sauce, Ragú also purveys a pizza sauce and an Alfredo sauce.

== Spelling ==
The brand name Ragú is spelled with an acute accent, while the Italian word ragù (an Italian sauce typically used for dressing pasta) is spelled with a grave accent.

== History ==
Ragú had its origins in Rochester, New York, in 1937. Assunta Cantisano and her husband, Giovanni, founded the Ragu Packing Company in their home in Rochester, New York, in 1937, making spaghetti sauce in their basement and selling it on their front porch. They later expanded to an entire factory. In 1969, the Ragu name was sold to Chesebrough-Pond's, which in turn was acquired by Unilever in 1987. Unilever introduced the short-lived Chicken Tonight line of simmering sauces in the early 1990s under the Ragú brand. Mizkan purchased the brand in 2014.

The facility in Rochester still manufactured products under the Cantisano name brand. Some of the original facility still exists and produces products for other labels (including Newman's Own) as private label foods. They also have a facility in Owensboro, Kentucky.

The Cantisano family left to create Cantisano Foods (now LiDestri Foods) and invented the Francesco Rinaldi brand of pasta sauce. The quotations "As I got older, I got better" and "Ciao, Francesco Rinaldi" have gained popularity since their use in commercials for Francesco Rinaldi.

In August 2020, Mizkan announced that it was removing Ragú from the Canadian market.
