= Sant'Antonio Abate, Melilli =

Church in Melilli, Italy

Coordinates: 37.17958°N 15.12342°E

Sant'Antonio Abate is a Neoclassical-style Roman Catholic parish church located on Via Mazzini #2 in the town of Melilli, province of Siracusa, region of Sicily, Italy.

== History and description ==
A church at this site with its adjacent monastery of the Order of Friars Minor (First order Franciscans) had been established by the early 15th century. The church Once had a tall bell-tower with a clock. The portal has 6 bronze bas-relief panels, depicting scenes from the life of the titular saint, sculpted by Domenico Girbino. The interior has two oval canvases of unknown authorship depicting St Benedict and St Scholastica and a Glory of St Benedict. The lateral altars have wooden sculptures.
