= Santa Maria dell'Ogninella, Catania =

Deconsecrated Roman Catholic Church

Coordinates: 37.50419°N 15.08840°E

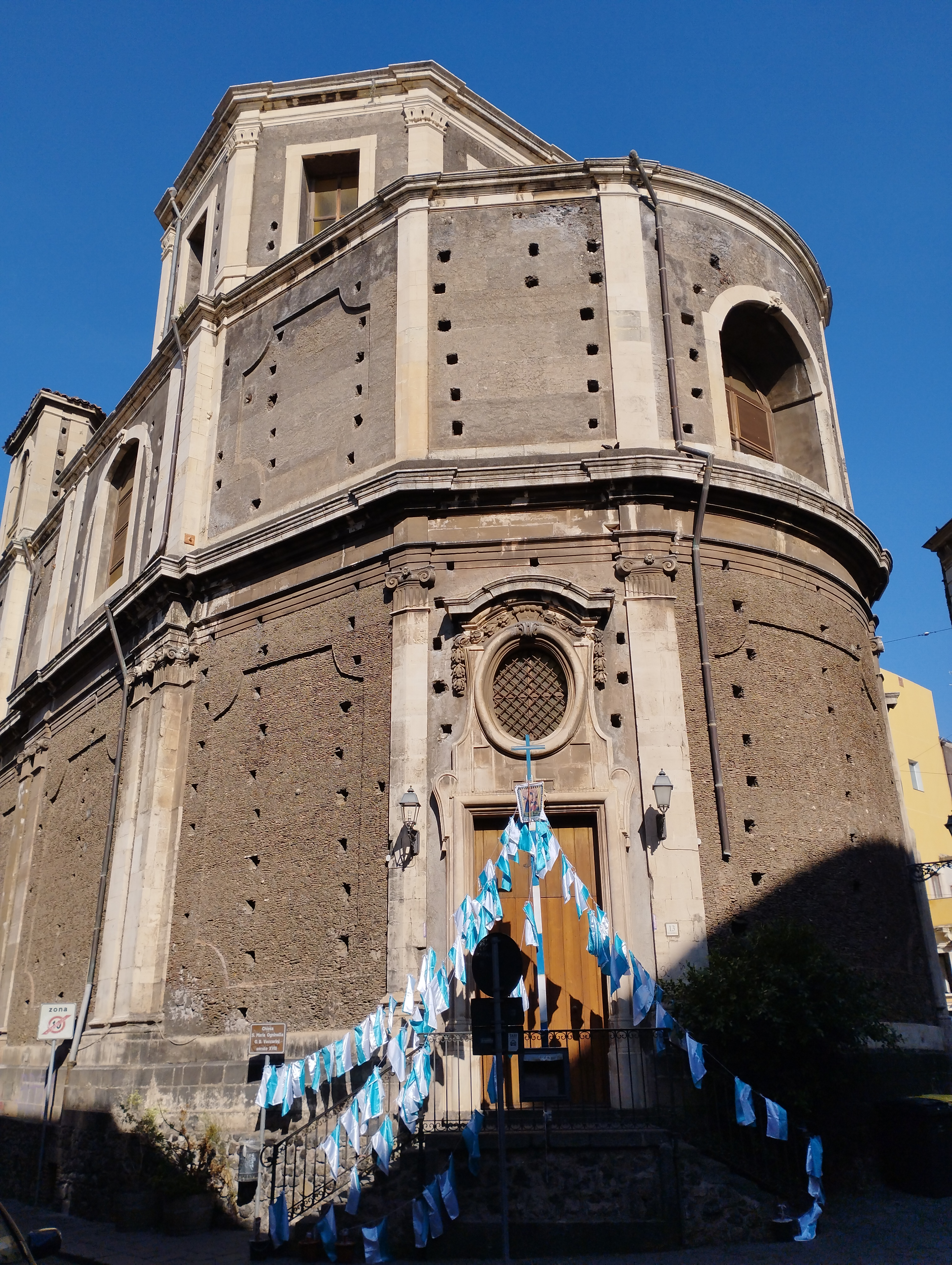

Santa Maria dell'Ogninella is a deconsecrated Roman Catholic church, located facing Piazza Ogninella, which lies two blocks east from the Piazza dell'Universita east along Via Euplio Reina, in the center of the city of Catania, Sicily, southern Italy. The church has undergone and still remains under restoration.

== History and description ==
The present church was built by 1711, commissioned by a lay congregation of individuals with doctorates in law, medicine, or theology, as well as government officials and notaries, using designs attributed to Giovanni Battista Vaccarini. The prior chapel at the site, like most of Catania, had been razed by the 1693 earthquake. The derivation of the title Ogninella is complicated. A prior church in town named Santa Maria da Ongia had been built adjacent to the town walls. The name Ongia is the site north of Catania where Ulysses had putatively disembarked in Sicily during his Odyssey. Putatively the 1693 earthquake uncovered an ancient frescoed icon of the virgin near the no longer extant Porta San Orsola in the medieval walls, that was attributed to the Ongia church. This icon was brought to be housed in this church. Somehow the name of the church was transmuted to Ogninella.

In the 20th century, the church was sold to various owners over the centuries, little of the interior decoration remains. The church has an octagonal dome and a peculiar rounded facade.

The Piazza is notable because the area was involved in the May 1860 skirmishes between rebels and the Napolitan army of the Bourbon King Francis II of the Two Sicilies. Garibaldi had landed at Marsala in Western Sicily on May 11, and was deliberately moving east with his army of volunteers. Rebellions against Bourbon rule broke out in many of the urban centers of Sicily, including Catania. Government troops aiming to disperse the rebels moved west from the Castello Ursino. In Palazzo Tornabene, across the street from the church facade, rebels had placed a cannon that had been hidden during the prior revolution (1848). Manning the cannon was Giuseppa Bolognara Calcagno, a former foundling and servant to an innkeeper. From the palace she surprised troops advancing on what is now Via Euplio Reina. Later that day she again surprised advancing troops, creating a false discharge by fulminating some gunpowder near the mouth of the cannon. When the troops advanced to capture what they considered to be a spent artillery piece, she discharged a volley at close range. She would gain the nickname Peppa a Cannunera. This allowed the rebels to capture a Bourbon artillery piece. While the rebellion in Catania was initially suppressed, the Bourbon troops would soon flee north to Messina, then to the peninsula.
