= Port of Augusta =

Coordinates: 37°10′56″N 15°11′51″E

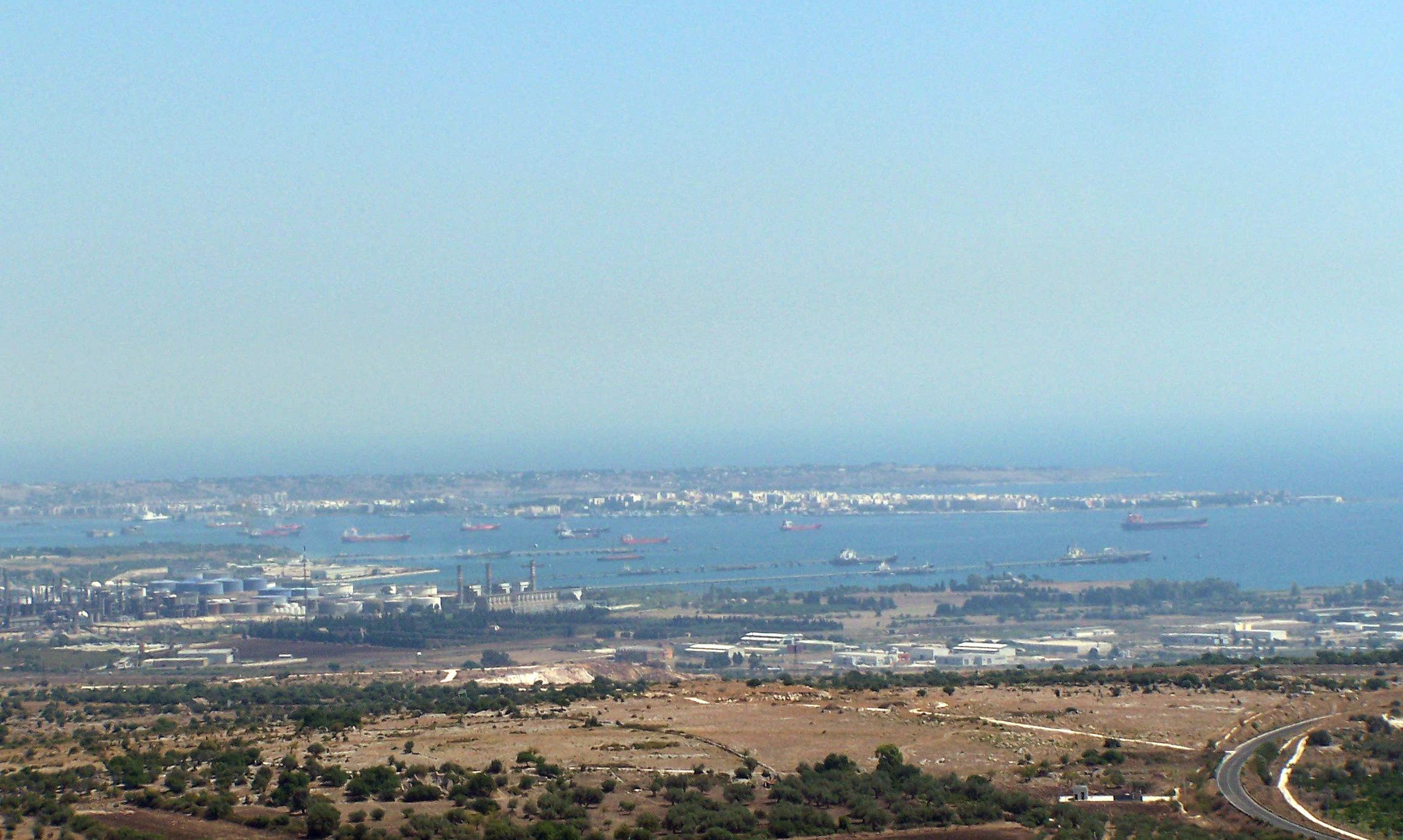
Port and bay of Augusta

Port of Augusta (Italian: Porto di Augusta) is a port serving Augusta, Sicily. In 2007, 33.041 million tonnes passed through the port.

== History ==
The natural port has been used since ancient times. In the 1910s the Royal Italian Navy developed the port and established an important military base to exercise control of the coast. The port was used by the Regia Marina during the Italo-Turkish War (1911-1912) and during the landing in Sicily by the Allies the port was subjected to repeated raids.

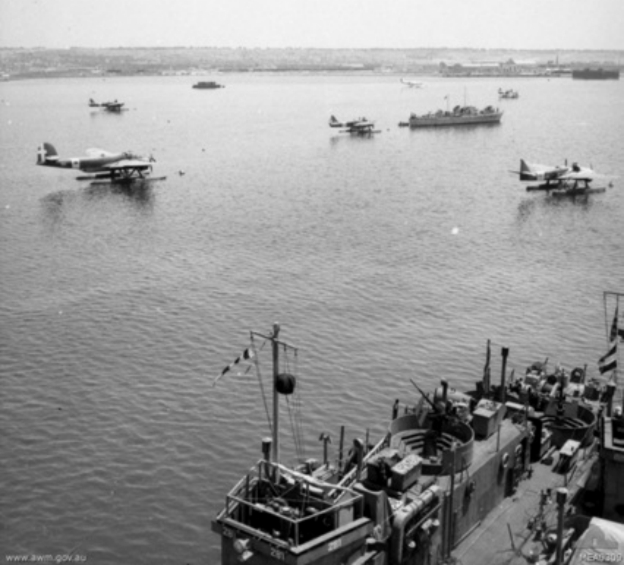
The Italian seaplane base at the port of Augusta, Sicily, Italy, circa in September 1943. Visible are six Italian CANT Z.506 Airone seaplanes

An air base was built in Augusta harbor between November 1917 and 1920 with a reinforced concrete airship hangar for use as a bombing and gunnery training school and as a reconnaissance base. Converted into a seaplane station in 1925, it became Italy’s main seaplane base on Sicily. During the war years, some 30 seaplanes were usually here at any one time including the types CANT Z.501 Gabbiano, CANT Z.506 Airone, Fiat RS.14 and the IMAM Ro.43. The base was protected by the Augusta harbor and town defenses which in late 1942 consisted of at least 8 to 13 anti-aircraft gun positions with 45-65 heavy anti-aircraft guns and 8 light anti-aircraft guns.

During the Battle of Sicily the port was subjected to repeated raids. It was occupied by the British Navy from 1943 to 1946. Oil tycoon Angelo Moratti's oil refinery Rasiom Moratti was built in 1949, marking the beginning of its history as a large-scale industrial harbor, nowadays part of the petrochemical complex Augusta-Priolo. It underwent significant development in the 1950s and early 1960s with the establishment of Sincat, belonging to the Edison Group, which operated in the sectors of inorganic chemicals and fertilizers, the power plant Tifeo, and numerous other firms including Liquigas, Ilgas, Sotis Cables and Siciltubi.

== Key features ==
The Port of Augusta entirely occupies the bay of Augusta and is composed of three major sections:

- Porto Xifonio, which is the sea area between Punta Izzo and Punta Carcarella;
- Porto Megarese: this is the inner harbor section of the northwest coast, delimited by the northern, central, and southern breakwaters;
- Seno del Priolo: this sector is located in front of the oil refining plants and is situated between the southern Megarese breakwater and the Magnisi Peninsula.

The port complex is protected by approximately 6.5 km of breakwaters, with two entrance openings. The pier system extends for 6.8 km and features 43 berths distributed along 1,160 meters of quays. The water surface area amounts to 45,000 square meters, with an average depth of 14–18 meters and some points reaching up to 22 meters. The equipped surface area exceeds 250,000 square meters, with planned expansions as part of the redevelopment of adjacent decommissioned industrial zones. The port complex includes shipyards for construction, repair, storage, and refueling. A significant portion is equipped with docks and facilities for tourism and recreational boating.
