= Santuario della Madonna del Carmine, Catania =

Catholic church in Catania, Italy

Coordinates: 37°30′25″N 15°05′03″E

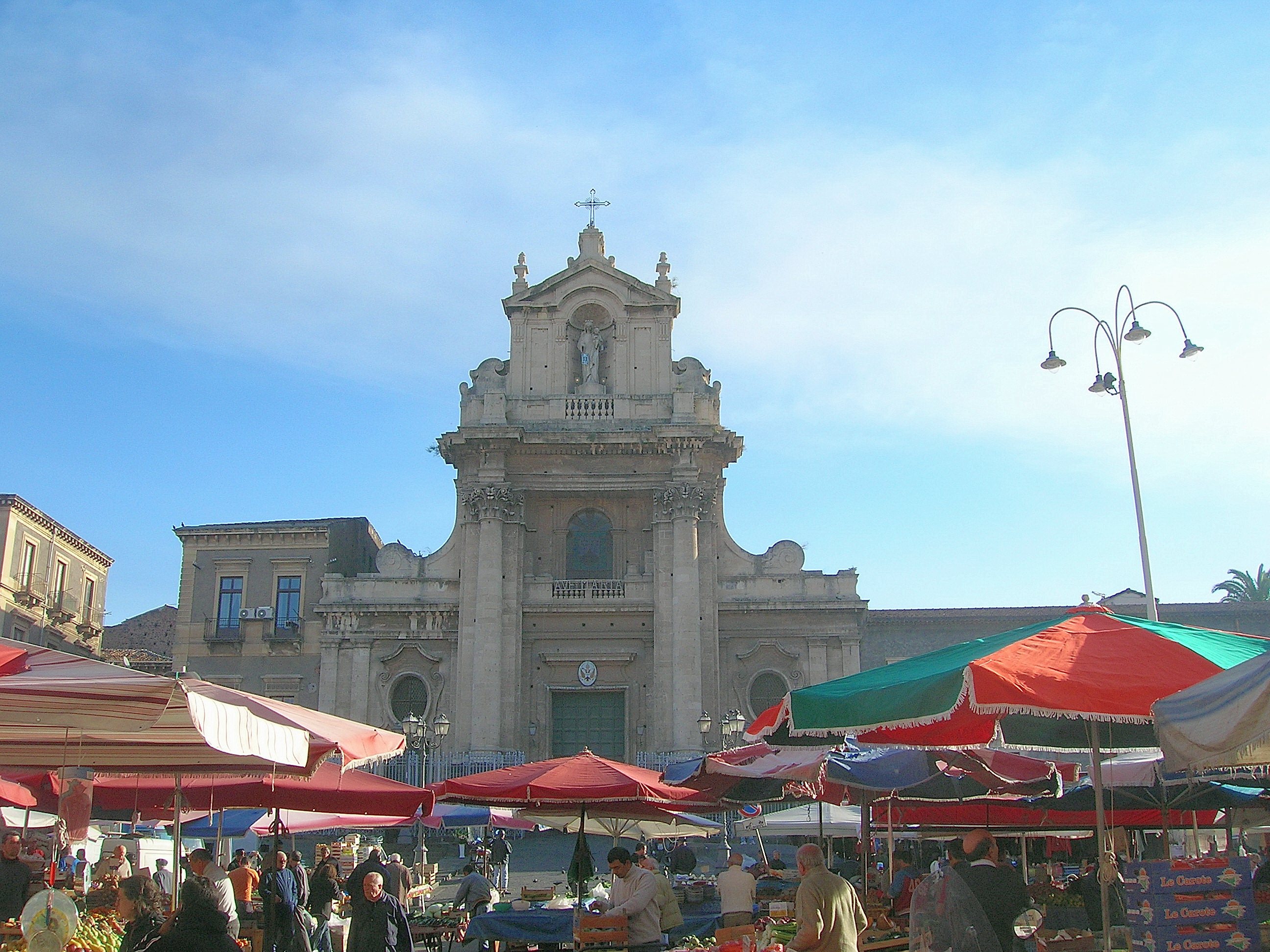
Facade in church with marketplace in front

The Santuario della Madonna del Carmine also called Basilica di Maria Santissima Annunziata al Carmine, is a Roman Catholic minor basilica church and Marian sanctuary located on Piazza Carlo Alberto, in the town of Catania, Sicily.

== History and description ==
Putatively the site has seen multiple temples. The first church built here, titled Santa Lucia fuori le mura, was founded atop or among the ruins of a pagan temple dedicated to Jove. When this church was destroyed by an earthquake in 1075, a church dedicated to the Virgin of the Annunciation was built. Sometime in the 13th century, the Carmelite Fathers took possession and added a large adjacent convent. The church was damaged severely during the 1693 Sicily earthquake and rebuilt in the present form by 1729. This church was elevated to minor basilica in 1988. The adjacent convent has been a barracks since the 19th-century.

Legend holds the church was once the first burial place for Saint Agatha, but in addition, the area during the Ancient Roman era served as a necropolis. Inside the adjacent convent are the stone remnants of an Ancient Roman tomb, which some authors had called the Tomb of Stesichorus.

The exterior facade is notable for the giant order of columns, with a design attributed to Francesco Battaglia. Behind the niche with the statue of the Virgin of the Carmine at the superior tympanum are a series of 19th-century bells. A market place is held in the piazza outside the church.

The interior has a number of large altarpieces, and funereal monuments, and a wooden icon meant to depict St Agatha but modeled after an aristocratic donor to the church, Rosalia Petruso Grimaldi, who was murdered in 1784 by her jealous husband. Among the various altarpieces are:

== Right Nave ==
- Bishop San Spiridione of Trimitonte (1946) by Sebastiano Conti Consoli, it is a copy of the prior painting destroyed during the bombings of the second world war. Il dipinto sostituisce analogo soggetto del 1860 distrutto durante i bombardamenti del secondo conflitto mondiale.
- Vision of St Joseph by Santa Teresa di Gesù (1782) by Francesco Gramignani Arezzi.
- Santa Maria Maddalena de' Pazzi (1818) by Giuseppe Zacco.
- Madonna of the Carmel by Pastura.
- Dream of St Joseph (17th-century) anonymous.

== Left Nave ==
- Sant'Angelo di Gerusalemme (1818) by Giuseppe Zacco.
- Saints Agatha and Lucy (1791) by Antonio Pennisi
- Prophet Elias (1750) by Olivio Sozzi
