= Francesco Rinaldi =

Brand of pasta sauce

Francesco Rinaldi is a brand of pasta sauce with an Italian flavor. It is manufactured as the only private-label product of the independent, privately owned LiDestri Foods (formerly Cantisano Foods), which also operates as a contract food manufacturer.

== History ==
The Cantisano Family created Ragú in 1937, sold it in 1970 (the Ragu Company would later become part of Unilever and then of Mizkan), and later founded Cantisano Foods. Ralph Cantisano purchased Francesco Rinaldi in 1981 from Francesco Rinaldi's sons (Anthony, Thomas, and Joseph). Francesco Rinaldi started the family business in 1940. Ralph Cantisano started selling Francesco Rinaldi in 1982, and marketed their new pasta sauce as tasting more Italian with his famous catchphrase "As I got older, I got better" spoken in television commercials. Later, Cantisano Foods offered a T-shirt with Ralph Cantisano's spoken line. Another line, "Ciao Francesco Rinaldi!", was popularized at the end of its commercials. Ralph Cantisano retired in 1998, and in 2002, the company was renamed LiDestri Foods. Their current slogan, "Made by Italians. Enjoyed by everyone.", was then unveiled. The CEO of LiDestri Food & Beverage is Giovanni LiDestri. Ralph Cantisano died in 2007 at age 84.
