= Augusta-Priolo =

Petrochemical complex in Sicily, Italy

Coordinates: 37.1611°N 15.2025°E

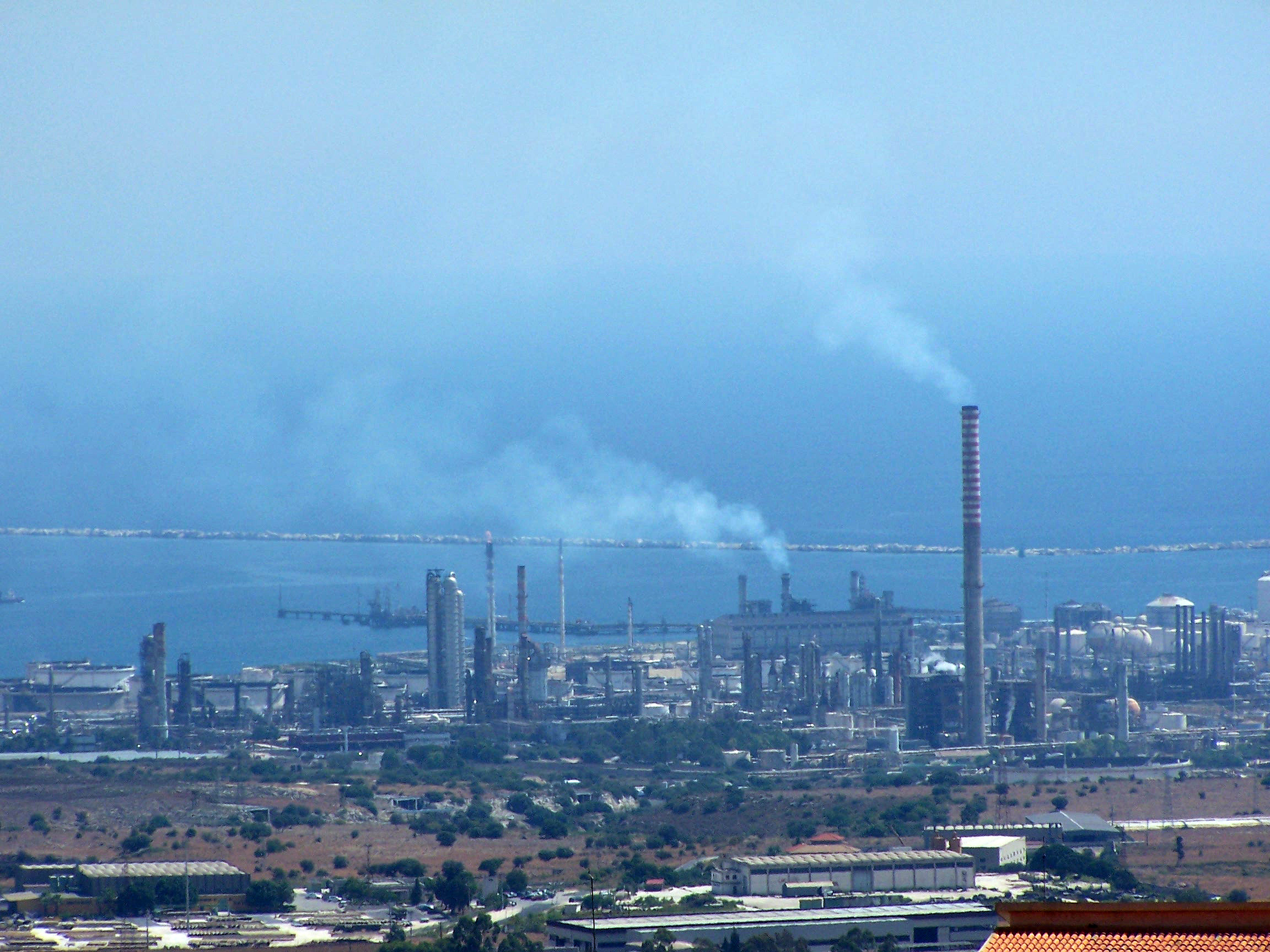
Polo petrolchimico siracusano

The petrochemical complex of Augusta-Priolo (called Polo petrolchimico siracusano in Italian) is a vast industrialized coastal area in eastern Sicily including the territory of the municipalities of Augusta, Priolo Gargallo and Melilli. Main industrial activities are oil refining, processing of oil derivatives and energy production.

The complex, whose beginnings date back to 1949, has produced significant environmental problems for the coastline and the entire area, as well as health issues and an increased death rate. The area is therefore often dubbed triangolo della morte (triangle of death).

Among the companies in the region are ExxonMobil, Sasol, Erg, Polimeri Europa and Syndial.

== See also ==
- Triangle of death (Italy)
- Angelo Moratti
- Port of Augusta
