= Monument to Luigi Capuana, Mineo =

Memorial in Piazza Buglio, Mineo, Italy

Coordinates: 37.26482°N 14.69062°E

The Monument to Luigi Capuana is a memorial erected in Piazza Buglio, in the center of the town of Mineo, province of Catania, region of Sicily, Italy. It memorializes the native novelist and dramatist Luigi Capuana (1839 – 1915), who alongside the Catanese Giovanni Verga, was one of the most prominent writers of the Verismo style in Italy.

Funds for establishing the statue were collected for almost two decades before the erection of the monument in 1939. The style of the sculptures and reliefs, created by Vincenzo Torre, resembles the heroic fascist style of the epoch. The three bas-reliefs depict scenes from four of his works: Gacinta, The Marquis of Roccaverdina, and Bona Genti. Atop a rough marble plinth is a statue of the standing author. Behind the statue are the offices of the Italian Communist party. In front, stands the city hall of the town, formerly the Jesuit college. To the right, is the former church of Sant'Antonio.
