= Viceroy (disambiguation) =

Viceroy may refer to:

== Places ==
- Viceroy, Saskatchewan, a small hamlet located in the Canadian province of Saskatchewan
- Icon Brickell, a skyscraper complex in Miami, Florida, USA has a building known as Viceroy

== Titles ==
- Viceroy, a gubernatorial title for the monarch-appointed governor of a country or province
- Viceroy of Kush, an official serving the Pharaoh of Egypt

== Arts, entertainment, and media ==
- The Viceroys (novel) (Italian: I Viceré), an 1894 novel by Federico De Roberto
  - I Viceré (film), a 2007 film based on the De Roberto novel by director Roberto Faenza
- The Viceroys (musical group), a Jamaican rocksteady/reggae vocal trio

== Brands and enterprises ==
- Viceroy (cigarette), a cigarette brand
- Vauxhall Viceroy, a large car sold in the United Kingdom

== Ships ==
- HMS Viceroy (D91), a British destroyer in commission in the Royal Navy from 1918 until the mid-1930s and from 1941 to 1945
- RMS Viceroy of India, a British ocean liner and later troop transport in service from 1929 until it sank in 1942

== Other uses ==
- Viceroy (butterfly), a North American butterfly
