= Ferdinando Petruccelli della Gattina =

Italian journalist, writer and patriot (1815-1890)

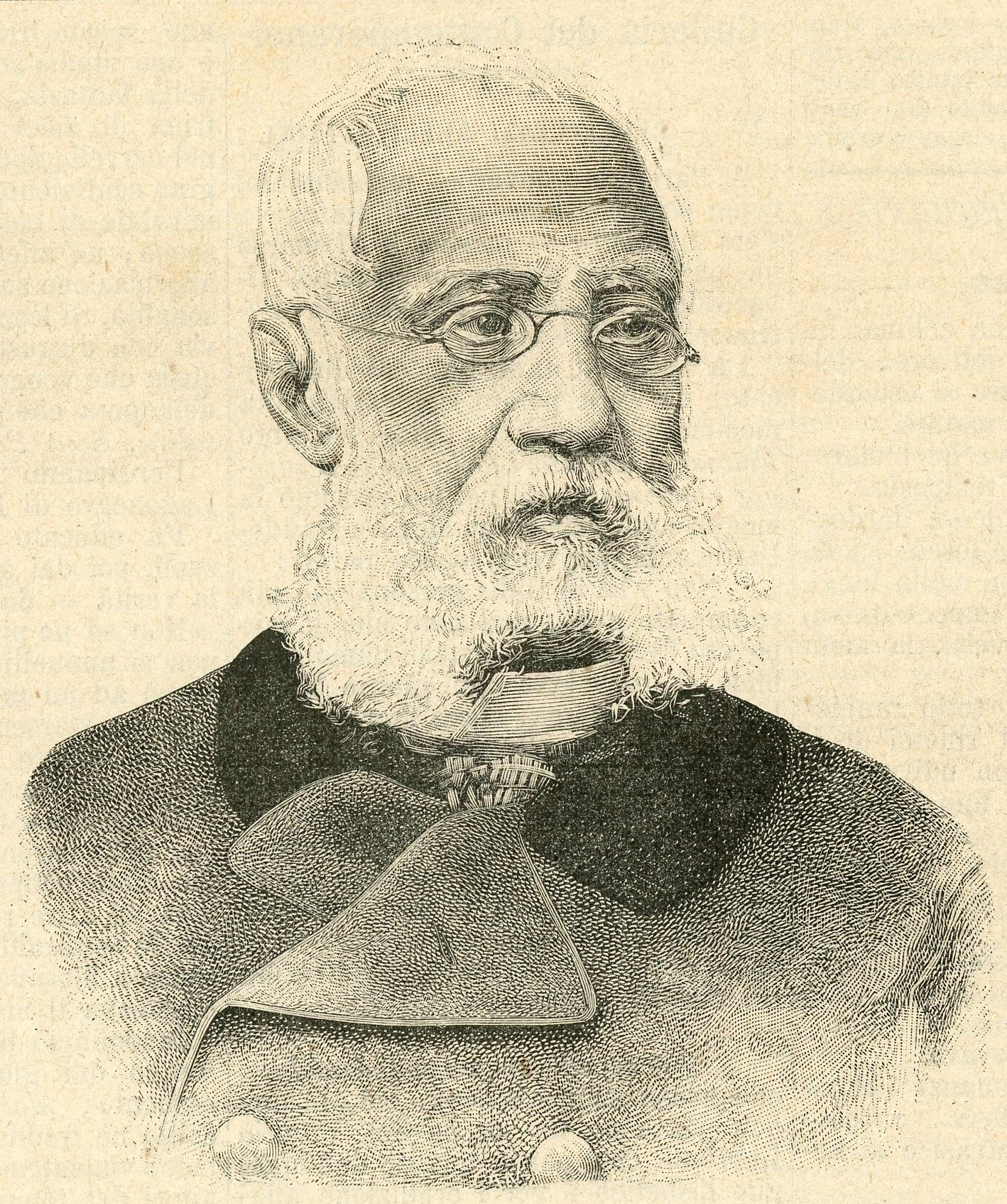
- Born: August 25, 1815; Moliterno, Kingdom of Naples
- Died: March 29, 1890 (aged 74); Paris, France
- Education: University of Naples, Sorbonne, Collège de France
- Occupations: Journalist, novelist, politician

Ferdinando Petruccelli della Gattina (August 28, 1815 - March 29, 1890) was an Italian journalist, patriot and politician.

Considered one of the greatest journalists of the 19th century and a pioneer of modern journalism, he is remembered above all for his war correspondence. He wrote for many Italian newspapers and contributed to French, British, and Belgian ones. A prolific novelist, he focused mainly on religious themes.

== Biography ==
=== Youth ===
Born in Moliterno, Basilicata, which at the time belonged to the Kingdom of Naples, his birth name was Ferdinando Petruccelli. He later added "della Gattina" (the name of a farm he owned) to throw off the Bourbon police that had been hounding him for political reasons. His father, Luigi, was a physician and a member of the Carbonari, while his mother, Maria Antonia Piccininni, was a noblewoman from Marsicovetere.

Having grown up in religious circles, and owing to the abuses he endured as a child, he developed a strong anticlericalism which would find its way into his work. In his youth, he devoted himself to the study of Latin and Greek. Later, he attended the University of Naples, graduating in medicine but choosing to embark on a journalistic career instead.

=== Early career and exile ===
In 1838, he began his career for the Neapolitan newspaper Omnibus and, in 1840, he traveled to France, Great Britain, and Germany as a correspondent for the Salvator Rosa and the Raccoglitore fiorentino. A man of liberal ideals, he was arrested for his membership in the Young Italy and was sent, under guard, back to his native town.

Returning to Naples in 1848, Petruccelli was elected deputy of the Neapolitan parliament and founded Mondo vecchio e mondo nuovo, a newspaper which he used to accuse the Bourbon dynasty of mismanagement in both internal and foreign policy, later suppressed by the magistracy for its frequent attacks on the crown. He took part in the riots of the same year when the constitution which King Ferdinand II had promulgated in late January was suspended, forcing Petruccelli to flee to France after the uprising failed. The government had him sentenced to death in absentia and confiscated his properties.

During his years in France, Petruccelli broadened his political and cultural horizons, in no small part thanks to his contact with renowned thinkers. He attended courses at the Sorbonne and the Collège de France, studied French and English literature, and pursued a brilliant career as a journalist, becoming known and appreciated across Europe. Nicknamed Pierre L'Oiseau de la Petite Chatte (a fanciful literal French translation of his surname), he entered the world of French journalism thanks to Jules Simon and Daniele Manin, the latter of whom showed his gratitude for Petruccelli's intervention through Mondo vecchio e mondo nuovo on behalf of the short-lived Republic of San Marco, which Manin had governed after the Austrians temporarily withdrew from Venetia.

=== War correspondent ===
Petruccelli became a correspondent for French and Belgian newspapers such as La Presse, Journal des débats, Revue de Paris, Le Courrier français and Indépendance Belge. In 1851, he fought alongside the French republicans against the self-coup orchestrated by Louis-Napoléon Bonaparte (later known as Napoleon III). As the rebellion failed, he was expelled from France. He settled in England, where he met Giuseppe Mazzini, Louis Blanc, Lajos Kossuth and other refugees and contributed to The Daily News, founded by Charles Dickens, and other newspapers like The Daily Telegraph and Cornhill Magazine.

In 1859, he acted as a correspondent for the Second Italian War of Independence and, in 1860, for the Expedition of the Thousand, following Giuseppe Garibaldi from Calabria as he marched into Naples. With the birth of the Kingdom of Italy, he became a member of the Italian parliament, sitting on the left benches for several years. A Freemason, he delivered speeches at the Italian Chamber of Deputies against the Roman Catholic Church, Pope Pius IX and his temporal power, also finding time to contribute to Italian newspapers and magazines such as L'Unione, L'Opinione, Fanfulla della domenica, Cronaca Bizantina and Nuova antologia.

In 1866, Petruccelli was a war correspondent for the Journal des Débats during the Third Italian War of Independence. Two years later, he married Maude Paley-Baronet, an English author whom he had met in London in 1867. He would later witness and report on the Franco-Prussian War, recounting the events from the Parisian barricades. For having defended the Communards, following the fall of the Paris Commune he was again expelled from France on Adolphe Thiers's orders (and against whom he would turn bitter words).

=== Death ===
Petruccelli lived out the remainder of his life crippled by paralysis. With his wife's assistance, however, he was able to resume writing. When he died in Paris in 1890, she refused to have his ashes carried and laid to rest in the Cemetery of Poggioreale, as proposed by the Neapolitan municipality. They were buried in London, as per his will.

== Legacy ==
During his lifetime, Petruccelli wasn't much appreciated in Italy. Save for authors like Salvatore Di Giacomo and Luigi Capuana, his staunch anti-Church views prompted widespread rejection. He was more acclaimed abroad, namely in France, where his work received positive reviews from Alphonse Peyrat, Ernest Renan and Jules Claretie, who, regarding his war correspondence of Custoza, remarked: "Nothing could be more fantastic and cruelly true than this tableau of agony. Reportage has never given a superior artwork", while Justin McCarthy regarded him as "a brilliant, audacious, eccentric Italian journalist".

In the 20th century, Petruccelli was praised by Luigi Russo and Indro Montanelli, who considered him the "most brilliant italian journalist of the 19th century" and predicted that his reports "would enchant for their freshness and modernity".

== Notable works ==
- La rivoluzione di Napoli del 1848 (1850)
- Rome and the papacy (1859)
- I moribondi del Palazzo Carignano (1862)
- Pie IX, sa vie, son règne, l'homme, le prince, le pape (1866)
- Memoirs of Judas (1867)
- Il sorbetto della regina (1875)
- I suicidi di Parigi (1878)
- Memorie del colpo di stato del 1851 a Parigi (1880)

== Bibliography ==
- Emilio Giordano, Ferdinando Petruccelli della Gattina, Edisud, 1987
