= Fanfulla della domenica =

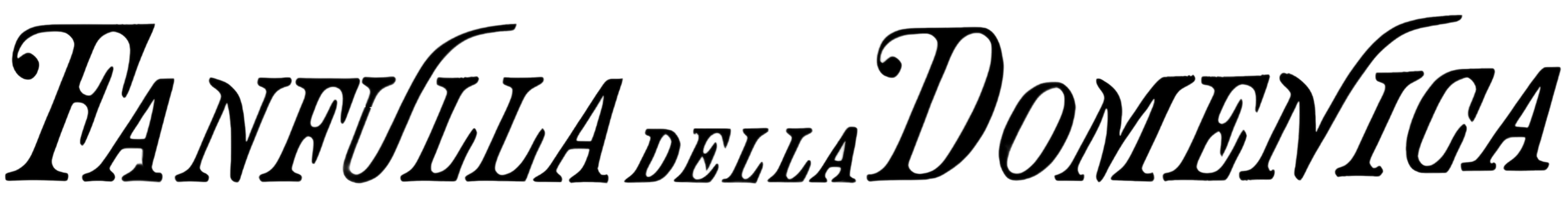

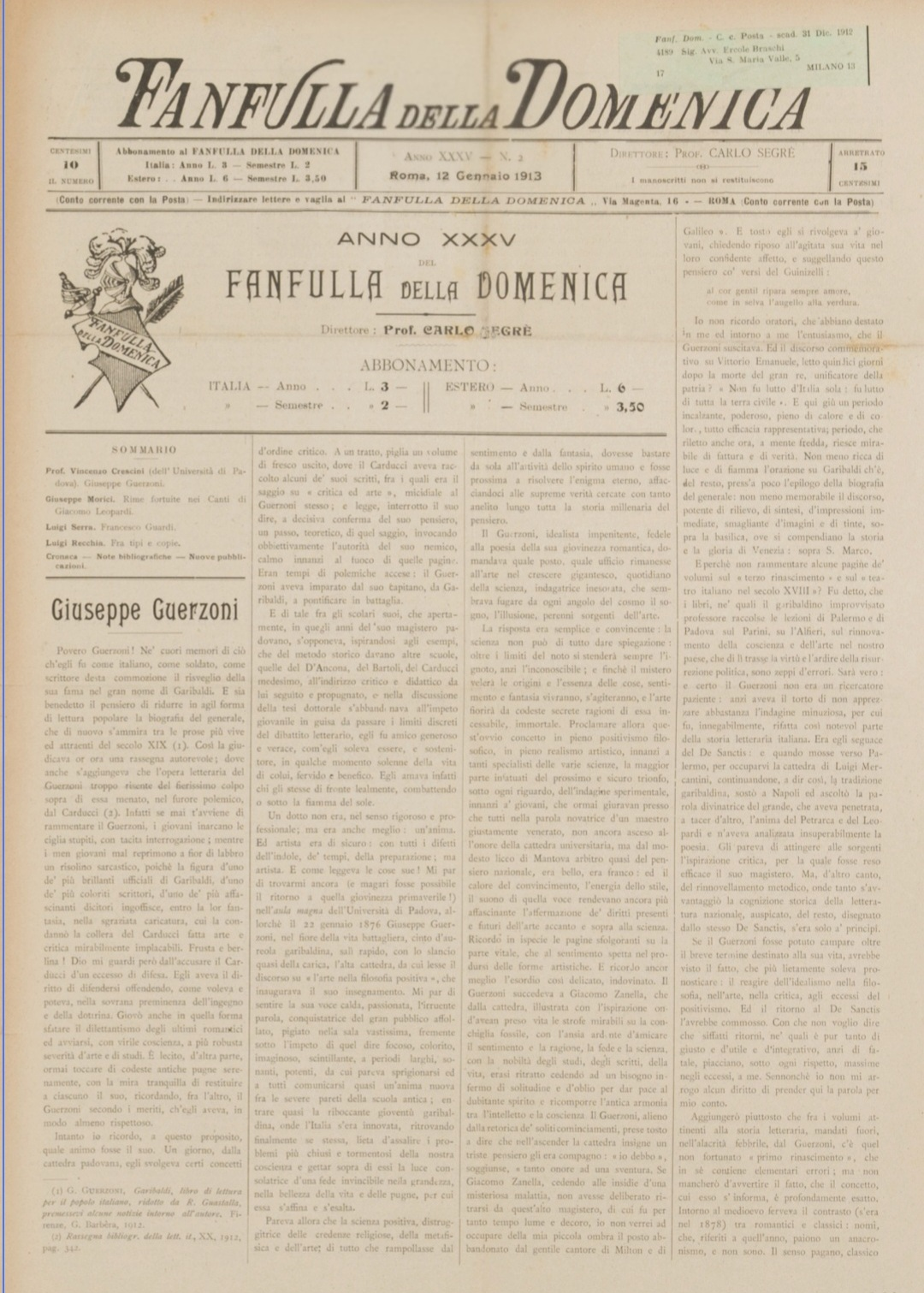
- Issue of Fanfulla della Domenica (1913)
- Publisher: Ernesto Emanuele Oblieght
- Founder: Ferdinando Martini
- Founded: 1879
- First issue: 27 July 1879
- Final issue: 31 October 1919
- Based in: Rome
- Language: Italian

Il Fanfulla della Domenica was a weekly political and literary magazine published in Rome from 1879 to 1919. It was also the leading cultural weekly in post-unification Italy.

== History ==
Conceived as a Sunday supplement to the daily newspaper Il Fanfulla, it was founded by Ferdinando Martini. The publisher was the Hungarian businessman Ernesto Emanuele Oblieght. The first issue was published on 27 July 1879. Within the first six months, circulation reached 23,000 copies.

Martini was succeeded by Luigi Capuana, Baldassarre Avanzini, Enrico Nencioni and Eugenio Checchi. Fanfulla della domenica achieved rapid success by modernising cultural reporting at the time. Its contributors included the leading figures of Verismo and Decadent literature, most notably Gabriele D'Annunzio, who published his first writings in Fanfulla in 1882, when he was nineteen.

Other contributors included Ferdinando Petruccelli della Gattina, Giosuè Carducci, Matilde Serao, Emma Perodi, Grazia Deledda, Ida Baccini, Ruggero Bonghi and Giovanni Verga, who published some of his short stories in the magazine. Federico De Roberto contributed until 1890.

During World War I, the newspaper became biweekly on 6 May 1917, and from 24 February 1918 it reduced its page count to two. Fanfulla della domenica ceased publication with the 31 October 1919 issue.

== Bibliografia ==
- Martini, Ferdinando (1931). Di palo in frasca. Dal "Fanfulla della Domenica" e da "La Domenica letteraria". Milan: Treves.
- Asor Rosa, Alberto (1987). Letteratura italiana: L'età contemporanea. Turin: Einaudi.
- Antonia Arslan; Mariagrazia Raffele, eds. (1981). Fanfulla della domenica. Treviso: Canova.
