= Jealousy (1942 film) =

1942 film

- Directed by: Ferdinando Maria Poggioli
- Written by: Sergio Amidei; Angelo Besozzi; Vitaliano Brancati; Giacomo De Benedetti; Gino Sensani; Sandro Ghenzi
- Based on: The Marquis of Roccaverdina by Luigi Capuana
- Produced by: Sandro Ghenzi
- Starring: Luisa Ferida; Roldano Lupi; Ruggero Ruggeri; Elena Zareschi
- Cinematography: Arturo Gallea
- Edited by: Mario Serandrei
- Music by: Enzo Masetti
- Production company: Società Italiana Cines
- Distributed by: ENIC
- Release date: 25 December 1942
- Running time: 86 minutes
- Country: Italy
- Language: Italian

Jealousy (Italian: Gelosia) is a 1942 Italian drama film directed by Ferdinando Maria Poggioli and starring Luisa Ferida, Roldano Lupi and Ruggero Ruggeri. The film was shot at the Cinecittà Studios in Rome with sets designed by the art director Gastone Simonetti. It belongs to the movies of the calligrafismo style. It is based on the 1901 novel The Marquis of Roccaverdina by Luigi Capuana, which was later made into a 1953 film Jealousy.

== Cast ==
- Luisa Ferida as Agrippina Solmo
- Roldano Lupi as Il marchese Antonio di Roccaverdina
- Ruggero Ruggeri as Il parocco don Silvio
- Elena Zareschi as Zosima Munoz
- Elvira Betrone as Carmelina Munoz, sua madre
- Wanda Capodaglio as La baronessa Santina di Lagomorto
- Franco Coop as L'avvocato don Aquilante Guzardi
- Bella Starace Sainati as Mamma Grazia
- Angelo Dessy as Neli Casaccio
- Anna Arena as Agata Casaccio, sua moglie
- Pio Campa as Il giudice
- Andrea D'Almaniera as Il dottore Meccio
- Renato Navarrini as L'avvocato dell' accusa
- Amalia Pellegrini as Un' amica del marchese di Roccaverdina
- Peppino Spadaro as Un amico del marchese di Roccaverdina
- Umberto Spadaro as Il testimone Sante di Mauro
- Massimo Turci as Michele, loro piccolo figlio

== Bibliography ==
- Burke, Frank . A Companion to Italian Cinema. John Wiley & Sons, 2017.
