= Fregionaia Hospital =

Former psychiatric hospital in Italy

Coordinates: 43°51′3.3″N 10°25′28.3″E

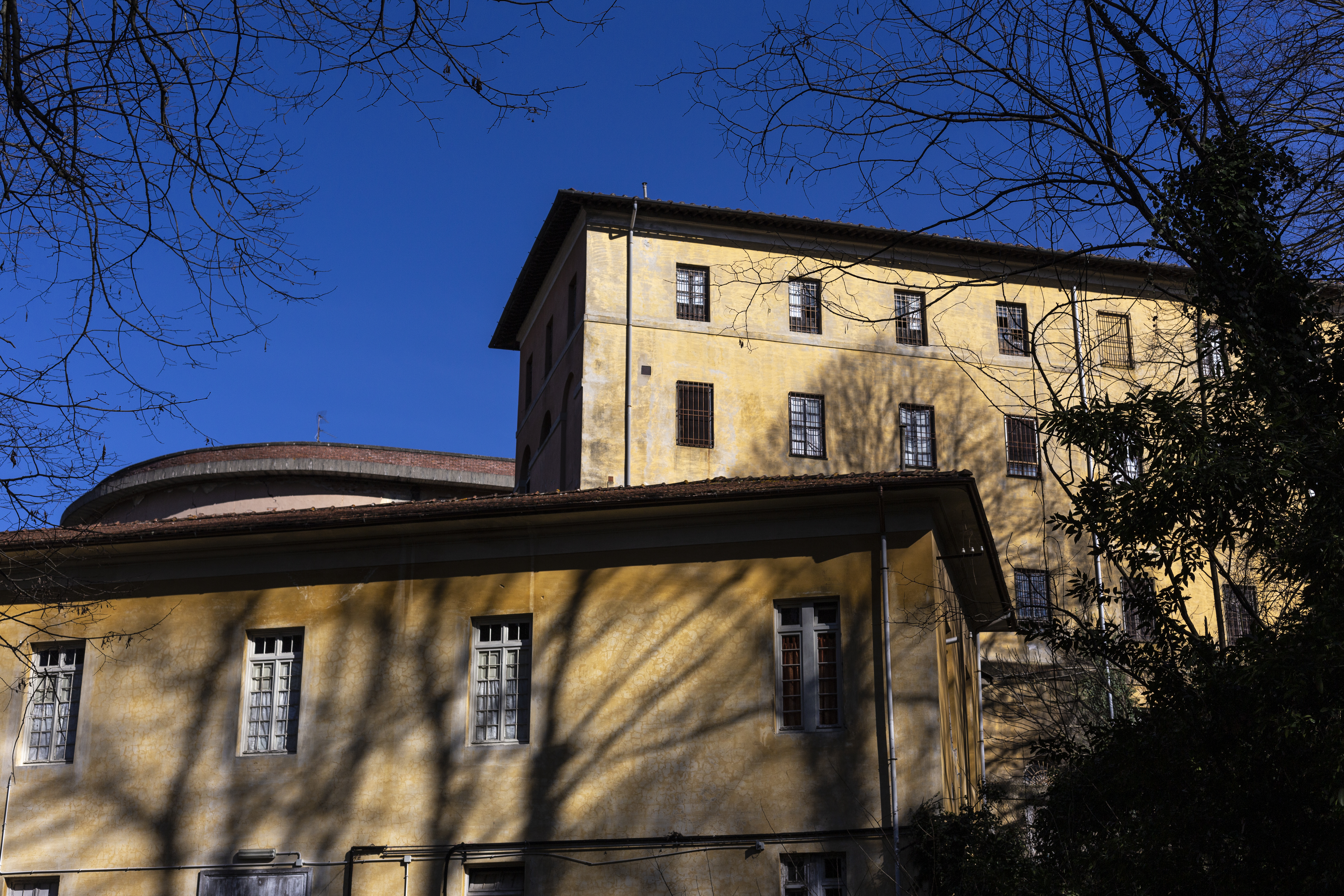

The Hospital of Fregionaia is a set of buildings in a former monastery, made into hospital for indigent, then a psychiatric hospital (ospedale psiquiatrico or manicomio), and which in 2019 lies unused and abandoned, and which is located on Via di Fregionaia in the hills outside Santa Maria a Colle - Maggiano, province of Lucca, region of Tuscany, Italy. It is representative of the large psychiatric hospitals (insane asylums) established in the post-enlightenment period of the 18th-19th century.

== History ==
Originally, these buildings were part of a monastery founded circa 1402 by the Augustinian order of Canons Regular of the Lateran, and which would become one of its main monasteries until they moved to Rome circa 1431. Circa 1770, at the request of the Republic of Lucca, the monastery of the Lateran Canons of Santa Maria di Fregionaia was suppressed, with the papal request that it become an institution affiliated with the Hospital of San Luca della Misericordia in Lucca. Some records speak of it transition into an Insane asylum or Spedale de' Pazzi opening in 1773 with 11 patients transferred here from the municipal prison of Torre. Lorenzo Bartolini, then rector of the Hospital of San Luca della Misericordia, during 1772-1775 reorganized the institution.

During the second decade of the 19th century, Giovanni Buonaccorsi, altered the institution from one merely housing the insane to one employing manual, mainly agricultural or janitorial, occupation as part of rehabilitation therapy. In 1860, a dance hall with a keyboard organ were added. In the 20th-century, the psychiatrist and author Mario Tobino, was linked to this asylum. It remained a functioning asylum till at least the 1970s.

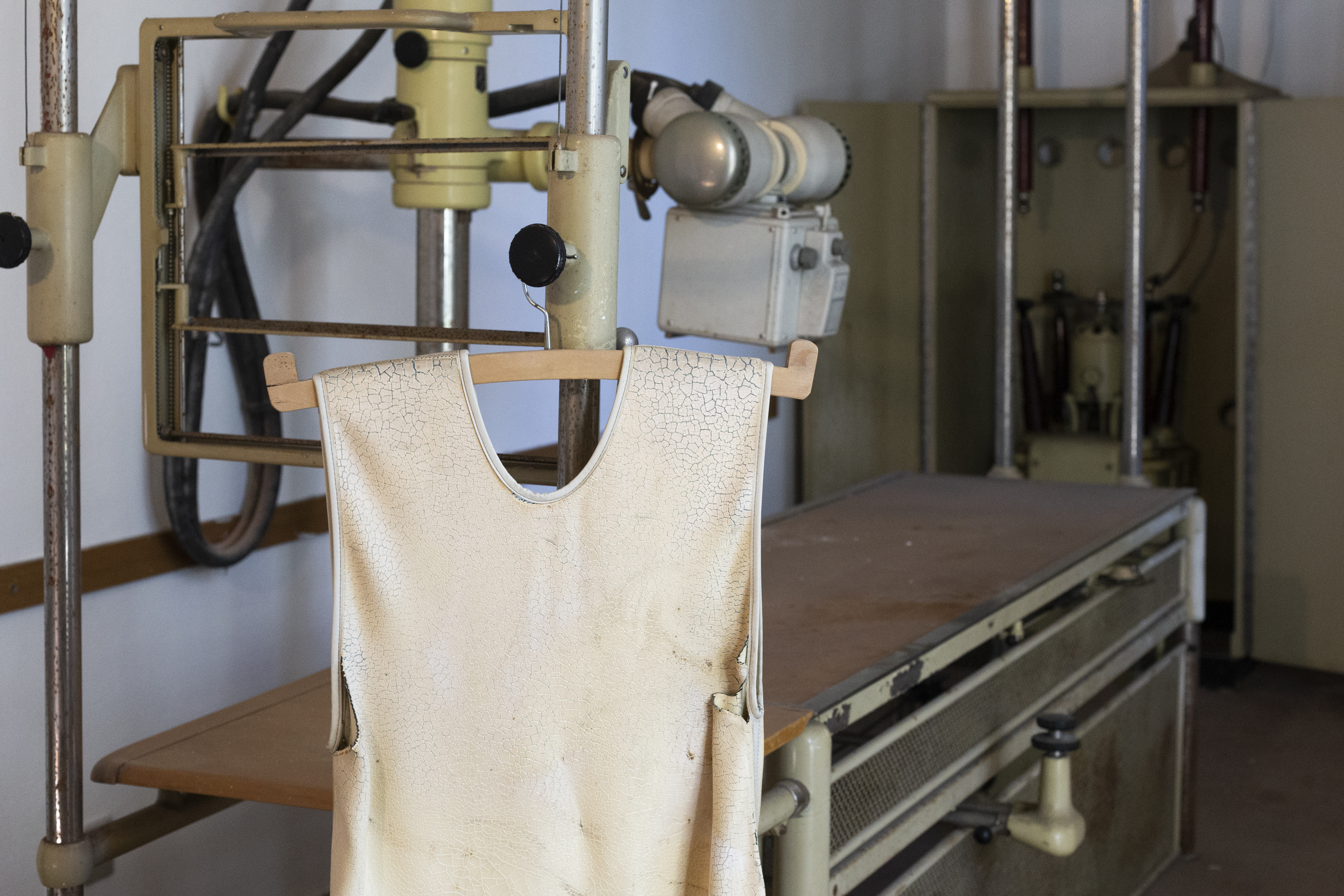

A guide to the region, describes the institution as:

a place of delight due to the amenity of the site, the healthiness of the air, and the conveniences of the building... These advantages, combined with the best curative method directed by the doctor in charge of the hospital of Lucca, ... (are) all sweet, all philosophical, without a shadow of violence, with (rarely using) the English waistcoat, and (enclosing) in a room, ensure that true healings are very frequent in this hospital. He tries to keep the (mentally ill) in action, to make them work too; they are also sent for a walk; but every chance of harming themselves is taken away from them at home and abroad, and they are always kept in sight both by day and by night, so that no sinister case (has taken) place here from 1812 onwards, since the vigilance (is) rigorous, and these sweet and philosophical methods. Everyone sleeps in separate beds: the maniacs have one cell each.
