= Jealousy (1953 Italian film) =

Film by Pietro Germi

- Directed by: Pietro Germi
- Written by: Giuseppe Mangione; Giuseppe Berto; Pietro Germi
- Based on: The Marquis of Roccaverdina by Luigi Capuana
- Produced by: Emimmo Salvi; Mario Silvestri
- Starring: Erno Crisa; Marisa Belli; Vincenzo Musolino
- Cinematography: Leonida Barboni
- Edited by: Rolando Benedetti
- Music by: Carlo Rustichelli
- Production company: Excelsa Film
- Distributed by: Minerva Film
- Release date: 29 September 1953
- Running time: 86 minutes
- Country: Italy
- Language: Italian

Jealousy (Italian: Gelosia) is a 1953 Italian drama film directed by Pietro Germi and starring Erno Crisa, Marisa Belli and Vincenzo Musolino. It is based on the 1901 novel The Marquis of Roccaverdina by Luigi Capuana. It was shot on location around Belmonte Mezzagno in Sicily. The story had previously been made into a 1942 film of the same title.

== Plot ==
At the church, Rocco, steward on the lands of a landowner, the Marquis of Roccaverdina, marries the beautiful peasant girl Agrippina. But he was shot twice. Justice arrests and condemns a certain Neli. In truth, the assassin is the marquis himself who had contracted a sham marriage with the young woman so that she would remain his mistress...

== Cast ==
- Erno Crisa as Baron Antonio
- Marisa Belli as Agrippina
- Alessandro Fersen as Don Silvio
- Liliana Gerace as Countess Zosima
- Vincenzo Musolino as Farmer Rocco
- Grazia Spadaro as Mamma Grazia
- Gustavo De Nardo as Neli Casaccio
- Maresa Gallo as Santa
- Pasquale Martino as Commissario
- Renato Pinciroli as The Lawyer
- Amedeo Trilli as Il maresciallo
- Guido Medici as The Judge
- Paola Borboni as Aunt Baroness
- Loriana Varoli as Cristina
- Giovanni Martella as Salvatore
- Assunta Radico as Madre di Agrippina
- Gustavo Serena as Doctor
