= Archibald Colquhoun (translator) =

Translator of modern Italian literature into English (1912–1964)

Archibald Colquhoun (1912–1964) was a leading translator of modern Italian literature into English. He studied at Ampleforth College, Oxford University, and the Royal College of Art. Originally a painter, he worked as director of the British Institute in Naples before the Second World War, and in Seville after the war. He worked in British intelligence during wartime. He later headed Oxford University Press' initiative to bring out Italian literary classics in translation. He scored his biggest success with Lampedusa's The Leopard, a translation that is still in print. He was also one of the first translators to introduce Italo Calvino to Anglophone readers. He was the first winner of the PEN Translation Prize, which he won for his translation of Federico de Roberto's The Viceroys. He also wrote a biography of Alessandro Manzoni.

According to Robin Healey's Twentieth-century Italian Literature in English Translation, Colquhoun was one of the top 10 translators of Italian literature of the last 70 years, alongside Patrick Creagh, Angus Davidson, Frances Frenaye, Stuart Hood, Eric Mosbacher, Isabel Quigly, Raymond Rosenthal, Bernard Wall and William Weaver.

== Selected translations ==
- Alessandro Manzoni - The Betrothed
- Donato Martucci - The Strange September of 1950
- Federico de Roberto - The Viceroys (PEN Translation Award 1963)
- Francesco Jovine - The Estate in Abruzzi
- Giuseppe Tomasi di Lampedusa - The Leopard
- Giuseppe Tomasi di Lampedusa - Places of My Infancy
- Giuseppe Tomasi di Lampedusa - The Siren and Selected Writings
- Giuseppe Tomasi di Lampedusa - Two Stories and a Memory
- Italo Calvino - The Path to the Spiders' Nests
- Italo Calvino - Adam, One Afternoon and Other Stories
- Italo Calvino - The Baron in the Trees
- Italo Calvino - The Nonexistent Knight & The Cloven Viscount
- Italo Calvino - Our Ancestors
- Italo Calvino - The Watcher and Other Stories
- Italo Svevo - A Life
- Leonardo Sciascia - The Day of the Owl (also as Mafia Vendetta)
- Mario Rigoni Stern - The Sergeant in the Snow
- Mario Pomilio - The New Line
- Mario Soldati - The Capri Letters
- Mario Tobino - The Mad Women of Magliano
- Renzo Rosso - The Bait and Other Stories
- Teodoro Giuttari - White Nights in Gaol
- Ugo Pirro - The Camp-Followers
- The Lost Legions: Three Italian War Novels
