= List of fatalities at the Monza Circuit =

Fatal accidents to competitors at the Monza Circuit, Italy during the Italian Grand Prix and other national and international motor-sport events.

== List of fatal accidents involving competitors ==
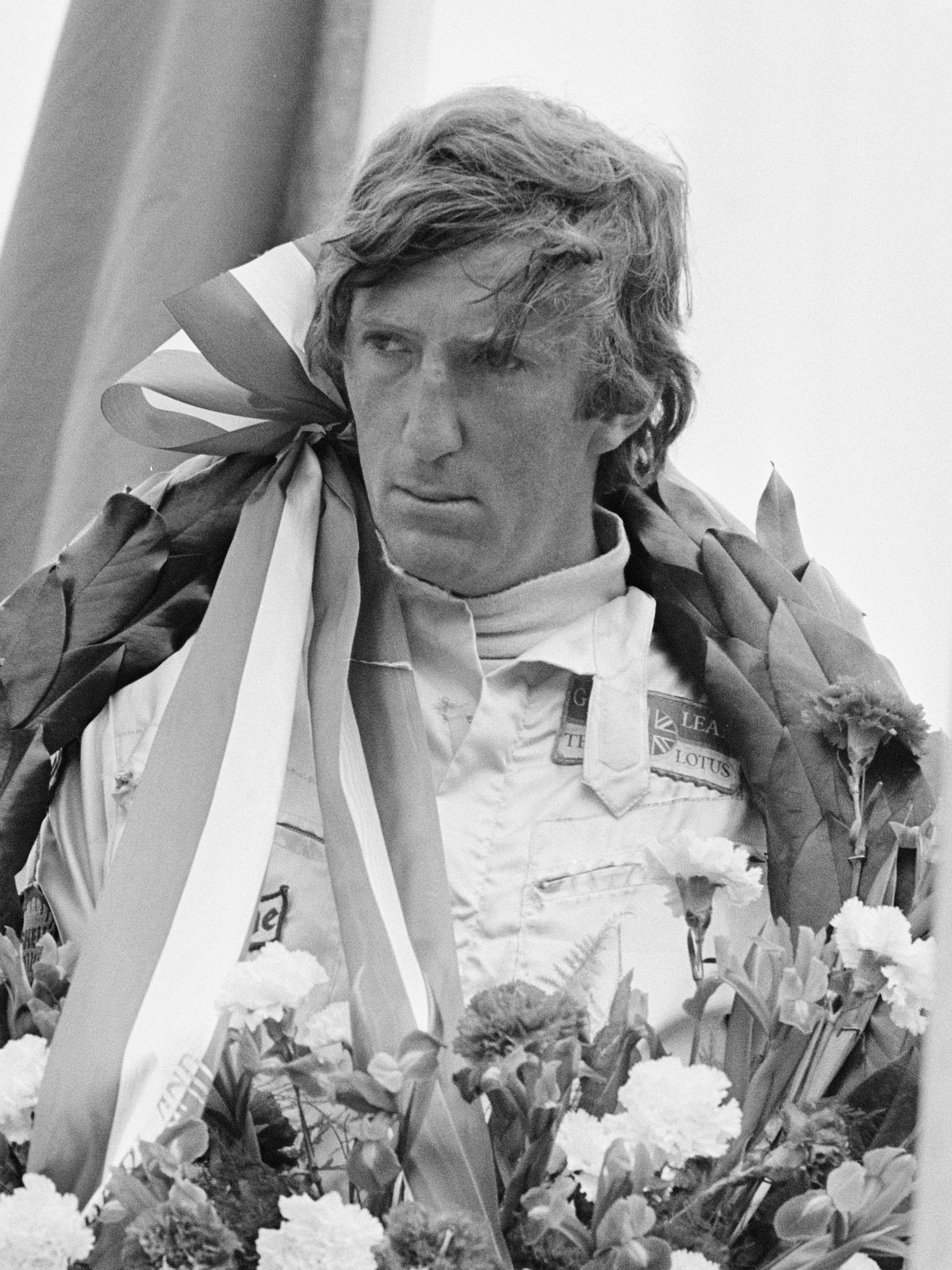
Jochen Rindt won the 1970 Formula One championship despite fatally crashing during qualifying for the 1970 Italian Grand Prix.

No	Competitor	Date	Place	Series	Race	Vehicle
1	(Germany) Gregor Kuhn	9 Sep 1922		Non-championship	1922 Italian Grand Prix	Austro-Daimler
2	(Italy) Ugo Sivocci	8 Sep 1923	Curva del Vialone	Non-championship	1923 Italian Grand Prix	Alfa Romeo P1
3	(United Kingdom) Louis Zborowski	8 Oct 1924	Curve di Lesmo	Non-championship	1924 Italian Grand Prix	Mercedes M72/94
4	(Italy) Luigi Galli	11 Sep 1926		Non-championship	1926 Grand Prix of Nations	250cc Garelli
5	(Italy) Potito Franciosa	26 June 1927	Curve di Lesmo	Non-championship	1927 Coppa Primi Passi	Lancia Lambda
6	(Italy) Emilio Materassi	9 Sep 1928	Rettifilo Tribune	Non-championship	1928 Italian Grand Prix	Lancia Lambda
7	(Italy) Luigi Arcangeli	23 May 1931	Curva del Vialone	1931 AIACR European Championship	1931 Italian Grand Prix	Alfa Romeo 12C
8	(Italy) Baconin Borzacchini	10 Sep 1933	South Curve	Non-championship	1933 Monza Grand Prix	Maserati 8C
9	(Italy) Giuseppe Campari	10 Sep 1933	South Curve	Non-championship	1933 Monza Grand Prix	Alfa Romeo P3
10	(Poland) Stanisław Czaykowski	10 Sep 1933	South Curve	Non-championship	1933 Monza Grand Prix	Bugatti T54
11	(Italy) Aldo Marazza	11 Sep 1938	Curve di Lesmo	Non-championship	Gran Premio di Milano	Maserati 6CM
12	(Italy) Ignazio Radice Fossati	4 Oct 1936			Record Attempt	Maserati Tipo 4 CS
13	(Italy) Giovanni Moretti	24 Oct 1948	Curve di Lesmo	Italian 1st Class Motorcycle Championship	1948 Gran Premio d'Autunno	Moto Guzzi 500cc
14	(Austria) Rupert Hollaus	11 Sep 1954	Curve di Lesmo	1954 FIM World Motor-Cycle Championship	1954 Grand Prix of Nations	125cc NSU
15	(United Kingdom) Ron Searles	14 Oct 1957	Circuito Sopraelevato		Record Attempt	Cooper Bobtail Mk II
16	(Italy) Nino Crivellari	28 June 1959	Curva del Vialone	1959 Campionato Italiano Allievi	1959 Coppa Junior	Stanguellini - Fiat
17	(Italy) Alfredo Tinazzo	28 June 1959	Curva del Vialone	1959 Campionato Italiano Allievi	1959 Coppa Junior	De Sanctis–Fiat
18	(Italy) Adolfo Covi	6 Sep 1959	Curva del Vialone	1959 FIM World Motor-Cycle Championship	1959 Grand Prix of Nations	500cc Norton
19	(Italy) Glicerio Barbolini	7 May 1961	Rettifilo Tribune	Non-championship	1961 Coppa Ascari	Lancia Appia Zagato
20	(Italy) Franco Tirri	3 Sep 1961	Curve di Lesmo	1961 FIM World Motor-Cycle Championship	1961 Grand Prix of Nations	125cc Ducati
21	(Germany) Wolfgang von Trips	10 Sep 1961	Curva Parabolica	1961 FIA Formula 1 World Championship	1961 Italian Grand Prix	Ferrari Dino 156
22	(Italy) Marcello De Luca	16 Sep 1962	Curva Parabolica	1962 Campionato Italiano Formula Junior	1962 Coppa Junior Monza	Dagrada - Lancia
23	(Italy) Norberto Bagnalasta	28 June 1964	Rettifilo Tribune	1964 Italian F3 Championship	1964 Gran Premio della Lotteria	Lotus 20
24	(Switzerland) Tommy Spychiger	25 April 1965	Curva Parabolica	1965 World Championship of Makes	1965 1000 km di Monza	Ferrari 365 P2
25	(Italy) Roberto Parodi	3 Oct 1965	Curva Parabolica	Non-championship	1965 Coppa Leopoldo Carri	FIAT Abarth 695
26	(Italy) Attilio Zuppini	13 March 1965	Curve di Lesmo	Non-championship	1966 Coppa Fisa	FIAT Abarth 850 TC
27	(United Kingdom) Boley Pittard	10 June 1967	Rettifilo Tribune	1967 FIA Italian F3 Championship	1967 Coppa Autodromo di Monza	Lola T60 - Ford
28	(Austria) Jochen Rindt	5 Sep 1970	Curva Parabolica	1970 FIA Formula 1 World Championship	1970 Italian Grand Prix	Lotus-Ford 72
29	(Italy) Achille Rossi	12 June 1971	Curva Parabolica	Non-championship	1971 Trofeo Bepi Koelliker	500cc Kawasaki
30	(United Kingdom) David Bartropp	16 Feb 1973	Curva Parabolica	1973 The 240 Hours of Monza	Record Attempt	Ford Escort 1100
31	(Italy) Renzo Pasolini	20 May 1973	Curve Grande	1973 FIM World Motor-Cycle Championship	1973 Grand Prix of Nations	250cc Harley Davidson
32	(Finland) Jarno Saarinen	20 May 1973	Curve Grande	1973 FIM World Motor-Cycle Championship	1973 Grand Prix of Nations	250cc Yamaha
33	(Italy) Renzo Colombini	8 July 1973	Curva Grande	1973 Campionato Italiano Juniores	1973 500 km di Monza	500cc Suzuki
34	(Italy) Renato Galtrucco	8 July 1973	Curva Grande	1973 Campionato Italiano Juniores	1973 500 km di Monza	500cc Suzuki SAIAD
35	(Italy) Carlo Chionio	8 July 1973	Curva Grande	1973 Campionato Italiano Juniores	1973 500 km di Monza	500cc Honda
36	(Switzerland) Silvio Moser	25 April 1974	Curva Ascari	1974 World Championship of Makes	1974 1000 km di Monza	Lola T294
37	(Sweden) Ronnie Peterson	10 Sep 1978	Rettifilo Tribune	1978 FIA Formula 1 World Championship	1978 Italian Grand Prix	Lotus 78 - Cosworth
38	(Italy) Mauro Ceccoli	24 May 1987	Curve di Lesmo	1987 Gran Premio delle Nazioni	1987 Yamaha Super Trophy	400cc Yamaha FZ
39	(Italy) Wilmer Marsigli	2 Aug 1991	Rettifilo	1991 Italian Motor-Cycle Championship	Trofeo Italiano 250	250cc Aprilia
40	(Italy) Domenico Cirrito	15 June 1992		1992 Trofeo Series	Practice	750cc Suzuki
41	(Italy) Marco Burnelli	8 April 1996	Curva Grande	1996 Italian Supersport Championship	Supersport Race	600cc Ducati
42	(Belgium) Michael Paquay	7 May 1998	Rettifilo	1998 Monza Superbike World Championship round	1998 World Supersport Championship	600cc Honda CBR

== List of fatal accidents during unofficial testing ==
No	Competitor	Date	Place	Entrant	Event	Type
1	Enrico Giaccone	26 Aug 1923		FIAT S.A.	Private Test	Fiat 805
2	(Nazi Germany) Rudolf Heydel	4 Feb 1936		Auto Union AG	Private Test	Auto Union Type C
3	Emilio Villoresi	20 June 1939		Scuderia Ferrari	Private Test	Alfa Romeo 158 Alfetta
4	Renzo Cantoni	5 March 1939			Private Test	Maserati 1100
5	(Italy) Luigi Alberti	28 June 1959	Curva Grande	Moto Guzzi SpA	Private Test	500cc Moto Guzzi Dondolino
6	(Italy) Alberto Ascari	26 May 1955	Curva del Vialone	Scuderia Ferrari	Private Test	Ferrari 750S Monza
7	(Italy) Gianni Degli Antoni	7 Aug 1956	Curve di Lesmo		Private Test	125cc Ducati Desmo
8	(United Kingdom) Phil Green	5 May 1959	Curve di Lesmo		Private Test	MG Spider
9	(Italy) Bruno Deserti	25 May 1965	Curva Grande	Scuderia Ferrari	Private Test	Ferrari 330 P3
10	(Italy) Davide Gallieri	12 May 1998	Rettifilo		Private Test	600cc Bimota YB9 SR

== List of fatal accidents involving race officials ==
No	Official	Date	Place	Series	Race	Role
1	(Italy) Paolo Gislimberti (Note: Gislimberti died on September 11, 2000, the day after his accident.)	10 Sep 2000	Variante della Roggia	2000 FIA Formula 1 World Championship	2000 Italian Grand Prix	Fire Marshal

== List of fatal accidents involving spectators ==
Fatalities	Driver	Date	Place	Series	Race
20	Emilio Materassi	9 Sep 1928	Rettifilo Tribune		1928 Italian Grand Prix
15	(Germany) Wolfgang von Trips	10 Sep 1961	Curva Parabolica	1961 FIA Formula 1 World Championship	1961 Italian Grand Prix

== See also ==
- Driver deaths in motorsport
