= Roberto Faenza =

Italian film director

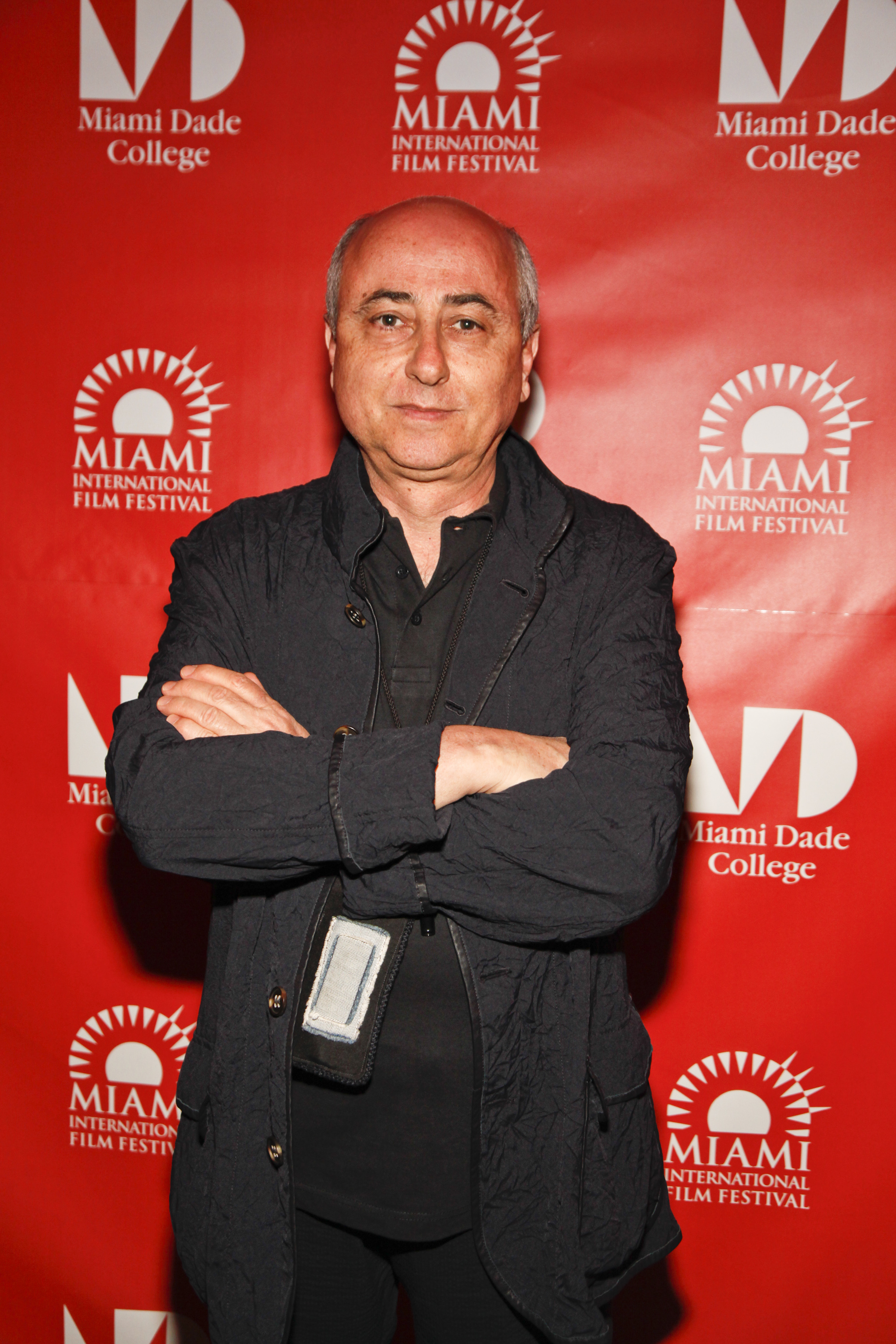
- Faenza at the 2012 Miami International Film Festival presentation of Someday This Pain Will Be Useful to You
- Born: 21 February 1943 (age 83); Turin, Italy
- Occupation: Film director
- Years active: 1968–present

Roberto Faenza (born 21 February 1943 in Turin) is an Italian film director. He received a degree in Political Science and a diploma at the Centro Sperimentale di Cinematografia.

== Career ==
Faenza made his directing debut in 1968 with the international success, Escalation, a film that describes the different sides of power through the relationship between a middle-class father and his hippie son. Immediately after that he directed H2S, an angry apology of the 1968 movement, seized two days after its release and not distributed since. Upon this sequestration he travelled to the United States to teach at the Federal City College of Washington DC.

In 1978 he directed Forza Italia!, a ferocious satire on the power of the Italian Christian Democrat party covering thirty years of Italian political history. The film was withdrawn from the theatres on the day Aldo Moro, president of the Christian Democrats, was kidnapped, and remains banned for over 15 years. Aldo Moro being the one who will end his life recommending (in his handwritten memoirs found in the den of the Red Brigades in via Monte Nevoso in Milan) to see the film "if one wants to realize the recklessness of his fellow party members".

In 1980 Faenza chose the Italian Communist Party as subject matter with Si salvi chi vuole. Considered as a politically incorrect director, he was forced to work outside of Italy to be able to find financing: in 1983 he filmed Copkiller in New York City with Harvey Keitel, Nicole Garcia and the leader of the Sex Pistols, Johnny Rotten.

His activities are not limited to cinema: author of essays and books (best known among them: Senza chiedere permesso, Il malaffare, Gli americani in Italia), upon his return in Italy he starts teaching Mass Communication at Pisa University. After Copkiller he became inspired by literature as a source of stories.

In 1990 he directed The Bachelor, based on a short story by Arthur Schnitzler with a wide cast of profiled actors: Keith Carradine, Miranda Richardson, Kristin Scott Thomas and Max von Sydow. In 1993 he directed Jonah Who Lived in the Whale starring actress Juliet Aubrey for which he was awarded the David di Donatello for Best Director. The film was entered into the 18th Moscow International Film Festival where it won the Prix of Ecumenical Jury.

Two years later another novel (this time by Antonio Tabucchi) was the source: Sostiene Pereira, Marcello Mastroianni's last Italian film, the latter awarded with a David di Donatello as Best Leading Actor. In 1997 he directed Marianna Ucrìa based on the novel La lunga vita di Marianna Ucria by Dacia Maraini. It was entered into the 20th Moscow International Film Festival.

In 1999 he directed The Lost Lover, inspired by the bestseller by Abraham B. Yehoshua about the ongoing clash between Jews and Palestinians. In 2003 he received international success with The Soul Keeper, based on the burning passion between Carl Gustav Jung and his young Russian patient Sabina Spielrein.

His most recent films are: Come into the Light, about the life of Pino Puglisi, the parish priest killed in Palermo by the Mafia in 1993, played by Luca Zingaretti (Nomination European Academy Award (EFA) as Best Director 2005; David Giovani Best Film Award; Flaiano Best Leading Actor Award and Audience Award for the Best Film; Best Leading Actor Award at the Karlovy Vary International Film Festival 2005; San Fedele Best Film Award); The Days of Abandonment, inspired on the novel by Elena Ferrante, with Margherita Buy, Luca Zingaretti and the musician Goran Bregović. I Vicerè, based on the 1894 novel by Federico De Roberto, was released in 2007.

In 2012 he directed Someday This Pain Will Be Useful to You, shot in New York and based on the novel by Peter Cameron, starred Ellen Burstyn and Marcia Gay Harden. Also starring in the film was Toby Regbo, Peter Gallagher, Deborah Ann Woll, Lucy Liu and Stephen Lang.
