= Léon Faucher =

French politician and economist (1803–1854)

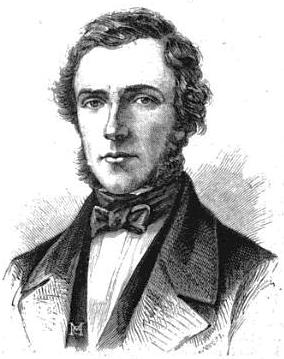

Prime Minister of France
- In office 10 April 1851 – 26 October 1851
- Preceded by: Alphonse Henri, comte d'Hautpoul
- Succeeded by: Personal rule of Napoleon III; No Prime Minister until 1869, with Émile Ollivier

Personal details
- Born: 8 September 1803 Limoges
- Died: 14 December 1854 (aged 51) Marseille
- Party: Independent

Léonard Joseph Léon Faucher (French: [leɔ̃ foʃe]; 8 September 1803 – 14 December 1854) was a French politician and economist.

== Biography ==
Faucher was born at Limoges, Haute-Vienne. When he was nine years old the family moved to Toulouse, where the boy was sent to school. His parents were separated in 1816, and Léon Faucher, who resisted his father's attempts to put him to a trade, helped to support himself and his mother during the rest of his school career by designing embroidery and needlework. As a private tutor in Paris he continued his studies in the direction of archaeology and history, but with the revolution of 1830 he was drawn into active political journalism on the Liberal side. He was on the staff of the Temps from 1830 to 1833, when he became editor of the Constitutionnel for a short time. A Sunday journal of his own, Le Bien public, proved a disastrous financial failure; and his political independence having caused his retirement from the Constitutionnel, he joined in 1834 Le Courrier français, of which he was editor from 1839 until 1842, when the paper changed hands.

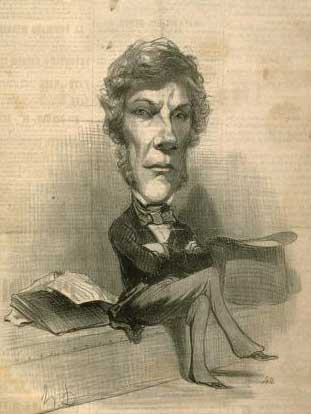
Caricature of Faucher

Faucher was an early member of the Société d'économie politique organized in 1842 by Pellegrino Rossi. He belonged in policy to the dynastic Left, and consistently preached moderation to the more ardent Liberals. On resigning his connection with the Courrier français he gave his attention chiefly to many economic questions. He advocated a customs union between the Latin countries to counterbalance the German Zollverein, and in view of the impracticability of such a measure narrowed his proposal in 1842 to a customs union between France and Belgium.He helped to organize the Bordeaux association for free-trade propaganda, and it was as an advocate of free trade that he was elected in 1847 to the chamber of deputies for Reims.

After the revolution of 1848 he entered the Constituent Assembly for the department of Marne, where he opposed many Republican measures – the limitation of the hours of labour, the creation of the national relief works in Paris, the abolition of the death penalty and others. Under the presidency of Louis Napoleon he became minister of public works, and then minister of the interior, but his action in seeking to influence the coming elections by a circular letter addressed to the prefects was censured by the Constituent Assembly, and he was compelled to resign office on 14 May 1849. In 1851 he was again minister of the interior until Napoleon declared his intention of resorting to universal suffrage. After the coup d'état of December he refused a seat in the consultative commission instituted by Napoleon. He had been elected a member of the Academy of Moral and Political Science in 1849, and his retirement from politics permitted a return to his writings on economics. He had been to Italy in search of health in 1854, and was returning to Paris on business when he was seized by typhoid at Marseille, where he died.

== Works ==
In 1843 Faucher visited England to study the English social system, publishing the results of his investigations in a noted series of Etudes sur l'Angleterre (2 vols., 1845), published originally in the Revue des deux mondes.

His miscellaneous writings were collected (2 vols., 1856) as Mélanges d'economie politique et de finance, and his speeches in the legislature are printed in vol. ii. of Léon Faucher, biographie et correspondance (2 vols., 2nd ed., Paris, 1875).

== Sources ==
- Rines, George Edwin, ed. (1920). "Faucher, Léonard Joseph" . Encyclopedia Americana.

Preceded by Alphonse Henri, comte d'Hautpoul	Prime Minister of France; 1849–1851	Succeeded by Émile Ollivier (1870*)
