= This Kind of Love (film) =

- Directed by: Alberto Bevilacqua
- Produced by: Mario Cecchi Gori
- Starring: Ugo Tognazzi
- Cinematography: Roberto Gerardi
- Edited by: Alberto Gallitti
- Music by: Ennio Morricone
- Release date: 1972
- Country: Italy
- Language: Italian

Questa specie d'amore (aka, This Kind of Love) is a 1972 Italian drama film directed by Alberto Bevilacqua. It is based on the novel with the same name written by Bevilacqua himself. The film was awarded with the David di Donatello for best film and two Nastro d'Argento awards for best screenplay and for best story.

== Cast ==
- Jean Seberg: Giovanna
- Ugo Tognazzi: Federico/ Father of Federico
- Ewa Aulin: Isina
- Angelo Infanti: Bernardo
- Evi Maltagliati: Mother of Federico
- Fernando Rey: Father of Giovanna
- Marisa Belli
