= The Marquis of Roccaverdina =

1901 novel by Luigi Capuana

- Author: Luigi Capuana
- Original title: Il marchese di Roccaverdina
- Language: Italian
- Publisher: Fratelli Treves
- Publication date: 1901
- Publication place: Italy
- Pages: 386

The Marquis of Roccaverdina (Italian: Il marchese di Roccaverdina) is a 1901 novel by the Italian writer Luigi Capuana. It follows a Sicilian nobleman's mental descent as he arranges a sham marriage between his peasant-girl mistress and his steward, but ends up killing the latter out of jealousy and frames another man for the murder.

The novel was Capuana's return to verismo, an Italian movement of literary naturalism, of which it became one of the most famous examples. Critics and scholars have discussed to what extent it is loyal to a naturalist programme or contains elements of idealism.

The novel was the basis for the 1942 film Jealousy, the 1953 film Jealousy and the 1972 television serial Il marchese di Roccaverdina.
