= The Viceroys (novel) =

1894 novel by Federico De Roberto

- Cover of the fourth Italian edition
- Author: Federico De Roberto
- Original title: I Viceré
- Translator: Archibald Colquhoun
- Language: Italian
- Publisher: Galli
- Publication date: 1894
- Publication place: Italy
- English publication date: 1962

The Viceroys (Italian: I Viceré) is an 1894 novel by the Italian writer Federico De Roberto. It is set in Sicily and follows three generations of the Uzedas, a noble family of Catania of Spanish origins, from 1855 to 1882, as society is reshaped by the unification of Italy and family members try various schemes to remain prominent. The novel is regarded as a major work of Italian realism.

An English translation by Archibald Colquhoun was published in 1962. The novel influenced Pirandello's I vecchi e i giovani and Giuseppe Tomasi di Lampedusa's The Leopard. The film adaptation I Viceré was directed by Roberto Faenza and premiered in 2007.

== Contents and style ==
The novel, consisting of three parts, is based upon the story of the fictional Uzeda princes of Francalanza. This family served as viceroys during the previous Spanish rule of the Kingdom of Sicily. The plot, focusing on the social and political background of the time, follows the private history of the Uzedas during the last year of Bourbon domination in the Kingdom of the Two Sicilies and the first decades of the Kingdom of Italy, portraying the transition from feudalism to a parliamentary system.

The Uzedas are depicted, in their will to power, desperation, and cruelty, as representatives of a race that has degenerated into madness. Yet, however delirious and blind to social and political realities, they are capable of adapting to the new order, accommodating their economic interests with those of the bourgeoisie to retain their privileges and capacity to rule. De Roberto's wholly negative message is that history is monotonous repetition; what looks like change is only an illusion: the nobility will always find a way of being in control. It is a message meant to undermine bourgeois belief in social progress.

De Roberto uses the literary style of verismo (the Italian expression of literary Naturalism) and adopts no privileged point of view (neither the narrator's nor any other's), but instead displays a plurality of voices. Mass scenes are present, as well as the detailed description of various social backgrounds. The primary aim of all members of the Uzeda family is to retain power regardless of the changes that occur, even if this requires actions that the reader will undoubtedly judge to be cynical or even absurd. De Roberto portrays a world undergoing fundamental change, but which seemingly holds no hope for the future: no aspect of society is represented as free from corruption.
