= Forza Italia! (film) =

- Film poster
- Directed by: Roberto Faenza
- Music by: Ennio Morricone
- Release date: 1977
- Running time: 88 minutes
- Country: Italy
- Language: Italian

Forza Italia! (lit. Go Italy!) is a 1977 Italian documentary film directed by Roberto Faenza. The film offers an overview of 30 years of political life in Italy. Soon after its theatrical release, it was banned by the Italian Ministry of the Interior.

== Content ==
Using archive footage, the film encompasses the political life of Italy from 1947 until 1976.

== Ban ==
The film's very critical approach to Italian Christian Democracy led to its ban for 15 years in Italy.

== Reception ==
A retrospective review compares the film's approach to that of Blob, a political program of Raitre.
