= Federico De Roberto =

Italian writer

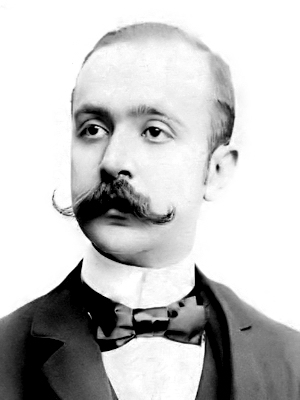
- Born: 16 January 1861; Naples, Kingdom of Italy
- Died: 26 August 1927 (aged 66); Catania, Kingdom of Italy
- Occupations: Novelist, journalist
- Writing career
- Notable work: The Viceroys
- Literary movement: Verismo

Federico De Roberto (16 January 1861 – 26 July 1927) was an Italian writer, who became well known for his historical novel The Viceroys (1894).

== Biography ==
Born in Naples, he moved as a child with his family to Catania, where he lived practically all of his life. He began his writing career working as a journalist for national newspapers, where he met Giovanni Verga and Luigi Capuana, the most prominent writers of the Verismo movement. Verga introduced him into the literary circles of Milan.

Like Capuana and Verga, De Robertohe too observed the psychological makeup of his characters in the light of the positivist science of his times. But in contrast to his older contemporaries, he emphasized less the power of human passions and desires than their relation to an inner world of illusion and deception in which, he believed, they originated. His collections of short stories, La sorte (1887), Documenti umani (1888), Processi verbali (1890), and L'albero della scienza (1890), all explore the psychological dimension of his characters' actions. His first novel, Ermanno Raeli (1889), is largely autobiographical, while L'illusione (1891) is devoted to a female protagonist and her illusion of love.

In 1894 his novel The Viceroys (Italian: I Viceré) was published. It was the result of years of hard work, but obtained little success upon its release. Disillusionment and nervous disorders induced De Roberto to resume journalistic work: he became a writer for the Corriere della Sera and the Giornale d'Italia. Only later, after some experience as a playwright, he returned to the novel, with L'Imperio (1908–1913), an unfinished sequel to I Viceré. The novel concentrated on the public and political life of Rome, viewed through the life of the reactionary Prince Consalvo, who, at the conclusion of The Viceroys, was elected to parliament by popular vote. In L'imperio, De Roberto takes his negative perspective to the extreme point of social and political nihilism. He died in Catania on 26 July 1927, at age 66.

== The Viceroys ==
De Roberto's 1894 novel consists of three parts and is based upon the story of the fictional Uzeda princes of Francalanza, a noble family of Catania of Spanish origins. This family served as viceroys during the previous Spanish rule of the Kingdom of Sicily. The plot, focusing on the social and political background of the time, follows the private history of the Uzedas during the last year of Bourbon domination in the Kingdom of the Two Sicilies and the first decades of the Kingdom of Italy, portraying the transition from feudalism to a parliamentary system.

De Roberto uses the literary style of verismo (the Italian expression of literary Naturalism) and adopts no privileged point of view (neither the narrator's nor any other's), but instead displays a plurality of voices.

The novel influenced Pirandello's I vecchi e i giovani and Giuseppe Tomasi di Lampedusa's The Leopard. It was adapted to cinema by director Roberto Faenza in 2007.

== Works ==
=== Monographs ===
- Leopardi. Milan: Fratelli Treves. 1898. (essays, criticism)
- Casa Verga e altri saggi verghiani. Florence: Le Monnier. 1964. (posthumous publication)

=== The Uzeda Family chronicles ===
- L'illusione. Milan: Libreria editrice Galli. 1891.
- I Viceré. Milan: Libreria editrice Galli. 1894., reprinted Milan: Aldo Garzanti, 1959; published in English as The Viceroys, London: MacGibbon & Kee, 1962, translated by Archibald Colquhoun. The Viceroys. Translated by Archibald Colquhoun. New York: Verso Books. 2016.
- L'Imperio. Milan: Mondadori. 1929. (posthumous publication)

=== Short story collections ===
- La sorte. Catania: Giannotta. 1887. (2nd edition) Milan: Libreria editrice Galli. 1892. (3rd edition) Milan: Fratelli Treves. 1910. (4th edition) Milan: Fratelli Treves. 1919.
- Documenti umani. Milan: Fratelli Treves. 1888. (2nd edition) Milan: Fratelli Treves. 1890 (4th edition) Milan: Libreria editrice Galli. 1896. (7th edition) Milan: Galli, Baldini & Castoldi. 1898.
- L'albero della scienza. Milan: Libreria editrice Galli. 1890.
- Processi verbali. Milan: Libreria editrice Galli. 1890.
- Ironie. Novelle. Milan: Fratelli Treves. 1920.

=== Letters ===
- Lettere a donna Marianna degli Asmundo. Edited by Sarah Zappulla Muscarà. Catania: Tringale. 1978.
- Federico De Roberto a Luigi Albertini. Lettere del critico al direttore del "Corriere della Sera". Edited by Sarah Zappulla Muscarà. Rome: Bulzoni. 1979.
- Lettere a Pia. Critical edition edited by Teresa Volpe. Rome: Aracne Editrice. 2013.

=== Poetry ===
- Encelado. Catania: Galatola. 1887 [May 1886].

=== Theatrical works ===
- Il Rosario (1912)
- La tormenta (1918, never staged) – dramatic treatment of Spasimo (Agony) from 1897
- La strada maestra (1913, never staged) – dramatic treatment of La messa di nozze from 1911

=== Other writings ===
- "Il passaggio del Nord-Est. Spedizione artica svedese; L'oceano artico ed i commerci della Siberia". Gazzetta d'Italia. Florence. 1879.
- Polemica Giosuè Carducci e Mario Rapisardi. Catania. Edited by Niccolò Giannotta 1881. (Literary debut)
- Arabeschi. Catania. Edited by Niccolò Giannotta. 1883. (Essays and criticism)
- Ermanno Raeli. Milan: Libreria editrice Galli. 1889. (2nd edition) Milan: Baldini, Castoldi & C. 1902. (Revised edition) Milan; Rome: Mondadori. 1923. (Novel)
- La morte dell'amore. Naples: Pierro. 1892. (Essay)
- L'amore. Fisiologia, psicologia, morale. Milan: Libreria editrice Galli. 1895. (Essay)
- "Spasimo". Corriere della Sera. Milan: Libreria editrice Galli. 1897. (Serial publication) Published in English as Agony. Translated by Andrew Edwards. New York: Italica Press. 2021.
- Gli amori. Milan: Libreria editrice Galli. 1898.
- Una pagina della storia dell'amore. Milan: Fratelli Treves. 1898.
- Il colore del tempo. Milan; Palermo: Sandron. 1900.
- Come si ama. Turin: Roux e Viarengo. 1900.
- L'arte. Turin: Bocca. 1901.
- Catania. Bergamo: Istituto italiano d'arti grafiche. 1907.
- Catania 1907 Expo. Illustrated album compiled under the direction of Federico De Roberto. Catania: Galatola. 1908.
- Randazzo e la Valle dell'Alcantara. Bergamo, Istituto italiano d'arti grafiche. 1909.
- La messa di nozze; Un sogno; La bella morte. Milan: Fratelli Treves. 1911.
- Le donne, i cavalier. Milan: Fratelli Treves. 1913.
- Al rombo del cannone. Milan: Fratelli Treves. 1919.
- La "Cocotte". Milan: Vitagliano. 1920. (Stories)
- All'ombra dell'olivo. Milan: Fratelli Treves. 1920.
- La paura. Catania: Battiato. 1922.
- L'amante dell'amore. Milan: Corbaccio. 1928. (Stories)
- Come Malta divenne inglese. Rome: La nuova antologia. 1940.
- Cronache per il Fanfulla. Milan: Quaderni dell'Osservatore. 1973.
- "Il trofeo di F. De Roberto. Inediti e rari". Le Ragioni Critiche. January–March 1974.
- Giustizia. Catania: Società di storia patria per la Sicilia orientale. 1975. (One-act play)
- La "Cocotte" e altre novelle di guerra. Edited by Sarah Zappulla Muscarà. Rome: Curcio. 1979.
- Adriana: Un racconto inedito e altri studi di donna. Catania: Maimone. 1998.
- Il tempo dello scontento universale. Turin: Aragno. 2012. (Various articles of literary and cultural criticism)
- La paura e altri racconti della Grande Guerra. Rome: Edizioni E/O. 2014.
- Novelle della Grande Guerra. Bari: Edizioni Progedit. 2015.
- Romanzi novelle e saggi. Edited by Carlo A. Madrignani for the collection I Meridiani. Milan: Arnoldo Mondadori Editore. 1984 ISBN 88-04-21988-2. ** Contains: (novels) L'illusione; I Viceré; L'Imperio; (stories) La sorte; La disdetta; Nel cortile; La malanova; (from Documenti umani) Documenti umani; Donato Del Piano; (from Processi verbali) Il rosario; I vecchi (from L'albero della scienza) La scoperta del peccato; Il gran rifiuto; Il paradiso perduto; La paura; (essays and prefaces) Leopardi e Flaubert; Carlo Baudelaire; Gustavo Flaubert – L'opera; Gustavo Flaubert – L'uomo; preface to Documenti umani; preface to Processi verbali; L'albero della scienza; Come si ama; Leopardi – La misantropia; chapter XV from Una pagina della storia dell'amore – Il matrimonio di Bismarck; Il volo di Icaro; Domenico Castorina e Giovanni Verga; (letters) to Ferdinando Di Giorgi; to his mother; to Luigi Albertini.

== Bibliography ==
- Rao, Ennio (1979). "The Short Fiction of Federico De Roberto from Romanticism to Decadentism". Romance Notes. 20 (2): 213–22. JSTOR 43801612.
- Ferroni, Giulio (1992). Profilo storico della letteratura italiana (in Italian). Milan: Einaudi scuola.
- De Roberto, Federico (1989) [1894]. The Viceroys. Vintage/Ebury. ISBN 0002718189.
- De Roberto, Federico (1998). Adriana: un racconto inedito e altri (in Italian). Catania: Giuseppe Maimone Editore.
- Zago, Nunzio (2000). Racconto della letteratura siciliana (in Italian). Catania: Giuseppe Maimone Editore.
- Julie Dashwood; Margherita Ganeri, eds. (2009). The Risorgimento of Federico De Roberto. Oxford: Peter Lang.
