= Marisa Belli =

Italian stage, television and film actress (1933–2017)

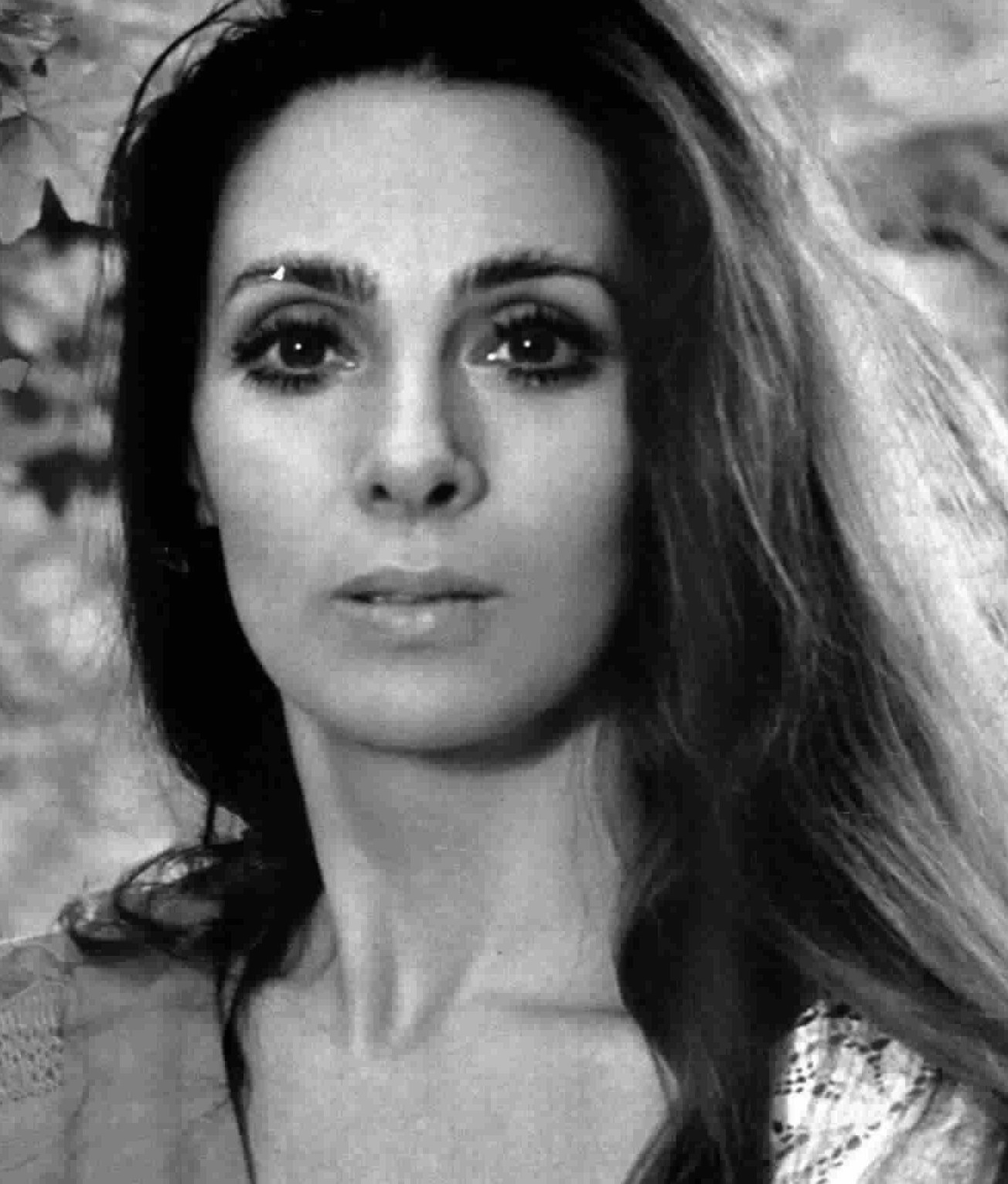
- Marisa Belli in Radiocorriere magazine, 1972
- Born: Maria Luisa Scavoni; 12 April 1933; Rome, Kingdom of Italy
- Died: 9 December 2017 (aged 84); Frosinone, Italy
- Occupation: Actress

Maria Luisa Scavoni (12 April 1933 – 9 December 2017), better known by her stage name Marisa Belli, was an Italian actress.

== Life and career ==
Born in Rome, at a young age Belli worked as an accountant and a secretary for several film production companies. After some experiences as a runway model, Belli was chosen by Pietro Germi for the role of Agrippina Solmo in Jealousy. Following a critical acclaim for her performance, she was subsequently able to secure similar roles.

From late 1950s Belli was mainly active on television and on stage, forming her own company in 1964.

Belli died in Frosinone, Italy, on 9 December 2017, aged 84.

== Selected filmography ==
- Jealousy (1953)
- The Awakening (1956)
- Serenata a Maria (1957)
- Seven in the Sun (1960)
- Hercules in the Haunted World (1961)
- L'onorata società (1961)
- Women of Devil's Island (1962)
- Disorder (1962)
- Avenger of the Seven Seas (1962)
- This Kind of Love (1972)
- Il corpo della ragassa (1979)
