= Federigo Tozzi =

Italian writer

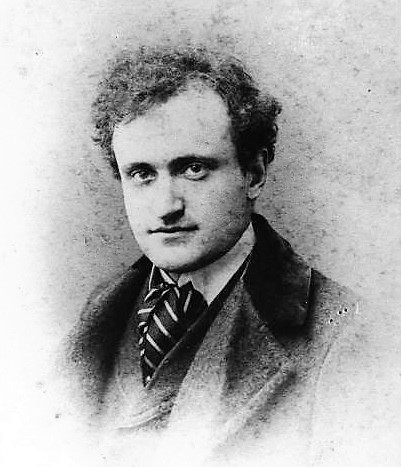
- Tozzi in 1910
- Born: 1 January 1883; Siena, Kingdom of Italy
- Died: 21 March 1920 (aged 37); Rome, Kingdom of Italy

Federigo Tozzi (born 1 January 1883 in Siena; died 21 March 1920 in Rome) was an Italian writer.

== Biography ==
He was the son of an innkeeper. Tozzi failed to complete his secondary education, and read his way into Italian literature in Siena public library. He initially worked as a railway official, but took over running the family inn after his father's death. In 1900 he founded the nationalist, bi-weekly magazine La Torre with his friend and long-time collaborator Domenico Giuliotti. His first published works were the undistinguished poems of La zampogna verde (1911) and La città della vergine (1913).

In 1914 he took up a precarious existence as a literary journalist in Rome, where he knew Pirandello, who subsequently supported him. His literary acquaintances expanded to include Grazia Deledda, Goffredo Bellonci, and Sibilla Aleramo. He now completed his most important works, Con gli occhi chiusi (1919), Tre croci (1920), and Il podere (1921). All three are deeply rooted in the countryside around Siena, which provides the setting and basic constraints for the characters, though there is also a strong autobiographical element deriving from Tozzi's conflicts with his peasant father. The narrative minutely investigates the passions and dysfunctions of individuals torn between greed and disabling psychological weaknesses as they struggle vainly to gain and hold onto property and to realize dreams that ultimately can only destroy them.

In literary terms Tozzi is indebted to the provincial Tuscan narrative tradition represented by Ferdinando Paolieri and Renato Fucini, but he also learnt from Verga and Dostoevsky, from the new psychology of William James, and from the neurological research of Paul Janet. His original blend of naturalism, psychologism, and autobiography had a strong influence on later Tuscan writers such as Benedetti, Bilenchi, Cassola, and Pratolini. Tozzi died in 1920 from a combination of influenza and pneumonia.

Though he was little known even in his homeland at the time of his death, in the following decades Tozzi came to be considered one of the first Italian modernists, and he was a powerful influence on later modernists. Italo Calvino considered him one of the great European writers of Italian descent. Tozzi's style is concise and laconic (Piper Verlag). According to Alberto Moravia, Tozzi was able to describe great tragedies with simple words.

== Works ==
- Bestie (1917)
- Con gli occhi chiusi (1919)
- Tre croci (1920) (Three Crosses, trans. R. Capellero, 1921)
- Il podere (1921)
- Gli egoisti (1923)
- Ricordi di un impiegato (1927)
- Novelle
- Bestie, cose, persone
