= Le Courrier français (1820–1851) =

- Categories: News and commentary
- Founded: 1819
- Final issue: 1851
- Country: France
- Language: French

Le Courrier français (French pronunciation: [lə kuʁje fʁɑ̃sɛ]) was a Liberal French journal that appeared from 1820 to 1851.

Following the Bourbon Restoration in 1814, when censorship was lifted the Doctrinaires were the only group without a political organ, since the Archives philosophiques had ceased publication. A group of writers and editors was formed to address the need including Pierre Paul Royer-Collard, de Barante, Jacques Claude Beugnot, François Guizot, Charles de Rémusat, Kératry and Narcisse-Achille de Salvandy. They founded Le Courrier on 21 June 1819 from the remains of the Annales politiques, which it immediately replaced.

The paper explained its mission in its first issue as being to combat the prejudices of the royalists and of the revolutionaries, to expose intrigues of both these parties, to carry the light of parties that supported the constitution, and to report the activities of politicians. The goal was not practical due to the divisions among the doctrinaires, and the original society was dissolved in the first months of 1820.

The paper changed its name to Le Courrier français with the issue of 1 February 1820. It merged with the Renommée. Subsequent writers or editors included Chatelain, Benjamin Constant, Étienne de Jouy, Jean-Pierre Pagès, Casimir Pierre Périer, Louis Marie de Lahaye de Cormenin, Dominique Dufour de Pradt, François-Adolphe Chambolle, Léon Faucher, Fréderic Bastiat Xavier Durrieu and the exiled Swedish regicide Adolph de Leuven (Ribbing). The Italian journalist Ferdinando Petruccelli della Gattina was another renowned collaborator. Le Courrier français became a leading journal, with a reputation for integrity and conviction. It exercised great influence until the end of the restoration and for a few years after 1830. It then went into decline. The last issue appeared on 14 March 1851.
