= Cronaca Bizantina =

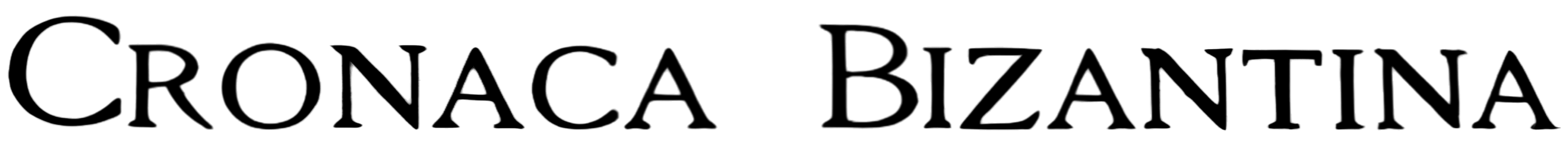

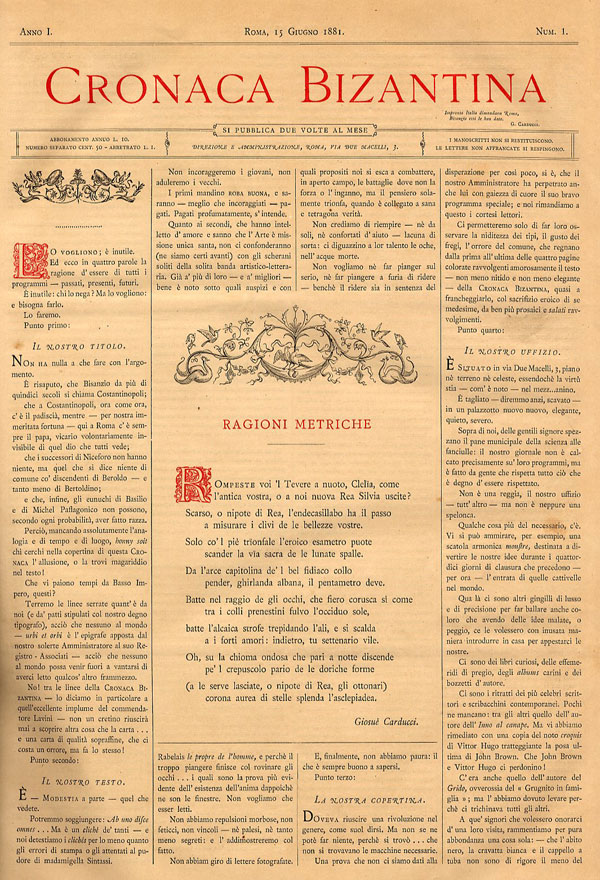
- First issue of Cronaca Bizantina (1881)
- Publisher: Angelo Sommaruga
- Founded: 1881
- First issue: 15 June 1881
- Final issue: 26 March 1886
- Based in: Rome
- Language: Italian

Cronaca Bizantina was an Italian biweekly magazine focusing on social and artistic topics. It was published in Rome from 1881 to 1886.

== History ==
The first issue of Cronaca Bizantina was published on 15 June 1881. The magazine's publisher was Angelo Sommaruga. The name of the periodical referred to the final stanza of Giosuè Carducci's poem 'Per Vincenzo Caldesi otto mesi dopo la sua morte' (To Vincenzo Caldesi Eight Months After His Death), in which the poet states that contemporary Italy brings to mind decaying Byzantium rather than mighty ancient Rome. The inaugural issue featured an elegiac distich by Carducci on the front page, praising ancient verse metres. Besides Carducci, the magazine's contributors included Luigi Capuana, Giovanni Verga, Olindo Guerrini and Gabriele D'Annunzio. The last issue of the magazine was published on 26 March 1886.
