= Domenico Giuliotti =

Italian writer (1877–1956)

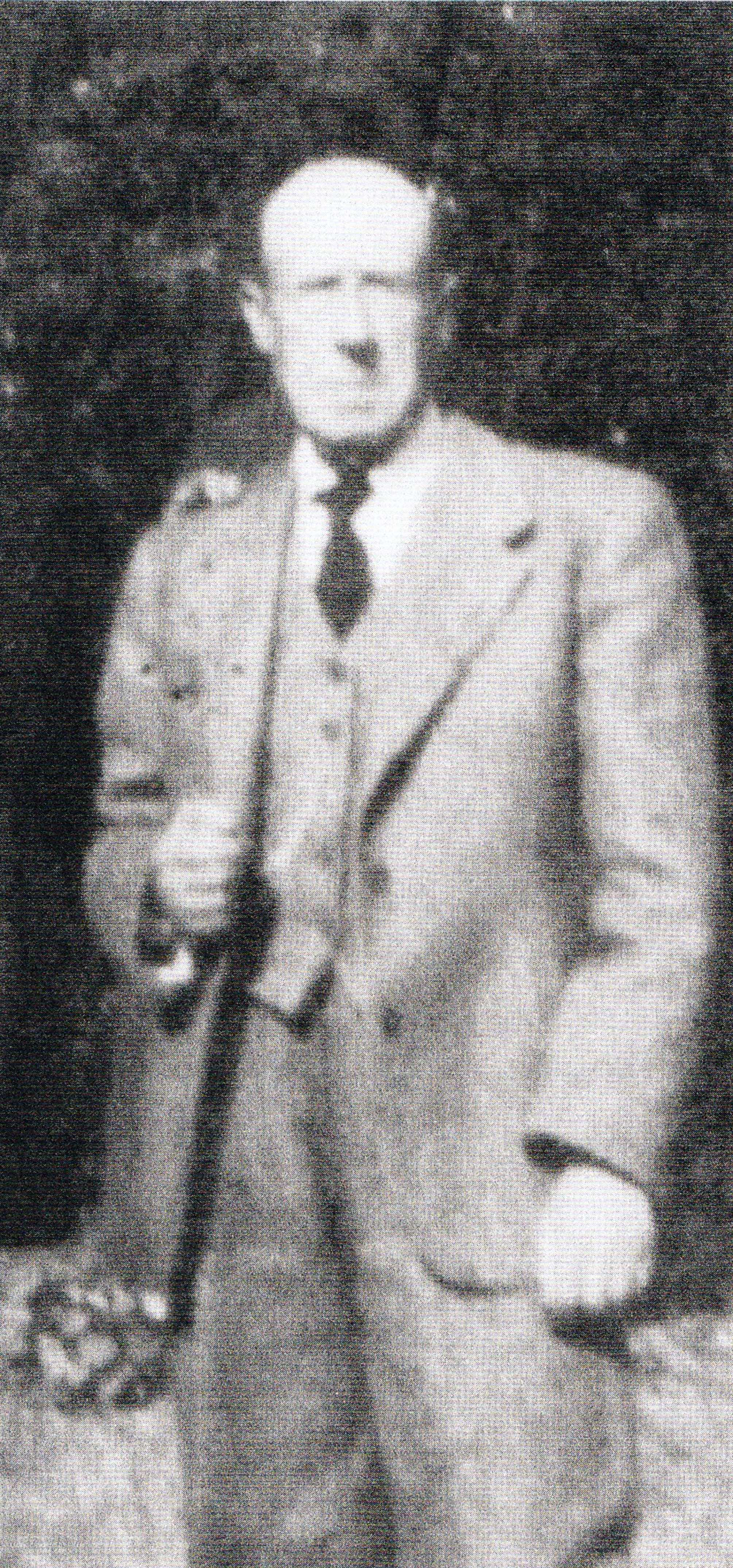
- Domenico Giuliotti
- Born: 18 February 1877; San Casciano in Val di Pesa, Kingdom of Italy
- Died: 12 January 1956 (aged 78); Greve in Chianti, Italy
- Occupations: Writer; Poet; Essayist
- Spouse: Zina Vestri (m. 1905)
- Writing career
- Language: Italian language
- Period: 20th century
- Genres: Novel; pamphlet; poetry
- Subject: Religion
- Notable works: L'ora di Barabba; Dizionario dell'omo salvatico
- Literary movement: Traditionalist conservatism

Domenico Giuliotti was an Italian writer and essayist. He was a dedicated Catholic and his rigidity and severity are reflected in his numerous works.

== Biography ==
Domenico Giuliotti was born in San Casciano in Val di Pesa, on 18 February 1877, on a farm only a few miles from the city of Florence. When he was barely old enough to go to school his parents sent him to live with an uncle, in a little hamlet near his birthplace. This uncle, Virgilio, was a notary public who had become the vice pretore of the district. As a magistrate he took pride in his judicial duties, and he and his wife, having no children of their own, hoped that some day their young nephew would follow in the footsteps of his jurist uncle. Consequently, Giuliotti, much against his inclinations, eventually went to Siena to study law. Before taking a degree he moved to Rome, under the pretext, as he explained to his family, that a degree conferred by the University of Rome, whose professors were renowned, carried with it more prestige than a degree from that of Siena.

During his university years Giuliotti began to exhibit strong anarchist and radical leanings. As the years went by, however, his outlook changed. He was terrified at the sight of the havoc wrought by the godless principles of a godless society with its worship of wealth and of everything that wealth can buy. The situation seemed hopeless, and Giuliotti was depressed almost to the point of despair, for it seemed to him that these diabolical principles were "preparing a generation capable of making hell turn pale." In his endeavor to find something to counteract these evils, Giuliotti wandered from one ideology to the other.

Finally, thanks to his reading the works of nineteenth century French Catholic traditionalist thinkers – De Maistre, De Bonald, Hello, Veuillot, Bloy – he went back to the faith of his childhood, "to the Eternal Church that commands and teaches from Rome," as his friend Giovanni Papini would later put it.

In 1913 Giuliotti founded the journal La Torre with his friend Federigo Tozzi and used it to express deeply reactionary Catholic views. The periodical was founded by Giuliotti and Tozzi with the express purpose of combatting socialism, anarchism, and everything opposed to the principles of the "Throne and the Altar." Giuliotti was also one of the major collaborators of Il Frontespizio, an important cultural magazine which gathered together noteworthy Italian writers like Piero Bargellini, Giovanni Papini and Ardengo Soffici.

Besides the well-known Dizionario dell'omo salvatico, written in collaboration with Papini, Giuliotti has published a score of books of poetry, tales and novels. Most of these are of a fragmentary nature, consisting of essays, sketches, book reviews, and journalistic articles such as an editor or a columnist might write. As one would expect, the spirit and the tone of these writings vary with the purpose and the content of the work. So much so, that as the French critic Marcel Brion says of Giuliotti, "in him one finds the sweetness of Jacopone da Todi, the severe and serious naturalism of Giotto's frescoes, the winged flight of Dante's terzine, and, often enough, a violence of reproach and satire that reminds one of Savonarola."

== Works ==
- Ombre d'un'ombra: Versi. Città di Castello: Soc. Tip. Ed. Cooperativa. 1910.
- Cecco Angiolieri (1914). Domenico Giuliotti (ed.). Le rime. Siena: Giuntini-Bentivoglio.
- L'ora di Barabba (1920; nuova ed. a cura di Luigi Castiglione, Roma, Logos, 1982).
- Domenico Giuliotti, ed. (1920). Antologia di cattolici francesi del secolo XIX (De Maistre, Bonald, Lamennais, Balzac, D'Aurevilly, Hello, Veuillot, Bloy). Lanciano: Carabba.
- Domenico Giuliotti; Giovanni Papini (1923). Dizionario dell'omo salvatico. Florence: Vallecchi.
- Poesie. Florence: Vallecchi. 1932.
- Iacopone da Todi. Florence: Vallecchi. 1939.
- Penne, pennelli, scalpelli. Florence: Vallecchi. 1942.
- Il cavallo volante, illustrazioni di Alessandro Brissoni, ed. Bernardo Cennini, Tip. Vallecchi, Firenze, 1945.
- L'ora di Barabba. Florence: Vallecchi. 1946.
- Giri d'arcolaio, disegni in nero di Piero Bernardini, tavole a colori di Giovanni Colacicchi, Le Monnier, Tip. E. Ariani, Firenze, 1948
- Domenico Giuliotti, ed. (1948). De Maistre. Florence: L'Arco.
- Il malpensante: pagine di fede, di lotta e d'amore scelte da Piero Bargellini. Florence: Vallecchi. 1957.
- Massimo Baldini, ed. (1977). Amare e credere. Vicenza: La Locusta.
- Massimo Baldini, ed. (1979). Le due luci: santità e poesia. Rome: Logos.
- Massimo Baldini, ed. (1980). Polvere dell'esilio. Rome: Logos.
- Lettere agli amici, a cura di Massimo Baldini, Piergiovanni Permoli, Ettore Tirinnanzi; introduzione di Geno Pampaloni, La Locusta, Vicenza, 1980.
- Raccontini rossi e neri. Rome: Logos. 1983.
- Massimo Baldini, ed. (1985). Nuovi pensieri d'un malpensante. Rome: Logos.
- Domenico Giuliotti e Giovanni Papini, Carteggio I (1913-1927), a cura di Nello Vian, prefazione di Carlo Bo, Edizioni di Storia e Letteratura, Roma, 1984; Carteggio II (1928-1939), a cura di Nello e Paolo Vian, ibidem, 1989; Carteggio III (1940–1955), a cura di Nello e Paolo Vian, ibidem, 1991.
- Massimo Baldini, ed. (1999). Tizzi e fiamme. Siena: Cantagalli.
- Domenico Giuliotti; Giovanni Papini (2000). Umilissime Scuse. Bologna: Marietti. ISBN 978-8821163074.
- Una rana nera e rara: scioglilingua, indovinelli, filastrocche e cantilene, scelti da Domenico Giuliotti. Florence: Chegai. 2001. ISBN 88-87671-18-4.
- Il Natale, a cura di Massimo Baldini, illustrazioni di Giacomo Napoli, Chegai, Firenze, 2001.

== Bibliography ==
- Mazza, Maria Serafina (1948). Not for Art's Sake: The Story of Il Frontespizio. New York: King's Crown Press.
- Hoehn, Matthew (1952). "Domenico Giuliotti". Catholic Authors: Biographical Sketches. 2. Newark: St. Mary's Abbey: 201–203.
- Baldini, Massimo (1981). Il più santo dei ribelli. Scritti su Domenico Giuliotti. Rome: Logos.
- Marchi, Marco. “Di Tozzi, Giuliotti e Altro.” La Rassegna della Letteratura Italiana 8, no. 3 (September-December 1991): 138-145.
- Izzi, Giuseppe (2001). "GIULIOTTI, Domenico". Dizionario Biografico degli Italiani (in Italian). Vol. 57: Giulini–Gonzaga. Rome: Istituto dell'Enciclopedia Italiana. ISBN 978-88-12-00032-6.
- O'Brien, C. (2002). "Giuliotti, Domenico". The Oxford Companion to Italian Literature. Oxford University Press. ISBN 978-0-19-818332-7.
- Farinelli, Giuseppe (2005). "Domenico Giuliotti cavaliere di Dio". Parole del sacro: l'esperienza religiosa nella letteratura italiana: atti del convegno internazionale, San Salvatore Monferrato 8-9 maggio 2003. Novara: Interlinea. pp. 225–242. doi:10.1400/200334.
- Martini, Luciano (2009). "Giuliotti cattolico antimoderno e apocalittico". Chiesa e cultura cattolica a Firenze nel Novecento. Rome: Edizioni di storia e letteratura. pp. 61–94. doi:10.1400/129662.
- Castelli, Ferdinando (2010). "Domenico Giuliotti e Federigo Tozzi". La Civiltà Cattolica. III (3841): 29–41.
