= Luigi Alberti =

19th-century Florentine writer

Luigi Alberti (1822–1898) was a Florentine journalist, writer, and playwright, mostly known for his works in the genre of comedy.

In 1863–66, he was the chief editor of the Firenze magazine. He was engaged in a passionate polemic with Olindo Guerrini and Giosuè Carducci who were apologists of the emerging Verismo. In his books Praefatio e Polemica novissima he argued that Guerrinians and Carduccians tainted souls of modern youth with Verismo, the movement that he understood as 'glorifying all things ugly, mean, and vulgar'.

His plays include "La ragazza di cervello sottile" (1870), "Asmodeo" (1886), "Pietro o la gente nuova" (1868) and "Capitano Anacleto Bruni" (1867).

The Luigi Alberti fund, kept at the National Central Library in Florence, consists of about one hundred items, including letters, telegrams, postcards, as well as various material related to his activity as a playwright; notes and printed material; manuscripts of plays by Alberti and other of his contemporaries.

== Sources ==
- De Gubernatis, Angelo (1879). Dizionario biografico degli scrittori contemporanei diretto da Angelo De Gubernatis (in Italian). Successori Le Monnier.
