= Mario Rigoni Stern =

Italian writer

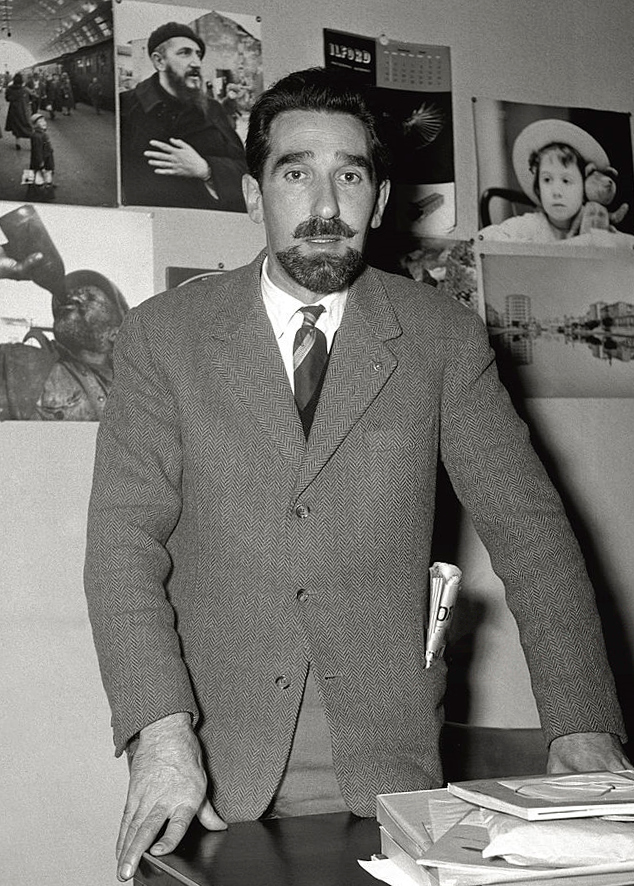
- Mario Rigoni Stern in 1958
- Born: 1 November 1921; Asiago, Italy
- Died: 16 June 2008 (aged 86); Asiago, Italy
- Occupation: Novelist
- Writing career
- Genre: World War II

Mario Rigoni Stern (1 November 1921 – 16 June 2008) was an Italian author and World War II veteran.

== Biography ==
He was born and grew up on the Asiago plateau in North East Italy. In 1938, after being rejected for service in the Navy, he enrolled in the tough Alpini advanced climbing/alpinism course in the Aosta Valley where Renato Chabod was among his teachers. Only four students graduated in that year. When German troops marched on Paris, his Alpini regiment was ordered to invade France from the Aosta Valley over the Little Saint Bernard Pass, a foray which he later described in the first part of his novel Quota Albania. He would then partake in the invasion of Albania and Greece, events which are detailed later in the book.

His first novel Il sergente nella neve, published in 1953 (and the following year in English as The Sergeant in the Snow), draws on his own experience as a sergeant major in the Alpini corps during the disastrous retreat from Russia in World War II. It is his only work to be translated into English and Spanish. He would later say that having managed to make it back to Italy with all 70 of the men under his command was his finest achievement.

His Sergeant in the Snow was later packaged by the Alfred A. Knopf publishing house into a collection of Italian war novels, along with entries by Renzo Biaison (The Army of Love) and Mario Tobino (The Deserts of Libya).

Other well-known works also include Le stagioni di Giacomo (Giacomo's Seasons), Storia di Tönle (The Story of Tönle), and the collection of short stories Sentieri sotto la neve (Paths Beneath the Snow).

His novels which are strongly autobiographical are strongly rooted in the natural world with acute observations about life and wildlife in the mountains. Rigoni Stern was an enthusiastic mountaineer and hunter with an acute sense of the wonder of the natural world, an aspect best exemplified by his novel Il bosco degli urogalli (The Wood of the Black Grouse).

== Awards and honours ==
- He was awarded the Premio Campiello and the Premio Bagutta for Storia di Tönle, and the Italian PEN prize for Sentieri sotto la neve.
- Asteroid 12811 Rigonistern was named in his honour. The official naming citation was published by the Minor Planet Center on 1 May 2003 (M.P.C. 48394).
- The silver medal for the Russian Campaign

== Works ==
- Il sergente nella neve (1953), translated into English as The Sergeant in the Snow (1954)
- Il bosco degli urogalli (1962)
- Quota Albania (1971)
- Ritorno sul Don (1973)
- Storia di Tönle (1978), translated into English as The Story of Tonle (1998, 2012)
- Uomini, boschi e api (1980)
- L'anno della vittoria (1985)
- Amore di confine (1986)
- Arboreto salvatico (1991)
- Le stagioni di Giacomo (1995)
- Sentieri sotto la neve (1998)
- Inverni lontani (1999)
- Tra due guerre e altre storie (2000)
- L'ultima partita a carte (2002)
- Stagioni (2006)
