= Renato Fucini =

Italian writer and poet

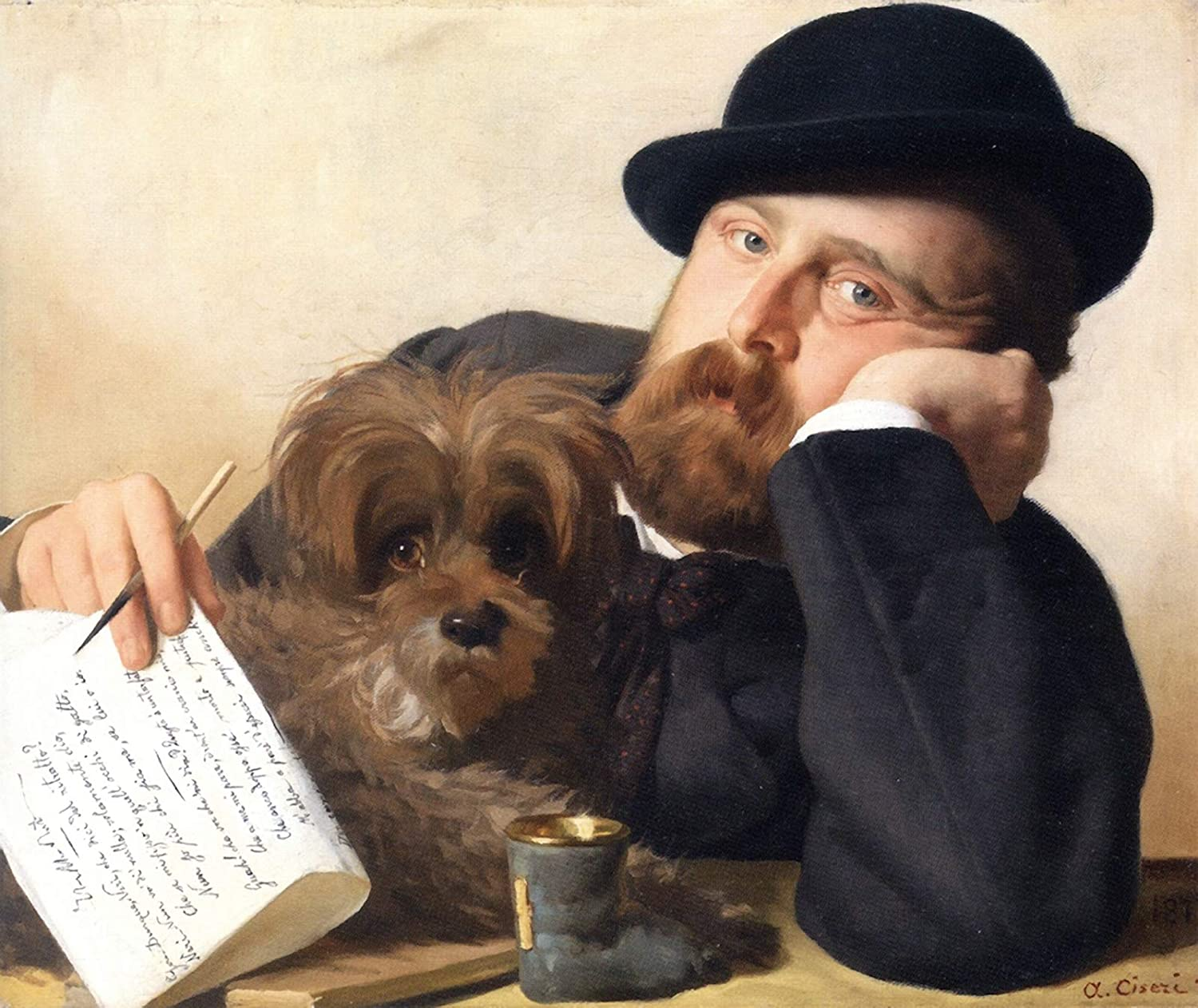
Portrait of Renato Fucini by Antonio Ciseri

Renato Fucini (8 April 1843 – 25 February 1921) was an Italian writer and poet.

== Life and works ==
In 1871 Fucini published his first literary work, the collection of comic poems in Pisan dialect Cento sonetti in vernacolo pisano. On Pasquale Villari's suggestion, he visited Naples and published his impressions of popular life there as Napoli ad occhio nudo (1877). From now onwards he specialized in the prose sketch, or bozzetto. First published in the Rassegna settimanale, his bozzetti of rural Tuscany were gathered in the much reprinted Le veglie di Neri (1882). A second collection, All'aria aperta, did not appear until 1897.

Fucini's verbal sketches have frequently been compared to the impressionistic paintings of the Macchiaioli, whom he frequented. He was much anthologized and imitated by writers like Ferdinando Paolieri, but his importance was subsequently questioned. Marxist critics argued that he portrayed peasants as unintelligent and self-interested, and lacked the moral and political commitment of true veristi. This, however, is to overlook his moderate reformism and genuine compassion for suffering. His best bozzetti, such as ‘Il matto delle giuncaie’, convey an authentically tragic world-view, and others – ‘Scampagnata’, for example – mock the parochialism of the country bourgeoisie.
