= I Viceré (film) =

- Directed by: Roberto Faenza
- Written by: Roberto Faenza; Francesco Bruni; Andrea Porporati
- Based on: The Viceroys Federico De Roberto
- Produced by: Elda Ferri
- Starring: Alessandro Preziosi; Lando Buzzanca; Cristiana Capotondi; Guido Caprino
- Cinematography: Maurizio Calvesi
- Edited by: Massimo Fiocchi
- Music by: Paolo Buonvino
- Distributed by: 01 Distribution
- Release date: 2007
- Running time: 120 minutes
- Country: Italy
- Language: Italian

I Viceré is a 2007 Italian historical drama film directed by Roberto Faenza. It is based on the novel with the same name written by Federico De Roberto. For his performance Lando Buzzanca won the Globo d'oro for best actor. The film also won four David di Donatello awards and two Silver Ribbons.

== Plot ==
Uzeda, a Sicilian family faithful to the Bourbon kings, with the Unification of Italy in 1861 and the rise to power of Giuseppe Garibaldi and Vittorio Emanuele II, begins to lose his power, although Sicily remains in the hands of Prince Giacomo (Giacomo Uzeda).

== Cast ==
- Alessandro Preziosi as Consalvo Uzeda di Francalanza
- Lando Buzzanca as Prince Giacomo Uzeda di Francalanza
- Cristiana Capotondi as Teresa Uzeda
- Guido Caprino as Giovannino
- Assumpta Serna as Duchess Radalì
- Sebastiano Lo Monaco as Duke Gaspare
- Giselda Volodi as Lucrezia
- Franco Branciaroli as Count Raimondo
- Lucia Bosè as Donna Ferdinanda
- Paolo Calabresi as Benedetto Giulente
- Biagio Pelligra as Baldassarre
- Giovanna Bozzolo as Graziella
- Pep Cruz as don Blasco
- Jorge Calvo as Michele Radalì
- Anna Marcello as Chiara
- Katia Pietrobelli as Donna Margherita
- Magdalena Grochowska as Donna Isabella
- Maria Rita Fenzato as Matilde
- Mario Pupella as Garino
- Vito as Friar Carmelo
- Antonio Cantafora

== See also ==
- List of Italian films of 2007
