= Olindo Guerrini =

Italian poet

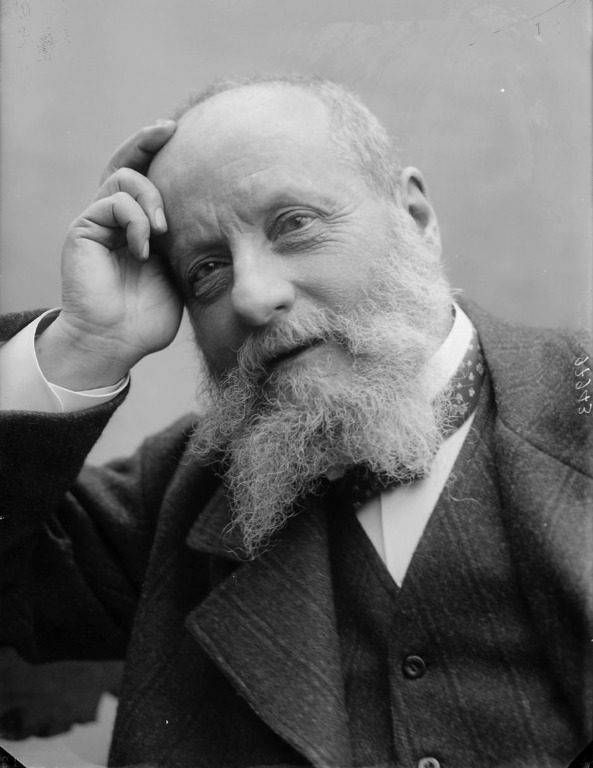
Olindo Guerrini

Olindo Guerrini (14 October 1845 - 21 October 1916) was an Italian poet who also published under the pseudonyms Lorenzo Stecchetti and Argìa Sbolenfi.

He was born at Forlì, but grew up in Sant'Alberto, Ravenna, and after studying law took to a life of letters, becoming eventually librarian at Bologna University. In 1877 he published postuma, a volume of canzoniere under the name of Stecchetti, following this with Polemica (1878), Alcuni canti popolari romagnoli (1880) and other poetical works, and becoming known as the leader of the verist school among Italian lyrical writers.
