= Mario Tobino =

Italian writer and psychiatrist (1910–1991)

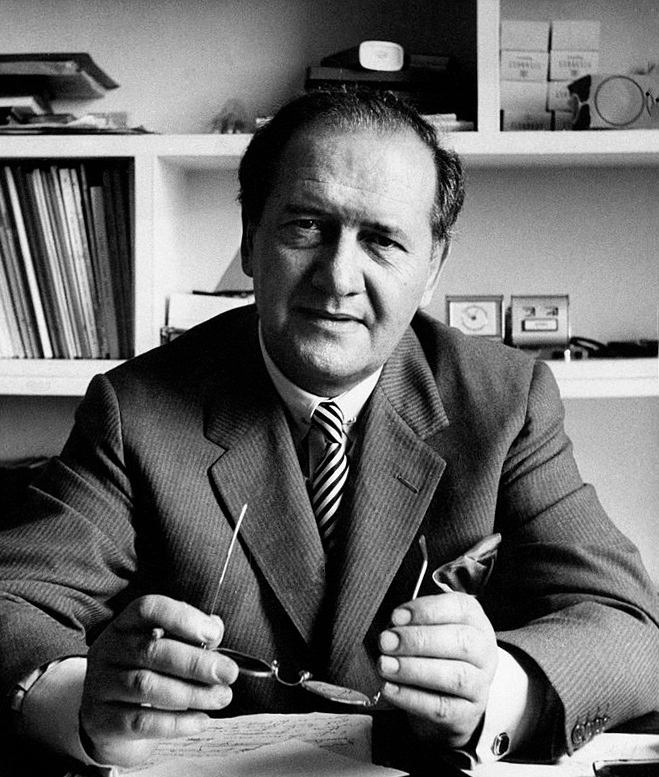
Mario Tobino in 1962

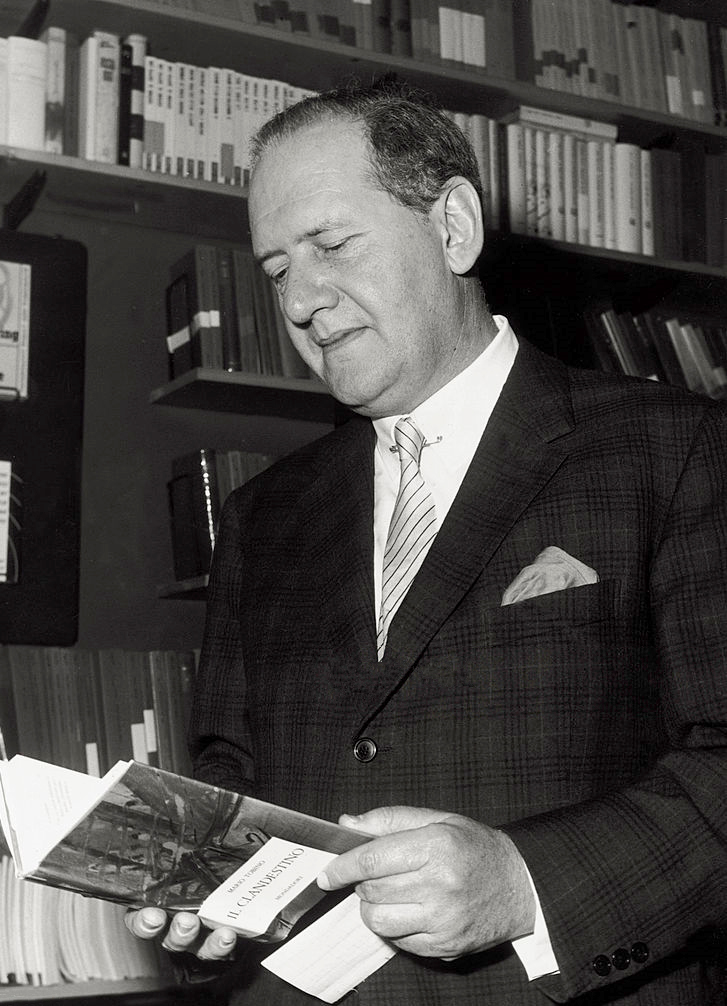
Mario Tobino in 1965

Mario Tobino (16 January 1910, Viareggio, Province of Lucca, Tuscany – 11 December 1991, Agrigento) was an Italian poet, writer and psychiatrist.

A prolific writer, he began as a poet but later wrote mostly novels. His works are characterized by a strong autobiographical inspiration and usually deal with social and psychological themes.

== Education ==
Mario Tobino completed his degree in medicine in 1936, after which he embarked on a career that centred on the mental hospital setting, treating people with mental disabilities.

== Medical career ==
Mario Tobino's work took him to Libya in June 1940. He worked as a doctor in Libya until October 1941, when war broke out in the country and he had to flee. His experience of Libya was recorded in the book Il deserto della Libia, which came out in 1952.

In 2015, Staging Memory by Stefania Del Monte dedicated a whole section to the book.

After returning from Libya, Tobino took the job of doctor in the Mental Hospital of Lucca. He worked in the hospital for over four decades.

== Works ==
The period between the spring and autumn of 1944 saw Tobino become an ardent supporter of the war of national liberation. His participation in the liberation efforts as a partisan developed him immensely as a writer. The experience morphed into the book Clandestino, which was published in 1962 and won him the Premio Strega. Tobino had published books before Clandestino. In 1953, he brought out Libere donne di Magliano, a work that established his place among important Italian writers. Tobino wrote another prize-winning book in 1972. His Per le antiche scale was the winner of the Premio Campiello that year. Tobino was a tireless writer. He was prolific even in his later life. In 1982 he published Gli ultimi giorni di Magliano, followed by La ladra in 1984 and in 1988 Tre amici. This last phase of his writing career was also marked by several literary prizes. He received the Premio Pirandello on 10 December 1991 in Agrigento. The next day he died.

== English translations ==
- Il deserto della Libia (1951) - The deserts of Libya, trans. Archibald Colquhoun and Antonia Cowan, in Three Italian War Novels (Knopf, 1967)
- Le libere donne di Magliano (1953) - The Women of Magliano, trans. Archibald Colquhoun (Putnam's, 1954)
- Il Clandestino (1962) - The Underground, trans. Raymond Rosenthal (Heinemann, 1966)
