= Verismo (literature) =

Italian literary movement

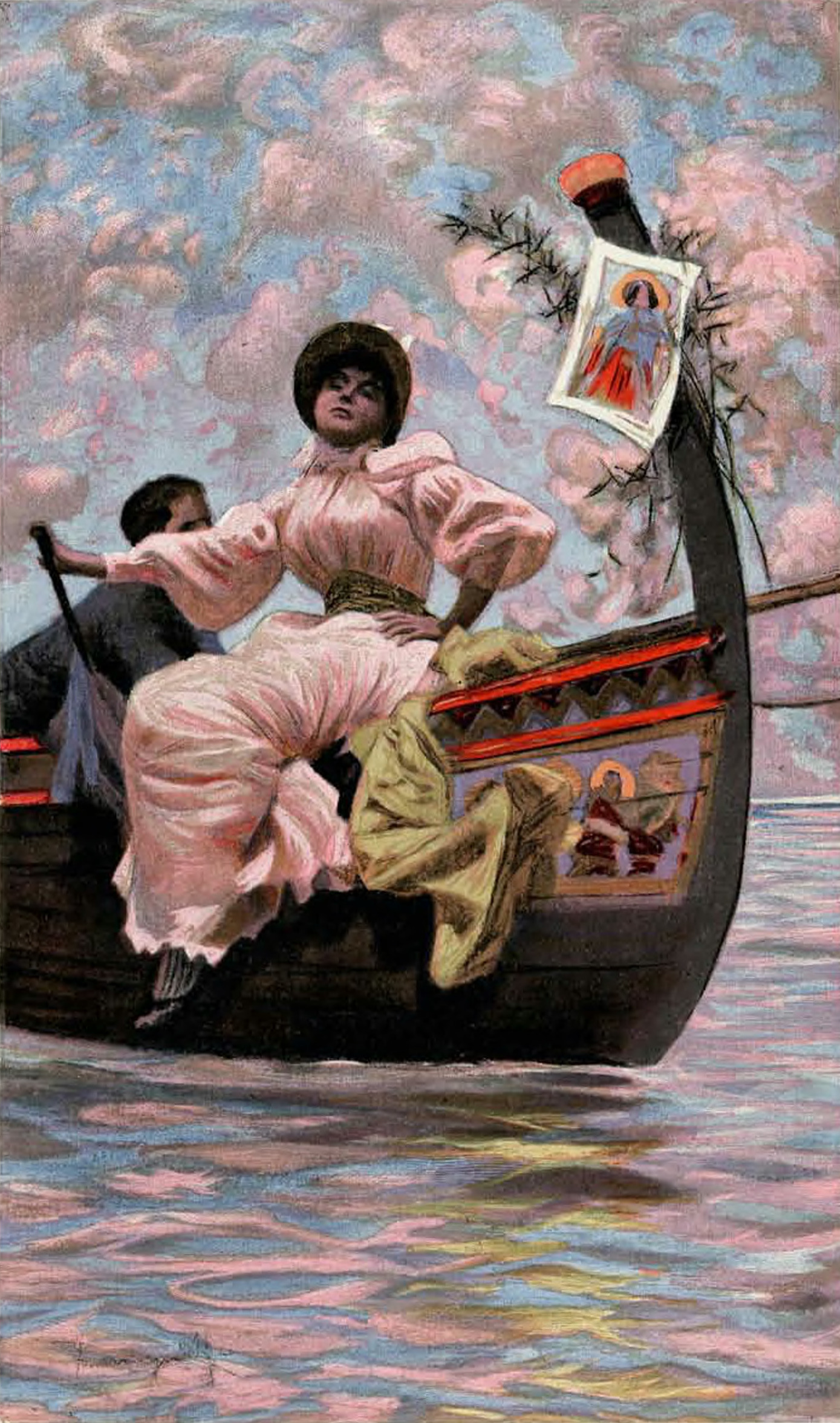
Illustration for the Treves edition of Giovanni Verga's Vita dei campi, Milan, 1897

Verismo (Italian for 'realism', from vero, 'true') was an Italian literary movement which peaked between approximately 1875 and the early 1900s. Sicilian writers Giovanni Verga, Luigi Capuana and Federico De Roberto were its main exponents. In 1879, Capuana published the novel Giacinta, generally regarded as the "manifesto" of Italian verismo. Unlike French naturalism, which was based on positivistic ideals, Verga and Capuana rejected claims of the scientific nature and social usefulness of the movement. D. H. Lawrence was influenced by Italian verismo, and translated several of Verga's works into English.

== Description ==
=== Origin ===
Literary verismo was begun around 1875 and 1895 by a group of writers – mostly novelists and playwrights. It did not constitute a formal school, but it was still based on specific principles. Its birth was influenced by a positivist climate which put absolute faith in science, empiricism and research and which developed from 1830 until the end of the 19th century. It was also clearly based on naturalism, a literary movement which spread in France in the mid-19th century. Naturalist writers included Émile Zola and Guy de Maupassant; for them, literature should objectively portray society and humanity like a photograph, strictly representing even the humblest social class in even its most unpleasant aspects, with the authors analysing real modern life like scientists.

=== Main figures ===
Literary verismo developed in the fruitful urban cultural life of Milan, which brought together intellectuals from different areas, but tended to portray central and southern Italian life – Sicily is described in the works of Verga, Capuana and Federico De Roberto, Naples in works by Matilde Serao and Salvatore Di Giacomo, Sardinia in the works of Grazia Deledda, Rome in the poems of Cesare Pascarella and Tuscany in works by Renato Fucini.

Verismo, however, exerted some influence also in northern Italy. In Lombardy Emilio De Marchi attempted to reconcile the Manzonian tradition with verismo by describing the lives of the lower middle class, most notably in Demetrio Pianelli (1888). In the North there was also some cross-fertilization between verismo and the Scapigliatura in, for instance, Remigio Zena's La bocca del lupo (1892), Gian Pietro Lucini's Gian Pietro da Core (1885), and Paolo Valera's La folla (1901).

Though its key proponents were primarily novelists, a certain form of verismo is also visible in verse: Lorenzo Stecchetti (Olindo Guerrini) makes deliberate attempts to shock in his treatment of erotic and social themes, and Vittorio Betteloni writes about the bourgeoisie in a deliberately prosaic manner. In the theatre it was again Verga who established veristic drama, with the 1884 stage version of Cavalleria rusticana, which was a personal triumph for the actress Eleonora Duse. Another prominent exponent of veristic drama was the poet and librettist Giuseppe Giacosa, a close friend of Verga's.

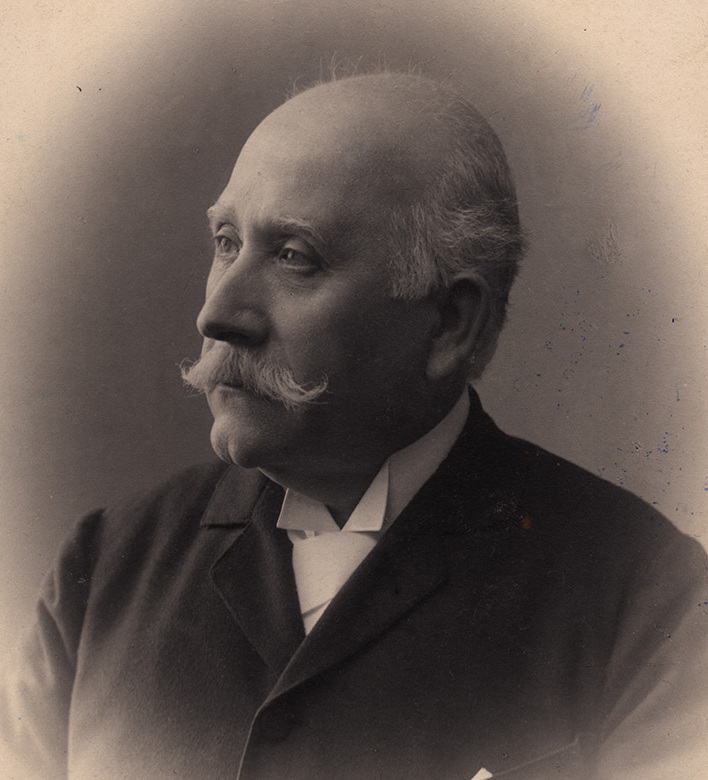
Luigi Capuana, one of the main exponents of verismo in literature, and the author of the novel Giacinta, generally regarded as the "manifesto" of the movement.

The first author to theorize on Italian verismo was Capuana, who theorized the "poetry of the real" – thus Verga, at first part of the late Romantic literary movement (he was called the poet of the duchesses and had considerable success), later shifted to verismo with his short story collections Vita dei campi and Novelle rusticane and finally with the first novel of the 'Ciclo dei Vinti' cycle, I Malavoglia in 1881. Sicilian-born, Verga lived in Florence during the same period as the verismo painters – 1865 to 1867 – and his best known story, "Cavalleria rusticana", contains certain verbal parallels to the effects achieved on canvas by the Tuscan landscape school of this era. "Espousing an approach that later put him in the field of verismo, his particular sentence structure and rhythm have some of the qualities of the macchia. Like the Macchiaioli, he was fascinated by topographical exactitude set in a nationalist framework" – to quote from Albert Boime's work, The Art of the Macchia and the Risorgimento. Verga and verismo differed from naturalism, however, in their desire to introduce the reader's point of view on the matter while not revealing the author's personal opinions.

The movement had its detractors as well. For example, the Florentine journalist and playwright Luigi Alberti considered verismo to be polluting the minds of young people with ‘everything ugly, mean, and vulgar’ that existed in real life.

=== Principles ===
The principles of canonical verismo are as follows: (1) the form must be impersonal; (2) the language and style must accord with the subject matter (if the setting is working-class, so too must be the lexis and the syntax); (3) the aim is to study modern Italy from the lowest classes to the highest; (4) the method must be scientific, based on a study of the environment (social, economic, geographical, etc.) and in accordance with the determinist criteria theorized by positivist authors such as Lombroso. Verismo differs in important ways from French naturalism: (1) the stylistic aspects of the literary work are emphasized more than scientific ones; (2) it is less manual workers and the city environment which are represented than the peasantry and provincial life.

=== Legacy ===
The early novels of Gabriele D'Annunzio, Terra vergine and Novelle della Pescara, were heavily influenced by verismo. Traces of the poetics of verismo persist in the early Pirandello, in Il turno, L'esclusa, and his first novelle, and, a little later, in the Tuscan Federigo Tozzi. The work of verist writers like De Roberto influenced Giuseppe Tomasi di Lampedusa's The Leopard. But the major subsequent influence was on Neorealism (1943–55).

== See also ==
- Verismo (music)
- Verismo (painting)

== Sources ==
- McWilliam, G. H. (1961). "Verga and 'Verismo'". Hermathena. 95 (95): 3–20. JSTOR 23040137.
- Luperini, Romano (2002). "Verismo". The Oxford Companion to Italian Literature. Oxford: Oxford University Press.
- Raboni, Giulia (2014). "Il verismo". In Umberto Eco (ed.). Storia della civiltà europea (in Italian). Rome: Istituto dell'Enciclopedia Italiana.
- Williams, Simon (2003). "Verismo". The Oxford Encyclopedia of Theatre and Performance. Oxford: Oxford University Press.
