= Luigi Capuana =

Italian author and journalist

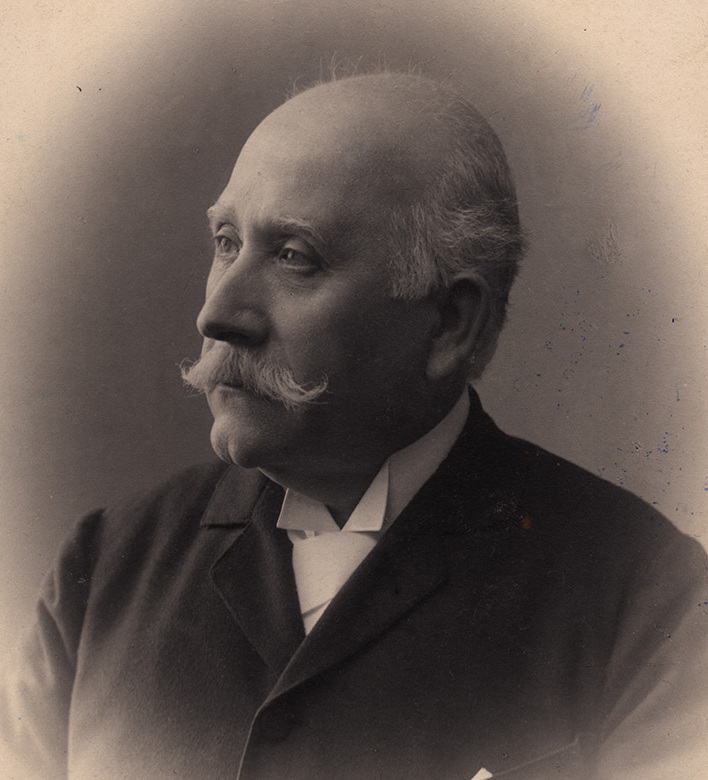
- Luigi Capuana
- Born: 28 May 1839 Mineo, Kingdom of the Two Sicilies
- Died: 29 November 1915 (aged 76) Catania, Kingdom of Italy
- Occupation: Novelist; Journalist; Playwright; Academic
- Genres: Novel; short story
- Literary movement: Verismo
- Notable works: Giacinta; The Marquis of Roccaverdina
- Spouse: Adelaide Bernardini (m. 1908)

Signature
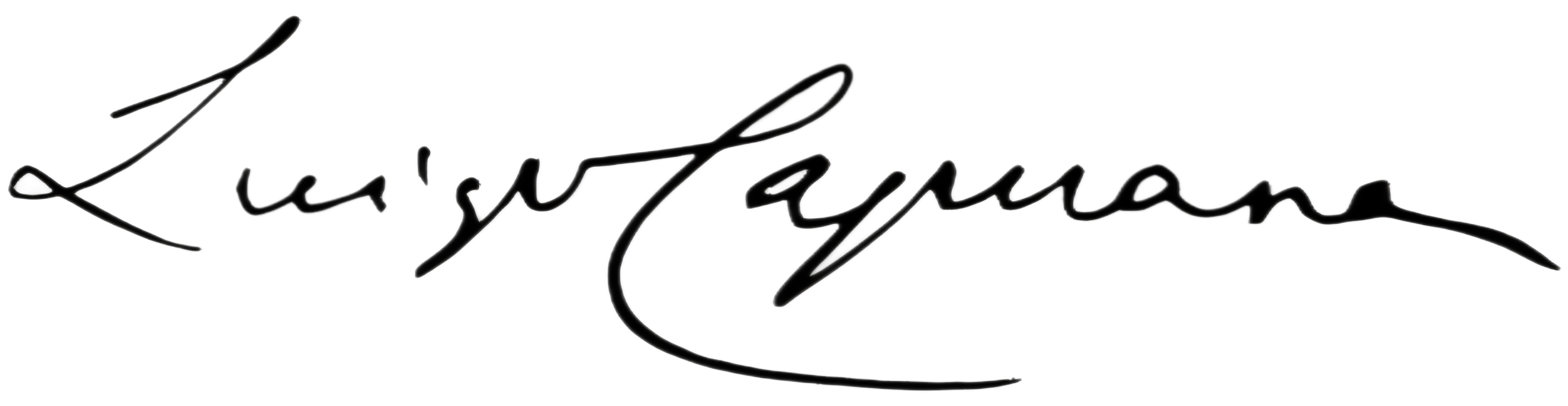

Luigi Capuana (May 28, 1839 – November 29, 1915) was an Italian author and journalist and one of the main exponents of Verismo. He was a contemporary of Giovanni Verga, both having been born in the province of Catania within a year of each other. He was also one of the first Italian authors influenced by the works of Émile Zola, French author and creator of naturalism. His critical theories on naturalism envisaged the ultimate fusion of the novel into a purely scientific, impersonal, case-history.

== Biography ==
=== Early life and education ===
Luigi Capuana was born in Mineo, in the Province of Catania, the first of eight children. His family was wealthy, and owned property in the area. He attended the local school. In 1851 he enrolled in the Royal College of Bronte, Catania, but left after only 2 years because of bad health. However, he continued to study by teaching himself. Politically, Capuana was far more liberal than his parents, imbued as he was with a patriotism that was genuinely militant.

After graduating he enrolled in the Faculty of Law at Catania in 1857. He abandoned his studies in 1860 in order to take part in the uprising roused by Garibaldi's expedition. He became secretary of the Secret Committee of Insurrection in Mineo, and later chancellor of the nascent civic council.

=== "Literary Adventures" ===
In 1861 Capuana released the "dramatic legend" Garibaldi in three cantos, published in Catania by Galatola. In 1864 he settled in Florence, where he spent four productive years, making friends with writers and intellectuals, most notably the poet Aleardo Aleardi, and working as theatre critic for the newspaper La Nazione. It was a rich, valuable apprenticeship, for it afforded him with the opportunity of acquainting himself with several other literatures, particularly the French. In 1867, he published serially in a Florentine daily his first novella, entitled Dr. Cymbalus, which took Dumas fils' La boîte d'argent as a model.

=== Return to Sicily ===
In 1868 Capuana returned to Sicily planning a brief stay, but his father's death and economic hardship anchored him to the island. He worked as a school inspector and later as counselor of Mineo until he was elected as mayor of the town. During these years he devoted himself to the study of the works of Hegel and de Sanctis. He was especially inspired by Dopo la Laurea (1868), an essay by positivist and Hegelian doctor Angelo Camillo De Meis, who had developed a theory on the evolution and death of literary genres.

=== The birth of Verismo ===
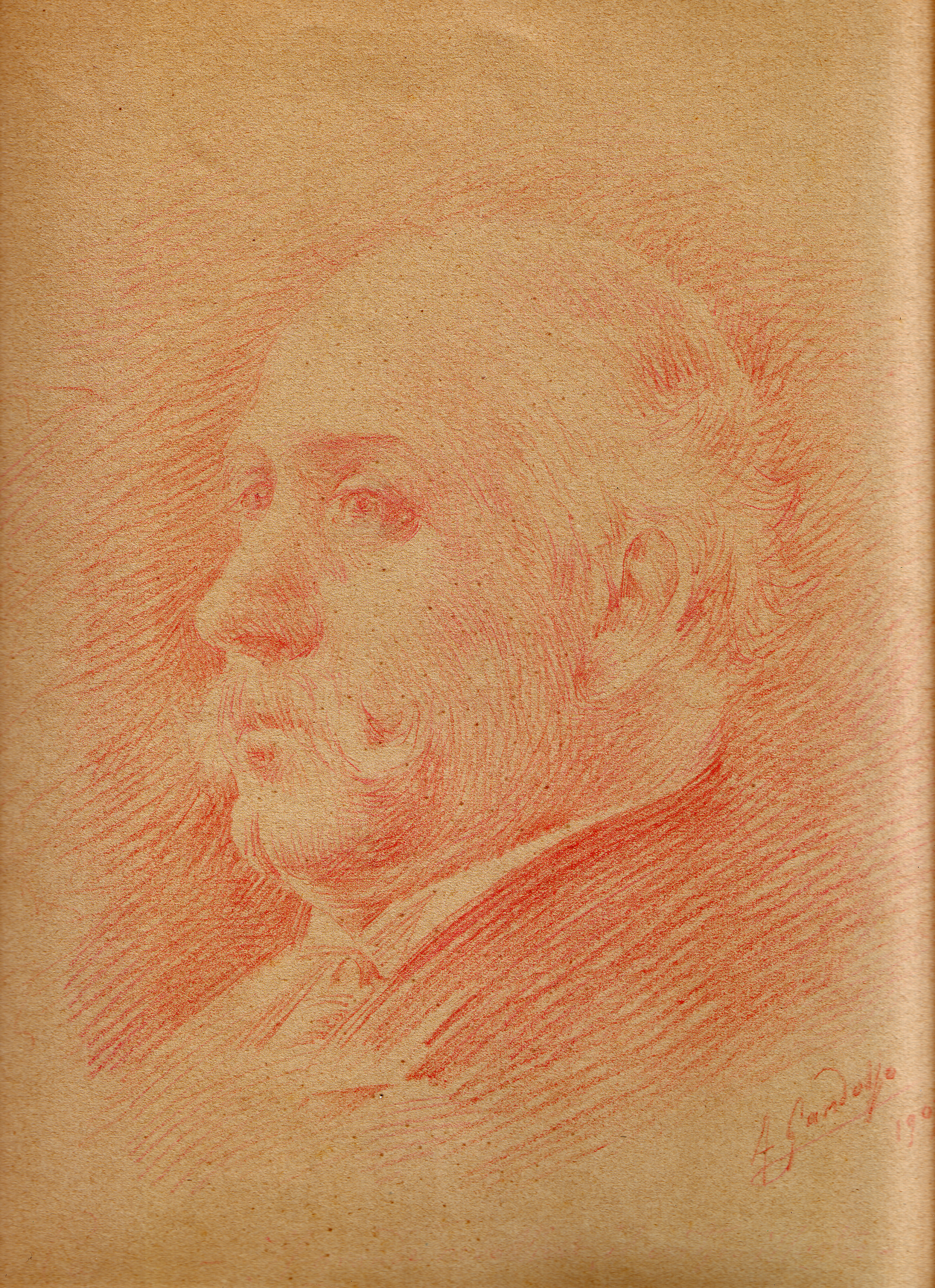
Portrait of Luigi Capuana by Antonino Gandolfo

In 1875, following a seven-year stay in his native Mineo, Capuana moved to Milan, where he worked as literary and drama critic for the newspaper Il Corriere della Sera and wrote for the prestigious review La Nuova Antologia. In Milan he had the good fortune of meeting a fellow Sicilian, Giovanni Verga, who soon became his best friend. Their friendship was to prove very important when Verga published his first great novel, I Malavoglia, a work strenuously and effectively praised by Capuana.

During his conversations with Verga in Milan, Capuana became concerned with the creation of a new literature attentive to social and psychological truth (‘il vero’). He took as his model the experimental method elaborated in France by Émile Zola, according to which the writer, in imitation of the scientist, observed reality impassively without inquiring into its ultimate causes.

In the late 1870s Capuana published his first important works: the collection of short stories Profili di donne (1877), the critical essay Il teatro italiano contemporaneo (1877), and, above all, his first novel, Giacinta (1879), which is considered a landmark in Italy's naturalist tradition.

The influence of Zola on Giacinta, is apparent. The work is dedicated to him, and reflects both Zola's and his own belief that modern studies of heredity had made it possible to understand both the unity and variety of human life. Capuana's naturalism consisted much less in scientific and photographic accuracy than in the depiction of the individual as a product of the laws of nature and heredity. It also lent to Zola's Positivism a strong aesthetic dimension, in the belief that the work of art perfects science by giving a life to characters and events that is more complete that anything that scientific testing could provide. Capuana thus held that the novel was the work of both science and art in that it made possible the representation of case studies of eccentric people and situations within the general, determining conditions of life.

Another fundamental characteristic of the naturalistic novel had to be the impersonality of art, the rigid suppression, that is, in as far as possible of the writer's own personality and private views when telling a story. Capuana and Verga achieved the effect of the "invisible author" through stylistic devices such as choral narration – where events are reported through the comments of the village – or free indirect discourse and interior monologue – where the characters' thoughts are related as events and there is a constant shift between direct and indirect representation.

=== In Rome ===
In 1882 Capuana was appointed Professor of Italian literature at the Women's Teachers College in Rome, where he met the young Luigi Pirandello. He contributed to such prominent literary magazines as Fanfulla della domenica and Cronaca Bizantina and established close relationships with leading critics and writers like Gabriele D'Annunzio.

In 1901 he published his masterpiece, The Marquis of Roccaverdina (Italian: Il marchese di Roccaverdina), the story of the descent into madness of a Sicilian marquis, who, having killed his mistress's husband out of jealousy, is gradually driven to insanity by the guilt he suffers. Both in Giacinta and in the more complex The Marquis of Roccaverdina, Capuana takes as his focus the psychology of a protagonist whose actions contest immutable social norms and who is destined to meet defeat in madness and death.

=== Catania: work at university and death ===
In 1902 Capuana was appointed professor of lexicography and statistics at the University of Catania. On April 23, 1908 he married the writer Adelaide Bernardini. Capuana died in Catania on November 29, 1915, shortly after Italy entered the First World War. His last literary works included Coscienze (1905), Nel paese di Zàgara (1910), and Gli Americani di Rabbato (1912).

Capuana was a very prolific writer. In addition to his novels, he wrote collections of short stories (e.g. Le paesane, 1894), many very successful children's fables (e.g. C'era una volta, 1882; Scurpiddu, 1898), and several Sicilian-dialect plays (published collectively in Teatro dialettale siciliano, Palermo, 1911-12, vols. 1-3; Catania, 1920-1, vols. 4-5). Capuana's plays in standard Italian and in the Sicilian dialect include Giacinta (1888), an adaptation of his major novel; Malia (Enchantment, 1895); Il cavaliere Pidagna (1911).

== Main works ==
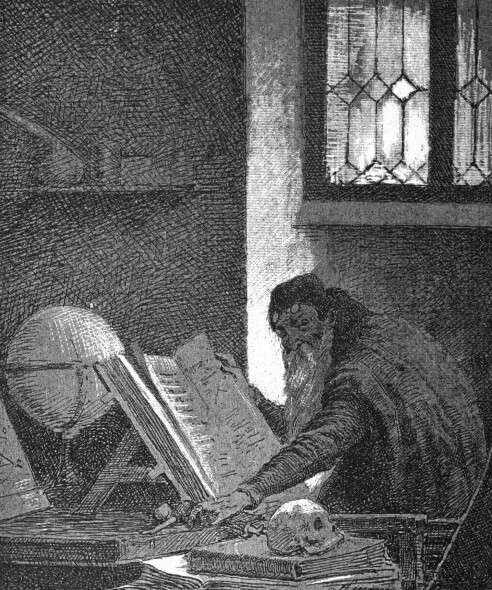
Illustration from Capuana's Il raccontafiabe, Florence, R. Bemporad & figlio

- Giacinta, Milan, 1879;
- Studi sulla letteratura contemporanea, s. 1ª, Milan, 1879; s. 2ª, Catania, 1882;
- C'era una volta..., Milan, 1882;
- Fumando, Catania 1889;
- Profumo, Palermo 1890;
- Le appassionate, Catania, 1893;
- Le paesane, Catania, 1894;
- Il raccontafiabe, Florence, 1894;
- Fausto Bragia, Catania, 1897;
- Nuove paesane, Turin, 1898;
- Scurpiddu, Turin, 1898;
- Il marchese di Roccaverdina, Milan, 1901;
- La scienza della letteratura, prolusione, Catania, 1902;
- Rassegnazione, Milan, 1907;
- Cardello, Palermo, 1907;
- Nel paese della zàgara, Florence, 1910;

== Bibliography ==
- Croce, Benedetto (1915). "Luigi Capuana". La letteratura della nuova Italia: Saggi critici. Vol. III. Bari: Laterza. pp. 101–18.
- Bosco, Umberto (1930). "CAPUANA, Luigi". Enciclopedia Italiana. Rome: Istituto dell'Enciclopedia Italiana.
- Norman, Hilda L. (1938). "The Scientific and the Pseudo-Scientific in the Works of Luigi Capuana". PMLA. 53 (3): 869–85. JSTOR 458660.
- Walker, E. A. (1965). "Structural Techniques in Luigi Capuana's Novels". Italica. 42 (3): 265–75. JSTOR 476902.
- Traversa, Vincenzo (1968). Luigi Capuana, Critic and Novelist. The Hague, Paris: Mouton.
- Pacifici, Sergio (1973). The Modern Italian Novel from Capuana to Tozzi. Carbondale: Southern Illinois University Press.
- Davies, Judith (1979). The Realism of Luigi Capuana: Theory and Practice in the Development of Late Nineteenth-century Italian Narrative. London: Modern Humanities Research Association. ISBN 9780900547584.
- House, Jane E. (2003). "Capuana, Luigi". The Oxford Encyclopedia of Theatre and Performance. Oxford: Oxford University Press.
- Sgroi, Alfredo (2007). "Luigi Capuana (1839–1915)". In Marrone, Gaetana (ed.). Encyclopedia of Italian Literary Studies. Vol. 1: A-J. Taylor & Francis. pp. 382–5.
- Miele, Gina M. (2009). "Luigi Capuana: Unlikely Spinner of Fairy Tales?". Marvels & Tales. 23 (2): 300–24. JSTOR 41388928.
- Canepa, Nancy (2015). "Capuana, Luigi". The Oxford Companion to Fairy Tales. Oxford: Oxford University Press.
