= Eva Barrett =

British photographer (1879–1950)

Eva Elbourn Barrett
- Born: 1879; Bishop's Stortford, Hertfordshire, England
- Died: 20 August 1950 (aged 70–71)
- Known for: Society photographer in Rome, Italy

Eva Elbourn Barrett (1879–1950) was a British woman who moved to Rome and, in the 1920s and 1930s, became well known as a photographer of the Italian royal family, Italian nobility, foreign ambassadors, and members of other European royal families and their children.

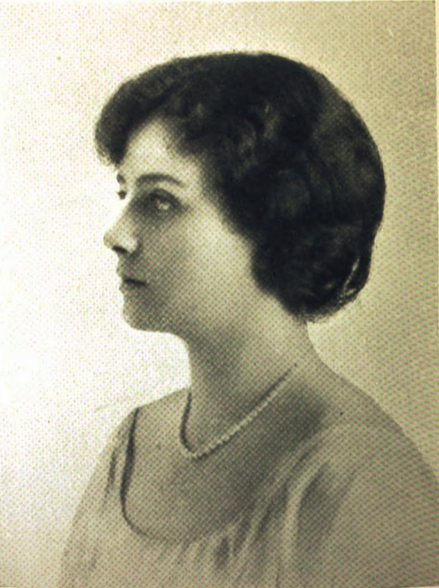
Giovanna Lanza di Trabia by Barrett

== Biography ==
Eva Elbourn Barrett was born in Bishop's Stortford in Hertfordshire, England in 1879. Early on in life she wanted to become a painter but was unhappy with the quality of her work and began to study photography. She then moved to Rome, Italy in 1913 where she continued to study photography, believing that it was “better to be a first-rate photographer than a second-rate [painter]".

With only a small half-plate camera, she created her own photographic method that resembled hand-drawn sketches, developing a personal version of the so-called "pastel portraiture". She achieved her effect by retouching the photograph with a few very light pencil strokes, managing to create subdued images but with particularly dense blacks, thus maintaining the characteristics of photography and portraiture. Her slogan was: "your friends can buy everything you can give them except your photograph".

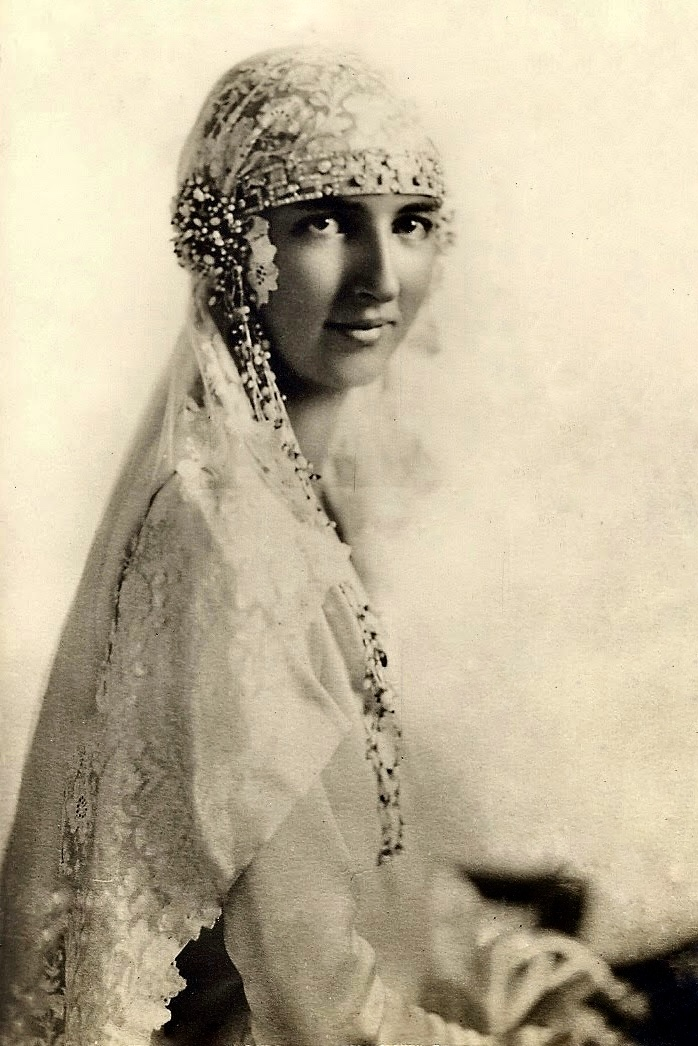
Princess Anne of Aosta

Introduced to Roman society by the wife of the Italian foreign minister, Antonino Paternò Castello, Marchese di San Giuliano, who had previously been the Italian ambassador in London, her unique style proved very popular with wives of foreign ambassadors and her services were much in demand to take their photographs and those of their children. She then photographed the Italian royal family and received numerous commissions from European royals in Belgium, Sweden, Greece. Some of her photographs were published in Tatler. Other people she photographed included the Italian dictator, Benito Mussolini and the Russian writer Leo Tolstoy. For a time, her studio became a meeting point for members of the nobility.

Her popularity only declined after the arrival in Rome from Florence around 1928 of Ghitta Carell, a Hungarian Jewish photographer who attracted many of Barrett's clients. Barrett and Carell competed for space in magazines published by Ottavia Vitagliano who took over her husband's publishing empire on his death. These publications included Eva, a magazine for society women, and L'Illustrazione Italiana, an illustrated weekly.

== Death and legacy ==
Little is known about the whereabouts of Barrett after the mid-1930s. She died on 20 August 1950 and her obituary featured on the front pages of newspapers worldwide. By the twenty-first century, however, her career had been largely forgotten, although her work continued to appear in exhibitions such as:

- The 46th Venice Biennale in 1995
- Ritratti di signora. Fotografi a Roma tra le due guerre (Portraits of a Lady. Photographers in Rome between the two wars), held in Rome in 2009
- L'immagine di sé. Il ritratto fotografico tra ’800 e ’900 (The image of oneself. The photographic portrait between the 19th and 20th centuries), held in Palermo, Italy in 2010

Since 2017 Catlin Langford, a photography curator, writer and researcher, has been trying to locate Barrett's photographs. Those identified included some in the Royal Collection and 500 glass plates found in archives in Turin, Italy.
