= Tumiati =

Tumiati is a surname. Notable people with the surname include:

- Gaetano Tumiati (1918–2012), Italian journalist, writer, and literary critic
- Gualtiero Tumiati (1876–1971), Italian actor and stage director
- Giovanni Tumiati (died 1804), Italian anatomist from Ferrara
