= Garzanti =

Italian publishing company founded in 1938

- Founded: 1938 in Milan
- Founder: Aldo Garzanti
- Country of origin: Italy
- Headquarters location: Milan
- Publication types: books; dictionaries; textbooks
- Official website: www.garzanti.it

Garzanti s.r.l. is an Italian publishing company founded in Milan, Italy, in 1938. It is known for publishing school textbooks, dictionaries (such as the Dizionari Garzanti), and encyclopedias (Le Garzantine).

== History ==
The company was founded by Aldo Garzanti in 1938 by acquiring the publishing house Treves, whose editorial activities, in particular the publication of the weekly magazine L'Illustrazione Italiana, were continued. In 1961, following the death of the father, Livio Garzanti took over the leadership of the company. The first publication of the Dizionari Garzanti, the first set of Italian dictionaries published by a group of editors instead of a single author, dates back to the same period.

In 1995 the company was acquired by UTET, later merged in 2002 with the Gruppo De Agostini. Since 2006, the company is part of the Gruppo editoriale Mauri Spagnol (GeMS).
