= Arnaldo Ferraguti =

Italian painter (1862–1925)

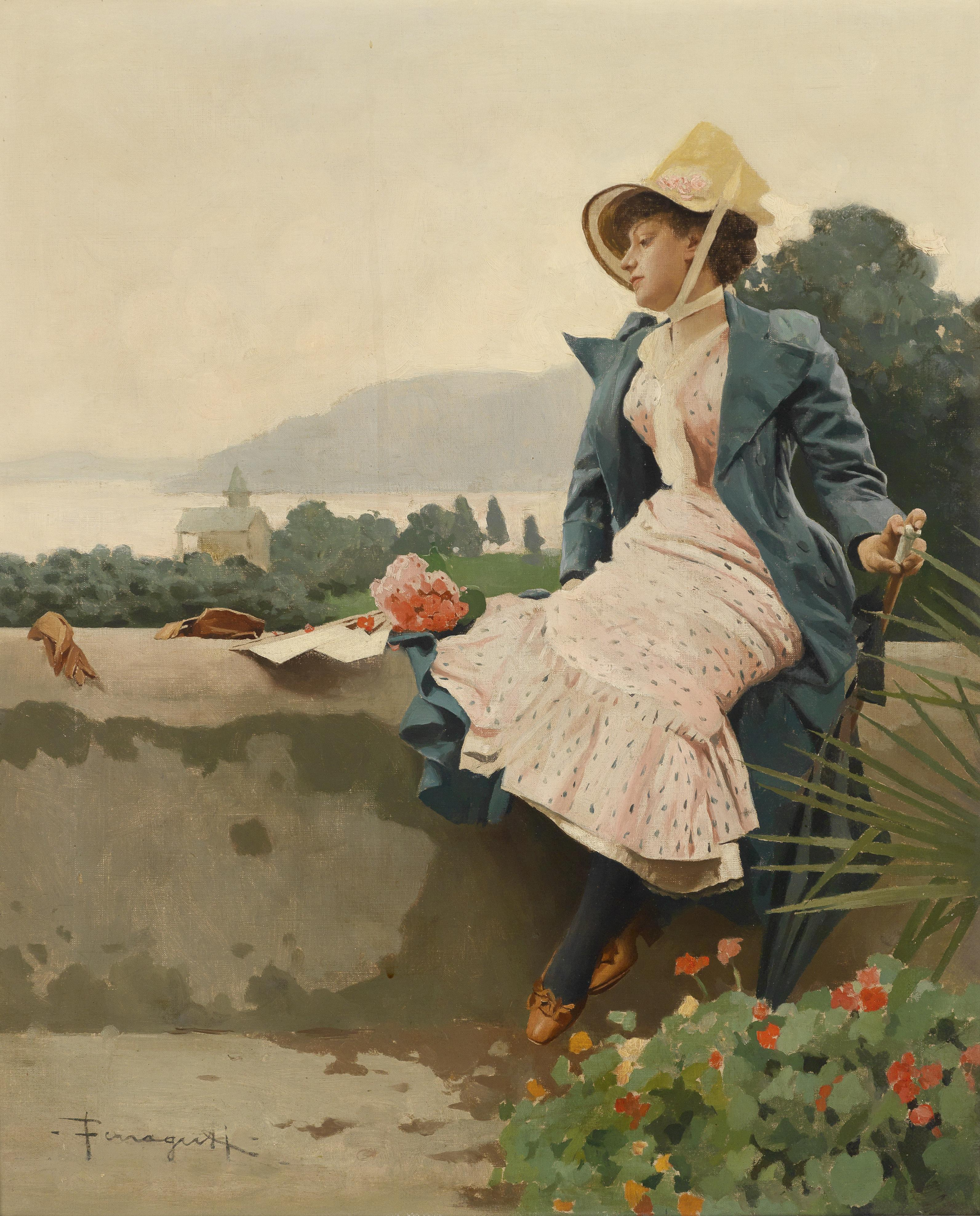
- The Expectation
- Born: April 17, 1862; Ferrara, Kingdom of Italy
- Died: December 4, 1925 (aged 63); Forlì, Kingdom of Italy
- Education: Naples Academy of Fine Arts
- Occupation: Painter

Arnaldo Ferraguti (17 April 1862 – 4 December 1925) was an Italian painter and illustrator, often painting genre subjects.

== History ==
He was born in Ferrara but trained at the Accademia di Belle Arti of Naples, then under the leadership of Domenico Morelli. He befriended the painter Francesco Paolo Michetti and his circle at Francavilla al Mare.

In 1891, he married Olga Treves, granddaughter of the publishers Emilio and Giuseppe Treves and was employed to illustrate their magazine L'Illustrazione Italiana. He erected a villa in Pallanza where he taught painting, and attended salons in the nearby Villa Cordelia of Giuseppe Treves. He died in Forlì in 1925.

== Works ==
In 1887, he exhibited a series of pastel studies in Venice.

Starting in 1890, he submitted his masterwork: a massive (nearly 6 by 3 meter) canvas Alla vanga to various exhibitions, to praise and awards. The canvas depicts a line of peasants, from children to elders, including some barefoot women and children, breaking the soil with spades while nearby the supervisor talks to peasant working women. The scene trumpets a clear affection for the hard-laboring proletarian farmers. It can be contrasted to the less romanticized The Fourth Estate painting (1901) by Giuseppe Pellizza da Volpedo, which portrays workers with no pastoral embellishment.

Other works by Ferraguti include paintings and illustrations for books Illustrations for Cuore by Edmondo De Amicis; Illustrations for Vita dei Campi by Giovanni Verga; in addition to canvases depicting Madre; Vespero; Bivio; and Prima e poi.

== Gallery ==
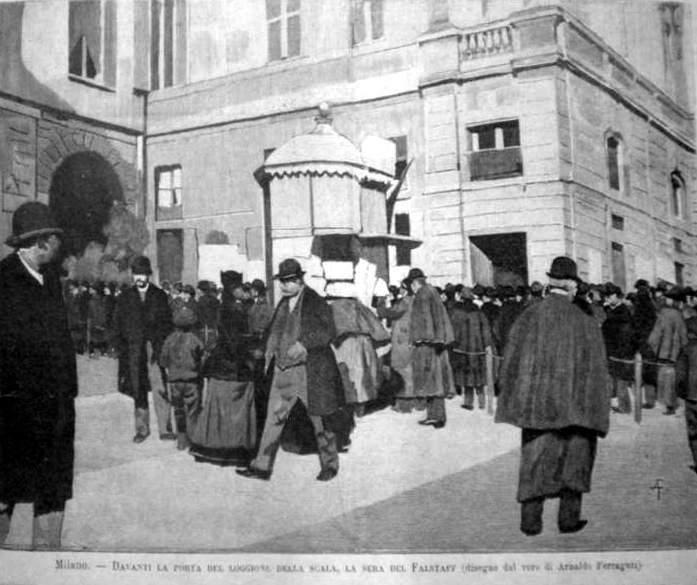

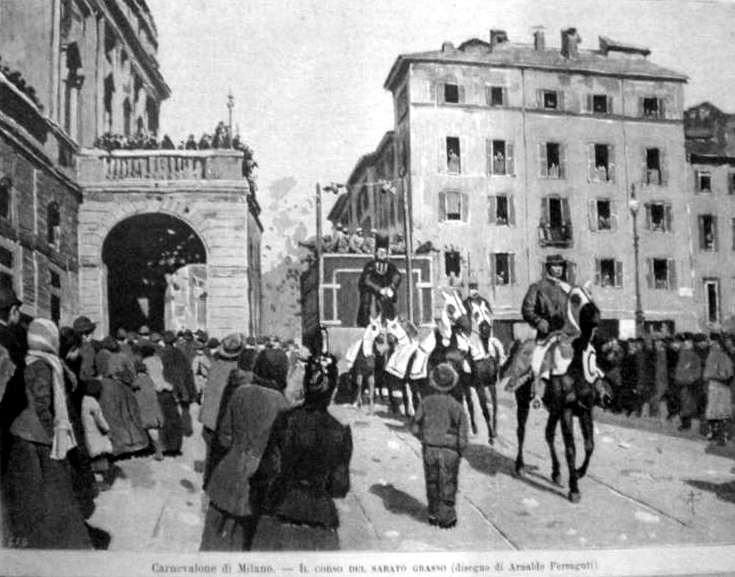

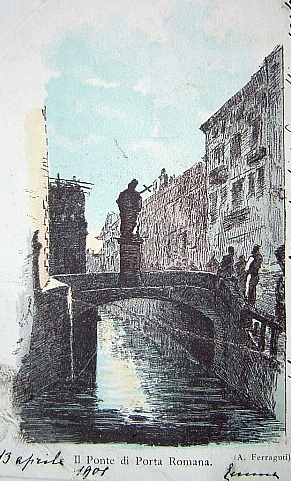

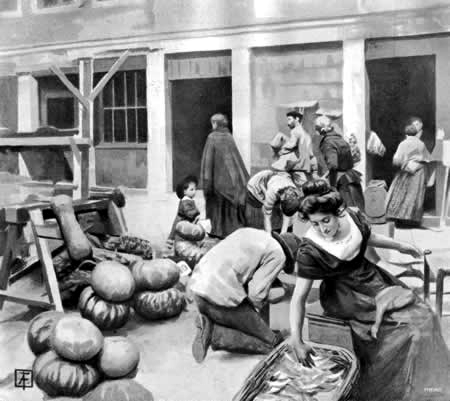
