= Imre von Santho =

Hungarian photographer

Imre Szántó, worked professionally as Imre von Santho, (1895, Budapest – 1957 due to suicide, Frankfurt/Main) was a Hungarian fashion photographer and illustrator, based in Berlin and Vienna between the wars.

== Career ==
In the 1920s, he worked as a fashion illustrator and he produced erotic illustrations, which he signed I. de Chanteau. In the 1926 Handbuch des Kunstmalers (Directory of Berlin artists) he is shown at W15 Fasanenstrasse 33.

He worked for the Agentur Schostal in Berlin from 1929 onwards. In the years between the wars, the Agentur Schostal had its head office in Vienna, with branches in Paris, Milan, Berlin and Stockholm. It was particularly successful in the 1930s up until the declaration of the Second World War. The main customers were print media, including magazines such as Die Dame, Die Woche and Uhu in Germany and Moderne Welt, Die Bühne, Wiener Salonblatt and Wiener Magazin in Austria, to which Schostal supplied images relating to culture, fashion and glamor. Its images also appeared in U.S. publications.

His studio was at 10 Tiergartenstrasse in Berlin (a Gabrielle von Santho is shown in the Jüdisches Adressbuch für Gross-Berlin (Jewish Address Book) for 1931 at that address) and from 1932 to 1933 he worked from his studio at 44 Kaiserdamm.

He frequently worked with the German "supermodel" of the day, Karen Stilke.

After Hitler came to power, he supposedly left Germany and moved to Vienna. However, it has been noted that he was a friend of Magda Goebbels and some of his Berlin fashion photography carries dates in the late 1930s and 1940s. In 1933 the Deutsches Modeamt (German Fashion Office) was established by the Ministry of Propaganda, under the leadership of Madga Goebbels, from which her husband dismissed her very early on.

Imre von Santho is shown in the Berlin telephone directories for 1940 and 1941 having a studio at W15 Kurfurstendamm 201 (and at 102). Whilst all luxury magazines had suspended publication in 1939, von Santho remained as the main fashion photographer for the journal Der Silberspiegel (The Silver Mirror) until March 1943 when it too suspended publication.

After 1945 his name was mentioned as a teacher at the photo academy of Angelo (Pál Funk). After the war he married Katharina (Carina) Haarhaus (1922-2014), a society lady who married later the mountaineer, sportsman, geographer and author Heinrich Harrer. Imre von Santho died in 1957 in Frankfurt/Main.

== Exhibitions ==
His work was shown in 2013 at the exhibition, Vanity Fashion Photography from the F.C. Gundlach Collection at the National Museum in Kraków, Poland. Previously, in 2005, the show Berliner Modefotografie - Die Dreißiger Jahre, at the Kunstbibliothek, Berlin, had included his works.

== Photos ==
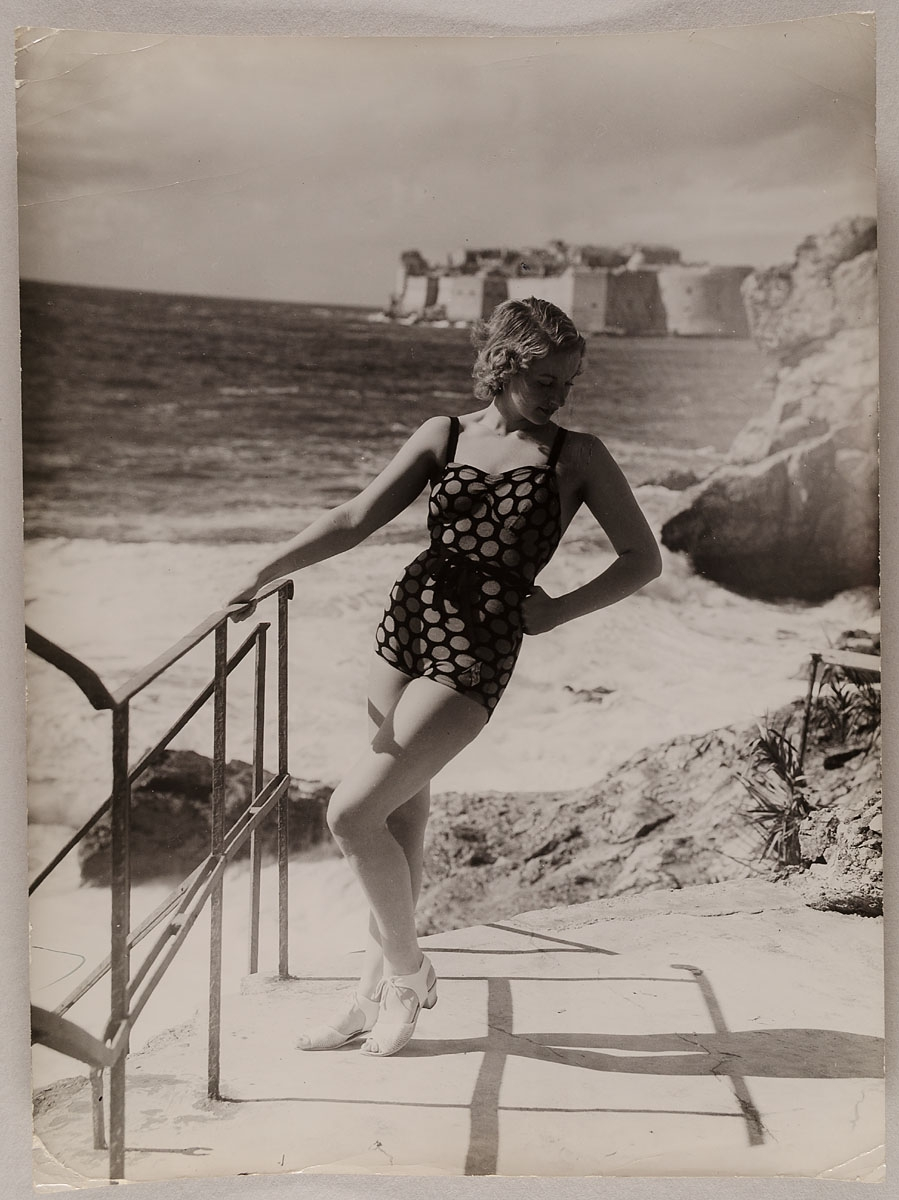

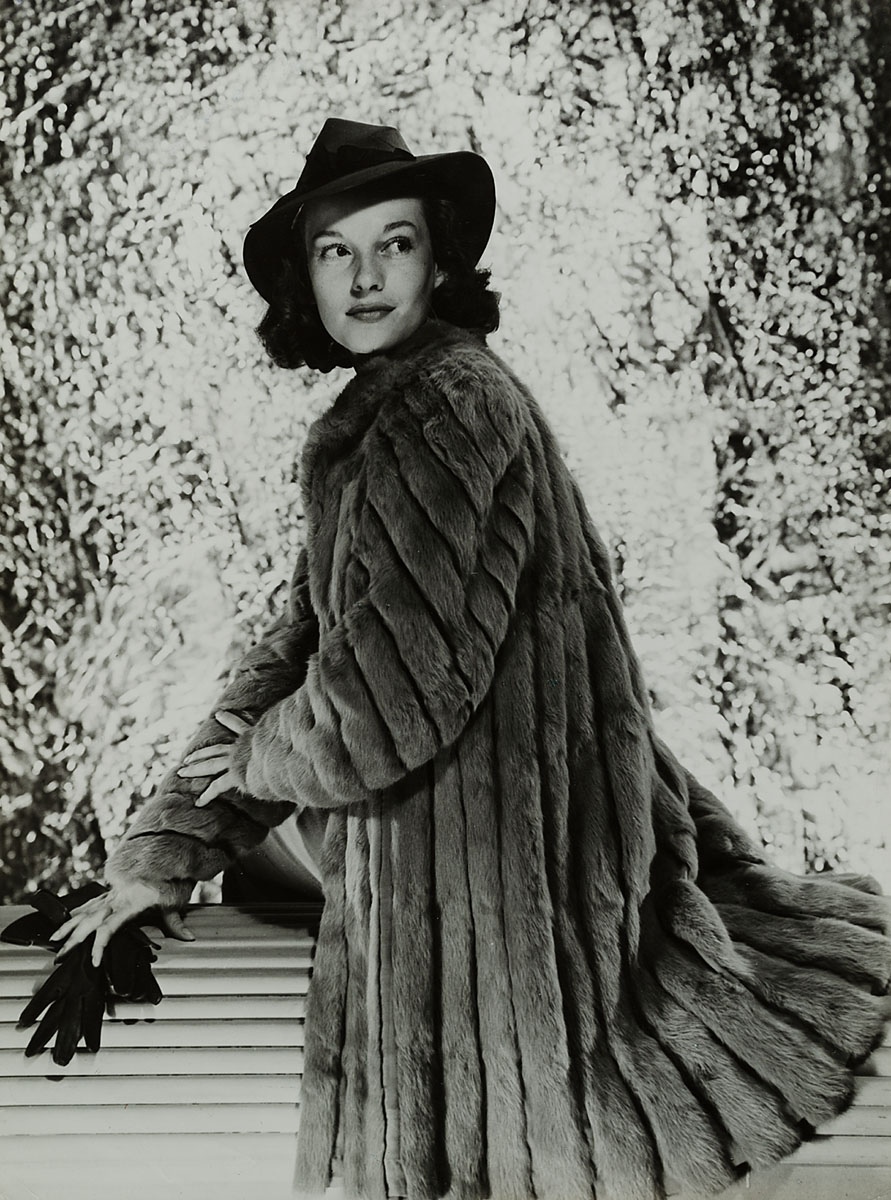

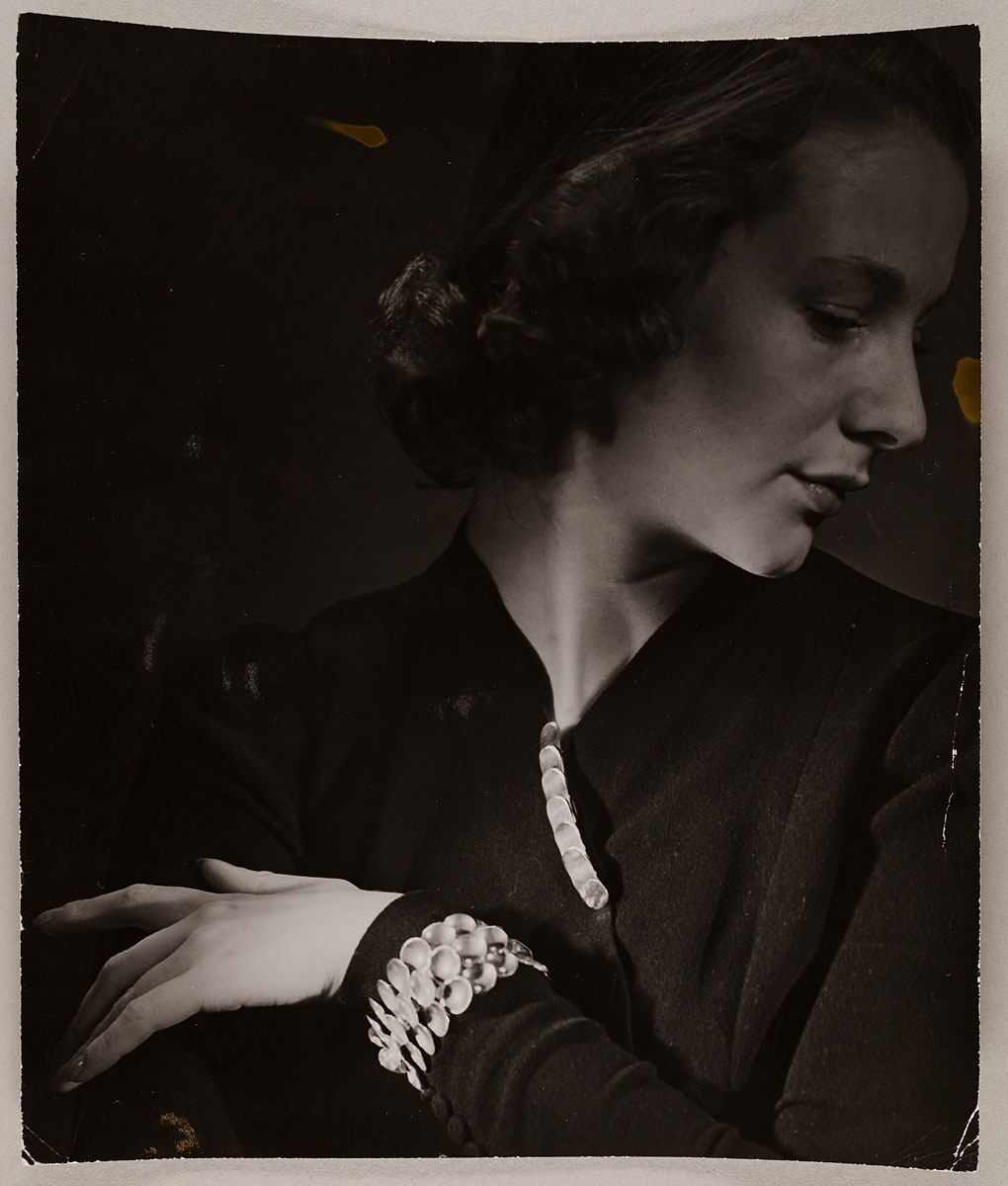
