= Emidio Agostinoni =

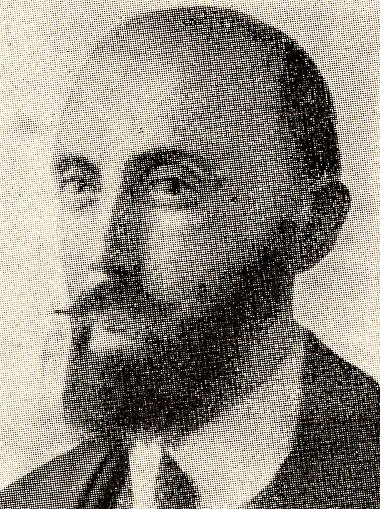

Emidio Agostinoni (or Agostinone) (Montesilvano, May 13, 1879 – Montesilvano, September 28, 1933) was an Italian politician, journalist, photographer and pedagogue.

== Biography ==
He initially practiced as an elementary school teacher; he moved to Milan where he dedicated himself to journalism. He founded the periodical La cultura popolare (The Popular Culture), published in Milan from 1911, under the supervision of the Italian Union of Popular Culture. He contributed to the daily Avanti! and to several periodicals including L'Illustrazione Italiana (The Italian Illustration), La Lettura (The Reading), Il Secolo XX (The 20th Century), Nuova antologia (New Anthology), Critica sociale (Social Critique), both as a writer and a photographer.

At the center of his interests were the issues of schooling and education, the fight against illiteracy and, more generally, the emancipation of the working classes, with investigations, articles, and photographic reports on the condition of farmers and shepherds; notable is the volume on school legislation drafted in 1906 with Enrico Giuriati; Agostinoni also produced publications related to the territory, landscape, and monuments of Abruzzo, published by the Istituto d'Arti grafiche (Institute of Graphic Arts) of Bergamo, for which the journalist also took care of the iconographic apparatus.

In 1919 and 1921 he was elected as a socialist deputy for the constituencies of Teramo and L'Aquila. He aligned himself with the reformists. With the advent of fascism, he ceased all public and journalistic activity and retired to private life in his home in Montesilvano.

He died in September 1933.

Montesilvano has named the municipal library and the scientific high school after him.

== Works ==
- From the land of Abruzzo. Eight letters to the “Lombardia” newspaper in Milan, Milan, R.Sandron, 1905; and also 2nd ed, Montesilvano, Associazione culturale Amici del Libro Abruzzese, 2000;
- (Written with Enrico Giuriati), History of the sub-elementary, elementary and normal school legislation, with a foreword by V.E. Orlando, Treviso, Zoppelli, 1907;
- The Agony of Messina. A hundred illustrations from photographs by Emidio Agostinoni, Giacomo Brogi, and Mario Corsi ... , Rome, L'Italia industriale artistica, 1908;
- Il Fucino, Bergamo, Istituto italiano d'arti grafiche, 1908, with photographs by Emidio Agostinoni;
- Highlands of Abruzzo, Bergamo: Istituto italiano d'arti grafiche, 1912, with photographs by Emidio Agostinoni;
- Maiolica and Maiolica Artists of Abruzzo, Milan, 1906, pp. 854/864 with illustrations. The Cappelletti Factory in Rapino.

For Agostinoni's interventions as a deputy, refer to “Atti del Parlamento italiano” for the XXV and XXVI legislatures.

== Bibliography ==
- Alberto Caracciolo (1960). Dizionario Biografico degli Italiani, Volume 1: Aaron–Albertucci (in Italian). Rome: Istituto dell'Enciclopedia Italiana. ISBN 978-88-12-00032-6
- Raffaele Aurini, Agostinoni Emidio, in Bibliographic Dictionary of the people of Abruzzo, vol. IV, Teramo, Ars et Labor, 1962, and in the New edition, Colledara, Teramo, Andromeda Publishing, 2002, vol. I, pp. 79–86;
- Bibliography of the Italian workers and socialist periodical press (1860-1926) directed by Franco della Peruta. The Milan periodicals. Bibliography and history. Volume II (1905-1926), Milan, Feltrinelli, 1961, p. 131;
- Emidio Agostinoni, in Photographers from Abruzzo of the Nineteenth and early Twentieth centuries, edited by Corrado Anelli and Fausto Eugeni, Sant'Atto di Teramo, Edigrafital, 2002, p. XXXVI, (Vintage Shots, 6);
- Michelangelo Paglialonga, Agostinone Emidio, in People of Abruzzo. Biographical dictionary, edited by Enrico Di Carlo, vol. I, pp. 71–74, Castelli, Teramo, Andromeda Publishing, 2006, 10 volumes, the Analytical Index of the work is available on Delfico.it;
