= Dario Querci =

Italian painter (1831–1918)

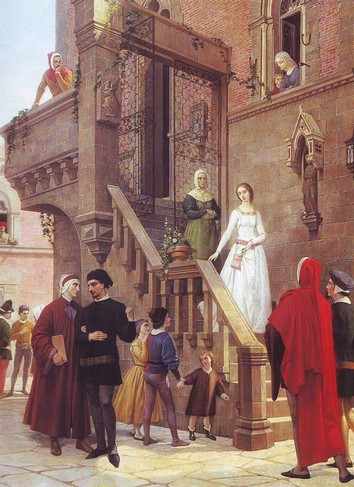
L'incontro di Dante con Beatrice, 1866, Galleria d'Arte Moderna, Palermo

Dario Querci (November 11, 1831- Rome, 1918) was an Italian painter, mainly painting historical and literary subjects in a late-Neoclassic style.

== Biography ==
He was born in Messina, where he first trained with the painter Antonino Bonanno, but soon moved on to study under Nicola Miller, and later in 1851, entered the studio of Michele Panebianco.

During the revolutions of 1848, he was drawn to the fighting, designing artillery. He painted canvases, including Matteo Palizzi circondato dai congiurati, depicting a 14th-century Sicilian who opposed foreign rule of the island. In 1854, funded by a 255 Lira stipend given by the City of Messina, he traveled with Panebianco to study in Rome. There he befriended the visiting Nazarene painter Peter von Cornelius, who said of the young Querci: He begins where we end.

Among his works are Frederick III of Sicily dispenses bread to the poor during the Siege of Messina by Charles of Anjou; L' Angiolo delle tombe, donated to the engineer Leone Savoya; Luna and Perollo (about a medieval family feud in Sicily, exhibited in 1861 at Florence); Repose in Egypt painted for the Cathedral of Ragusa; Fausto e Margherita bought by the banker Theodore Rabb, and for which two other copies were made; and The Saracen di Messina also bought by Rabb. Fausto e Margherita was exhibited at the 1864 Exhibition of Palermo. Other works include Dante and Beatrice; Cola da Rienzi and the Roman Barons; Cola da Rienzi speaks to the populace in San Giorgio in Velabro (awarded a medal at Vienna in 1873); Lo Stemma degli Orsini e La dimane d'una battaglia commissioned by Prince Orsini; an episode during Baron de Hubner's Trip to Japan; Baron Hubner, Austrian ambassador travels a train in Gala to submit his credentials to Pope Pius IX in 1860, was commissioned by the Baron; Portrait of King and Queencommissioned by the City of Messina after the death of King Vittorio Emanuele II; Mazzini in Campidoglio; and Entry of Garibaldi to Palermo. This latter work was reproduced for Art journals in Italy and l'Illustrazione Italiana of the House of Treves. He also painted two canvases for a chapel in Mexico; a genre painting of life in Chile; and a Romeo and Juliet for London. Querci also painted the Neo-pompeian scene of genre: Un gioco di Dadi.

His Il Cola di Rienzo che parla al popolo (Cola da Rienzi speaks to the populace in San Giorgio in Velabro, Dante and Beatrice, and Entry of Garibaldi to Palermo are among his masterworks.

He also painted many portraits, including many at Istanbul and Vienna. Among his portraits are those of Prince Orsini, of the Baroness Camerata Scorazzo, Enrica Parisi, Duke Grazioli di Rome, Baron Natoli, Filippo Cordova, Senators Tommasi and Basiie, Baron Donnafugata, of the Baroness Cordova, and Count Baumansaint. In 1891, for the Cassazione of Palermo, he painted a full-size portrait of King Umberto I and Queen Margherita.

Described by Gubernatis as serious and modest, Querci in 1873 was knighted in the Order of Santi Maurizio e Lazzaro; in 1877, into the Order of the Crown of Italy. He served on may artistic juries and was elected professor at the Royal Institute of Fine Arts in Rome. One of his pupils was Giulio Rosati.
