= Aldo Garzanti =

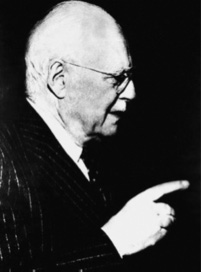
Aldo Garzanti

Aldo Garzanti (1883 in Forlì – 1961 in San Pellegrino Terme) was an Italian entrepreneur and publisher, who founded the eponymous publishing company.

== Early life ==
Born in Forlì, his father was a schoolteacher and follower of Garibaldi. He was educated in his native city where G. Mazzatinti introduced him to librarianship. He then studied at the Faculty of Letters in the University of Bologna, graduating in 1907.

Immediately after graduating, he joined a group of intellectuals associated with the journal La Romagna nella storia, nella letteratura e nelle arti, becoming its editor in 1911. He took a special interest in the social and economic history of the region, publishing accounts of developments from the 16th to the 18th centuries. At the same time, he took up teaching, first at the high school in Rimini, then at Alatri (1909) and Chieri (1912). During the First World War, he enlisted in the artillery until April 1919 when he was discharged with the rank of captain.

== Business career ==
Immediately after the war he moved to Milan where he gave up teaching in favour of a business career, becoming the Italian agent for American chemicals producers including DuPont and founding his own company, Dott. Aldo Garzanti Coloranti et Prodotti Chimici, a distribution outlet supplying the textile and leather industries. As a result of his success, in 1921 he was able to open his own manufacturing company, SADAF, which produced dyes and chemicals for soaking and tanning hides and leathers. In 1932, he widened his interests, opening MIRET specializing in lace and silk. The following year he created a model agricultural enterprise in Suvignano, Tuscany but above all, in 1936, he acquired the Treves publishing company which was in difficulty. Created in 1861 by Emilio Treves, Fratelli Treves Editori had been a leading publisher not only in Lombardy but throughout Italy. After changing its name to Casa Editrice Garzanti, he received support from Benito Mussolini which brought him lucrative commissions from the library authorities, making it one of the top publishing companies in Italy.

The company suffered during the Second World War when the old Treves printing plant was bombed but Garzanti was successful in rebuilding modern facilities within a year, winning the Roncoroni prize for rapid redevelopment. In 1952, suffering from poor health, he retired as managing director of the company but remained chairman of the board.

== Later life ==
In later life, Garzanti devoted his efforts mainly to philanthropic activities, contributing to the restoration of the castle Rocca Caterina Sforza in Forlì and assisting artists through the Fondazione Livio e Maria Garzanti. In 1954, he financed the Italian expedition which successfully climbed K2. He died in 1961 at the age of 78.

== Family ==
In 1920, Garzanti married Maria Ravasi who gave birth to their son Livio in 1921. Livio later took over the family publishing business.
