= Giulio Rosati =

Italian painter (1857–1917)

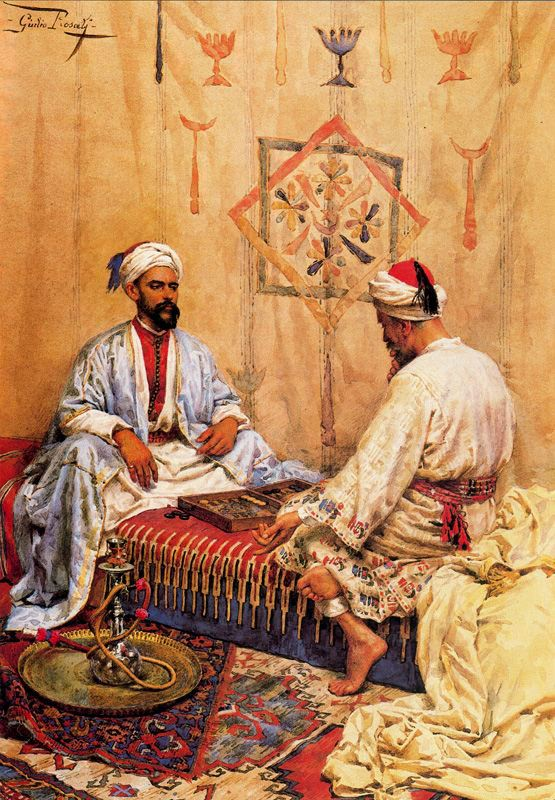
- The Trictrac Players, painting y Giulio Rosati
- Born: 1861; Rome, Papal States
- Died: 1917 (aged 55–56); Rome, Italy
- Education: Accademia di San Luca
- Movement: Orientalist themes

Giulio Rosati (1857–1917) was an Italian painter who specialized in Orientalist and academic scenes.

== Biography ==
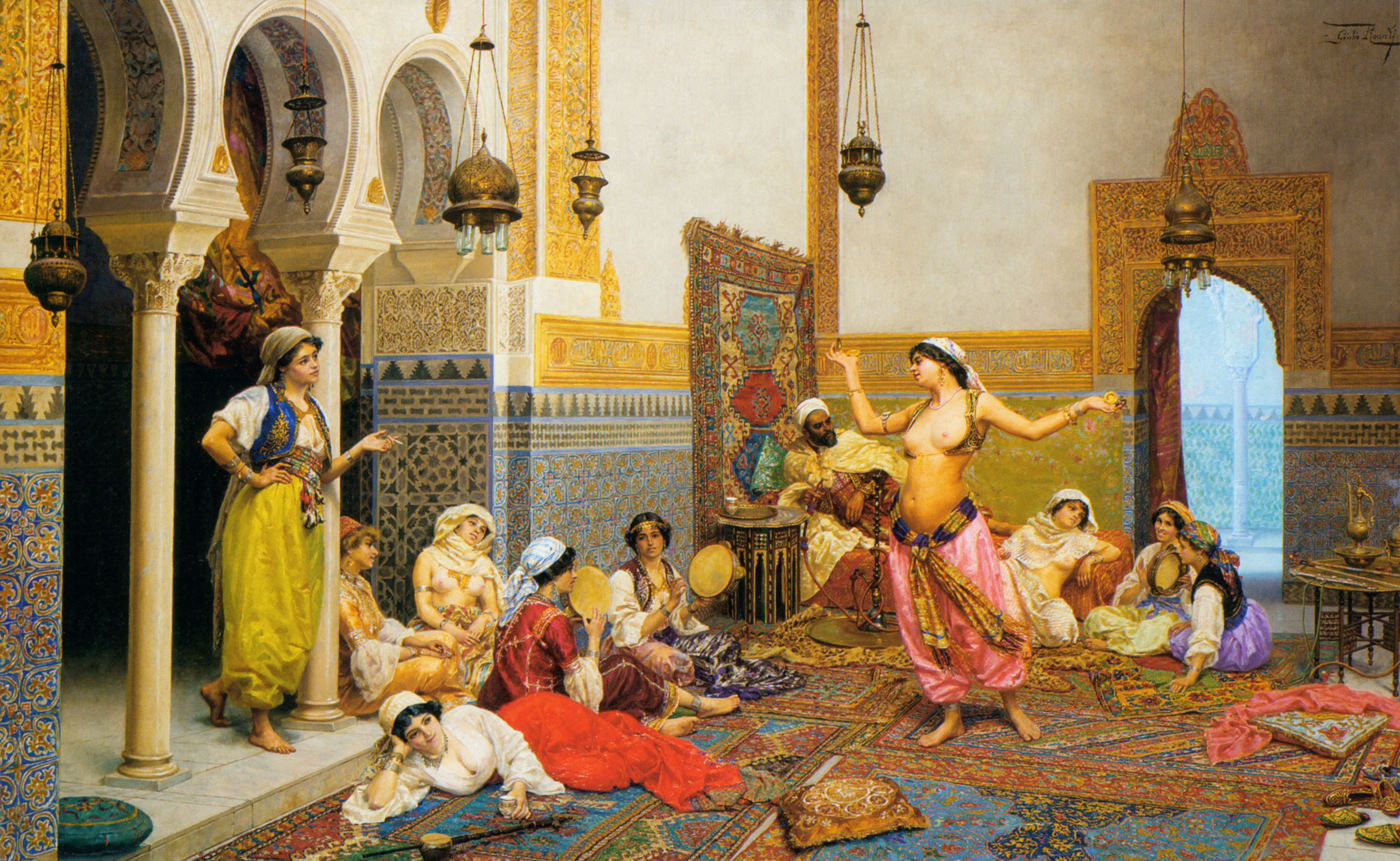
The Harem Dance

Giulio Rosati was born in Rome in 1861 into a family of bankers and militarists. He did not follow his family's career and instead studied art at the Accademia di San Luca under Dario Querci and Francesco Podesti. He also studied with Luis Álvarez y Catalá (1836-1901), director of the Prado Museum, Madrid. He worked mainly in watercolour, and occasionally in oil, and focussed most of his entire painting career on Orientalist art. He devoted himself particularly to representations of the Maghreb, that he never visited himself. His painting, Oriental Scene was exhibited at the Exposition di Belle Arte, in Rome in 1900.

He was part of a large group of painters, who at the time were depicting similar Middle Eastern subject matter. He became one of the most prolific Orientalist painters of the 19th century. Unlike other Orientalists, he never journeyed to the Middle East. He rarely participated in exhibitions, preferring to sell his works directly through art dealers.

His son, Alberto Rosati (1893–1971), was also an Orientalist painter. However, his son was far less productive than his father.

== Notable paintings ==
- Picking the Favourite (1880)
- Arab Horsemen Conversing with Carpet Merchant
- Bedouins Preparing a Combat Patrol (1895)
- The Inspection of the New Arrivals
- A Discussion in the Desert
- A Horseman stopping at a Bedouin Camp
- Circassian Beauties Being Inspected
- Gossiping
- Arms Dealers
- The Backgammon Players
- The Chess Players
- The Carpet Merchant
- The Tric Trac Players
- Dancing in the Harem
- The Musicians
- The Wedding
- The Slave Market

== Gallery ==
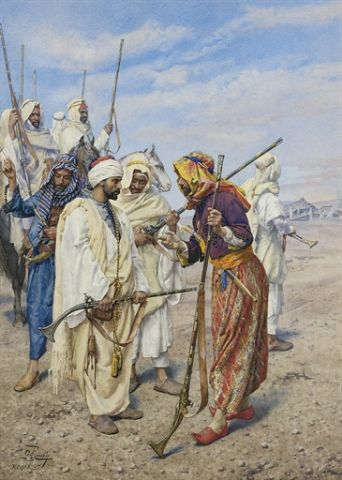
Bedouins Preparing a Combat Patrol (1895)

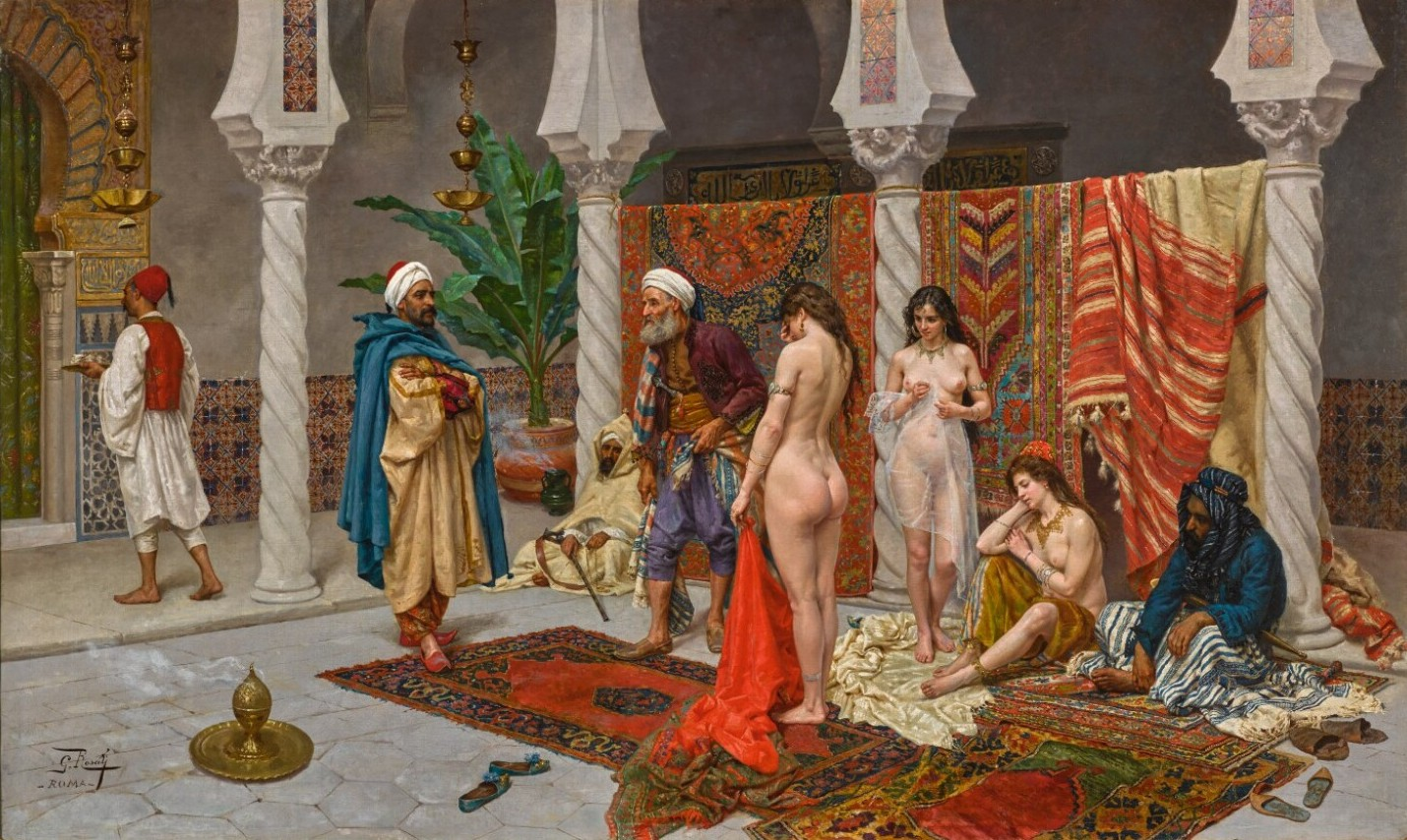
Inspecting New Arrivals

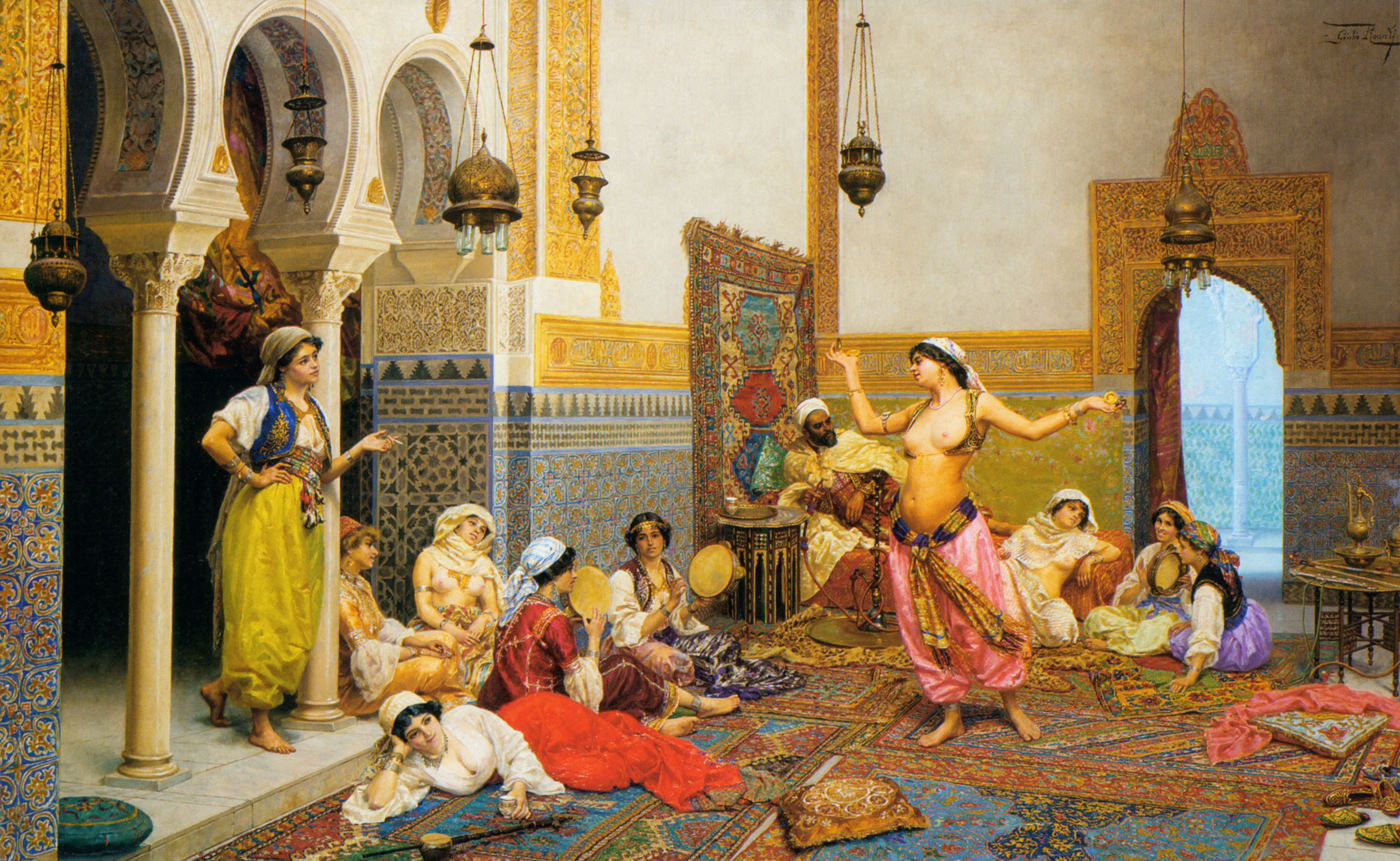
Dancing in the Harem

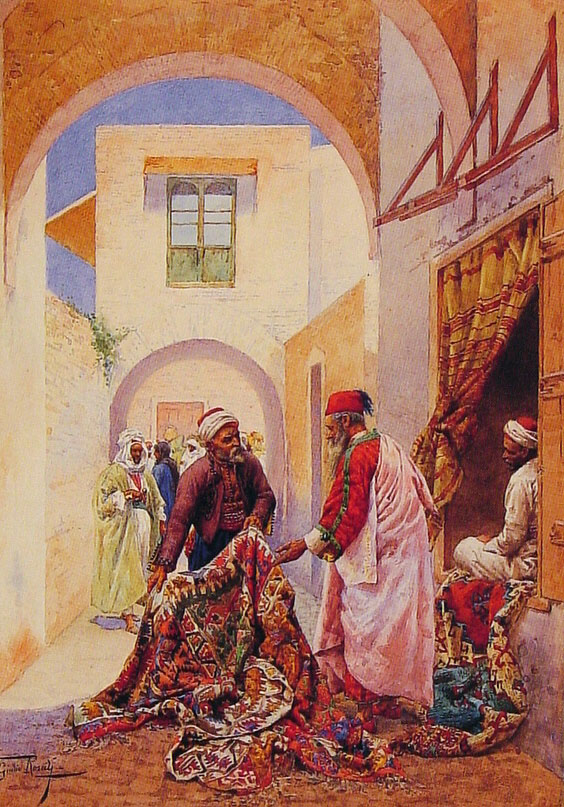
The Carpent Merchant tunis

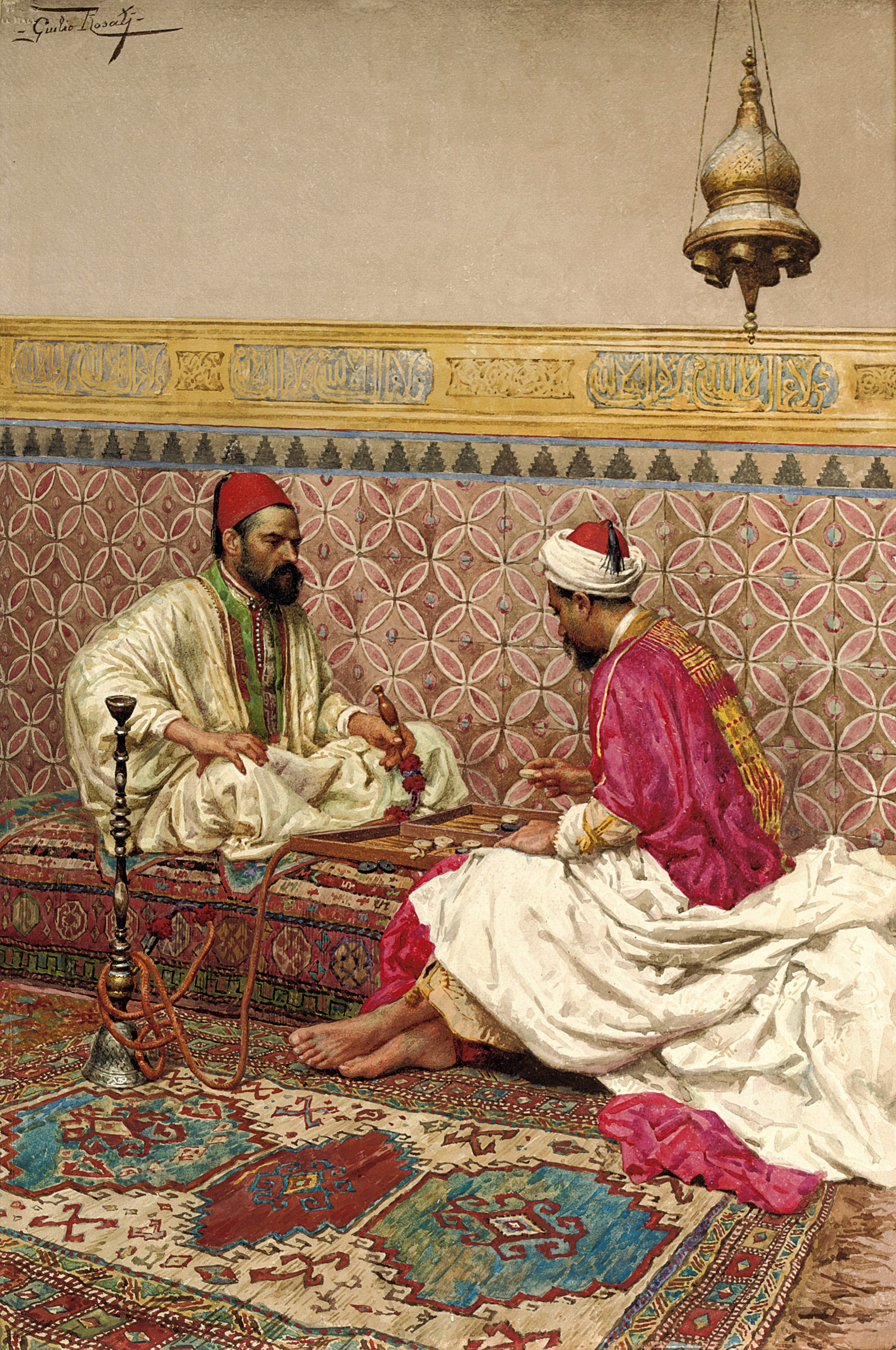
The Backgammon Players

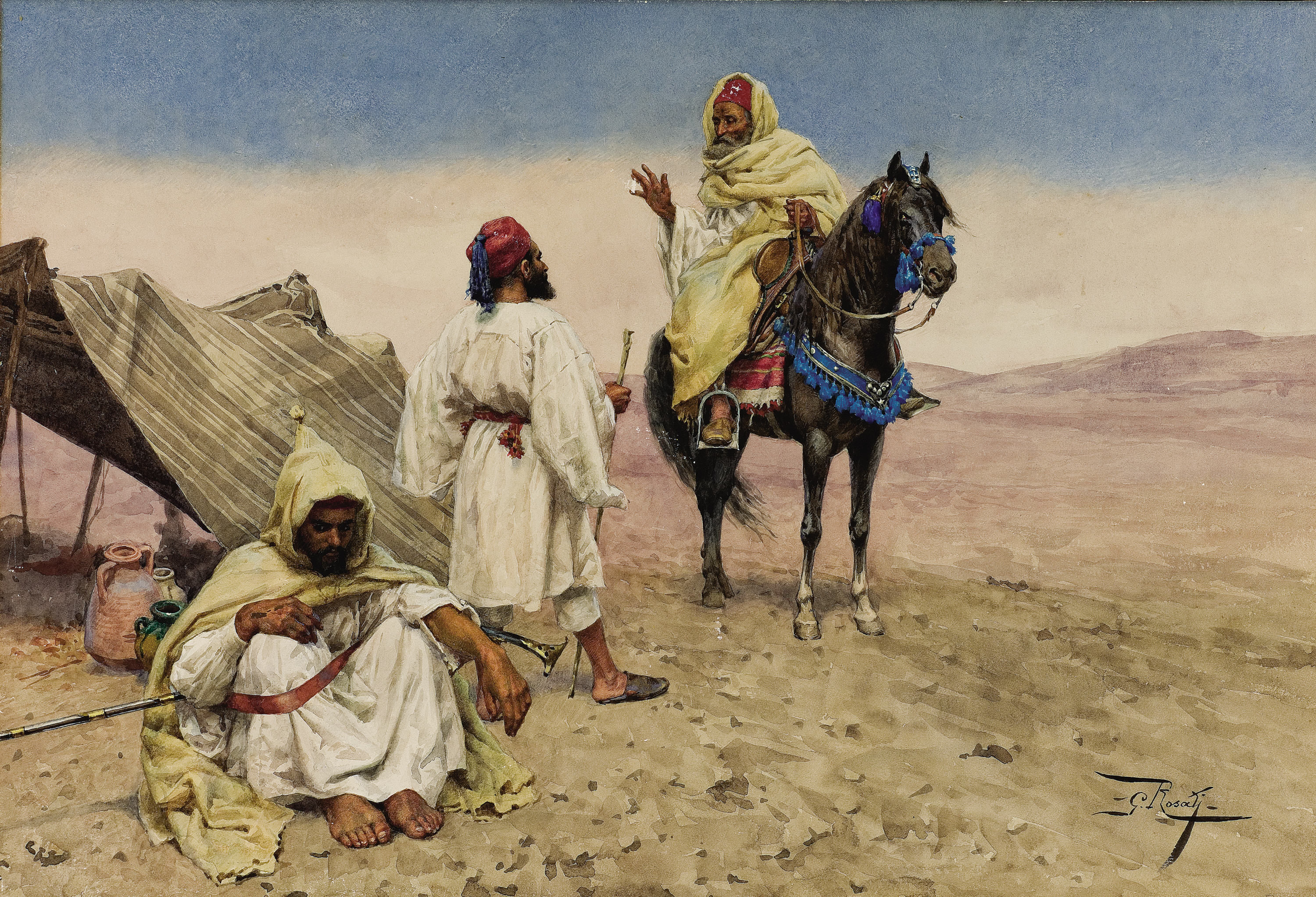
Nomads Kairouan

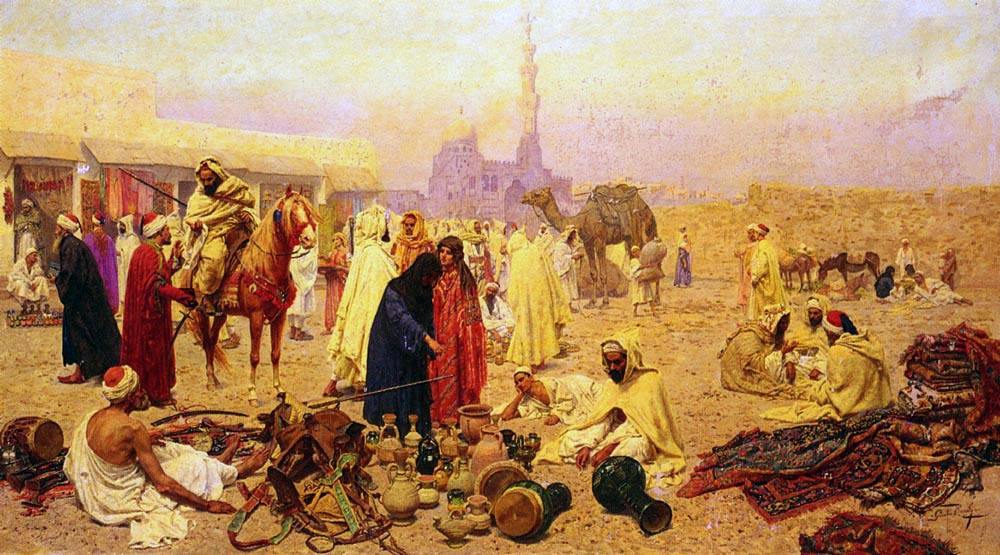
An Arab Market Caire

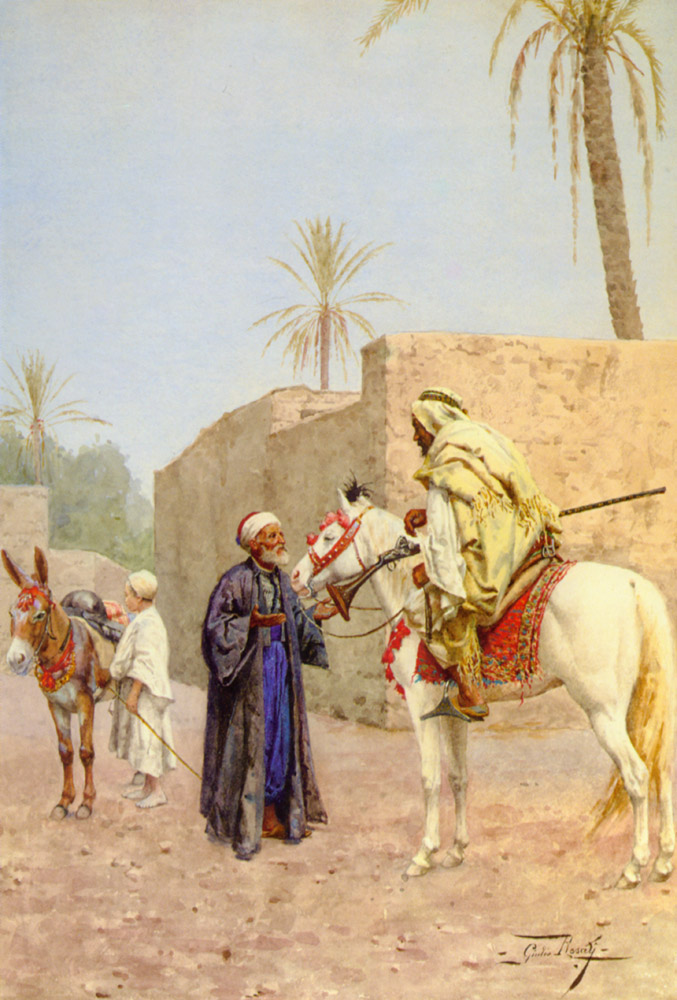
A Discussion

== See also ==
- List of Orientalist artists
- Orientalism
