= L'Illustrazione Italiana =

Italian pictorial magazine founded 1873

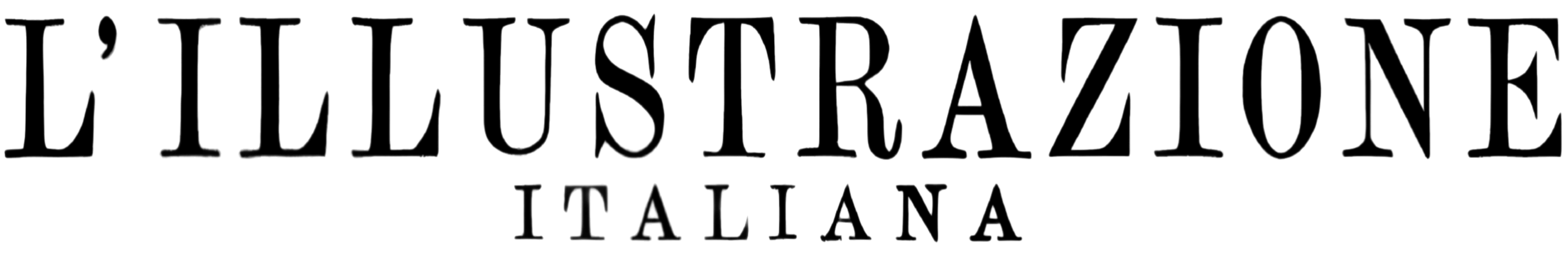

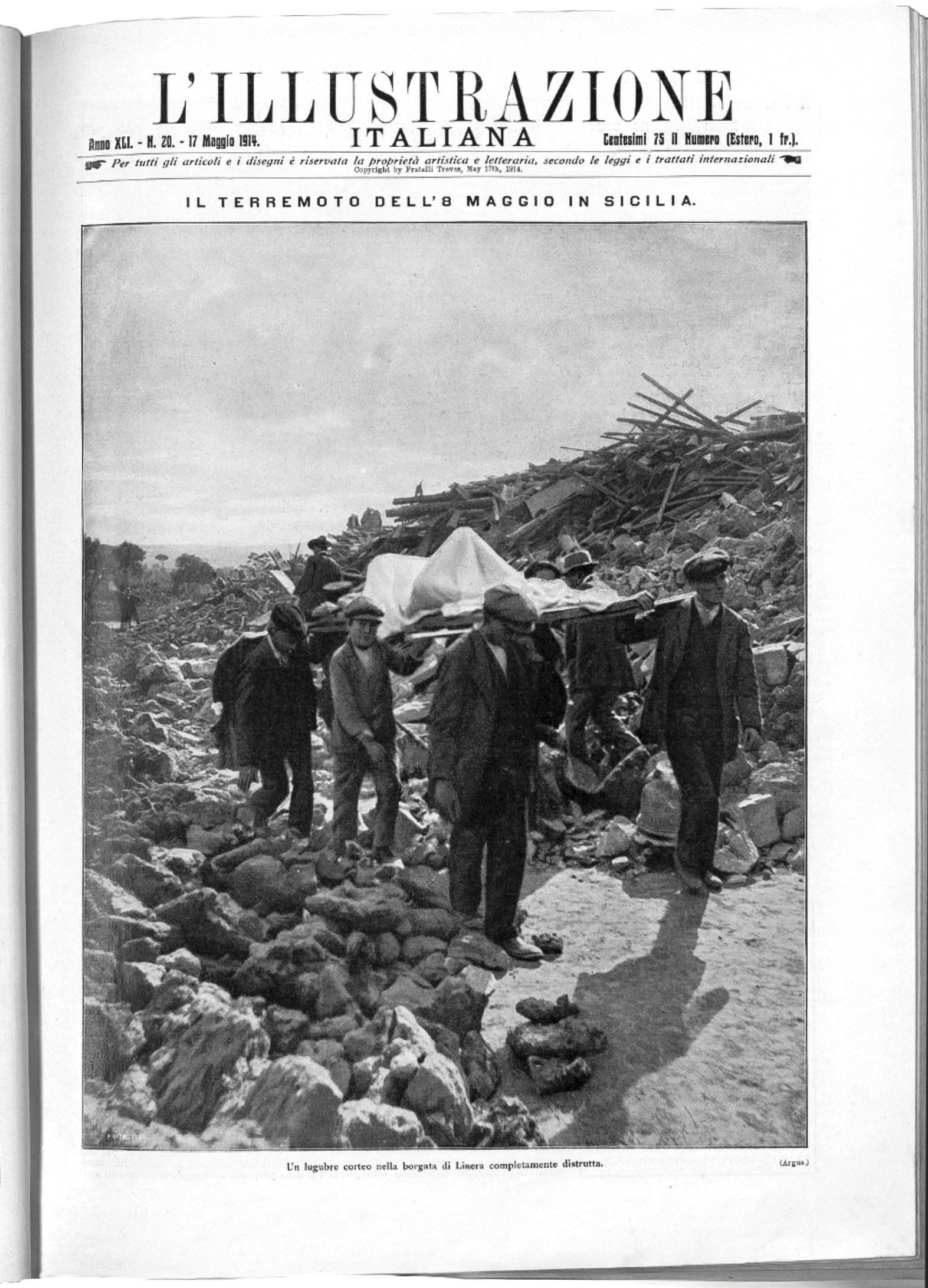
- Cover of L'Illustrazione Italiana, Vol. XLI, n. 20, 17 May 1914, reporting 'The Earthquake of 8 May in Sicily'
- Editor: Emilio Treves
- Editor: Guido Treves
- Editor: Aldo Garzanti
- Editor: Gaetano Tumiati
- Frequency: Weekly, monthly from 1951, irregular 1972–73, bimonthly 1981–1996, 2011> irregular
- Format: 38 cm, 20–40 pages
- Publisher: Fratelli Treves, Garzanti after 1939
- Paid circulation: 15,000
- Founder: Emilio and Guido Treves
- Founded: 1 December 1873
- First issue: November 1, 1875; 150 years ago
- Final issue: December 31, 1962; 63 years ago
- Country: Italy
- Based in: Milan
- Language: Italian

L'Illustrazione Italiana was an illustrated Italian weekly.

Based in Milan, the magazine was distributed across Italy and abroad, and published continuously from 1873 to 1962 for a total of almost 5,000 issues. Together with La Domenica del Corriere and La Tribuna illustrata, it was one of the most-read illustrated weeklies in Italy from the late nineteenth century to the advent of television. In 1981, publication was resumed under various publishers.

== History ==
The journal was founded in Milan on 1 December 1873, by the Trieste publisher Fratelli Treves, of whom Emilio was also its first editor, under the masthead Nuova Illustrazione Universale. The Treves brothers Emilio and Guido acquired in 1874 a competing magazine which appeared in Roma at the same time and of a similar type and design; L' Illustrazione - Rivista Italiana, edited by the Roman artist Alessandro Foli, and for the merger starting 1 November 1875, the weekly adopted the more incisive title.

The magazine aimed at an upper-class audience for whom it was a 'status symbol', and its cost of 3 lira against 30 cents for La Domenica del Corriere and 10 for another Fratelli Treves publication, L'Illustrazione Popolare, signalled prestige to would-be purchasers. Bernadini's guide of 1890 records the price of a yearly subscription in Italy to Illustrated London News at 47 lire, comparable to the cost for The Graphic, Illustrirte Zeitung, thus being, as Finaldi notes, twice that of a subscription to L'Illustrazione Italiana despite its much smaller weekly 15,000 print run.

In the Publishers' circular and booksellers' record of 1885 L'Illustrazione Italiana was advertised as a 'great publication' ranked with:

...the Illustrated London News and The Graphic...in England, L'Illustration in France, and the Illustrirte Zeilung in Germany. Nine pages are devoted to Illustrations of Current Events and the Fine Arts, designed by the most celebrated artists of modern Italy, and among others by Dalbono, Michetti, Favretto, Bisto, and Paolocci. The Literary contents are also of the highest class; Editorials, Reviews, Notes on Current Events, Poetry and Fiction, being contributed by De Amicis, [Giovanni] Verga, D'Ancona, Stecchetti, Momenti, Castelnuovo, Barrili, and other distinguished and popular Writers. L'illustrazione Italiana always keeps its readers well-informed in all the Political, Literary, Artistic, and Scientific News of the Peninsula. It enjoys the most extensive circulation of any similar publication in Southern Europe. Its readers are not only to be found in the most cultured society, but also in the homes of the middle-classes throughout Italy. It is a favourite with Foreigners, particularly with English and American Visitors, every important occurrence in Italy being recorded in its pages and simultaneously Illustrated by capable artists.

== Contributors ==
During the late 19th century to early 20th century, L'Illustrazione Italiana gained popularity among the upper-middle class for high-quality articles in the genteel, courtly language of its columnists, and the short story format that Treves introduced written by some of the most important names in Italian literature, and which through the magazine was transformed into a mass-cultural event.

Among its contributors and regular columnists were Tosca librettist Giuseppe Giacosa, poet Giosuè Carducci, Grazia Deledda, Paola Drigo, Gino Nibbi, Alfredo Panzini, Virginia Tango Piatti, Luigi Pirandello (Nobel Prize for Literature), the Verista writer Giovanni Verga, the poet Gabriele D'Annunzio, Luigi Risso Tammeo, the literary critic Luigi Capuana and Edmondo De Amicis, author of the famous novel Cuore, a masterpiece of children's literature, and journalists including Antonio Baldini.

Special holiday numbers featured writers such as Matilde Serao and Ada Negri, while painters such as Eduardo Dalbono, Giulio Aristide Sartorio, Francesco Paolo Michetti, Gioele Ferraguti and Arnaldo Ferraguti provided magnificent illustrations. The latter (unrelated to Gioele) married the niece of the Fratelli brothers and was a leading exponent of Verismo sociale (social realism), a movement Luigi Chirtani called the New School of Truth, its repertoire being bucolic and working-class scenes influenced by fellow artist on the magazine, Michetti. Arnaldo held a passionate interest in the condition of the proletariat and hoped to affect the opinion of the readership–the northern cultural élite–of extreme conditions of life in the camps and of child labour. His aims were shared by the Treves, who sought a 'new iconography' of the newly unified peoples of Italy. Ferraguti's use of photography was scorned by colleagues like Gaetano Previati.

Romani notes the role in the magazine of letters from readers to the publisher, often printed with a reply and prompting further correspondence, in 'creating a dialogic exchange which, in appearances, included all the readers, not only the original sender and receiver.'

== Illustration ==
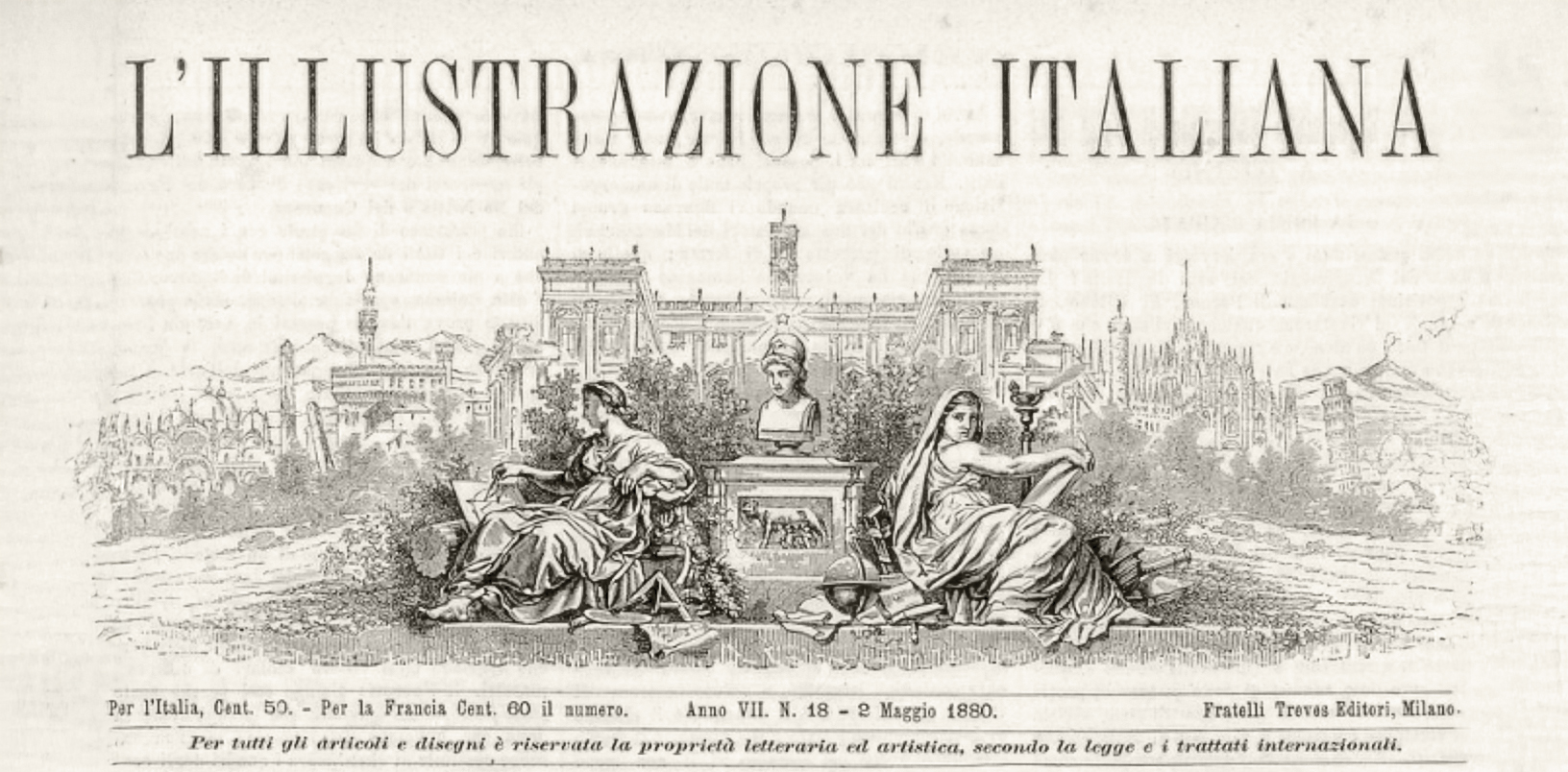
L'Illustrazione Italiana Masthead, 2 May 1880, engraving

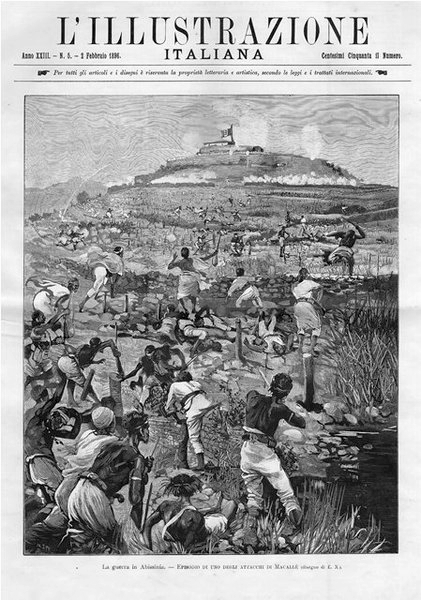
Eduardo Ximenes (1896) First Italo-Ethiopian War: depiction of an attack on Mekelle, engraving.

As befits its name, L'Illustrazione Italiana made an important feature of its pictorial content. Prominent artists contributed, including Achille Beltrame, Giovanni Boldini, Giuseppe Cosenza, Pietro Scoppetta, Luigi Bompard, Dario Querci, Francesco Paolo Michetti, Aleardo Terzi, and Eduardo Ximenes, a founder of the journal and its first art director who promoted and contributed to its geographical content.

Over several tours of duty in Africa, Ximenes was correspondent to L'Illustrazione on the Italian colonies Eritrea and Libya, and his account of incidents of the First Italo-Ethiopian War made over March–June 1896 is amongst the earliest journalistic war reports.

On the 1906 Treves' shrine created by his brother Ettore in Carrara marble, Ximenes designed the 1906 bronze relief, showing the life of publisher Emilio Treves, his brother Giuseppe, his wife the writer Virginia Tedeschi, and the history of their publishing house. Situated in the Jewish Section of the Monumental Cemetery of Milan, it shows the Treves' friends, the writers Gabriele D’Annunzio, Edmondo De Amicis, and Giovanni Verga, with press workers engaged in the modern process of photomechanical printing.

The magazine's printing of illustrations from wood and steel engravings were of a fine quality, such as to present 'a solid, respectable, mannered Italy, in a continuous homage to the national bourgeois mythology'

=== Masthead ===
Piscitelli notes that the original masthead was resplendent with 'a series of elements that had been consolidated in the collective symbolic imaginary of the Italian Risorgimento,' a reunited Italy in which symbols of Rome and icons of Italy are intermingled; a stylised Michelangelo Delphic Sybil beside a relief of the Capitoline Wolf surmounted by a helmeted bust of 'Italy', against a landscape crowded with significant Italian monuments centred on the Campidoglio. That was abandoned for a less elaborate, more compact and modern design after its first four years.

=== Photography ===
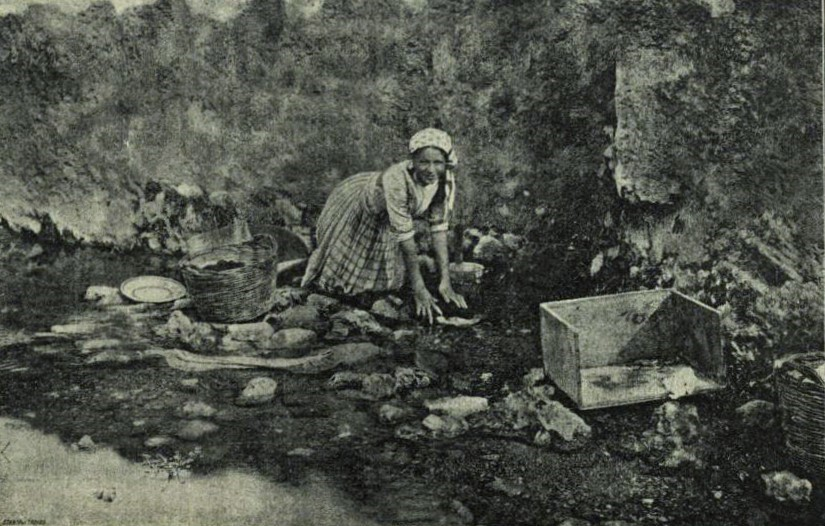
Interguglielmi, Eugenio (1850-1911) In Sicily: a Launderer. L'illustrazione Italiana, n° 46, November 1893

Fine quality was maintained in the magazine's photographic illustrations following the appearance of its first photograph printed in ink (i.e. a photomechanical reproduction), in the issue of July 19, 1885; of a 16th-century sword preserved in the Poldi Pezzoli Museum in Milan, the magazine's headquarters.

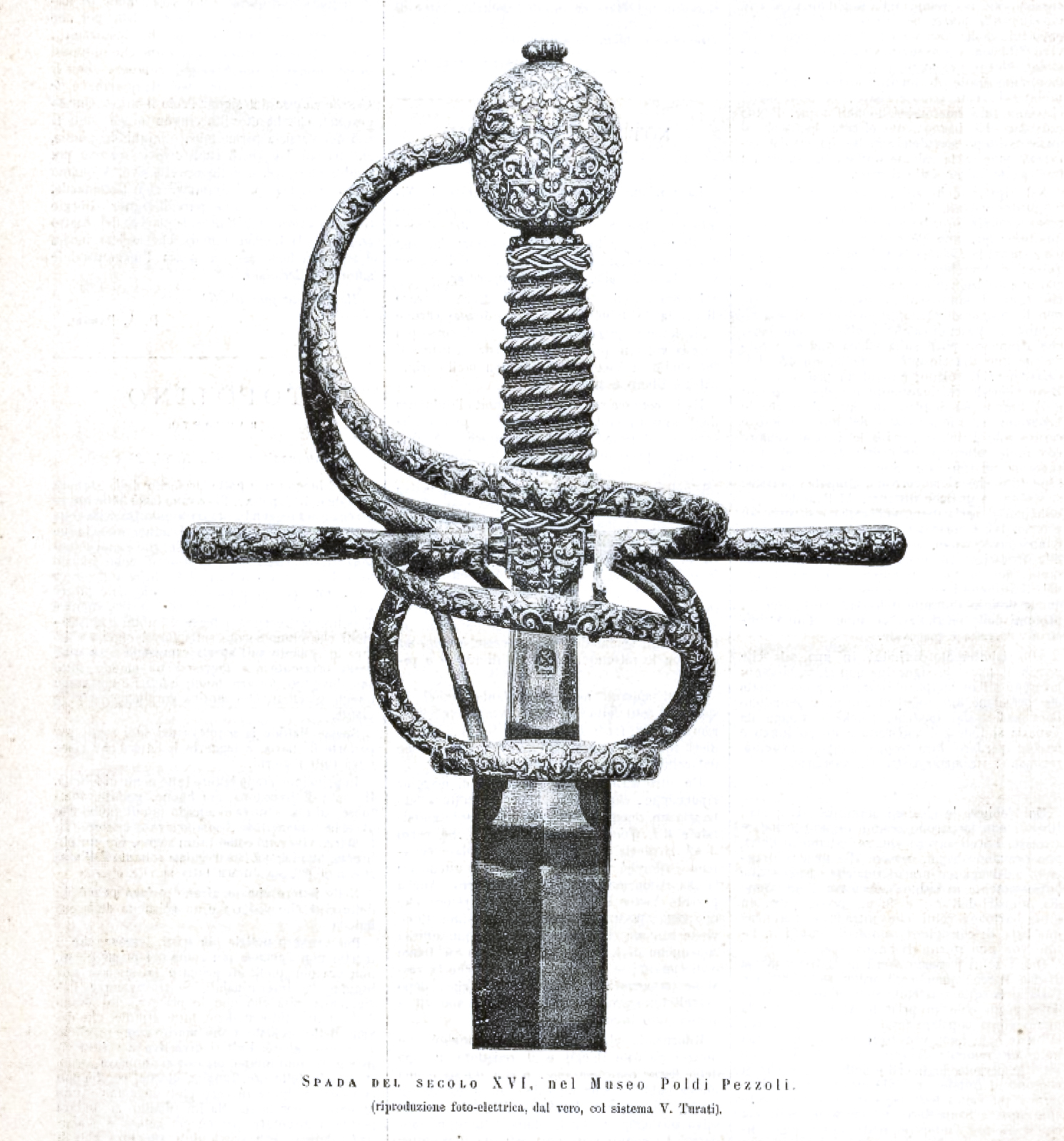
1st photomechanical illustration in L'Illustrazione Italiana (19 July 1885), of a XVI century sword hilt, Poldi Pezzoli Museum using the 'photo-electric' system of Count Vittrio Turati

The technology adopted at first was a version of photozincography, an early photolithography process developed (and patented later, in 1887) by Count Vittorio Turati (1860–1938). The printing is a demonstration of the intricate detail Turati was able to obtain, though the medium was less suited to rendering tonal variation and gradation so was used for a time in the magazine alongside hand-drawn lithography. By the end of the 1880s, halftone printing was being adopted in most countries.

Luca Comerio's photographs of demonstrators, barricades, and the military, in the Bava Beccaris massacre of May 1898 were also published in L'Illustrazione using the early photomechanical processes. Adopting further improvements in ink reproductions of photographs, the magazine introduced rotogravure and coated paper, which guaranteed better image quality, which Cinelli proposes constructed a precise fascist identity and 'self-recognition' stimulating a very strong sense of belonging to the nation.

The magazine commissioned some of the best national photojournalists; Armando Bruni, Carlo Bavagnoli, Mario Crimella, Mario Dondero, Eugenio Interguglielmi, Pietro Marubi, Giulio Parisio and Emilio Sommariva; and internationals, like portraitists Eva Barrett and Ghitta Carell.

== Advertising ==
L'Illustrazione Italiana ranked itself as having 'large circulation [that] renders it most valuable as a means for giving publicity to the larger as well as to the smaller Manufacturing Industries and for Works of Art, Books, &c.' The ample advertising, some in 'full-page ads, some in color,' writes Ipsen, provides an index of Italy's nascent consumer culture. Barron notes that the mouthwash Odol was endorsed in verse on its pages by opera singer Giacomo Puccini on 13 July 1902. Arvidsson sees its mix of 'human interest with infotainment and stories on the wonders of science and industry,' and advertisements popularising new consumer goods by such companies as Borsalino, Cinzano and Campari by French-inspired artists like Adolfo Hohenstein, Leonetto Cappiello, Adolfo de Carolis or Leopoldo Metlicovitz, as presaging that of the 'magazine boom' half a century later.

== Decline ==
From 1909 the brothers Treves were co-directors, but Emilio Treves's death in 1916 marked the beginning of a gradual decline for the magazine under brother Guido from 8 February 1916 until 12 May 1932, despite contributions by high-caliber writers Eugenio Montale, Elio Vittorini, Salvatore Quasimodo, Riccardo Bacchelli, Italo Pietra, Niccolò Giani, Sergio Solmi, and Marco Praga who served as theatre critic from 1919 until his death in 1929, From 1926 Calogero Tumminelli, founder the publishing house Bestelli e Tumminelli in Milan in 1913 and who produced the magazines Dedalo, and Architettura e Arti Decorative, succeeded Giovanni Beltrami was co-director.

=== Under fascism ===
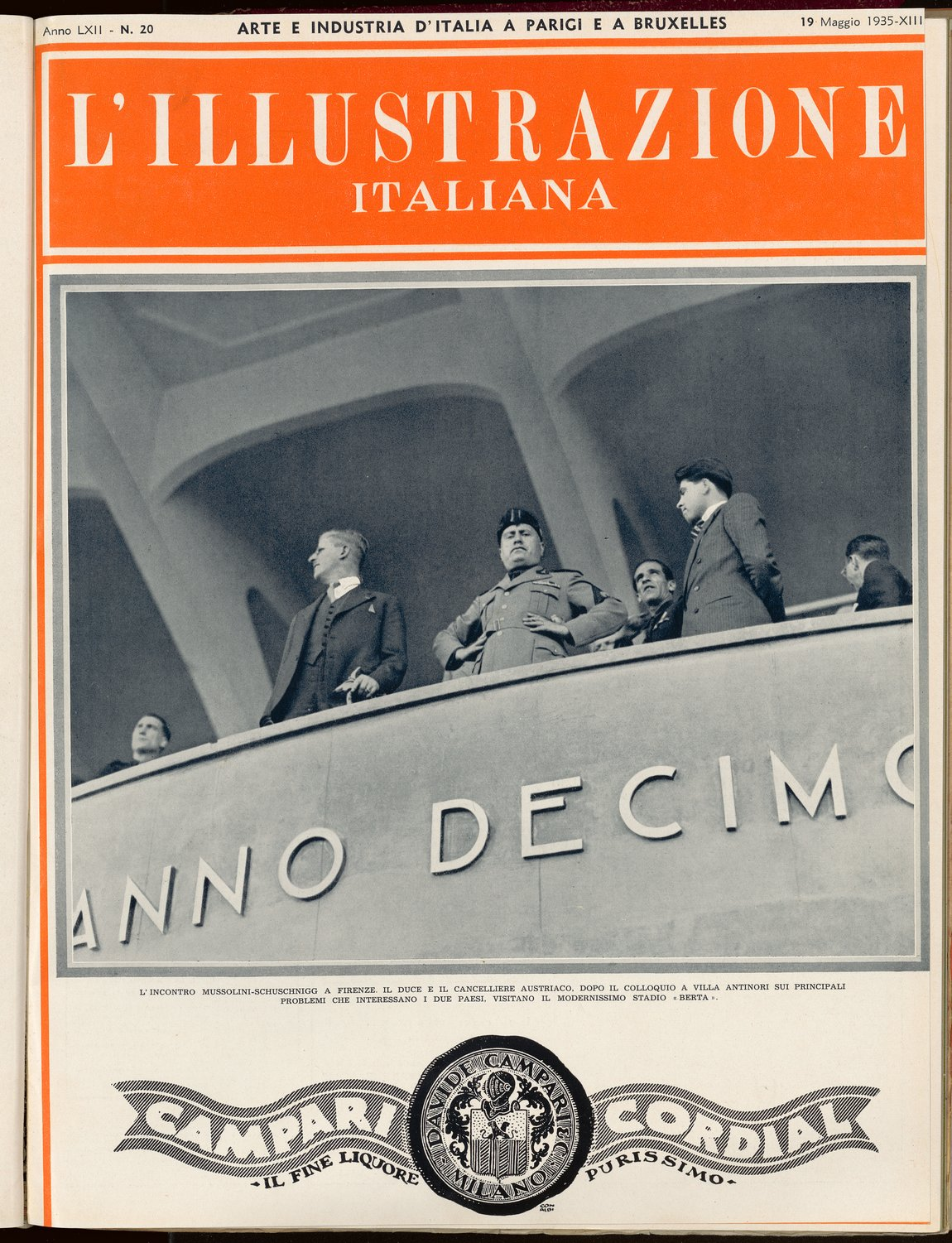
Cover L’illustrazione Italiana LXII n.20, 19 May 1935. Caption: The Mussolini-Schuschnigg meeting in Florence.

As an example of the magazine's shift to the political right, Lasansky identifies a 1934 article by Giovanni Franceschini which compared Mussolini's lavishing 320,000 lire on the restoration of the walls and two castles of Marostica, with the program of the della Scala family during the late 13th and early 14th centuries to expand and fortify small towns, including Marostica, to make them commercial-industrial centres for a transformed demographic. Subtitling his article 'the Fascist Protection of Works of Beauty', Franceschini claimed for Mussolini a populist response to Italians' love of their mediaeval heritage, appropriating it into the Fascist vision of Italic glory.

Dino Alfieri, Minister of People's Culture from 1937, promulgated the fascist racial laws implemented in Italy in 1938 which stripped Jews of their civil rights and removed them from various industries. In September 1938, in preparation for legislation on the 'Jewish question' by the Grand Council of Fascism, Alfieri required every publisher to identify personnel di razza ebraica ('of the Jewish race'). Books by Jews were seized and by February 1939 nine hundred had been banned, and publishing houses were ordered to adopt 'Aryan' names, resulting in the suicide of one, Angelo Fortunato Formiggini.

In 1939 Treves was forced to sell the company to the Aryan Aldo Garzanti, resulting in its embracing the right in political content. Niccolò Giani, an Italian Fascist was amongst the war correspondents for the magazine, while photographer Ghitta Carell contributed pro-fascist imagery, despite her Jewish heritage. Towards mid-1942, due to events of the Second World War, L'Illustrazione's publication slowed.

=== Post-war demise ===
Livio Garzanti took the decision to issue the magazine only monthly from 1951. The fifties saw the dizzying growth of other popular weekly news magazines and television which encroached on the market-share of L'Illustrazione until Garzanti was forced to close it in December 1962.

== Revivals ==
A brief revival attempt was made between 1972 and 1973. The publisher Guanda resumed the newspaper in October 1981 as a bimonthly magazine of graphics, current affairs and new trends. The attempt did not bring the desired financial returns and the magazine ceased again in 1996.

From 2011 publisher My Way Media produced monographic issues of L'Illustrazione Italiana as annotated facsimile editions on a bimonthly basis. As of February 2025, such issues were being published irregularly.

== Directors ==
- Emilio Treves (1873–1908) with Eduardo Ximenes artistic director (1882–1908)
- Raffaello Barbiera (editor-in-chief), 1874–1904
- Alfredo Comandini (editor-in-chief)
- Emilio Treves and Guido Treves (1909 – January 30, 1916)
- Guido Treves (February 8, 1916 – May 12, 1932)
- Giovanni Beltrami, co-director (February 8, 1916 – January 31, 1926)
- Calogero Tumminelli, co-director (1926 – May 12, 1932)
- Calogero Tumminelli (May 1932 – June 1933)
- Giovanni Capodivacca (July 2, 1933 – December 21, 1934)
- Enrico Cavacchioli (January 1935 – January 1939)
- Aldo Garzanti (February 1939 – 1951)
- Pietro Bianchi, editor-in-chief (1949–1951)
- Livio Garzanti (1951–1962)
- Pietro Bianchi, editor-in-chief (1951–1955)
- Gaetano Tumiati, editor-in-chief (1955–1962)
