= Ghitta Carell =

Italian-Hungarian photographer (1899–1972)

Ghitta Carell גיטה קארל
- Born: Ghitta Klein; 20 September 1899; Szatmár County, Hungary
- Died: 18 January 1972 (aged 72); Haifa, Israel

Ghitta Carell (Hebrew: גיטה קארל; 20 September 1899 – 18 January 1972) was the professional name of Ghitta Klein, a naturalized Italian photographer, born in Hungary, who came to prominence between 1930 and 1950. Noted for her portraiture, she was a favored photographer among the aristocracy and despite her Jewish heritage she helped build the imagery used in Fascist propaganda. After the fall of Mussolini, she remained in Italy, though her field of influence was greatly diminished. At the end of the 1960s, she immigrated to Israel, where she died in obscurity. Her archives, preserved by the 3M Foundation, have widely toured throughout Europe and a revival of interest in evaluating her skill as a technician has developed in the 21st century.

== Early life ==
Ghitta Klein, was born on 20 September 1899 in Szatmár County, Hungary to Lotti Sonnenberg and Ignác Klein. Her father was a Jewish shoe factory owner, and her mother was a housewife. She may have studied with the photographer Aladár Székely and then traveled to Vienna and Leipzig to further her training, or she may have simply informally studied such masters of photography as Székely, Ergy Landau, Olga Máté, Nickolas Muray, József Pécsi, and Ilka Révai. Her early biographical record has sparse information and was likely embellished with details of having descended from a wealthy industrial family, prestigious apprenticeships, and her "discovery" after arriving in Italy on vacation and shooting a mythical photograph of a baby which appeared all over Italy on a Fascist propaganda poster.

== Career ==
In 1924, Klein moved to Italy and quickly became involved with the group of Hungarian artists and intellectuals living in Florence. She became known for portraiture, typically using orthochromatic plates to mute reddish skin tones and softened the image further employing diffusion techniques. A skilled retoucher she went to great lengths to conceal her improvements to images, such as sharpening details, increasing the light contrast, and employing airbrush. After she learned Italian, she opened a studio at #13 Viale Milton, in Florence around 1927 and from this time, her portraits of aristocrats began to appear. Her work from 1927, includes likenesses of Countess Anna Boutourline and Teresa Martini Marescotti and from 1928, is a portrait of Baroness Bonacorsa Alliotti. She began publishing images in fashion magazines under the name of Ghitta Carell competing with the British photographer Eva Barrett, for space in publications like L'Illustrazione Italiana. Another possible exaggeration was an often told tale that after taking a photograph of Sophia, Queen Consort of Greece, wrapped in an ermine jacket with a black veil encircling her, Carell was encouraged to go to Rome, by Sophia, who introduced her to court.

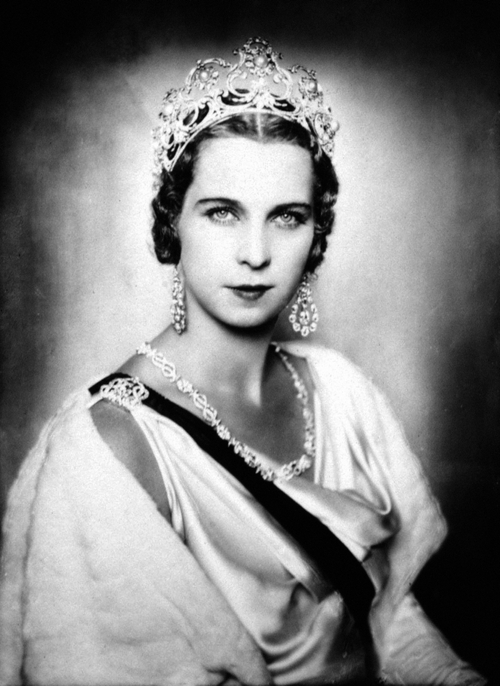
Marie-José of Belgium by Carell, 1946

In Rome, Carell became the photographer for the Italian royal family after her photograph of Mafalda di Savoia, taken in 1928, was published in the March 1929 edition of Le Carnet Mondain, the social register. Around 1930, she met and photographed two of the architects of Fascist propaganda, Margherita Sarfatti and Marcello Piacentini. Sarfatti and Piacentini were key figures in crafting both the political identity of Benito Mussolini and his cultural policies. She took photographs which were collected in an album of the family members of both Sarfatti and Piacentini. Then in 1931, Carell took photographs of Queen Marie José and Mussolini, which were featured alongside photographs taken by Barrett in Le Carnet Mondain.

Though she continued to maintain a studio in Florence, by 1930, Carell was firmly established in Rome and opened a new studio there in 1932, located at #3 Piazza del Popolo. In 1933, she produced the wedding photographs for Sarfatti's daughter Fiammetta to Livio Gaetani, and two years later shot photographs of their first child, Roberto. For several years thereafter, until Barrett retired in 1937, the two women were known to be rivals for the same clients. That year, Carell shot a series of portraits of Mussolini, which were quite different than previous images of him in a militaristic stance with a decisive profile. In Carell's photographs, he was portrayed in almost Hollywood-like glamor, as a refined intellectual, with the only reference to politics being a National Fascist Party badge in his buttonhole. By this time, Carell was fully established as one of the most sought-after photographers in Rome.

At the beginning of World War II, in 1938, Carell came under the scrutiny of the police, but her high-powered relationships allowed her to remain in the country, despite her Jewish heritage. After the war ended, she continued to make photographs of high-powered society figures and in 1959, renounced her Hungarian citizenship to become a naturalized Italian. Her last official portrait was of Pope John XXIII in 1960. In 1969, she donated around 50,000 negatives of her archives to the Ferrania Information Center, which were later consolidated into the 3M Foundation Italia in Milan and moved to Israel.

== Death and legacy ==
Carell died on 8 January 1972 in Haifa and was largely forgotten or dismissed as an ideological photographer until the 21st century, when critical analysis of her techniques renewed. In 2011, a biography, Ghitta Carell was published in Hungarian and followed in 2013, Roberto Dulio published a biography, Un ritratto mondano. Fotografie di Ghitta Carell re-examining her life. After each book was released, an exhibition of her works was presented. The 2011 exhibition which was also shown Geneva, began with a presentation at the Hungarian National Museum, marking the first time Carell's works had been shown in her native land. The 2013 exhibition in Rome, evaluated the influences of Walt Disney and Hollywood on Carell's body of work.
