= Schostal =

Austrian press photo agency

Schostal Photo Agency (German: Agentur Schostal) was an Austrian press photo agency, named for its founder, Robert F. Schostal.

== Photographers ==
The Agency represented 408 photographers. Some are still of renown, such as Trude Fleischmann, Kitty Hoffmann, Manassé, Dr Paul Wolff, Karel Hájek, Imre von Santho, Heinrich Hoffmann, Georges Sand, Willem van de Poll, Bert Longworth, Germaine Krull, Yva, Madame d'Ora and Lotte Jacobi. Especially for the latter Jewish photographers, Schostal was one of the few business to circumvent the Nazi Reich Chamber of Culture (Nationalsozialistische Reichskulturkammer) ban on their employment.

== History ==
Schostal Photo Agency (Agentur Schostal) was founded by brothers Robert and Walter Schostal in 1929, with the aim of producing and distributing photographs both locally and globally. There was a family background in the sale of photography; their aunt, Regine Mattersdorf, owned Magazin Metropol in Vienna, financed by their father, from which she sold postcards, a business that Robert, then 19, and his brother Walter took on, renaming it Vienna Photo Kurier in 1925.

With more than one million photos covering a wide variety of subjects, Agentur Schostal was one of the great agencies of the 1920s and 1930s. The headquarters were in Wieden, the 4th district of Vienna in the former office of Wiener Photo-Kurier. Schostal had representatives and offices in major European cities Paris, Milan, Berlin and Stockholm.

The main customers were print media, including magazines such as Die Dame, Die Woche and Uhu in Austria, Moderne Welt, Die Bühne, Wiener Salonblatt and Wiener Magazin to which Schostal supplied images relating to culture, fashion and glamor. From 1929 it was the Austrian representative of the Keystone Press Agency (London, New York). In the 1930s many leading Italian magazines, including Lei, Natura, Excelsior, Eva and La Rivista Illustrata del Popolo d’Italia, employed the photographs taken by Paul Wolff through Schostal.

In March 1938 German troops invaded Austria. Robert Schostal quickly made a bid to flee the country for Paris where his brother lived, leaving behind the Schostal Agency photographs, but was betrayed and arrested in Klagenfurt. He was released after Studio Madame d'Ora made representations on his behalf, paying for a visa for him and his mother to come to France, though he instead traveled to the United States. Walter Schostal arranged for customers outside of Germany and Austria to invoice their office in Paris instead of Vienna, but with France's declaration of war in 1939, the Paris branch had to close and in 1941 the entire Schostal family reunited in New York.

in Vienna, though his close relations with Nazi officials of the Reichspressekammer Friedrich Gondosch, also a photographer and whose pictures are in the collection, was able to take over the Schostal agency. The photographs were subsequently used for propaganda, rebranded with the stamp "Wien Bild" followed by the banner P.P.P. Photos für Presse und Propaganda ('PPP photos for press and propaganda').

After the Second World War, in 1948, the agency, which was then under Soviet control, closed. Robert made unsuccessful efforts from America to recover the archive. However, some of the photos were hidden in a basement, and Friedrich Gondosch vanished, perhaps fearing reprisal.

== Rediscovery ==
In 1992, an unnamed Swiss art dealer discovered approximately 130,000 well-preserved photographs bearing the Schostal Agency stamp, more than 40 years after the agency went out of business in 1948. Parts of the collection that were discovered in 1992 were sold or auctioned off to various institutions. The German Historical Museum bought 40,000 photos in 1995, The Hamburg Museum of Arts and Crafts bought 350 fashion photographs, and some went to the Austrian National Library.

Isolated prints bearing the Schostal agency stamp have surfaced intermittently at art auctions. A bulk of the photographs are owned by the Austrian publisher Christian Brandstätter, the founder of IMAGNO Brandstätter Institute, a leading historical picture agency in Austria that has 300,000 Schostal photographs in their holdings. How this company acquired the majority of photographs is unknown, as the number in its collection surpasses the 130,000 prints discovered in 1992.

A portion of this collection, 5,066 gelatin silver prints, 58 information sheets, and 34 photograph envelopes made between 1927 and 1945, was anonymously donated to the Art Gallery of Ontario (AGO) in 2008.
