= Emilio Trèves =

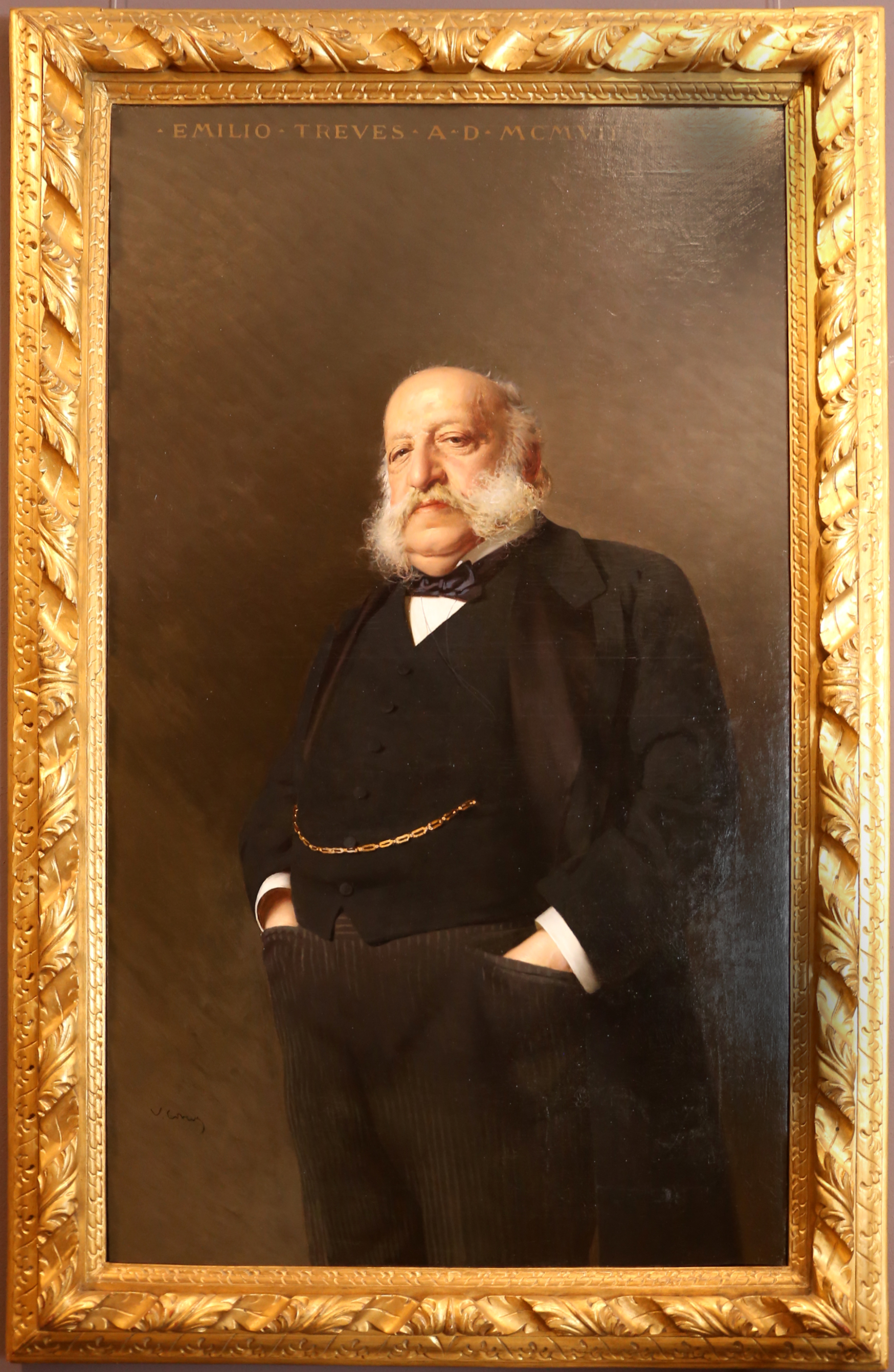
- Portrait of Emilio Trèves by Vittorio Matteo Corcos, 1907
- Born: Emilio Salomone Trèves; 31 December 1834; Trieste
- Died: 30 January 1916 (aged 81); Milan, Italy
- Occupations: Publisher, editor

Emilio Salomone Trèves (1834–1916) was an Italian writer and publisher, founder of the Fratelli Treves publishing house.

== Biography ==
=== Early years ===
Emilio Salomone Trèves was born on the 31 December, 1834, to Lia Montalcini and Sabato Graziadio Trèves, the Chief Rabbi of Trieste. Lia Montalcini had three daughters from the first marriage: Annetta, Esterina and Rosa. With Sabato, she had three sons: Enrico Michele, Emilio Salomone and the youngest, Giuseppe Emanuele. Trèves attended the Jewish elementary school and the Royal Imperial Gymnasium of Trieste, but there is no record of him pursuing a regular university education (the title ‘Dr’ E. Treves appears only rarely in later documents).

Trèves emerged as a writer at a very young age, he debuted with a drama entitled Ricchezza e miseria (Wealth and Misery), written between 1848 and 1851. His second literary work, the five-act historical drama Il duca di Enghien (The Duke of Enghien), was published in 1853. The play was banned by the Austrian censors because it clearly expressed opposition to Austrian rule and called for the restoration of Trieste’s Italian identity. Trèves was actively involved in the anti-Habsburg unrest in Trieste at that time. When in 1853 his elder brother Enrico Michele was arrested and sentenced to 4 years in prison for keeping anti-Austrian publications, Trèves left Trieste and moved to Paris.

The bustling life of the French capital influenced him and his tastes greatly: he frequented literary salons and cafes, editorial offices and publishing houses, learning the trade of journalism and publishing. The magazine Musée de Famille inspired him for what later became his first publication as a publisher in Milan, Museo di famiglia illustrated periodical. He lived in Paris for two years; to earn a living, he gave private lessons of Italian language, contributed to the compilation of Italian-French dictionaries, and worked for the newspaper Courrier franco-italien.

In June 1856 his father died, and in the autumn of that same year Trèves briefly rejoined his family in Trieste, then left again – first to Fiume, where he worked at Eco di Fiume under Giovanni Spagnolo, then to Udine. In 1858, Trèves arrived in Milan and started working at Gazzetta Ufficiale di Milano, first as a translator, then as an art and literary critic. Upon getting more experienced, he headed Uomo di Pietra, a magazine founded back in 1856. As a columnist, he wrote for Uomo di Pietra under the pseudonym Il Piovano. After some time, Trèves was appointed political editor of the Gazzetta d'Italia, which was, however, shut down before it began publication. In 1859, Trèves joined Garibaldi and volunteered for the Cacciatori delle Alpi in 1859, eventually rising to the rank of sergeant. He took part in numerous military operations against the Austrians.

=== Fratelli Trèves Publishers ===
Although Trèves had not originally planned to stay in Milan for long and intended to return to Paris as soon as possible, he ended up spending the rest of his life in the capital of Lombardy, where he also built his career as a publisher and owner of a publishing house. From 1859, he ceased to use the name Salomone and began signing documents as Emilio, distancing himself from his Jewish roots.

The publishing house was founded on 1 January 1861. Between 1861 and 1864, Trèves opened his first small publishing studio located at 29 Via Durini, the company was called ‘Editori della Biblioteca Utile’. There he launched his first magazine, Museo di Famiglia, followed by Annuario Scientifico. After a few years, Trèves decided to expand and seized the opportunity that presented itself: in May 1868, the Hungarian refugee printer Helphy intended to return to his homeland, and Treves bought his typography at 11 Via Solferino, on favourable terms. He immediately launched several new magazines, expanded the publication of literary works and increased print runs.

In 1870, Trèves brought his younger brother Giuseppe Emanuele into the business, entrusting him with the organisation and financial management of the company. In 1872, when the collaboration between the two brothers became permanent, the publishing house took on its definitive name of ‘Fratelli Treves’. The corporate restructuring enabled Emilio to bring his project for a large-format illustrated newspaper to fruition, modelled on the newspapers published in European capitals.

The 1870s and 1880s marked a golden age for the publishing house; Trèves discovered authors such as Gabriele D’Annunzio, Edmondo de Amicis, Giovanni Verga, and many others whose works have since become classics. Treves practically monopolised the publishing market; he was considered the most influential editor, and every author dreamed of being published by him. Trèves published the first Italian translations of works by foreign classics such as Gustave Flaubert, Émile Zola, Paul Bourget, Guy de Maupassant, as well as Russian writers such as Leo Tolstoy, Fyodor Dostoevsky, Ivan Turgenev, and many more. The cultural contribution of the Fratelli Trèves publishing house to the development of post-Risorgimento Italy can hardly be overestimated.

=== Other works ===
For 15 years, Trèves served as president of the National Typographical and Booksellers’ Association, he initiated the relocation of its headquarters from Florence to Milan and rebuilt the organization on a solid foundation. He was also a co-founder and vice president of the Italian Society of Authors and Publishers and an advocate of laws and regulations to recognize the immediate and posthumous rights of intellectual works and to strengthen author's rights protection in Italy.

=== Personal life ===
In the late 1850s in Milan, he met Suzette Thompson, a young Englishwoman who had come to Italy to study music. He married Suzette in London on June 1, 1863. Their only daughter, Maria, was born in 1864.

Friends and colleagues recalled him as a tireless worker who only slept five hours a day, from 22 PM to 2 AM. He was very straightforward and had earned the nickname “ogre,” which suited him well also given his physical appearance. In 1889, when Trèves met Gabriele D’Annunzio for the first time, the two became close friends immediately. They lost contact for a while when in 1891 Trèves refused to publish The Intruder, but rekindled in 1893. They stayed close for more than 20 years, the preserved correspondence shows that their relationship went beyond the professional sphere, and Treves often forgave his friend for his complaints about fees, advances and contracts.

He never allowed himself to show weakness; his colleagues recalled a rare incident when Trèves arrived at the editorial office one morning and, upon seeing a manuscript on his desk from an author named Gotta, exclaimed, ‘I will never publish an author with a surname like that!’ (In Italian, “gotta” means gout.) In reality, Trèves suffered from a severe form of gout and was often plagued by pain.

Trèves died in Milan on 30 January, 1916. His death was symbolic of the end of an era: that of pioneering and romantic Italian publishing, which was to be replaced by the industrial logic of the 20th century. The mark left by Trèves on Italian publishing remains indelible, as he helped lay the foundations upon which Italian culture would develop in the following century.

== Literature ==
- Caccia, Patrizia (2013). Editori a Milano (1900-1945). Repertorio: Repertorio. FrancoAngeli. p. 309.
- Lopez, Guido (1970). "Infanzia e giovinezza di un grande editore : Emilio Treves". La Rassegna Mensile di Israel. 36 (7/9): 213–231.
- Caliaro, Ivano (2001). "Emilio Treves a Gabriele D'Annunzio" (PDF). Lettere ai Treves: 787–790.
