= Ottavia Vitagliano =

Italian writer

Ottavia Vitagliano (née: Mellone; 1894–1975) was an Italian writer, editor and publisher.

The daughter of Igino Mellone and Giulia Piacentini, she was born in Milan. She became manager for her own publishing house and founded and edited various periodicals: Excelsior, Zenit, Le Vostre Novelle and Eva, most of these targeting a literate female audience. These publications were all Milan-based weekly illustrated magazines (Italian: Rotocalchi) which made her one of the leading magazine publishers of the period like Mondadori and Rizzoli.

By 1939, she was married to Nino Vitagliano. She was editor for the magazine Casa e Moda, which however shut down within a year. Other periodicals that she was associated with after World War II include Novella 2000, Settimo Giorno, Novelle film and Rossana. She also published the children's magazine Libro e Moschetto, which was based on Fascist principles.

She used the pen name Sonia.

Vitagliano was named Commendatore Ordine al Merito della Repubblica Italiana. She died in Milan.

== Selected works ==
Some of her works included the following:

- Oh, divina bellezza (1936)
- Il Capitano Cip, children's novel, with Mario Mortara (1940)
- Proibito sognare (1965)
