= Pál Funk =

Hungarian photographer

Pál Funk, born Pál Pinkász, known professionally also as Angelo, (31 January 1894, Budapest, Hungary –13 December 1974, Budapest, Hungary) was a leading twentieth-century photographer in Hungary. He was also a cinematographer and fashion designer.

== Early life ==
He was partly of Italian ancestry, and his family had included many artists. His great-grandfather, Alessandro Angelo, the creator of the frescoes at the Hofburg in Vienna, and also, reputedly, designed sets for Gioachino Rossini. The artist members of the family adopted the artist name "Angelo" in honor of their famous predecessor.

Pal Funk began to take photographs at ten, but his arts studies were not limited to photography: in 1910 he attended Carl Bauer's painting school in Munich and then the Peters photography studio in Hamburg, the Dührkopp-studio in Berlin, in the studios of Rudolf Dührkoop and Nicola Perscheidin Berlin, with Léopold-Émile Reutlinger in Paris, with Marcus Adams and with E. O. Hoppé in London. He returned home from France in 1914 and then spent four years in the Army during the First World War.

His wife, Anna Misley, was a dancer at the Opera House.

== Career ==
Returning home, he began working in the studio of Aladár Székely in Budapest as a first assistant, and after a few unsuccessful attempts, he opened his first studio in 1919 at 14 Vilmos császár út. From 1920 to 1946 his studio was located at Budapest, IV. Váci St. Not long after, he was photographing again in Paris and Nice, and then, until 1938, worked in Paris and Amsterdam, in temporary studios.

Among the names he used internationally are P. F. Angelo, Angelo Pál, Paul Angelo, Funk Pál, and Funk Pinkász.

In 1923 he also worked in Paris as a fashion- and costume-designer.

Between the wars, his work appeared in magazines such as Vanity Fair, Harper‘s Bazaar, Cinéma, Die Dame, Berliner Leben, Berliner Zeitung Illustrirte.

In 1926 he was made a member of the Royal Photographic Society of Great Britain.

Amongst those he photographed were Charlie Chaplin, Serge Lifar, Josephine Baker, Vaslav Nijinsky, Isadora Duncan, Pablo Picasso and Béla Bartók.

On the pedagogical side, he gave more than seventy lectures on Hungarian photography, the aesthetics of modern photography, and portrait and nude photography. He was also the chairman of the Master of Photographers Examination Committee.

Between 1927 and 1937 he wrote dozens of articles for Fotóművészeti Hírek (Photography News journal) and from 1934 to 1938 he was one of the editors of the journal Magyar Fotográfia (Hungarian Photography).

During World War II, he was detained by the Gestapo due to his Jewish origins, however, he luckily managed to escape the fate of many other Hungarian Jews.

== Filmmaking ==
He first became involved in film-making during WW1, working with Mihály Kertész (Michael Curtiz) from 1916, and then spent several months a year on the filming of Franco-British Film Co.. He has also worked for Metro-Goldwyn-Mayer, with such big-name artists as Rex Ingram, Erich Pommer, Fritz Lang, Alexander Wolkoff, Ernst Lubitsch and Harry Lachman.

According to some sources, he shot the first Hungarian sound film. He was also involved in the filming of the first commercial film, in 1927. The cameraman was István Eiben. According to some sources, he worked regularly with motion pictures for seven, others for more than ten years.

== Post-WW2 career ==
In 1945, he launched the Angelo Fotó Akadémiát (Angelo Photography Academy), to which he sought to invite renowned photographers as tutors.

In addition to studio photography, he was also significantly involved in the establishment and operation of professional organizations. After the Second World War, he took part in the operation of the association of Hungarian amateur photographers, MADOME, and in 1956 he was also a founding member of the Association of Hungarian Photographers.

His studio was nationalized in 1951, and from then on he worked as a simple skilled worker, a member of the Budapesti Fényképész Kisipari Termelő Szövetkezet (Budapest Photographer's Small-Scale Production Cooperative) – however in the same premises as his studio. Angelo tried to meet the expectations of the age, he became a stakhanovite of the cooperative, photographing an estimated 450,000 people during his career. In addition to his work for the cooperative, he photographed more and more for his own pleasure, to satisfy his artistic inclinations. His late images have no living figures, his pictorial world had become surreal and alien.

== Retrospectives ==
- Seelenverwandt. Ungarische Fotografen 1914 - 2003, Martin-Gropius-Bau, Berlin, 10 Jun – 29 Aug 2005
- Mouvement, rythme, danse - Les débuts de la danse moderne en Hongrie (1902-1950), Institut Hongrois, Paris, 7 Nov – 14 Dec 2013
- Kindred Spirits. Péter Nádas and Hungarian Photography 1912-2003, Fotomuseum Den Haag, Den Haag, 25 Sep 2004 – 3 Jan 2005,
