= Fratelli Treves =

Italian publisher (1861–1939)

Fratelli Treves Editori
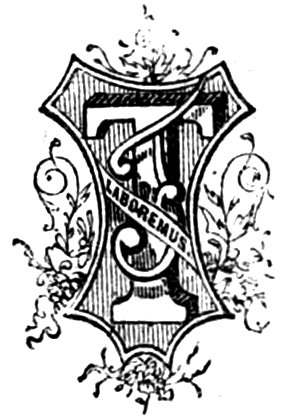
- Status: Defunct
- Founded: 1861
- Founder: Emilio Treves
- Defunct: 1939; 87 years ago
- Country of origin: Italy
- Headquarters location: Milan

Fratelli Treves was an Italian publishing house based in Milan. Founded in 1861 by Emilio Treves from Trieste, it was active until 1939, when the publishing house had to cease operations because of fascist racial laws. In the late XIX — early XX centuries, the Treves publishing house was the most influential in Italy and worked with the best poets and writers of its time.

== History ==
=== XIX century ===
The publishing house was founded on 1 January 1861 under the name of the founder, Emilio Trèves. Between 1861 and 1864, Treves opened his first small publishing studio located at 29 Via Durini, the company was called ‘Editori della Biblioteca Utile’. There he created his first magazine, Museo di Famiglia, followed by Annuario Scientifico. At first, the publications were published externally at Pietro Agnelli's typography. After a few years, Treves decided to expand and seized the opportunity that presented itself: in May 1868, the Hungarian refugee printer Helphy intended to return to his homeland, and Treves bought his typography at 11 Via Solferino, on favourable terms. He immediately launched several new magazines: the Biblioteca Amena, the Universo Illustrato (a more comprehensive version of the Museo di Famiglia), the Romanziere Illustrato, and the Giornale dei Viaggi.

In 1868 he published in the series Biblioteca utile (nº 84), one of the first works by Edmondo De Amicis, La vita militare; the writer established a lasting professional collaboration with the publishing house. Unlike many other publishers, Treves did not devote himself to feuilletons, but published literary works of the scapigliatura, suitable for an educated public, by authors such as Iginio Ugo Tarchetti and Antonio Ghislanzoni. Notably, in 1869 they launched the daily newspaper ‘Corriere di Milano’. It lasted until 1874 under editor-in-chief Eugenio Torelli Viollier; it was from this “Corriere” that he drew the idea for the ‘Corriere della Sera’, which he directed and founded in 1876.

In 1872, Trèves associated his younger brother Giuseppe (1838-1904) with the management. He entrusted to him all the administrative and commercial aspects. Giuseppe, by then a seasoned traveller and businessman, had invested his savings and the dowry of his wife, Virginia Dolci Tedeschi, in the venture. In 1872, when the collaboration became continuous, the publishing house took the definitive name of Fratelli Treves.

On 1 December 1873 the Trèves brothers acquired a Roman magazine, L'Illustrazione. Rivista italiana, directed by the Roman artist Alessandro Foli, in 1874 and for the merger starting 1 November 1875, their weekly adopted the title L'Illustrazione Italiana.

Subsequently Trèves approached verismo by publishing the then unknown Giovanni Verga (Eva, 1873), which became a huge success. In a few years the publishing house started collaborations with the best Italian writers of the time. Among others: Anton Giulio Barrili, Vittorio Bersezio, Camillo Boito, Giacinto Gallina, Gerolamo Rovetta, Emilio De Marchi, Maria Virginia Fabroni, Cordelia (pseudonym of Virginia Tedeschi-Treves, wife of Giuseppe Treves) and Gabriele D'Annunzio. Treves published the first Italian translations of works by foreign writers such as Flaubert, Zola, Bourget, Maupassant, Tolstoy, Dostoevsky, Turgenev and Gorky, Sienkiewicz and Samuel Smiles.

In 1881, the publishing house outgrew its premises and moved to via Palermo, 12.

In the late 1880s, the Fratelli Treves also started to appeal to the general public. By that point, his publishing house became a trusted point of reference for the Italian cultural world, while Emilio Trèves became one of Italy’s most sought-after editors. On 17 October 1886, Heart by De Amicis was published. The work was an immediate success and in a few months passed the forty editions. In 1889 the list of writers was enriched by the arrival of Gabriele D'Annunzio, the best known poet at the time. At that point, Treves practically monopolised the national book market, he was the one to work with the leading writers of the time.

Between the end of the century and the beginning of the next, two new illustrated newspapers came out: Corriere illustrato (weekly, which however suffered competition from Luigi Albertini's powerful Domenica del Corriere) and Il Secolo XX (1902 [9] - 1913 [10 ]; in 1927 it passed to Rizzoli, which published it until 1933, a monthly, conceived in response to La Lettura, another creation by Albertini), in which Gabriele D'Annunzio, Raffaello Barbiera, Ada Negri and Ugo Ojetti collaborated. Among the designers of the first page appeared the signatures of Duilio Cambellotti, Rodolfo Paoletti and Luigi Bompard.

=== XX century ===
In 1904, after the premature death of Giuseppe Trèves, Emilio decided to open the publishing house to external sources of financing, setting up an anonymous company. Emilio Trèves himself, Giuseppe's widow Virginia, and Banca Zaccaria Pisa bought the main shares. The company management was shared between Emilio and his nephew Guido Trèves, son of his brother Enrico.

The activity of the publishing house went through a period of constant expansion: in the decade 1900-1910 production rose from 88 new titles a year to 188 (not counting the reissues of dictionaries and school books). Among the new collaborations, those with the writers Luigi Capuana were noted, Luigi Pirandello and Federigo Tozzi. Among the foreigners, the presence of Herbert George Wells stands out. In 1911 Treves inaugurated the first bookstore abroad, opening in Buenos Aires.

Also noteworthy is the reissue of Quo vadis? by Sienkiewicz in 1914 which, in an unusual editorial initiative for the time, was accompanied by 78 still photographs taken from the homonymous film by Enrico Guazzoni, released in 1913.

In 1916 the founder Emilio Trèves and his wife Virginia died; the company remained in the hands of their nephew Guido and his wife Antonietta Pesenti, who appointed Giovanni Beltrami as managing director. The publishing house continued its activity, however holding up the growing competition with difficulty. He also kept a first-rate catalogue: he published works by Giuseppe Antonio Borgese, Marino Moretti, Ugo Ojetti, Alfredo Panzini, Grazia Deledda, Luciano Zuccoli, Rosso di San Secondo and Sem Benelli.

In 1926, after the death of Beltrami, Calogero Tumminelli took over the leadership of Treves. In 1931 Tumminelli Editore merged with the Treves and Treccani publishing houses, forming SA Treves-Treccani-Tumminelli, which was directed by Tumminelli himself. In 1929, it published Francesco Salata's Per la storia diplomatica della Questione romana.

In 1931, Treves acquired the Milan-based art publisher Bestetti e Tumminelli, as well as the Roman-based Anonima libraria italiana and La Societa anonima istituto Giovanni Treccani. After the acquisition, the merged company was renamed Treves, Treccani e Tumminelli.

The sudden death of Guido Trèves (12 May 1932) caused the dissolution of the partnership. In 1933, the publishing house was re-established as an independent enterprise under the leadership of Antonietta Pesenti (Guido’s widow); however, the company, lacking sufficient capital, lost most of its authors within a few years and was unable to make the necessary investments in modernising its printing equipment, which quickly became obsolete.

In 1939, the Forlì-based industrialist Aldo Garzanti bought the company for a nominal fee: according to the fascist racial laws, all Jews were banned from doing business in Italy, so the Treves family no longer could own the company. Aldo Garzanti transformed it into his own publishing house, "Aldo Garzanti editore già Fratelli Treves".

== Literature ==
- Caccia, Patrizia (2013). Editori a Milano (1900-1945). Repertorio. FrancoAngeli. p. 309.
