= Giovanni Tumiati =

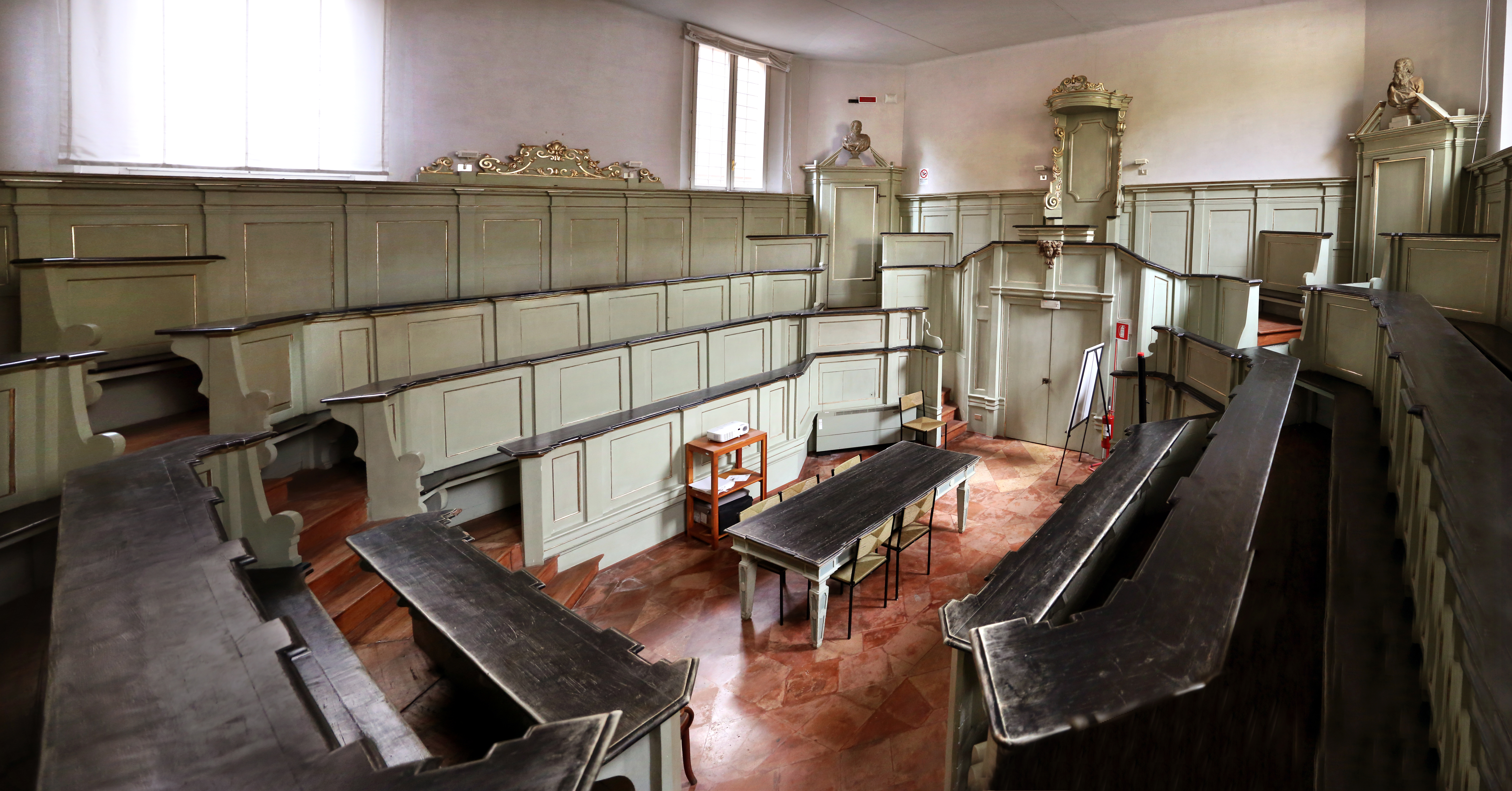

Giovanni Tumiati (1761–10 March 1804) was a physician and anatomist, active mainly in his native Ferrara.

== Biography ==
He was born in Cologna, near Ferrara. He apprenticed in medicine under his paternal uncle, Domenico. He then moved to study philosophy under Francesco Corbi at the University of Ferrara, then medicine. After graduation, he served as a physician at Pontelagoscuro, just north of Ferrara, where he was able to dissect cadavers from the Hospital of Sant’Anna. In 1790, he was named lettore straordinario (extraordinary lecturer of anatomy at the University of Ferrara, and four years later he was named to a professorship patronized by Cardinal Zelada. He also obtained teaching positions for physiology, pathology, and in 1797 of obstetrics. Tumiati in these positions started gathering educational exhibits; he engaged with the construction of wax anatomic models, made by the artist Giuseppe Chiappi. After some educational reforms in 1771, Tumiati supported allowing women to attend anatomy and obstetric lessons; previously they had only been allowed training as midwives.

In 1799-1800 he published his three volume opus of Elementi di anatomia. After the withdrawal of Napoleonic forces from Ferrara, Tumiati was dismissed from his positions. A plaque on the church of San Matteo in Ferrara, recalls his life.

His named is attached to historical anatomy exhibits of the University of Ferrara. Notable in the History of Anatomical studies in Ferrara include the Teatro Anatomico (Anatomical theatre) designed in 1731 by the architect Francesco Mazzarelli in the Palazzo del Paradiso. The anatomic exhibits, closed after the death of Tumiati, were redisplayed in 1831 under the guidance of the Professors Lionello Poletti and Carlo Grillenzoni. Later the collection was consolidated with the help of Doctor Federico Zuffi and Dr Cottica. The collections were moved around buildings in Ferrara till new modern display halls at Via Fossato di Mortara# 66 were refurbished in the late 20th-century.
