= Eva (Italian magazine) =

Women's magazine in Italy (1933–1968)

- Categories: Women's magazine
- Frequency: Weekly
- Publisher: Edizioni Vitagliano
- Founder: Ottavia Vitagliano
- Founded: 1933
- Final issue: 1968
- Company: Edizioni Vitagliano; Rusconi (from 1964)
- Country: Italy
- Based in: Milan
- Language: Italian

Eva was a weekly women's magazine which was published between 1933 and 1968 in Milan, Italy, with a two-year interruption. Its subtitle was settimanale per la donna italiana. Eva was one of the leading illustrated magazines (Italian: Rotocalchi) of the period.

== History and profile ==
Eva was launched by Ottavia Vitagliano in 1933, and its first issue appeared in April that year. Its publisher was Edizioni Vitagliano based in Milan. In 1964 Rusconi acquired the magazine and owned it until 1968 when it was folded. The magazine temporarily ceased publication between 1943 and 1945. It had 11 black and white pages at the start. Its page number was expanded to 32 in the period between 1952 and 1953. The magazine was published in oversize tabloid format using a velvet-like rotogravure printing.

== Content ==
Eva was a mainstream women's magazine and covered articles on fashion, beauty hints, material on home and family. During its early phase Eva covered news about royal families and the Mussolini family. Its fashion content was very comprehensive. In addition, it frequently featured news about the leading American movie stars. The magazine had an advice column, Solo per te – lettere a Sonia, targeting women. Ottavia Vitagliano edited this column under her pseudonym Sonia. It also featured romantic fiction and featured the week's horoscope. Like many other leading Italian magazines of the 1930s Eva employed the photographs taken by the German photographer Paul Wolff through the Schostal agency.
