= Gaetano Tumiati =

Italian journalist, writer and literary critic

Gaetano Tumiati (6 May 1918 – 28 October 2012) was an Italian journalist, writer and literary critic.

== Background ==
Born in Ferrara, Italy, nephew of actor Gualtiero Tumiati, he published his first stories when he was 20 in the newspaper Oggi by Arrigo Benedetti and Mario Pannunzio.

After the Second World War, in which he was taken prisoner and interned in a prison camp in Hereford, Texas, Tumiati was devoted entirely to journalism: special correspondent at first for Avanti then for La Stampa, he was editor of the magazine llustrazione italiana and finally deputy director of Panorama.

He was author of several novels and essays: his novel Il busto di gesso (The plaster bust) won the 1976 Premio Campiello.
