= La lupa =

La lupa is Italian for "the she-wolf", a female wolf.

La lupa can refer to the mythological she-wolf that suckled Romulus and Remus and became a symbol of the city of Rome.

La lupa Capitolina is the Italian name of the Capitoline Wolf, the famous statue of the mythical she-wolf in the National Museum of Rome.

== Films ==
- La lupa, a 1953 film adaptation by Alberto Lattuada of Giovanni Verga's short story
- La lupa, a 1955 film by Luis Lucia
- La lupa, a 1996 film adaptation by Gabriele Lavia of Giovanni Verga's short story
  - La Lupa, a 1996 soundtrack album by Ennio Morricone, and its theme track
- La lupa mannara, a 1976 Italian film

== Literature and media ==
- La Lupa (magazine), an early fascist magazine founded by Paolo Orano
- La Lupa (story), a short story by Giovanni Verga
- La Lupa (Swiss singer), artist

== Other uses ==
- Acca Larentia (Roman mythology), the adopted mother of Romulus and Remus, and by some accounts a prostitute ("lupa")
- A nickname of Anna Magnani, Italian stage and film actress

== See also ==
- Lupa (disambiguation)
- She-wolf (disambiguation)
- Romulus and Remus
