= La Terra Trema =

- Italian theatrical release poster
- Directed by: Luchino Visconti
- Screenplay by: Antonio Pietrangeli; Luchino Visconti
- Based on: I Malavoglia by Giovanni Verga
- Produced by: Salvo D'Angelo; Luchino Visconti
- Narrated by: Luchino Visconti
- Cinematography: Aldo Graziati
- Edited by: Mario Serandrei
- Music by: Willy Ferrero
- Production company: AR.TE.AS Film; Universalia Film
- Distributed by: Compagnia Edizioni Internazionali Artistiche Distribuzione
- Release date: 2 September 1948
- Running time: 165 minutes
- Country: Italy
- Languages: Sicilian; Italian

La Terra Trema (Italian pronunciation: [la ˈtɛrra ˈtrɛːma]; "The Earth Trembles") is a 1948 Italian neorealist film directed, co-written, and produced by Luchino Visconti. A loose adaptation of the 1881 novel I Malavoglia by Giovanni Verga, the film documents the economic and personal struggles of poor Sicilian fishermen. The film is docufictional, featuring a cast of non-professional actors and a mix of scripted and unscripted sequences. It is considered one of the essential films of the neorealist movement and was named one of the top ten films of all time in the 1962 Sight & Sound poll.

In 2008, the film was included on the Italian Ministry of Cultural Heritage’s 100 Italian films to be saved which is a list of 100 films that "have changed the collective memory of the country between 1942 and 1978."

== Plot ==
The film is divided into five sections: a prologue, three main phases, and an epilogue.

The Valastro is a family of working-class fishermen in Aci Trezza, a small fishing village on the east coast of Sicily. The first phase tells about the fishermen's attempt to improve their economic circumstances. They demand a better price for their fish and are urged by the eldest son Ntoni to throw the wholesalers' scales into the ocean but end up in jail. The wholesalers realize it is more profitable to have the fishermen work, so they have them released. Ntoni, having lived on the mainland for a time, has brought some new open-minded ideas back to Sicily, and he tries to form a cooperative, but no one joins him. In deciding to do it on his own, he convinces his family to mortgage their house to buy a boat and start his new life.

The second part shows the Valastros' vulnerability. They realize that the price of being owners is high. When they go out in a particularly bad storm, their new boat is severely damaged, and the Valastros have no money to get it repaired. The other fishermen and the wholesalers mock them, convinced of the immutability of the prevailing social order.

The third phase of the film affirms the Valastros' vulnerability and traces their decline. The social and psychological consequences of the Valastros' attempt to change things are gradually revealed. They are out of work, no one wants to give them any opportunity, and the wholesalers can set the price for their fish. Cola runs away to seek a better life.

In the epilogue, Ntoni is overcome by poverty and hunger, and goes, with his two young brothers, Vanni and Alessio, to work as a day laborer for the wholesalers, who have bought new boats.

== Cast ==
- Antonio Arcidiacono as Ntoni Valastro
- Maria Micale as Signora Valastro
- Sebastiano Valastro as Signor Valastro
- Antonio Micale as Vanni
- Nelluccia Giammona as Mara
- Agnese Giammona as Lucia
- Giuseppe Arcidiacono as Cola
- Salvatore Vicari as Alfio
- Alfio Fichera as Michele
- Ignazio Maccarone as Maccarone
- Lorenzo Valastro as Lorenzo
- Antonino Valastro as Pandolla
- Nicola Castorino as Nicola
- Rosa Catalano as Rosa
- Rosa Costanzo as Nedda
- Rosario Galvagno as Don Salvatore
- Carmela Fichera as the Baroness
- Venera Bonaccorso as Laughing old woman

== Background ==
During the 1940s, Luchino Visconti used fiction to express his feelings about the Second World War and its effects on Italian society. Visconti's work combined a firm narrative structure with deep humanism. He wrote novels and plays but ended up deciding to channel his creative energies into theatrical productions and films. As Visconti built his reputation in the theater, the Communist Party commissioned him to make a documentary film about fishermen that was to be used as propaganda in the 1948 election campaign. Visconti took this opportunity to accomplish an old desire: adapting Giovanni Verga's I Malavoglia (1881 The House by the Medlar Tree) for the screen, having acquired the film rights in 1941.

Location of Aci Trezza in Sicily

He traveled to Aci Trezza in Sicily, where Verga's novel takes place, and found that it had hardly changed since the 1880s. Considering this, Visconti in neorealist fashion, decided to shoot the film in actual Sicilian locations and also to use local people as actors. Visconti believed these ordinary people could portray the truth about themselves better than actors assuming roles.

The film ended up different from either the idea of a documentary about fishermen or the adaptation of the novel I Malavoglia. Originally Visconti planned to shoot a trilogy, where the first part would tell about the fishermen and would have ended in defeat. The second part would tell about peasants and would have ended in a stalemate between exploiters and the exploited. Finally, the third part would be about miners, ending in a triumph of solidarity with the oppressed. The decision to shoot only the first part came about as the importance of the so-called "episode of the sea" increased in its association with Verga. Having realized this, Visconti decided to conclude it on a note of resigned defeat and not in a miraculous victory.

A large chapter of the book by Silvia Iannello Le immagini e le parole dei Malavoglia (Sovera, Roma, 2008) is devoted to the origins, comments, and some images taken from the immortal movie of Luchino Visconti.

The film is also often put in parallel with the shooting and development of Stromboli by Roberto Rossellini about its main actor's style and content.

=== Film style ===
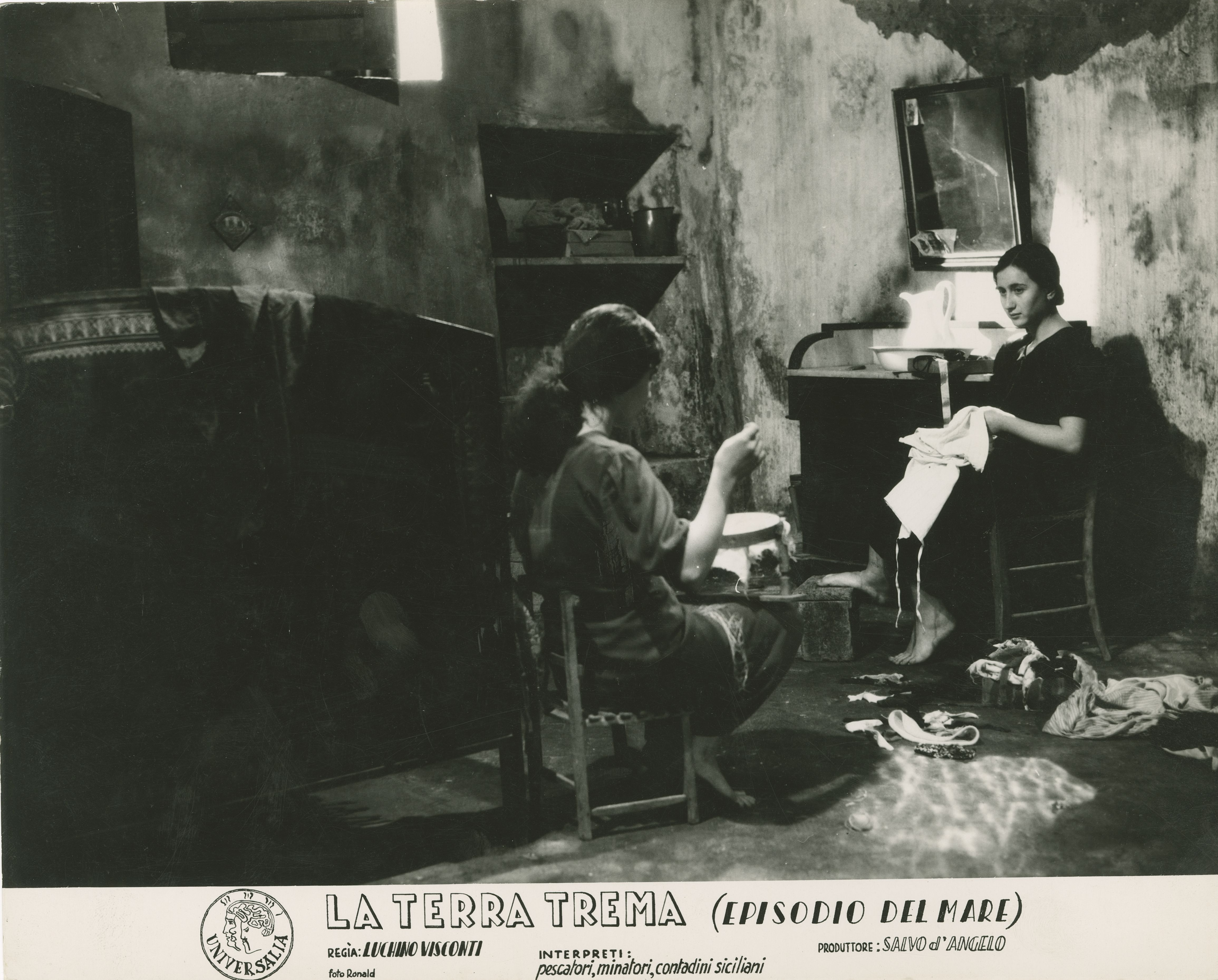
The sea episode

The use of fades and dissolves creates an almost solemn effect of time passing while people are engaged in everyday tasks. Long takes help to convey the feeling of tranquility that persists until the family's economic downfall. From then on, long takes are used to reveal lonely figures in desolate environments or people in confrontation with one another. Visconti keeps the spectator at a slight distance from the characters and events, and it is both an aesthetic and ethical choice, a gesture of respect for the life of the people of Aci Trezza.

The entire mood of the film becomes oppressive since the camera never leaves Aci Trezza, except in the scenes at sea at the beginning and end of the film. The outside world appears only indirectly when Ntoni goes to prison, when the family goes to sign a contract with the bank, when a stranger offering American cigarettes appears to tempt the youngsters to move to the mainland, and when the old baroness honors the inauguration of the wholesalers' new boats with her presence. Some allusions to modern Italian history are also present in the movie.

=== Music ===
Since 1941 Visconti had known that the most important aspect of his Verga adaptation would be his ideal of "internal and musical rhythm." With Willy Ferrero's help, he used some Sicilian folk music, but music is quite sparse in the film until we move towards the ending where it does increase, emphasizing the fate of the Valastros. Don Salvatore whistling tunes from operas, the poignant melodies played by Uncle Nunzio, the sounds of the wind and the sea, of ships returning to the harbor, cries from the streets, and the musicality of the Sicilian language create their archaic atmosphere.

=== Narration ===
After the film was completed, a voice-over commentary written by Antonio Pietrangeli had to be added, since no Italian was spoken by the participants. At the beginning of the film, he states that "...Italian is not a language of the poor." Also, the commentary takes an important narrative and thematic function. The poetic quality of the voice and the words are a part of the classical unity of the film, being a crucial part of its structure. Some examples include:

...It is just a matter of time, as the worm said to the stone, I'll bore a hole through you yet.

One by one, the tree's branches wither and fall.

If there's any relief, a moment's happiness, it's the thought of one's girl. And for her, one can do without sleep. Because a man's made to be caught by a girl, just as the fishes of the sea are made for those who catch them.

== Critical reception ==
La Terra Trema currently holds an 82% approval rating on Rotten Tomatoes. It received the International Prize at the 9th Venice International Film Festival in 1948, and was nominated for the Golden Lion.

== See also ==
- Docufiction
- List of docufiction films
