= Lupa =

Lupa may refer to:

== Places ==
- Lupa Ward Ward in Chunya, Mbeya, Tanzania
- Lupa Gold Field, in Chunya, Mbeya, Tanzania
- Lupa Island (Hungary)
- Lupa Zoo, Ludlow, Massachusetts, United States
- Mount Lupa, Antarctica

== Other ==
- Auguste Lupa, a fictional character in two pastiche novels by author John Lescroart
- Lupa (ship), an 18th-century Ottoman galley ship
- Lupa, the author of the book A Field Guide to Otherkin (2007)
- She-wolf (Roman mythology), an Italian wolf who nursed the twins Romulus and Remus

== See also ==
- La lupa (disambiguation)
- Lupae (disambiguation)
