= She-wolf =

A she-wolf is a female gray wolf (Canis lupus).

She-wolf or she wolf may also refer to:

== History ==
- She-wolf (Roman mythology), from the tale of Romulus and Remus, a traditional symbol of Rome
- Isabella of France (1295–1358), wife of Edward II popularly known as the "she-wolf"
- Margaret of Anjou (1430–1482), wife of Henry VI - called "She-wolf of France but worse" in Shakespeare's Henry VI

== Art ==
- She-Wolf of the Capitol, or Capitoline Wolf, a bronze sculpture inspired by the founding legend of Rome
- The She-Wolf, a 1943 post-surrealist painting by Jackson Pollock

== Books ==
- "The She-Wolf", a story by Saki from the 1914 book Beasts and Super-Beasts
- "La Lupa" (short story) ("The She-Wolf"), a short story by Giovanni Verga

== Film ==
- The She Wolf (1919 film), an American silent short western film
- The She-Wolf (1931 film), an American drama film
- The She-Wolf (1951 film), a Greek film
- La lupa (1953 film), also known as She-wolf, an Italian film by director Alberto Lattuada based on the short story by Giovanni Verga
- The She-Wolf (1965 film) (Spanish: La Loba), a Spanish-language film directed by Rafael Baledón
- Ilsa, She Wolf of the SS, a 1975 Nazisploitation film
- She-Wolf (1983 film), Polish film by Marek Piestrak
- La lupa (1996 film), also known as The She Wolf, an Italian film by Gabriele Lavia based on the short story by Giovanni Verga

== Television ==
- She Wolf: The Last Sentinel, a Philippine fantasy horror television series
- She-Wolf (TV series), a 1990s horror fiction television series

== Music ==
- She Wolf (album), a 2009 dance-pop album by Shakira
- "She Wolf" (Shakira song), the title track from the album
- "She Wolf (Falling to Pieces)", a single by David Guetta from the 2012 album Nothing but the Beat 2.0
- She-Wolf, a 1981 country blues album by Jessie Mae Hemphill
- "She-Wolf", a song by Megadeth from the 1997 album Cryptic Writings

== See also ==
- La lupa (disambiguation)
- Loba (disambiguation)
- Romulus and Remus
