= She-Wolves =

She-Wolves or She Wolves may refer to:

- She-Wolves: The Women Who Ruled England Before Elizabeth, 2010 book by Helen Castor
- She Wolves, 1925 film

== See also ==
- She wolf
