= Evil Senses =

- Directed by: Gabriele Lavia
- Screenplay by: Gianfranco Clerici; Gabriele Lavia; Vincenzo Mannino; Dardano Sacchetti
- Story by: Gabriele Lavia
- Produced by: Pietro Innocenz]
- Starring: Monica Guerritore; Gabriele Lavia
- Cinematography: Mario Vulpiani
- Edited by: Daniele Alabiso
- Music by: Fabio Frizzi
- Production companies: Globe Films; Dania Film; Filmes International; National Cinematografica
- Release date: 1986
- Country: Italy
- Language: English

Evil Senses (Italian: Sensi) is a 1986 Italian erotic thriller film written and directed by Gabriele Lavia and starring Monica Guerritore, Lavia, and Mimsy Farmer.

== Plot ==
Professional hitman Manuel come into possession of a compromising list of names that he should not know, which leads him to become hunted down by his bosses to be killed. Manuel takes refuge in Rome to a brothel run by his old mistress Micòl. He meets Vittoria, a mysterious and fascinating sex worker who leven though she claims to be already married. The two begin a sexual relationship, while Vittoria is actually under the payroll of Manuel's bosses, among them is her fake husband who has planned on having her seduce him to obtain the names on the list. Manuel confesses that he has thrown away her list of names, but that he keeps them in her memory. Vittoria is then ordered to kill Manuel, but then aims the gun at Manuel, but does not shoot him and only pretends to have carried out her bosses orders. Her bosses arrive in the room that was supposed to be the scene of the crime and are shot dead. Manuel then also kills Vittoria, realizing he is unable to reconcile that relationship with his own life as a fugitive.

== Cast ==
- Monica Guerritore as Vittoria
- Gabriele Lavia as Manuel
- Mimsy Farmer as Nicol
- Lewis E. Ciannelli as Vittoria's companion
- Dario Mazzoli
- Gioia Scola
- Jean Rene Masrevery

== Production ==
Film historian and critic Roberto Curti stated that Evil Senses was part of a small cycle of Italian erotic films that leaned towards being thrillers after the success of the Tinto Brass film The Key (1983). Evil Senses was entirely shot in Rome and shot in English.

The film continued the pairing of director Gabriele Lavia who also stars in the film and his wife Monica Guerritore from Scandalous Gilda.

== Release and reception ==
Evil Senses was released in 1986. In Germany, it was released on home video as Stripped to Die. In his book on Italian thrillers, Adrian Luther-Smith declared the film "an empty experience with few redeeming points" noting it being "painfully slow" and that "the sexual encounters are dull and even potentially perverse details, such as Victoria provocatively discarding her panties for her transfixed lover, are rendered unexciting due to the static presentation."

== See also ==
- List of Italian films of 1986
