= Aci Trezza =

Town in Sicily, Italy

Coordinates: 37°33′49″N 15°09′41″E

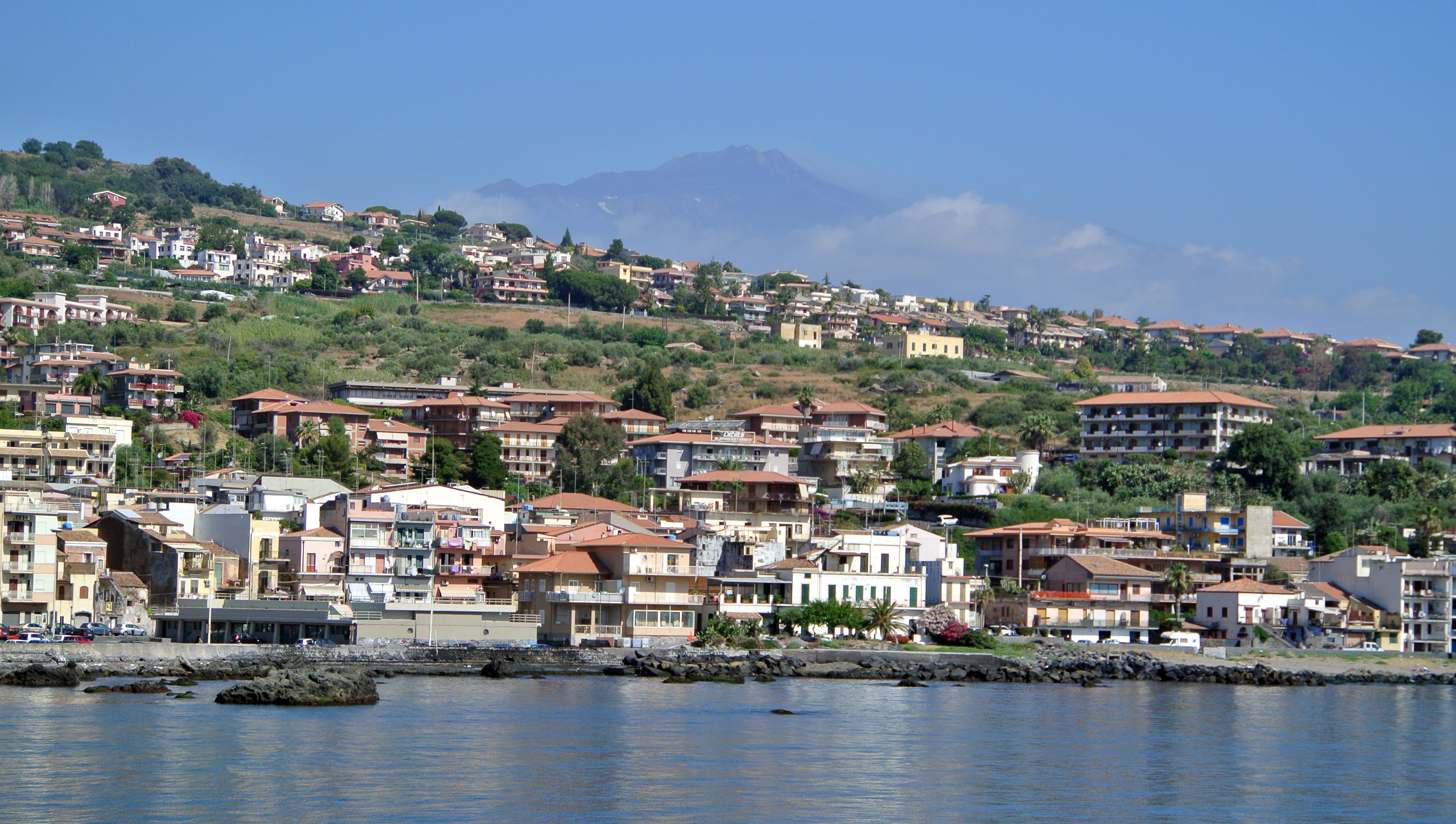
Aci Trezza with Mount Etna in the background

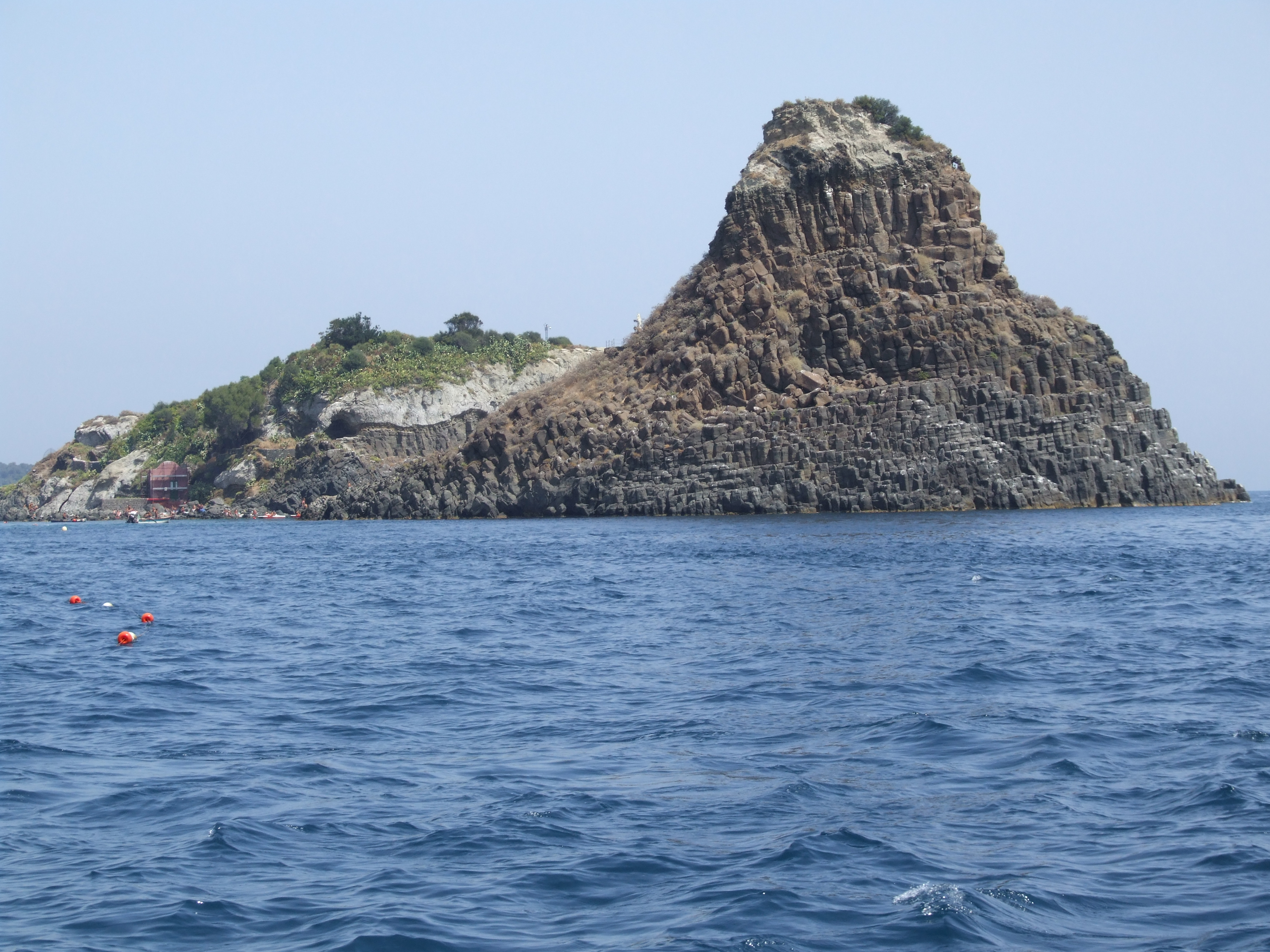
Lachea Island behind a Cyclopean Rock

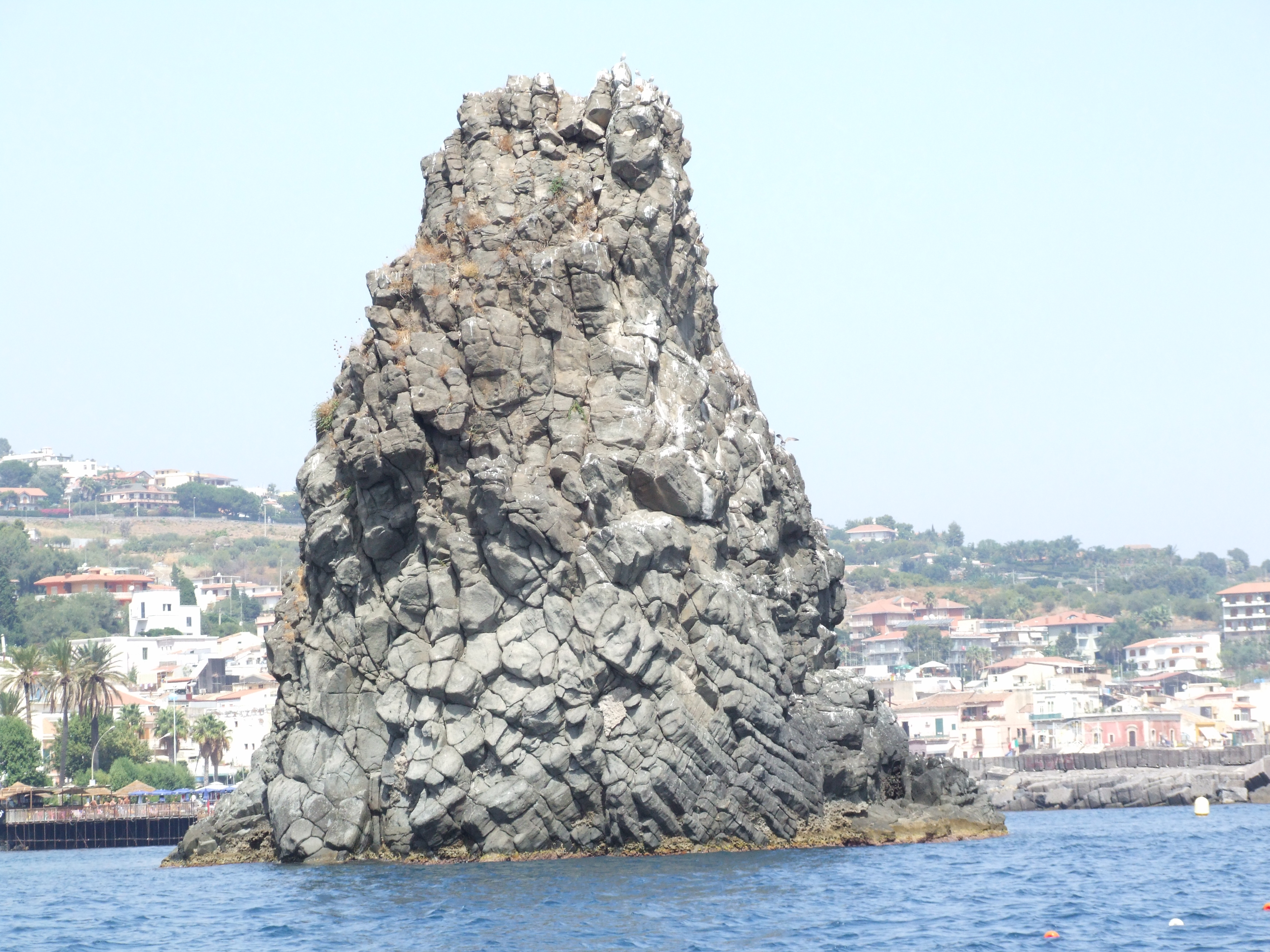
I faraglioni dei Ciclopi ("the cliffs of the Cyclops") at Aci Trezza

Aci Trezza (Sicilian: A Trizza) is a town in Sicily, southern Italy, a frazione of the comune of Aci Castello, c. 10 km north of Catania, with a population of around 5,000 people.

Located on the coast of the Ionian Sea, the village has a long history of maritime activity. Aci Trezza is a popular spot for Italian vacationers in the summer. The patron Saint of the town is St. John the Baptist. The Festa of San Giovanni is celebrated each year during the last week of June in his honor.

== The Islands of the Cyclops ==
Off the coast of Aci Trezza are three tall, prominent sea stacks. According to local legend, these were the great stones thrown at Odysseus in the Odyssey by the monster Cyclops. The islands are thus referred to as the "isole dei ciclopi" (islands of the Cyclops, or Cyclopean Isles) by locals. This complements the notion that the Cyclops once had a smithy below Mount Etna, which looms over the village to the northwest.

== Cultural references ==
Giovanni Verga's novels I Malavoglia ("The House by the Medlar Tree"), and Fantasticheria are set in Aci Trezza.

In 1948 Luchino Visconti filmed his neo-realist film La Terra Trema, based on Verga's novel I Malavoglia, in Aci Trezza. The entire cast were local inhabitants rather than professional actors. A small museum dedicated to the film can be found in the town, and is run by one of the cast members.

== Notes and references ==
- Casalaina, Concettina (1929). Acitrezza. Breve studio monografico. Catania: Tip. Ingrassia.

Specific
