= Rosso Malpelo =

Italian novel written by Giovanni Verga

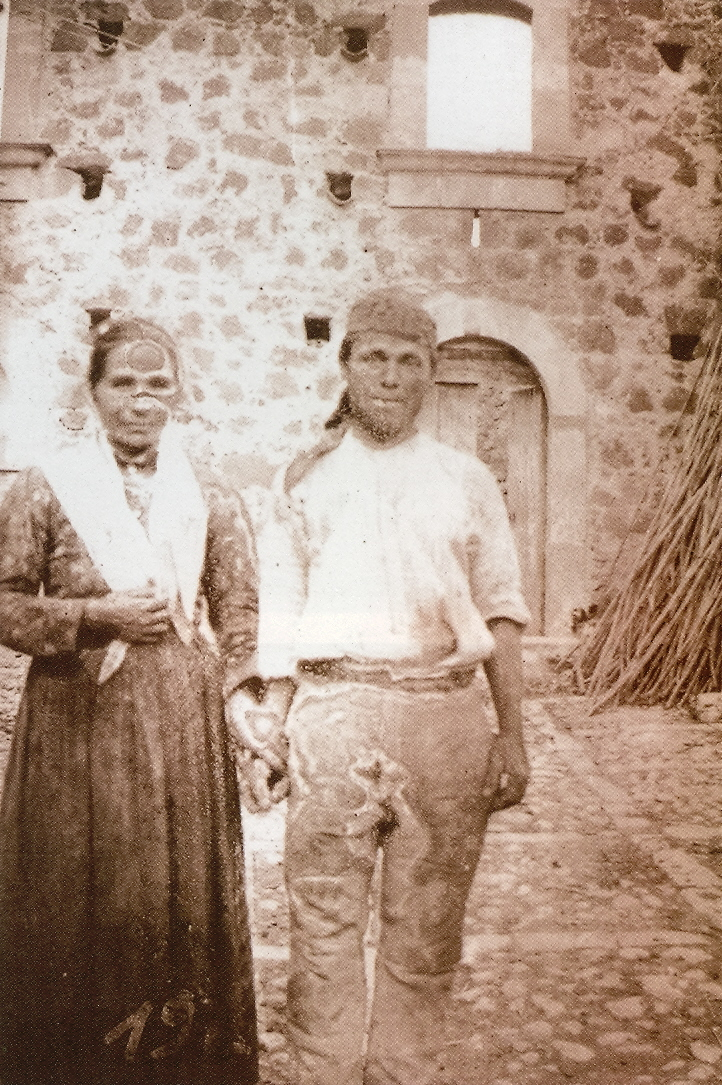
Photo taken by Verga of a Sicilian couple who worked his property in 1897.

"Rosso Malpelo" is a short story by Giovanni Verga. The title "Rosso Malpelo" is Italian for "evil redhead", a nickname which combines Rosso (red) with Malpelo (evil hair), as Sicilians believed people with red hair were malicious and had an evil disposition. The story, written in 1878, is set in Verga's native Sicily and reflects the social and economic conditions endured by the poor working classes in Southern Italy at the time. The story is a fine example of Italian Realism or Verismo, and is written in Verga's concise, impersonal and distinctly Sicilian style, manipulating the narrative voice into something more akin to the oral tradition. His subject matter and scientific style has led to comparison to Émile Zola's more widely known book, Germinal.

This short story appeared for the first time on Il fanfulla, an Italian journal, in 1878, and was later published in 1880 in a collection of other works by Verga, from his 1879–1880s "Vita dei Campi". The novella is widely known and appreciated in Italy, providing an interesting quasi-historical documentation of the condition of the South following the unification of Italy. The book was adapted into a film in 2007, with a title of Little Boy Red.

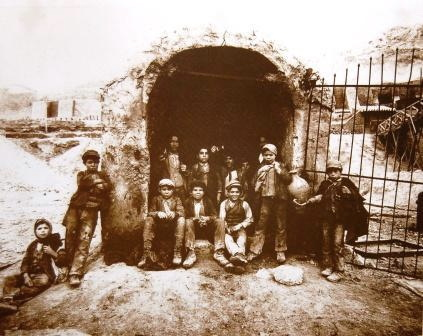
Sicily: Carusi (child workers) at the mouth of a sulphur mine shaft in (1899).

== Key characters ==
- Rosso Malpelo
- Misciu
- The pit owner
- Ranocchio

== Plot ==
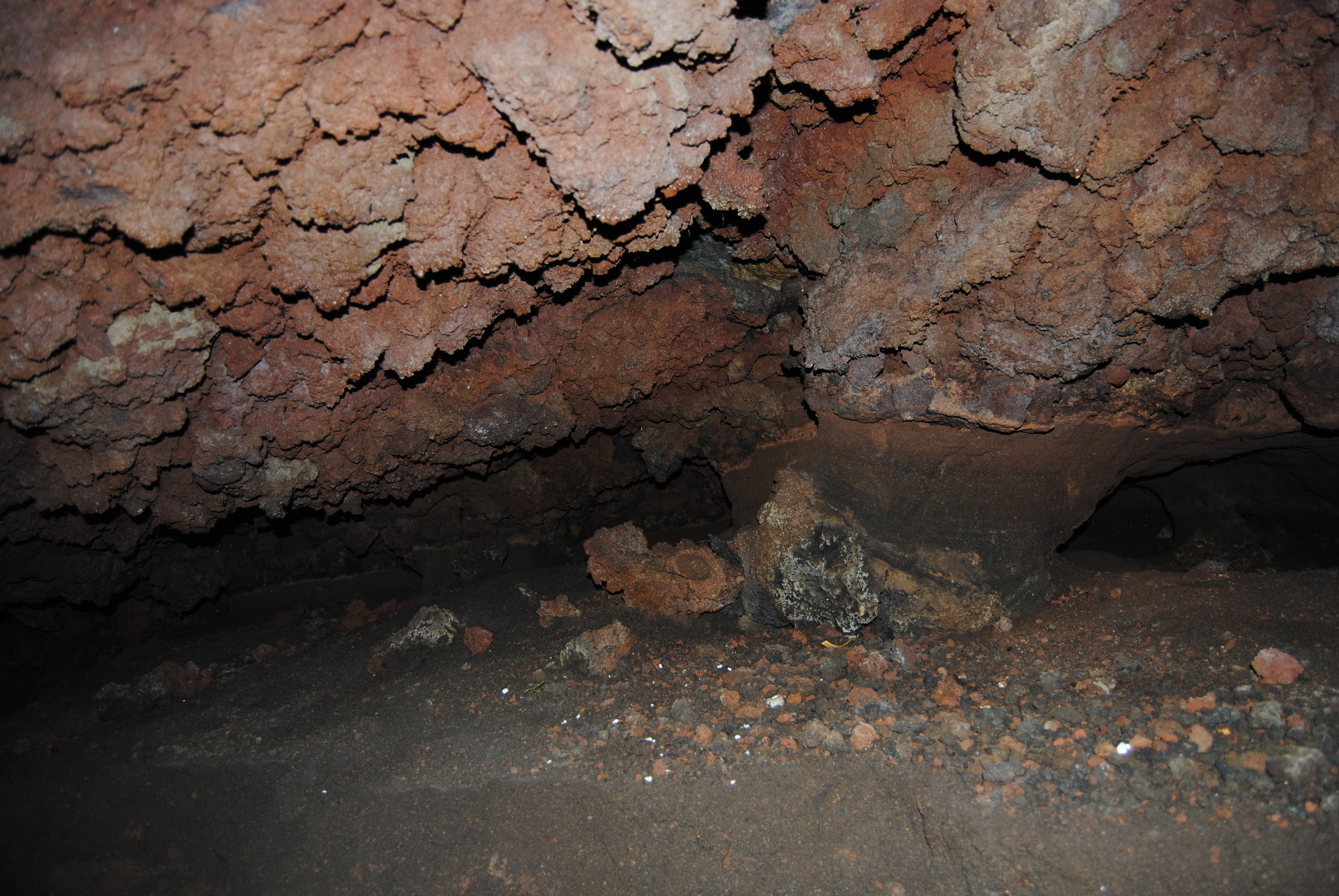
A sand mine in Mascalucia, Sicily.

Rosso Malpelo, a mischievous red-haired youth, is routinely beaten and picked upon for his assumed nastiness, as manifest in his red hair. He works in the sand mine with his father, Misciu, who is killed by a collapse whilst removing a support on request from the pit owner. Malpelo is deeply affected by the loss of his father as he was the only person looking out for him against a torrent of abuse from other workers in the mine. After two days however, he has to return to the mine. Vulnerable, Malpelo begins to develop contorted philosophies of life surrounding his experiences. He takes to beating one of the pit donkeys and taking revenge on those weaker than him, thus worsening his reputation to such an extent that he is blamed for every misfortune. Malpelo accepts the subsequent beatings without question. One day a new boy starts in the mine. A former bricklayer's labourer, he is no longer able to work above ground having fallen from a bridge. He subsequently walks with a limp and is known in the mine as Ranocchio, or frog. Malpelo takes Ranocchio under his wing, giving him a share of his food seemingly for protection and the right to beat him himself, in order, in Malpelo's eyes, to toughen him up. Malpelo continues to be beaten, and is no longer welcome at home, apart from when he is delivering his pay. He is depicted as becoming more savage as he laments being born into the mine. Soon Misciu's corpse is found. At this point, Malpelo takes a morbid interest in using his father's tools and wearing his clothes. He also cryptically denounces the existence of a heaven. Not long after, Ranocchio is taken ill and dies. Malpelo is left without anyone who cares for him, and finally, when asked to undertake a particularly dangerous piece of work, he resigns himself to his fate. He walks into the mine, never to be seen again. His name becomes a legend amongst the miners, who fear that some day he will emerge from the mine with his "red hair and grey, evil eyes".

== Significance ==
In dealing with the working poor in Italy, Verga was exposing the continued backwardness of the South in Unified Italy. Indeed, at this time eminent politicians were largely Northern and were not prepared to reform the institutions of the South; the Prime Minister at the time, Agostino Depretis, was from Lombardy. Equally, the book can be read as an early piece of social theory or research, assessing that the social problems suffered by many in these poor communities were a consequence of their environment.

== See also ==
- Verismo
- I Malavoglia
- Émile Zola
- Germinal
