= Loba =

Loba or La Loba (she-wolf in Spanish) may refer to:

== Music ==
- Loba, the Spanish-language version of the album She Wolf by Shakira
- La Loba, a 2010 Spanish-language album and the title track by Ivonne Montero

== Film and television ==
- The She-Wolf (1965 film), originally released as La Loba
- La Loba (telenovela), a 2010 Mexican telenovela

== Other uses ==
- "Loba", a book length poem by feminist Beat icon Diane di Prima
- Loba (card game), a South American card game
- Loba, a genre of Pashto music
- Loba, a gram panchayat of Dubrajpur, West Bengal, India
- Loba, sparring in the Kashmiri martial art of Sqay
- Loba, a playable character in a battle royale game Apex Legends

== See also ==
- Lhoba, an Asian ethnic grouping
- She-wolf (disambiguation)
