= Castello Normanno (Aci Castello) =

Castle in Aci Castello, Catania, Sicily, Italy

- Aci Castello, Province of Catania in Italy
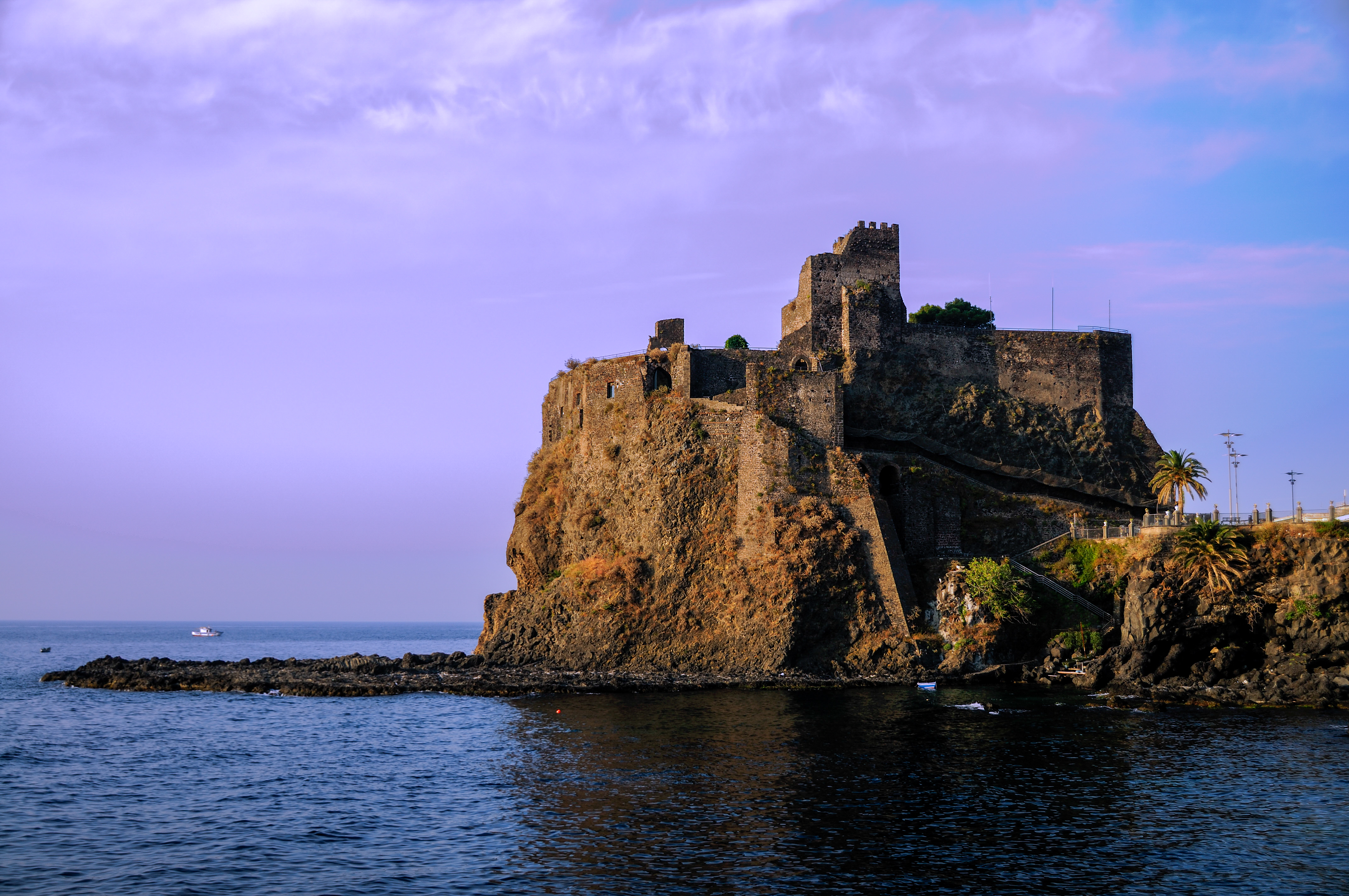
- View of the castle from the north

Site information
- Type: Castle
- Open to the public: Museum
- Condition: Ruined

Location
- Location in Sicily Castello Normanno (Europe)
- Coordinates: 37.5542°N 15.1493°E

Site history
- Built: 1169

The Castello Normanno ("Norman Castle"), or alternatively the Castello di Aci ("Castle of Aci"; Sicilian: Casteddu di Iaci), is a castle in Aci Castello in the Metropolitan City of Catania in Sicily, southern Italy. The castle is situated on a rocky outcrop jutting out into the sea. Its precise date of construction is uncertain, but it was important to the development of its region during the Middle Ages. During the War of the Sicilian Vespers, it was under the ownership of Roger of Lauria. It was besieged more than once, and was briefly controlled by the Spanish. It is currently a museum.

== History ==
The town of Aci Castello developed around the castle, which was built in 1076 by the Normans upon the foundations of a 7th-century Byzantine fortification. In 1169, Aci Castello started to expand after an eruption of Mount Etna made the towns in its vicinity uninhabitable. The castle later became the property of the Bishops of Catania.

In 1296, Roger of Lauria, admiral of the Aragonese fleet during the War of the Sicilian Vespers, was granted the fief of Aci and its castle as a reward for his faithful service to King Frederick III of Sicily. When relations between the two men soured and di Lauria transferred his loyalties to the Angevins, the castle was besieged and captured by King Frederick and di Lauria stripped of his fiefs. In 1320, the castle and Aci were taken from Roger's daughter, Margaret of Lauria and given to Blasco II de Alagona. Whilst the latter was away defending Palermo from the attacking Angevins, Bertrando di Balzo sacked Aci in his absence.

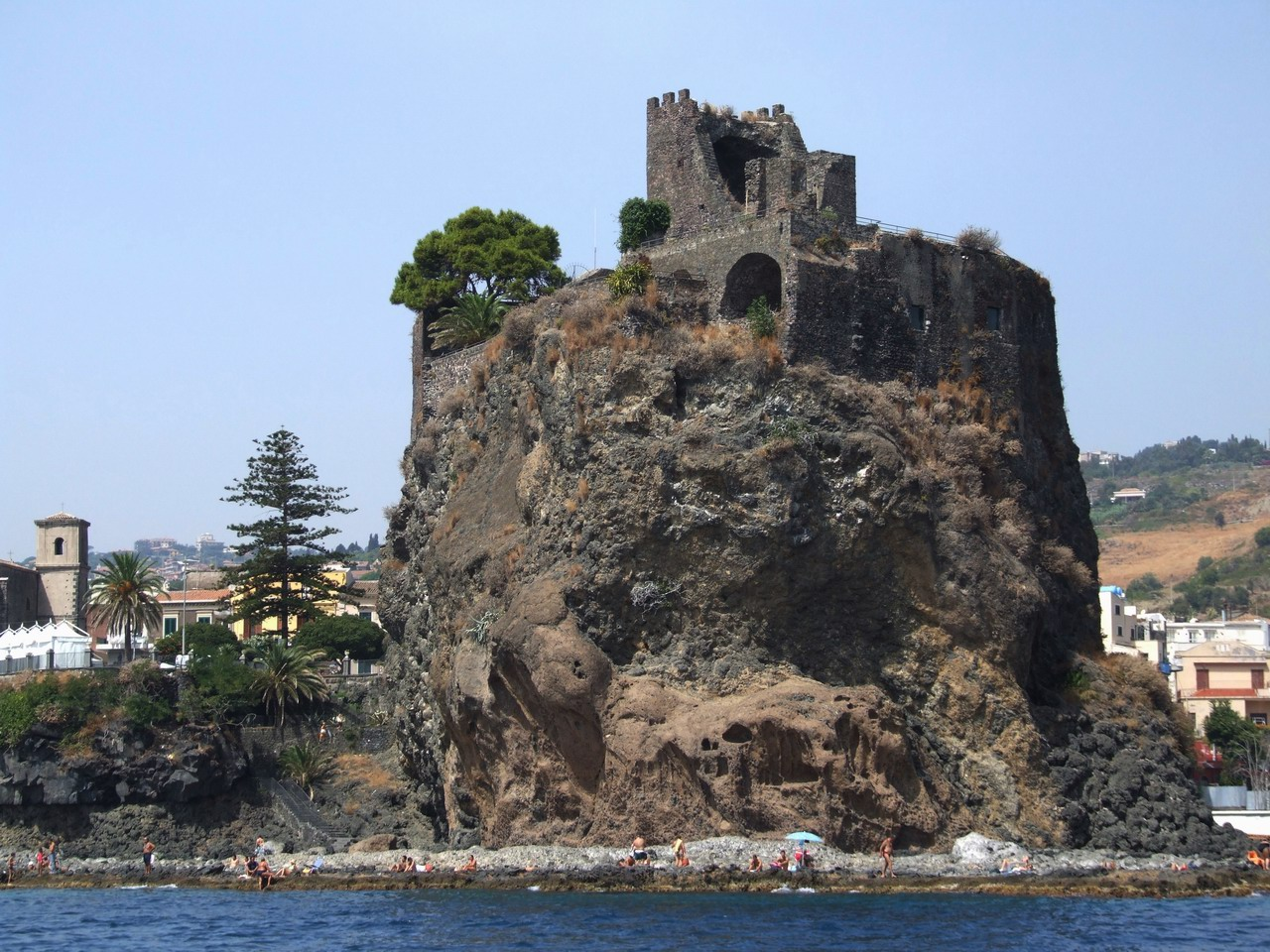
View of the castle from the eastern, seaward side

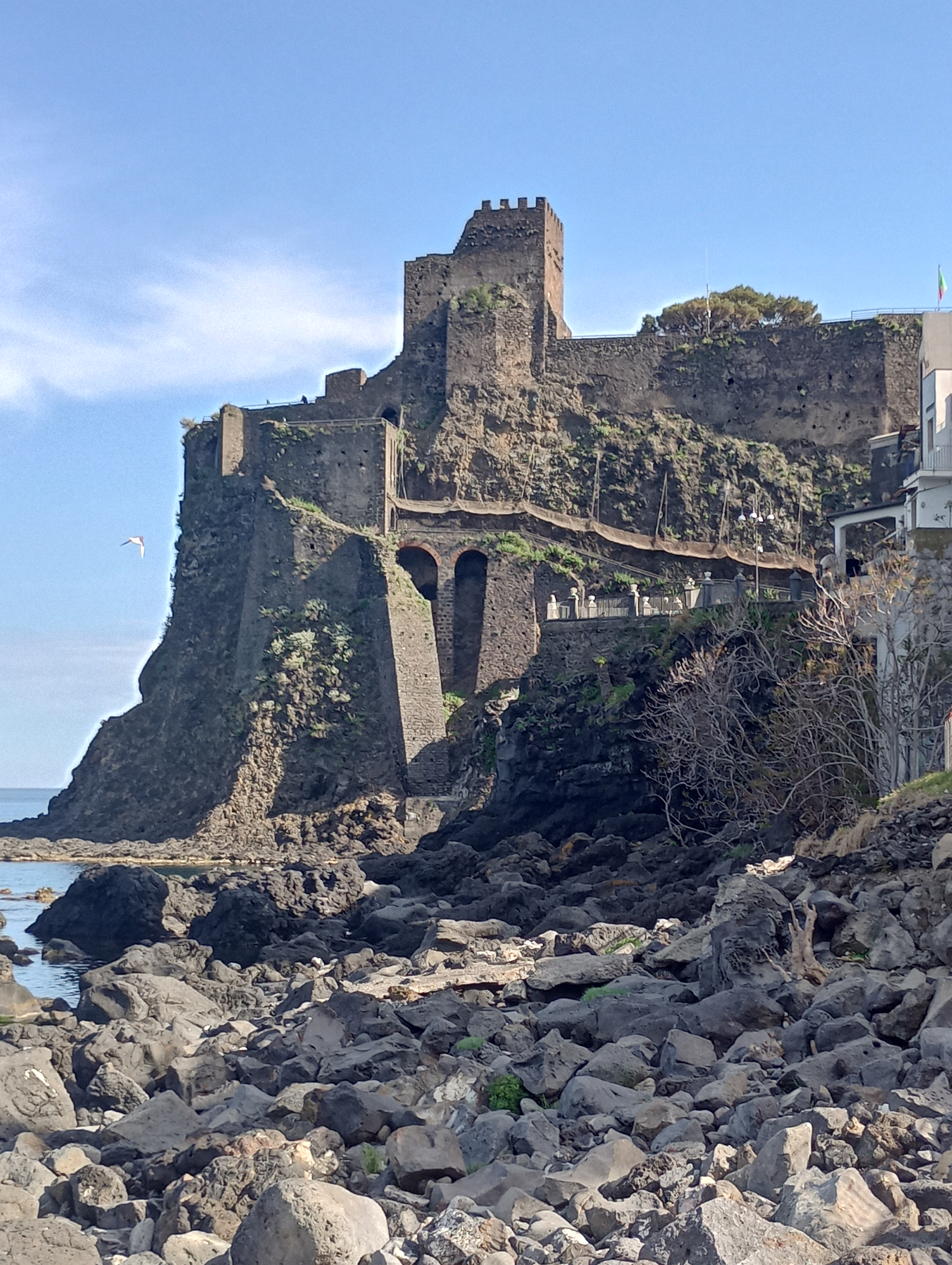
The castle and its entrance viewed from the rocks

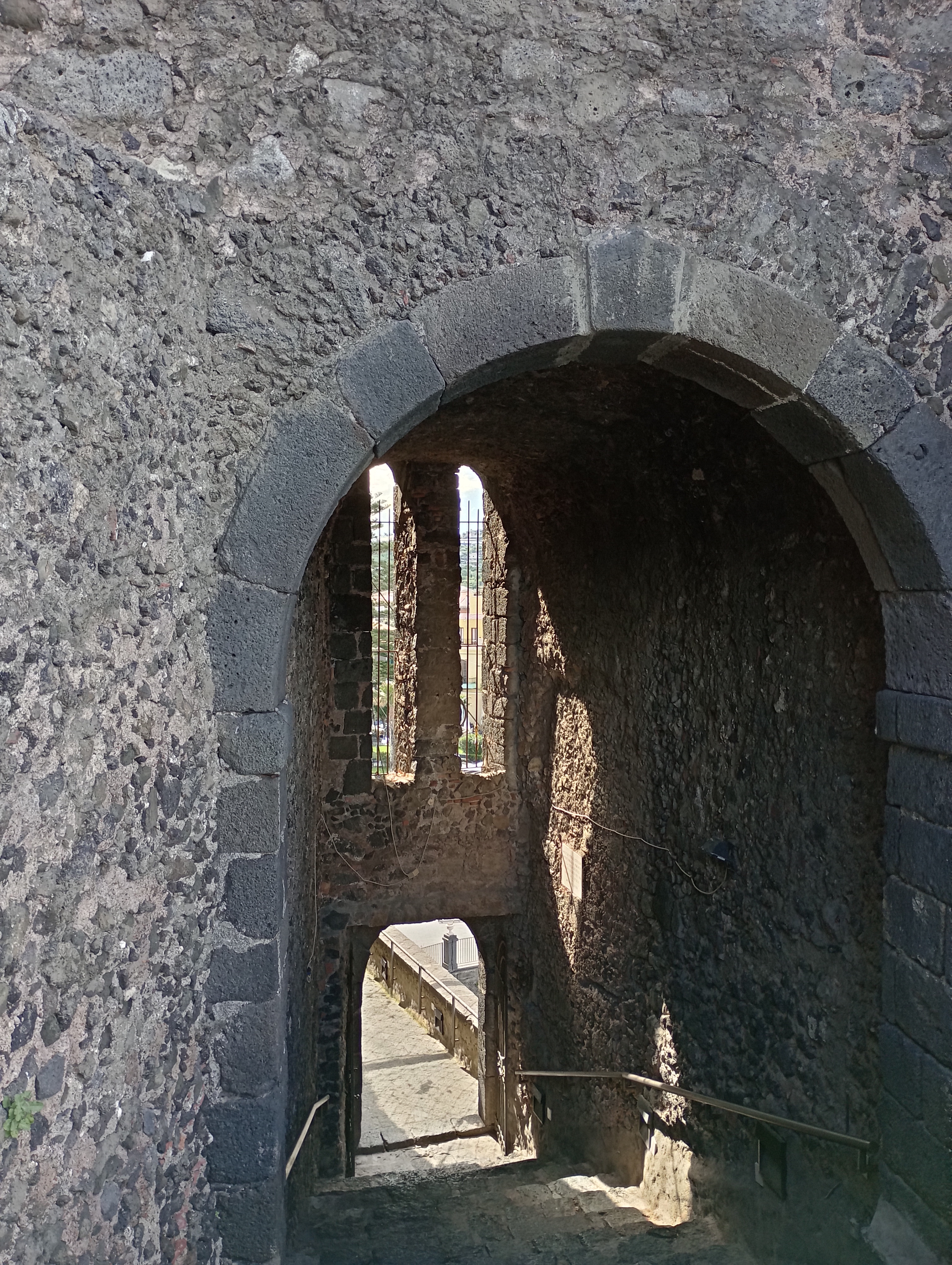
Castle interior

== See also ==
- List of castles in Italy
- Castello Ursino - a Castle in nearby Catania
