= Mastro-don Gesualdo =

1889 novel by Giovanni Verga

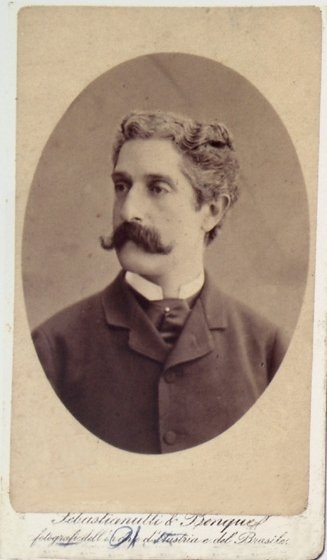
- Photographic portrait of Giovanni Verga
- Author: Giovanni Verga
- Original title: Mastro-don Gesualdo
- Translator: Mary A. Craig
- Language: Italian
- Publication date: 1889
- Publication place: Italy
- English publication date: 1893
- Original text: Mastro-don Gesualdo at Italian Wikisource

Mastro-don Gesualdo is an Italian novel written by Giovanni Verga, published in 1889. The first English edition, Master Don Gesualdo (1893), was translated by Mary A. Craig and was published in London by J. P. Osgood, McIlvaine publishers. Giovanni Cecchetti, in the introduction to his translation of the 1979 edition, writes that it "is generally regarded as a masterpiece".

== Background ==
This work belongs to the Ciclo dei vinti, together with I Malavoglia, La Duchessa di Leyra, L'Onorevole Scipioni and L'uomo di lusso, works which deal with the problem of social and economical advancement. La Duchessa de Leyra remained only a draft, while the last two novels planned for the Ciclo, L'Onorevole Scipioni and L'Uomo di Lusso, were not even started.

The novel was first published in instalments in the literary magazine Nuova Antologia. The definitive edition, incorporating significant linguistic and structural changes, was published in 1889. It is divided into four parts, each of which is made up of several chapters.

== Plot ==
Gesualdo Motta, the protagonist of the novel, is a poor bricklayer from Vizzini living in the years immediately following the Italian unification. At an early age he swore that he would make himself rich and eventually, by dint of ruthless egoism and untiring energy, he becomes a contractor and then a wealthy and powerful landowner. “Mastro-don” means worker-gentleman.

Gesualdo has one raison d'être – to work to increase his personal fortune. He has risen from the ranks and is now striving to attain the highest ranks of his financial and social world and to keep himself firmly entrenched there. Never shedding his straightforward, crude approach to life, he seeks to become part of the ruling class by marrying the frail Bianca Trao, who belongs to the most aristocratic (but also the poorest) family in town.

The marriage, however, is a pitiful mismatching of class, style, and temperament – a sad parody of the differences in birth and education between Mastro-don Gesualdo, the nearly illiterate mason, and the delicate noblewoman he has wed. Gesualdo finds out that he is loathed not only by the society into which he has moved but also by the one he has abandoned.

Gesualdo urges his daughter Isabella, who is passionately in love with an impoverished man, to marry the elderly duke of Leyra. She plays her new role as a duchess with a vengeance and consumes her father's fortune, She becomes distant and hostile toward him, as well as superior in a "you asked for it" manner.

Don Gesualdo, grieved by the amount of money squandered in his mansion and begrudged to his land that, like him, is being scorned and neglected, awaits his death, relegated to a secluded room. He dies alone, hardly tolerated, and is finally abandoned by all.

Don Gesualdo was thinking how much good money must be slipping away; all that eating and drinking at his daughter's expense, devouring the dowry he had given her, the rich land he had brooded over for so long, night and day, and had measured out in his sleep, and won at last acre by acre, day by day, denying himself the very bread from his mouth; the house, everything, everything, everything would slip through their hands. Who would be there to defend his property after his death? – his poor possessions!

— Cecchetti trans., p. 315.

== Legacy ==
Mastro-don Gesualdo was translated into English by D. H. Lawrence in 1925–28. Lawrence's translation was published by Dedalus European Classics, first in 1984, then with a new edition in 2000.

D. H. Lawrence also wrote an introduction to Mastro-don Gesualdo, published in Phoenix II. Lawrence also wrote an essay on Mastro-don Gesualdo, published in Phoenix and in Selected Literary Criticism.

== Bibliography ==
- McWilliam, G. H. (1961). "Verga and 'verismo'". Hermathena. 95: 3–20. JSTOR 23040137.
