= Scandalous Gilda =

- Directed by: Gabriele Lavia
- Written by: Gabriele Lavia; Riccardo Ghione
- Produced by: Pietro Innocenzi
- Starring: Monica Guerritore; Gabriele Lavia
- Cinematography: Mario Vulpiani
- Edited by: Daniele Alabiso
- Music by: Giorgio Carnini
- Release date: 1985
- Language: Italian

Scandalous Gilda (Italian: Scandalosa Gilda) is a 1985 Italian erotic drama film written and directed by Gabriele Lavia and starring Monica Guerritore and the same Lavia.

== Cast ==
- Monica Guerritore as The Woman
- Gabriele Lavia as The Man
- Pina Cei as The Housekeeper
- Italo Gasperini
- Dario Mazzoli
- Jasmine Maimone

== See also ==
- List of Italian films of 1985
