= Monica Guerritore =

Italian actress (born 1958)

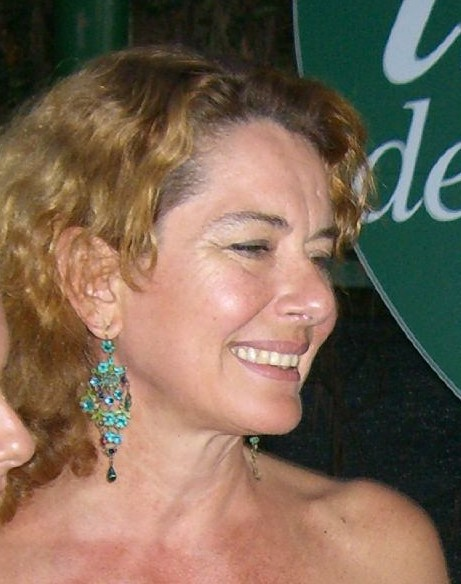
- Guerritore in 2013
- Born: 5 January 1958 (age 68); Rome, Italy
- Occupations: Actress; director
- Years active: 1973–present
- Partner(s): Gabriele Lavia (1981–2001); Roberto Zaccaria (since 2001)
- Website: monicaguerritore.it

Monica Guerritore (born 5 January 1958) is an Italian film, theatre, and television actress.

== Biography ==
Guerritore was born in Rome to a Neapolitan father and a Calabrian mother. She had her first small part in Vittorio De Sica's Una breve vacanza, at the early age of 13. After her official debut at just sixteen years of age under the direction of Giorgio Strehler in The Cherry Orchard, she tied herself romantically and artistically to film and theatre director Gabriele Lavia, acting in his theatrical performances mostly strong female characters like Jocasta, Lady Macbeth and Ophelia. Miss Julie in Strindberg's drama. The couple separated in 2001, during the rehearsals of Ingmar Bergman's Scenes from a Marriage in which she played Marianne. Guerritore continued her work with other directors, like Giancarlo Sepe, in Madame Bovary, Carmen, and The Lady of the Camellias.

Beside the stage career, Guerritore works on television and film, starting in 1976 along Marcello Mastroianni in Signore e signori, buonanotte. In 1977, she plays the title role in first RAI colour TV play Manon Lescaut; significant performances were in Salvatore Samperi's The Dark Side of Love (1985) and in Mauro Bolognini's The Venetian Woman (1986). She stayed far away from television for 17 years and came back on screen RAI in 1997 with the title role in Costanza, and in 1999 in Mario Caiano's L'amore oltre la vita. In 2004, she played Ambra Leonardi in Amanti e segreti, and in 2006 she played Ada Sereni in Gianluigi Calderone's Exodus.

Lavia directed her in many movies, often erotically toned, including Scandalous Gilda (1985), Evil Senses (1986) and a Sicilian film by Giovanni Verga, La lupa (1996). In theatre, she also wrote and directed Giovanna d'Arco (2004–2006), and Dall'Inferno all'Infinito (2008). In 2007, she played a part in Ferzan Özpetek's A Perfect Day (Un giorno perfetto), and in 2008 she took part to Ivano De Matteo's La bella gente. She has performed Saint Monica in Christian Duguay's Sant'Agostino.

Guerritore portrayed Anna Di Gastoni in the 2018 film My Big Gay Italian Wedding. In 2024, she starred as Gabriella de Rosa in the Netflix Italian series Deceitful Love. Guerritore's first feature film as a director, Anna, about Anna Magnani premiered at the Rome Film Festival on 9 October 2025, and was released in Italy on 6 November 2025.

== Filmography ==
=== Films ===
Year	Title	Role	Notes
1973	A Brief Vacation	Maria	
1974	Lovers and Other Relatives	Rosy	
1975	The First Time on the Grass	Lotte	
1976	Goodnight, Ladies and Gentlemen	Paolo's assistant	Cameo appearance
1977	Stato interessante	Annabella	Segment: "Secondo episodio"
1977	Man in a Hurry	Marie de Bois-Rosé	
1978	Break Up	Silvia	
1979	Together?	Giulia	
1980	Men or Not Men	Bertha	
1980	Ombre	Monica	
1981	Forest of Love	Agnolella	
1982	Più bello di così si muore	Amelia	
1982	Io con te non ci sto più	Clara	
1983	Principe di Homburg	Natalia	
1984	The Dark Side of Love	Patrizia Viani	
1985	Scandalous Gilda	Gilda	
1986	The Venetian Woman	Valeria	
1986	Evil Senses	Vittoria	
1988	The Strangeness of Life	Anna	
1992	Crazy Underwear	Amalia	
1996	La lupa	Gnà Pina "La Lupa"	
1998	Femmina	Silvia	
2000	Scene da un matrimonio	Marianne	
2007	Liberarsi - Figli di una rivoluzione minore	Teresa	
2008	Sandrine in the Rain	Carolina	
2008	A Perfect Day	Mara Solari	
2008	La fabbrica dei tedeschi	Mother	
2008	The Seed of Discord	Andrologist	Cameo appearance
2009	La bella gente	Susanna	
2011	The Worst Week of My Life	Clara	
2012	Tell No One	Aurora	
2018	My Big Gay Italian Wedding		
2019	Tuttapposto		
2020	Agony	Angelica	
2022	Femminile singolare	Simona	
2023	Girasoli	Marie D'Amico	
2025	Anna	Anna Magnani	

=== Television ===
Year	Title	Role	Notes
1980	La tela del ragno	Clarissa Hailsham-Brown	Television film
1989	Gioco senza fine	Silvia	Television film
1996	Uno di noi	Monica	Episode: "Una madre indegna"
1998	Costanza	Costanza	Television film
1999	L'amore oltre la vita	Franca	Television film
2004–2005	Amanti e Segreti	Ambra Castelli	Main role
2007	Exodus - Il sogno di Ada	Ada Sereni	Television film
2007	Fuga con Marlene	Marlene	Television film
2010	Restless Heart: The Confessions of Saint Augustine	Saint Monica	Television film
2011	Rossella	Olimpia	Main role (season 1)
2012	Sabato, domenica e lunedì	Rosa Priore	Television film
2013	Trilussa - Storia d'amore e di poesia	Rosa Tomei	Television film
2015–2016	Thou Shalt Not Kill	Lucia Ferro	Main role
2021	Speravo de morì prima	Fiorella Totti	2 episodes
2021–2025	Vita da Carlo	Sandra	Main role
2023	The Good Mothers	Dalia	2 episodes
2024	Deceitful Love	Gabriella De Rosa	Main role
