= The Venetian Woman =

- Directed by: Mauro Bolognini
- Cinematography: Giuseppe Lanci
- Music by: Ennio Morricone
- Release date: 1986
- Language: Italian

La venexiana (internationally released as The Venetian Woman) is a 1986 Italian erotic film directed by Mauro Bolognini. The film is a transposition of the anonymous 16th century comedy play La Venexiana.

== Cast ==
- Laura Antonelli as Angela
- Monica Guerritore as Valeria
- Jason Connery as Jules
- Clelia Rondinella as Nena
- Claudio Amendola as Bernardo
- Annie Belle
