= Sporting Club Pallanuoto Acicastello =

S.C. Pallanuoto Acicastello
| Founded | 1958 (joined FIN in 1964) |
| Full Name | Sporting Club Pallanuoto Acicastello |
| President | Giovanni Di Grazia |
| Head coach | Sergio Cannavò |
| Website | www.pallanuotoacicastello.it |

S.C. Pallanuoto Acicastello is an Italian water polo club from Acicastello, Sicily. The club was founded in 1958, but joined FIN in 1964. Between 1964 and 1974, the club has spent much of its history in Promozione (the Italian fifth tier). In 1975 the team was promoted to Serie C (fourth tier) and was relegated in 1991. At the end of 1997-1998 season the Castellesi came back to Serie C. The following season it ended in third place. After the second place in the 1999-2000 season, the club was admitted in Serie B. Acicastello won the Serie B in 2005 and promoted to Serie A2. The team was relegated in 2008, however it was re-admitted to the Italian second tier.
