= Aci Castello =

Aci Castello Jaci Casteḍḍu (Sicilian)
- Comune
- Comune di Aci Castello
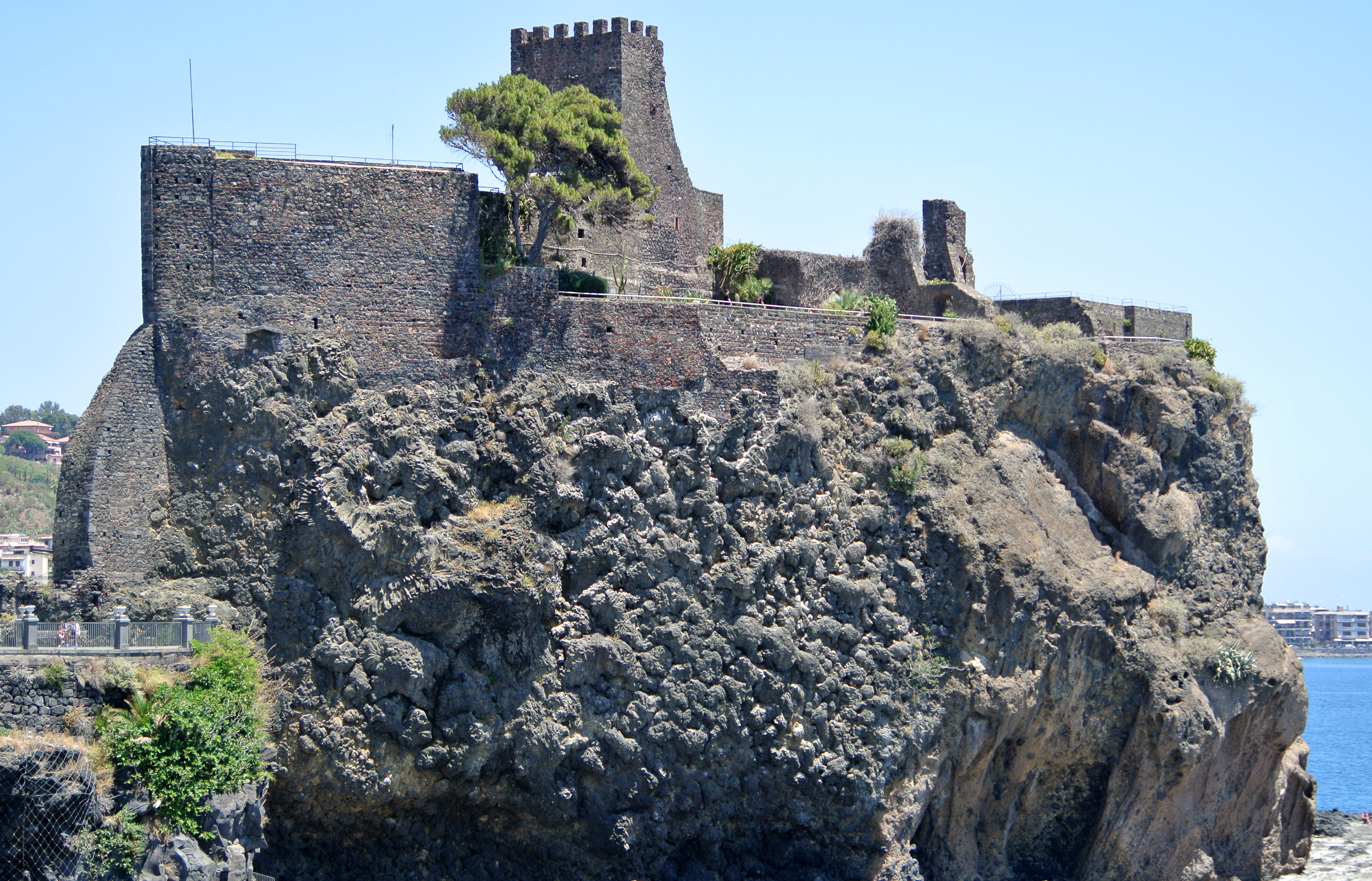
- The Castello Normanno at Aci Castello

- Coat of arms

- Location within Italy Location within Sicily
- Coordinates: 37°33′20″N 15°08′45″E
- Country: Italy
- Region: Sicily
- Metropolitan city: Catania (CT)
- Frazioni: Aci Trezza, Ficarazzi, Cannizzaro

Government
  - Mayor: Carmelo Scandurra

Area
  - Total: 8 km^{2} (3.1 sq mi)
- Elevation: 15 m (49 ft)

Population (30 April 2017)
  - Total: 18,614
  - Density: 2,300/km^{2} (6,000/sq mi)
- Demonym: Castellesi
- Time zone: UTC+1 (CET)
  - Summer (DST): UTC+2 (CEST)
- Postal code: 95021
- Dialing code: 095
- Patron saint: Saint Maurus Abbot
- Saint day: 15 January
- Website: www.comune.acicastello.ct.it

Aci Castello (Sicilian: Jaci Casteḍḍu) is a comune in the Metropolitan City of Catania in Sicily, Italy. Located 9 kilometres (6 mi) north of Catania on the Mediterranean coast, the city's primary economic sectors are agriculture and industry (in Catania). The city is surrounded by Aci Catena, Acireale, Catania, San Gregorio di Catania and Valverde.

== History ==
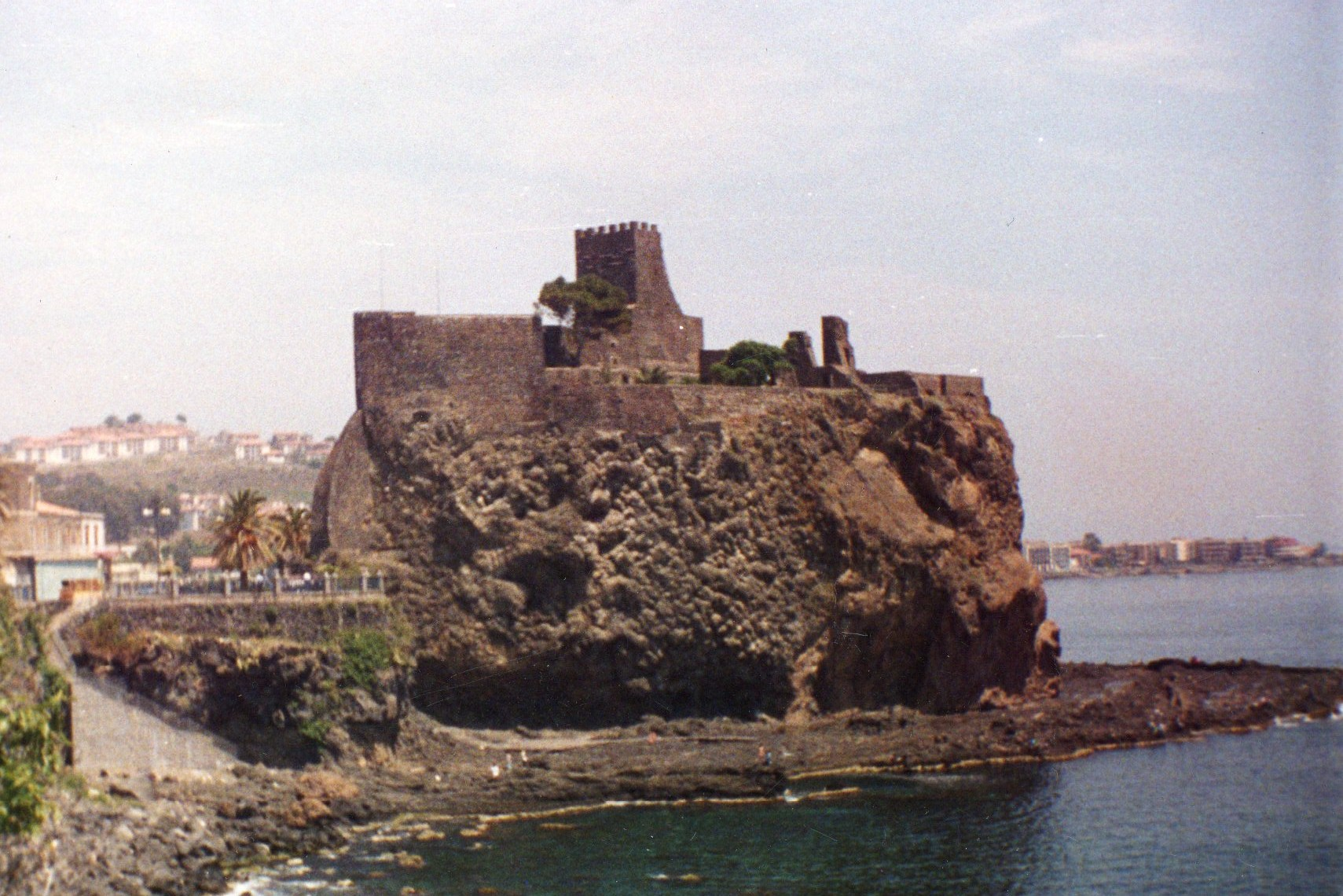
Panoramic view of the Norman Castle of Aci Castello in 1990.

The town of Aci Castello developed around the castle, built in 1076 by the Normans on the foundations of a 7th-century Byzantine fortification. Following the 1169 eruption of Mount Etna, which rendered nearby towns uninhabitable, Aci Castello started to expand. The castle later became the property of the bishops of Catania.

In 1296, Roger of Lauria, admiral of the Aragonese fleet during the War of the Sicilian Vespers, was granted the fief of Aci and its castle as a reward for his faithful service to King Frederick III of Sicily. When relations between the two men soured and di Lauria transferred his loyalties to the Angevins, the castle was besieged and captured by King Frederick and di Lauria stripped of his fiefs. In 1320, the castle and Aci were taken from Roger's descendant, Margaret of Lauria and given to Blasco II de Alagona. Whilst the latter was away defending Palermo from the attacking Angevins, Bertrando di Balzo sacked Aci in his absence.

== Main sights ==
- The Norman Castle, built from 1076 to 1081. It now serves as a museum.
- The borough Aci Trezza with a beach
- Church of St. Joseph (18th century)
- Greek Necropolis

== Sports ==
- Sporting Club Pallanuoto Acicastello
