= La Lupa (short story) =

Short story by Giovanni Verga

- Short story by Giovanni Verga
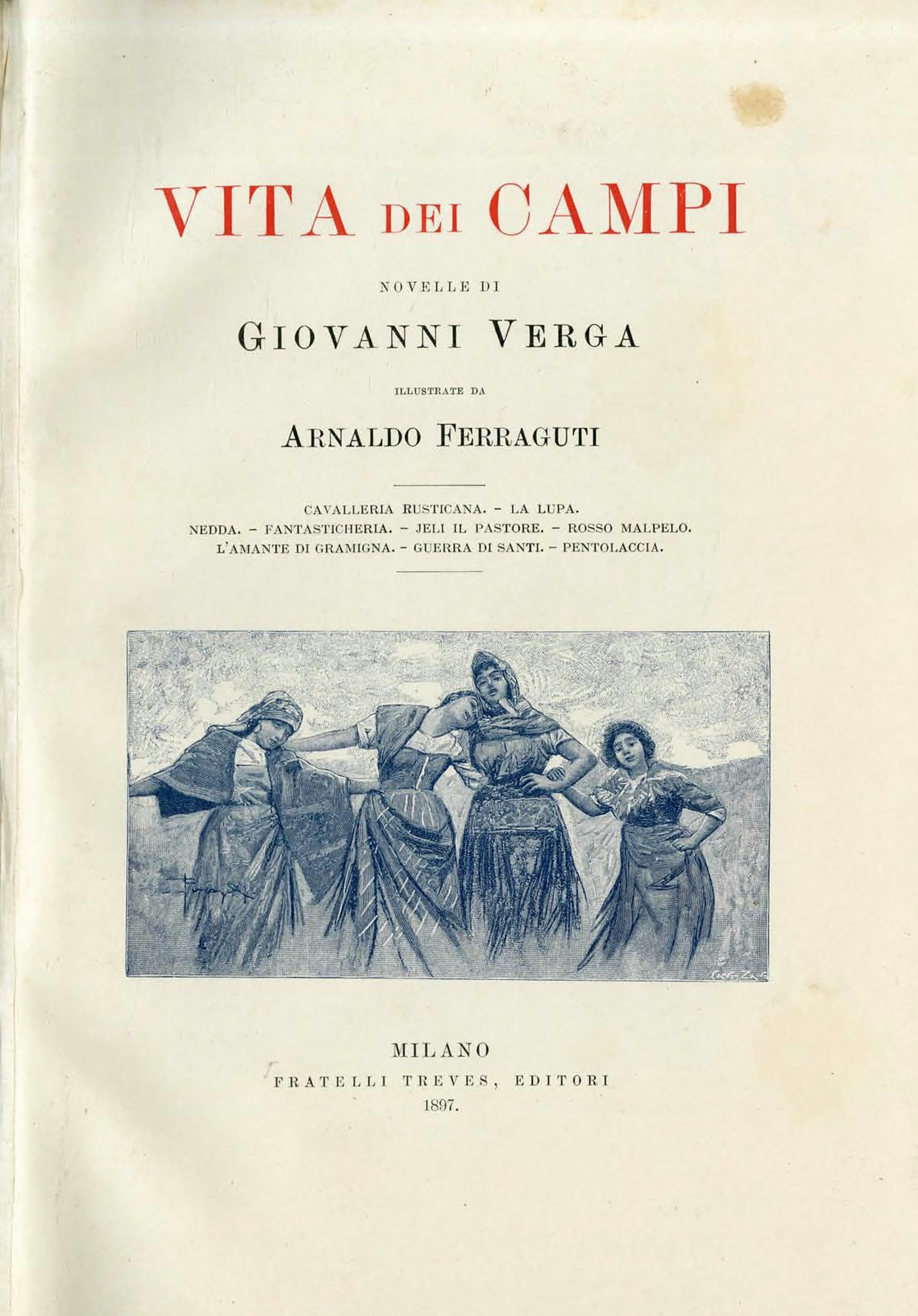
- "La Lupa" was published in Vita dei Campi

Text available at Wikisource
- Country: Italy
- Language: Italian

Publication
- Published in: Vita dei Campi, Cavalleria Rusticana and Other Stories
- Media type: Print
- Publication date: 1880

"La Lupa" ("The She-Wolf") is a short story by Sicilian writer Giovanni Verga, first published in 1880.

== Plot summary ==
The novella is about an aging, beautiful woman, Pina, who is nicknamed "La Lupa" ("the she-wolf") because of her sexual attitude toward men. She has a daughter, Maricchia, who is old enough to be married and has a substantial dowry, yet is not wanted by anyone because of her mother's behaviour. Pina falls in love with a young farmworker, Nanni, who refuses her and says that he wants Maricchia. Pina then makes Maricchia marry Nanni so that she can always have him near, threatening her with death if she refuses. Pina then repeatedly seduces an anguished Nanni despite her daughter's protests. The story ends with Nanni approaching Pina with an axe as she once more attempts to seduce him.

== Publication ==
"La Lupa" is one of a series of short stories about peasant life in Sicily published by Giovanni Verga between March and July 1880. Later that year they were republished as a collection, Vita dei Campi ("Rural Life"). An English translation of "La Lupa", by D. H. Lawrence, was first published in 1928 as part of the collection Cavalleria Rusticana and Other Stories.

== Critical reaction ==
Upon publication, Vita dei Campi was "moderately well received", with reviewers recognising "a new voice speaking in an original way about a world strikingly different from the urban society whose mores preoccupied French realist authors". Writing in Modern Language Notes, Gregory L. Lucente stated "at its appearance 'La Lupa' was regarded as so strikingly realistic to be utterly unlike its predecessors in nineteenth-century Italian fiction". Writing in The Literary Encyclopedia, Susan Amatangelo of the College of the Holy Cross described Vita dei Campi as "the most celebrated collection of short stories written by Giovanni Verga, both because of its significance in the author's artistic journey and because of the fame of particular stories", stating "the stories serve as a preview of the narrative style and themes of his Verist (or Realist) masterworks."

== Adaptations ==
In the early-1890s, Pietro Mascagni set a libretto to Verga's short story "Cavalleria rusticana", producing a highly successful opera of the same name. This brought about "a short-lived fashion for veristic subjects in the Italian musical theatre". Beginning in spring 1893, Giacomo Puccini held an interest in adapting "La Lupa" into an opera. An agreement was reached for Verga to prepare a libretto and Federico De Roberto to carry out its versification. Puccini abandoned the project in 1894 following a discussion with Blandine von Bülow (the stepdaughter of Richard Wagner), having concerns over the "dialogicity" of the libretto and the "unpleasant characters, without one single luminous, sympathetic figure".

In 1896, Verga himself developed "La Lupa" into a play of the same name; it premiered in Turin that same year. A modern production of the play directed by Franco Zeffirelli was staged at the Teatro della Pergola in Florence in 1965.

In 1996, "La Lupa" was adapted into an Italian film of the same name directed by Gabriele Lavia and starring Monica Guerritore as Pina.
