= The Dark Side of Love =

Fotografando Patrizia
- Directed by: Salvatore Samperi
- Written by: Edith Bruck; Salvatore Samperi; Riccardo Ghione
- Starring: Monica Guerritore
- Cinematography: Dante Spinotti
- Edited by: Sergio Montanari
- Music by: Fred Bongusto
- Release date: 1984
- Language: Italian

The Dark Side of Love (Italian: Fotografando Patrizia) is a 1984 Italian erotic romantic drama film written and directed by Salvatore Samperi. The film, which has a scabrous main theme as an incest between a sister and a porn-obsessed brother, was a box office success.

== Cast ==
- Monica Guerritore as Patrizia
- Lorenzo Lenaas Emilio
- Gianfranco Manfredi as Franco Alessi
- Saverio Vallone as Arrigo
- Gilla Novak as Patrizia's Friend
