= La lupa (1996 film) =

- Directed by: Gabriele Lavia
- Based on: "La Lupa" by Giovanni Verga
- Starring: Monica Guerritore; Raoul Bova; Alessia Fugardi; Michele Placido; Giancarlo Giannini
- Cinematography: Mario Vulpiani
- Music by: Ennio Morricone
- Production companies: Globe Films; Production Group
- Distributed by: 20th Century Fox
- Release date: 4 October 1996
- Country: Italy
- Languages: Italian; Sicilian
- Box office: 3.5 billion lira (Italy)

La lupa is a 1996 Italian erotic drama film directed by Gabriele Lavia. It is based on the novella with the same name by Giovanni Verga.

== Cast ==
- Monica Guerritore: Gnà Pina "la lupa"
- Raoul Bova: Nanni Lasca
- Alessia Fugardi: Maricchia
- Michele Placido: Malerba
- Giancarlo Giannini: Father Angiolino
- Carlo Valli: Narrator (voice)
