= Jeli il pastore =

Jeli the Shepherd (it. "Jeli il Pastore") is a short story written by Italian author Giovanni Verga as a part of his collection The Life of the Fields.

== Plot ==
The story focuses on a young horse-herd named Jeli, who, orphaned at a tender age, has always lived alone in the fields. The first part of the story concentrates on Jeli's childhood in the middle of the Sicilian fields, where he befriends don Alfonso, the son of a bourgeois man. During his childhood, he also meets Mara, with whom he falls hopelessly in love. After Mara leaves, Jeli loses his job on the festival day of St. John because of a distraction. It is only because of the kindness of Mara's father, Aggripino, that Jeli is able to find new work as a shepherd. In time, Mara is ready to marry the son of another well-off farmer in the area, but she is seduced by don Alfonso and the engagement is annulled. Jelo offers to marry Mara instead. At first, everything goes well and Mara appears to be the sweetest wife who has ever lived. However, after a short time, Jeli begins to harbor doubt about Mara's faithfulness. His jealousy reaches a boiling point when, while attending a festival at a farm, Don Alfonso asks Mara to dance. Jeli is overcome with jealousy and slits Don Alfonso's throat. Jeli is then presumably arrested, and the story ends with him being brought before a judge, seemingly confused as to why he is in trouble for his crime.
