= Pina Cei =

Italian actress (1904–2000)

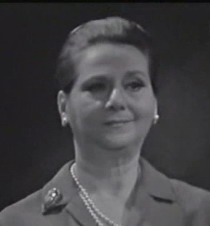
- Cei in 1969
- Born: 13 June 1904; San Juan, Puerto Rico
- Died: 1 February 2000 (aged 95); Rome, Italy
- Occupation: Actress
- Years active: 1934–1995

Pina Cei (born Giuseppina Casini; 13 June 1904 – 1 February 2000) was an Italian stage, film and television actress. She appeared in more than thirty films from 1933 to 1995.

== Life and career ==
The daughter of the stage actress Luisa Cei, she made her theatrical debut in 1922, in the company of Raffaele Niccoli. She later worked in several high-profile stage companies, including Emma Gramatica's and Ruggero Ruggeri's, until 1942, when she founded her own stage company. She made her film debut in 1933, in Villafranca, in which she is credited as Pia Torriani (from her husband's surname). Her younger sister Dory was also an actress.

== Filmography ==
Year	Title	Role	Notes
1934	Villafranca	principessa Clotilde di Savoia	
1935	Maestro Landi	Sua moglie	
1958	Camping	Mother of Nino and Valeria	
1958	La Gioconda		
1968	Il marito è mio e l'ammazzo quando mi pare		
1973	Love and Anarchy	Madame Aïda	
1974	Nipoti miei diletti	Elisabetta's housekeeper	
1976	The Mistress Is Served	Countess Fanny	
1977	Cara sposa	Elvira	
1982	La Traviata	Annina	
1983	A Joke of Destiny	Donna Sofia	
1985	Scandalous Gilda	Hilda	
1986	Open Sesame		TV series
1987	Dark Eyes	Elisa's Mother	
1990	Tre colonne in cronaca	Margherita	
1991	The Party's Over	Nonna Zaira	
1994	Anche i commercialisti hanno un'anima		
1994	OcchioPinocchio	Colomba	
