= Loba (card game) =

South American card game

Loba (Spanish for 'she-wolf') or Loba Carioca, is a popular South American card game. The game is often played with two to six players. It is popular in Argentina and Bolivia. It is a variant of Rummy. The game is often played with two card decks (104 cards and four jokers total). There are multiple variations of the game, and rules vary from place to place. The game is originally from Central America.

== Objective ==
The goal of the game is to lose all cards in one’s hand. Cards are played by lying down combinations on the table either in runs or sets.
