= Lupae =

Lupa (Latin for "she-wolf"; plural: Lupae) can refer to:

- a female wolf
- the goddess Artemis/Diana, in her "wolf form"; see Lupa (mythology) and e.g. Lupa Capitolina
- the lowest class of Roman prostitutes, see Prostitution in ancient Rome#Brothels
- Lupa a former genus of Atlantic crabs; see e.g. Callinectes sapidus formerly Lupa hastata, Portunus sayi formerly Lupa sayi, etc.
- Lupa (ship), an 18th-century slave ship
