= I Malavoglia =

1881 book by Giovanni Verga

i Malavoglia
- Title page of a 1907 edition
- Author: Giovanni Verga

I Malavoglia (Italian pronunciation: [i malaˈvɔʎʎa]) is the best known novel by Giovanni Verga. It was first printed in 1881.

== Background ==
The readers' good reception of the short story Nedda, published in 1874, encouraged the project of a "sea sketch" entitled Padron 'Ntoni. In a letter dated September 1875, Verga informs the publisher Treves that he has almost finished a new story and he will receive it soon. Six years would pass instead: Padron 'Ntoni would be transformed into a novel, entitled I Malavoglia. In a letter to his friend Salvatore Paolo Verdura, Verga states that I Malavoglia is the first in a cycle of five narrative works, the Ciclo dei Vinti, a "phantasmagoria of the struggle for life, which extends from the ragman to the minister and the artist".

The other works of the cycle are Mastro-don Gesualdo, La Duchessa di Leyra, L'Onorevole Scipioni and L'uomo di lusso, works which deal with the problem of social and economical advancement. La Duchessa de Leyra remained only a draft, while the last two novels planned for the Ciclo, L'Onorevole Scipioni and L'Uomo di Lusso, were not even started.

== Plot ==
In the village of Aci Trezza in the Province of Catania lives the Toscano family, who, although extremely hardworking, has been nicknamed (for antiphrasis) the Malavoglia ("The Lazy Ones"). The head of the family is Padron Ntoni, a widower, who lives at the house by the medlar tree with his son Bastian (called Bastianazzo), and the wife of the latter called Maria (nicknamed Maruzza la Longa, despite being anything but tall). Bastian has five children: Ntoni, Luca, Filomena (Mena), Alessio (called Alessi) and Rosalia (Lia). The main source of income is la Provvidenza (the Providence), which is a small fishing boat. In 1863, Ntoni, the eldest of the children, leaves for the military service. To try to make up for the loss of income which his absence will cause, Padron Ntoni attempts a business venture and buys a large amount of lupins. The load is entrusted to his son Bastianazzo, the plan being to sell them in Riposto to make a profit. However, Bastianazzo and the merchandise are tragically lost during a storm. Following this misfortune, the family finds themselves with a triple misfortune: the debt caused by the lupins which were bought on credit, the Providence to repair, and the loss of Bastianazzo, an important and loved member of the family. Having finished his military service, Ntoni returns to the laborious life of his family very reluctantly, having seen the riches and splendour outside his small village, and does not represent any support to the already precarious economic situation of his family.

The family's misfortunes are far from over. Luca, one of Padron Ntoni's grandsons, dies at the battle of Lissa, which leads to the breaking off of the betrothal of Mena to Brasi Cipolla. The debt from the lupin venture causes the family to lose their beloved "Casa del Nespolo" – the house by the medlar tree, and gradually the reputation of the family worsens until they reach humiliating levels of poverty. A further wreck of the Providence leaves Padron Ntoni near death, although fortunately he manages to recover. Later Maruzza, his daughter-in-law, dies of cholera. The firstborn, Ntoni, decides to go away from the village to seek his fortune, only to return destitute. He loses any desire to work, turning to alcoholism and idleness. The departure of Ntoni had forced the family to sell the Providence to get the money needed to get back the Casa del Nespolo, which had never been forgotten.

The mistress of the osteria, Santuzza, who is already coveted by the sharkish Don Michele, becomes infatuated with Ntoni, serving him for free in the tavern. The conduct of Ntoni and the lamentations of her father convince her to turn her emotions from him, and to return to Don Michele. This leads to a brawl between the two; a brawl that results in the stabbing of Don Michele in the chest by Ntoni during an anti-smuggling raid. Ntoni ends up in prison. At his trial, after hearing rumours about a relationship between Don Michele and his granddaughter Lia, Padron Ntoni passes out and falls to the ground. Now old, his conversation is disjointed and he recites his proverbs without much awareness of what is going on. Lia, the younger sister, becomes the victim of vicious village gossip, runs away and becomes a prostitute. Mena, because of the shameful situation of her sister, feels that she cannot marry Alfio, even though they love each other, and instead remains at home to care for Alessi and Nunziata's children. Alessi, the youngest of the brothers, has remained a fisherman and with hard work manages to rebuild the family fortunes to the point at which they can repurchase the house by the medlar tree. Having bought the house, what is left of the family visits the hospital where the old Padron Ntoni is being kept, to inform him of the good news and to announce his imminent return home. It is the last moment of happiness for the old man, who dies on the day he was to return. Even his desire to die in the house where was born is never granted. When Ntoni is released from prison and comes back to the village, he realises that he cannot stay because of all that he has done. He has excluded himself from his family by systematically denouncing their values.

== English translations ==
An English edition, The House by the Medlar-Tree (1890), translated by Mary A. Craig, was published in the Continental Classics series. Another English translation, by Raymond Rosenthal, was published in 1964 by The New American Library as a Signet Classic. It claims to be "the only complete version of the novel in English." A new English translation, by Judith Landry with a chronology and introduction by Eric Lane, was published in 1985 by Dedalus in the Dedalus European Classics series.

== Film adaptations ==
A film based on the story of I Malavoglia, La Terra Trema (English: The Earth Trembles), was directed by Luchino Visconti in 1948. In the book by Silvia Iannello Le immagini e le parole dei Malavoglia (Sovera, Roma, 2008) the author selects some passages of the Verga novel I Malavoglia, adds original comments and Acitrezza's photographic images, and devotes a chapter to the origins, remarks and frames taken from the film La terra trema.
