= Gabriele Lavia =

Italian actor, film director and theatre director (born 1942)

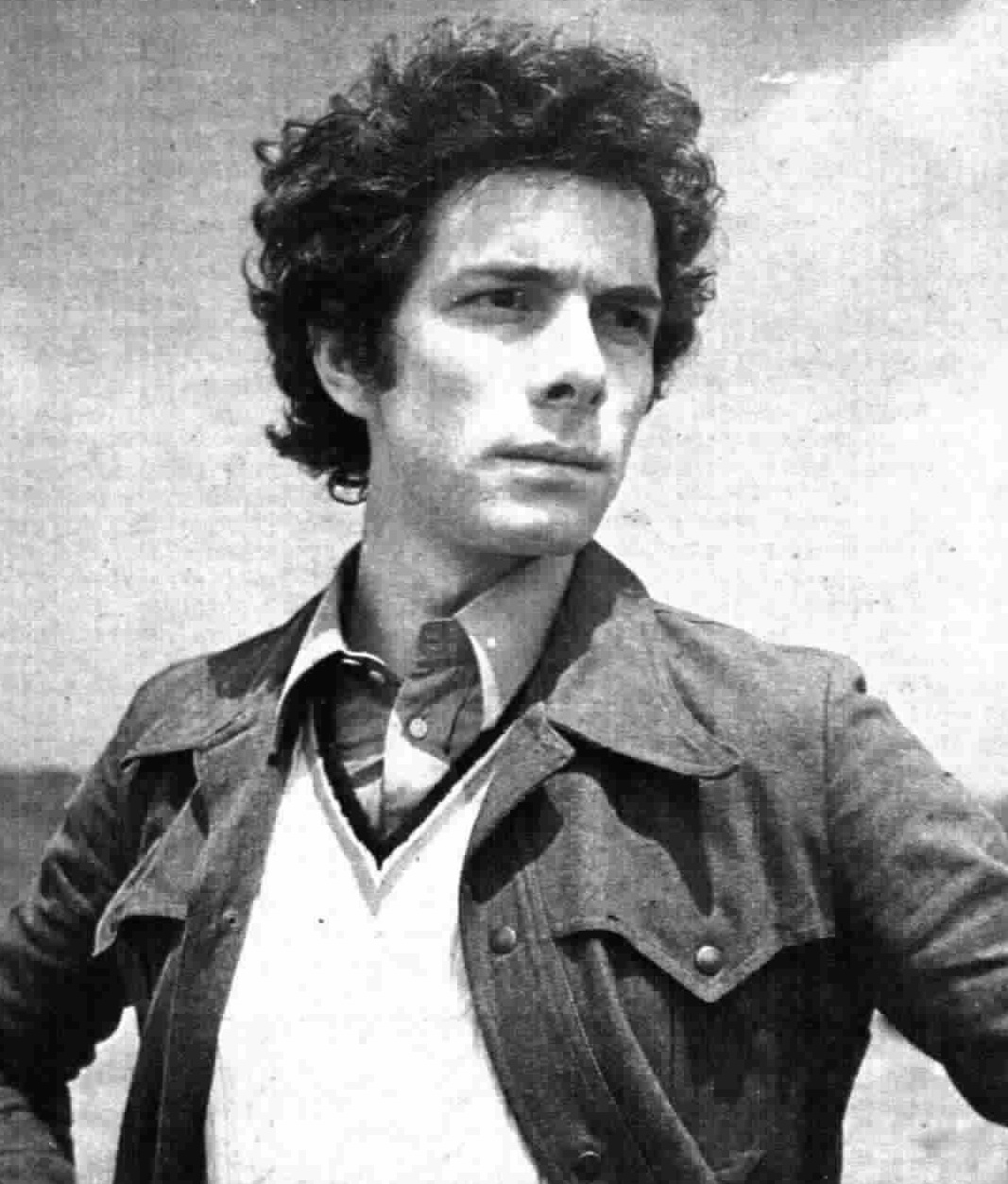
- Born: 10 October 1942 (age 83); Milan, Italy
- Occupations: Actor, director, theatre director
- Years active: 1969–present
- Height: 1.78 m (5 ft 10 in)

Gabriele Lavia (born 10 October 1942) is an Italian actor, film director and theatre director.

== Biography ==
Lavia was born in Milan, Lombardy. Since 1970 he has had roles in nearly thirty films and television programs. He is known for his appearances in several horror films, including Beyond the Door (1974), Dario Argento's Deep Red (1975), Inferno (1980), and Sleepless (2001), and Pupi Avati's Zeder (1983).

In Italy, Lavia has had a long career as a theatrical actor and director. He was the artistic co-director of the Teatro Eliseo of Rome (from 1980 to 1987), artistic director of the Teatro Stabile of Turin (from 1997 to the 2000) and artistic director of the Taormina Film Fest (in 1993).

He has directed six films, most of which he has written or co-written, including Il Principe di Homburg (1983), based on Heinrich von Kleist's play Prinz Friedrich von Homburg, for which he won the Nastro d'Argento Best New Director Award, and Sensi (U.S. title: Evil Senses) (1986), an erotic thriller with Monica Guerritore, his wife at the time.
