= Giovanni Verga =

Italian writer (1840–1922)

Signore Giovanni Verga OCI OSML
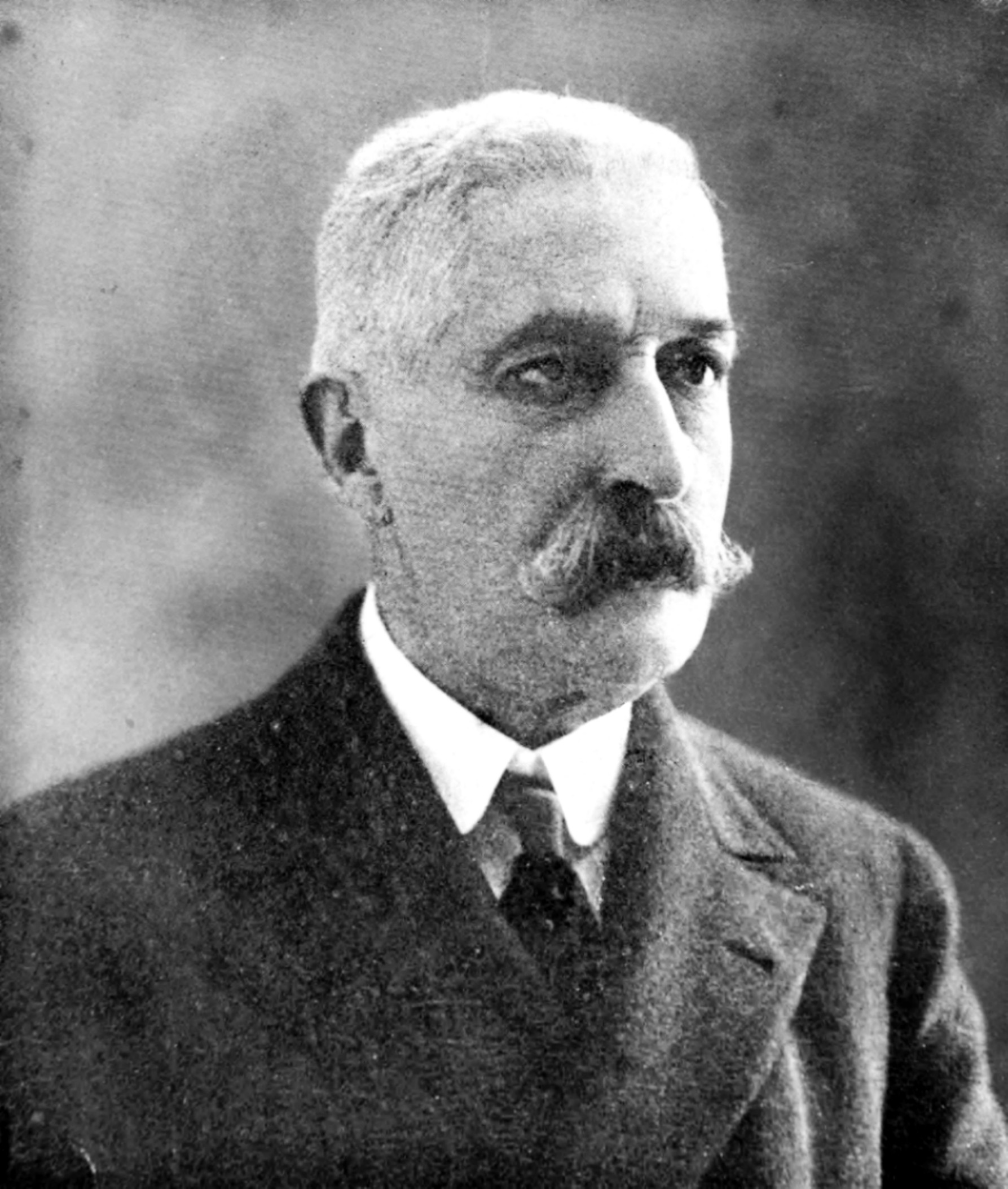

Senator of the Kingdom of Italy
- In office 3 October 1920 – 27 January 1922
- Appointed by: Victor Emmanuel III

Personal details
- Born: Giovanni Carmelo Verga; 2 September 1840 Catania, Kingdom of the Two Sicilies
- Died: 27 January 1922 (aged 81) Catania, Kingdom of Italy
- Party: Historical Left (1890–1896); Historical Right (1896–1911); Italian Nationalist Association (1911–1922)
- Occupation: Writer
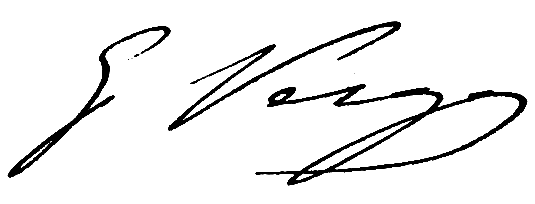
- Signature

Giovanni Carmelo Verga di Fontanabianca (Italian: [dʒoˈvanni karˈmɛːlo ˈverɡa]; 2 September 1840 – 27 January 1922) was an Italian realist (verista) writer. His novels I Malavoglia (1881) and Mastro-don Gesualdo (1889) are widely recognized as masterpieces. Verga has been called the greatest Italian novelist after Manzoni. D. H. Lawrence translated several of his works into English.

== Life and career ==
=== Early life and works ===
The first son of Giovanni Battista Catalano Verga and Caterina Di Mauro, Verga was born into a prosperous family of Vizzini in Sicily. He began writing in his teens, producing the historical novel Amore e Patria (Love and Homeland) when he was only 16 years old. Although nominally studying law at the University of Catania, he used money his father had given him to publish his I carbonari della montagna (The Carbonari of the Mountain) in 1861 and 1862. This was followed by Sulle lagune (On the Lagoons) in 1863.

A first turning point in Verga's career came with a visit to Florence in 1865, during which he wrote Una peccatrice (Eng. trans. A mortal sin, 1995). Unlike his previous works, this was not a patriotic, historical novel, but a novel about romantic love. The hero, an artist, falls in love with a femme fatale; he becomes a success and wins her, but once the woman is his, he tires of her and eventually she kills herself. Plainly Verga's attention had shifted from society and political passions to the passions of the individual.

=== Florence ===
Meanwhile, Verga had been serving in the Catania National Guard (1860–64), after which he travelled to Florence several times, settling there in 1869. Important personalities stayed in this city, and the cultural debate on subjects such as physiology, positivism, and Darwinism was lively. Francesco Dall'Ongaro, who belonged to the older Romantic generation, took him under his wing, and suggested he write about the plight of a girl obliged to become a nun. The result was the highly successful epistolary novel Storia di una capinera (Eng. trans. Sparrow, 2008), published in 1871. Verga moves away from schoolbook rhetoric and assumes the ingenuous tone of a young girl, Maria, writing to a friend. Furthermore, as later with verismo, the determining motivations are economic. Maria's father, a widower, marries again and leaves his daughter without a dowry or inheritance, both being set aside for the new stepsister, whilst the only option for Maria is to become a nun. Maria falls in love with a young man, but he pursues his own financial interests and abandons her for the stepsister. Maria has now no escape from the nunnery; she goes mad and dies.

Whilst still in Florence, Verga began to be influenced by the Scapigliatura, as is evident from Eva (1873). The theme of this novel, which played a vital role in his development as an author, is the fate of art in modern society, particularly in relation to economic factors. Eva is a dancer who sells her art to the public. The painter Enrico Lanti, in order to succeed financially, must also abandon his romantic ideals and learn to produce a vulgar form of art, which is the only sort that the public likes. When Enrico convinces Eva to live with him in poverty in a garret, she loses the appeal given her by the stage and wealth. After their separation, Enrico tries to get her back and is wounded in a duel with her new lover. Totally defeated, he returns to Sicily to await death.

=== From Scapigliatura to verismo ===
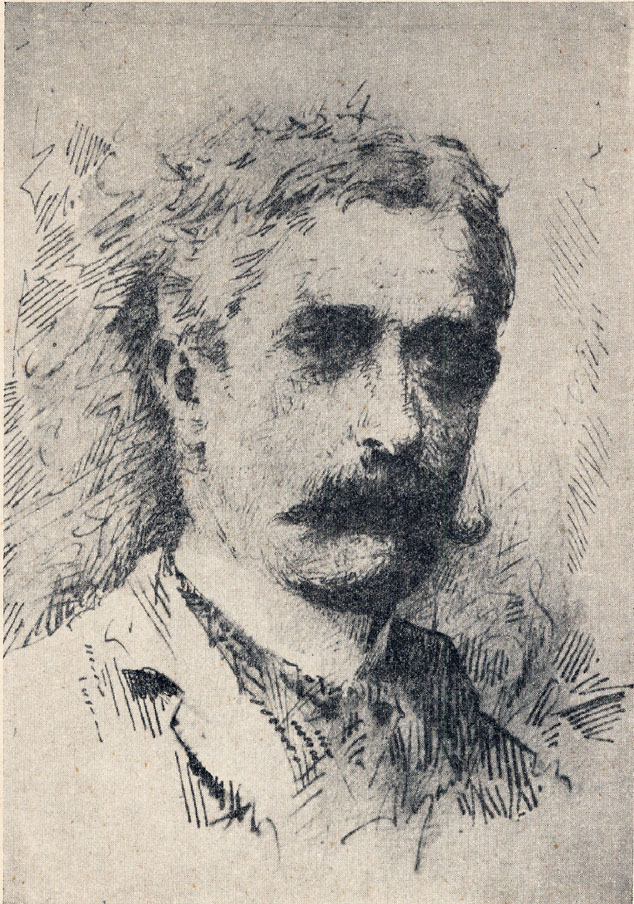
Portrait of the young Verga by Antonino Gandolfo

In 1872 Verga settled in Milan and had direct contact with Scapigliatura writers. In this period this city was the most modern one of the peninsula, economic capital and home to the main newspapers and major publishing houses to come into contact with modernity. He became assiduous with the most famous Milanese cultural circles, such as the salon of Countess Clara Maffei. He befriended unruly writers and teamed up at the Cova café with authors, publishers and literary critics. His next novels, Tigre reale (1874) and Eros (1875), are typical Scapigliato products. In both, a contrast is drawn between the false, cynical life of the urban upper classes and family virtues embodied in a female character. However, also in 1874, he wrote ‘Nedda’, a novella with a Sicilian setting, which is in a much more realist vein than anything else he had so far written, though the narrative impersonality which will distinguish his verismo is still absent. It tells the story of a poor olive-gatherer and her love for a young peasant, Janu, who dies when she is pregnant with his child. Abandoned by everyone, Nedda has to watch her baby daughter die in dire poverty.

In 1877 Verga published a collection of his stories—all either late Romantic or Scapigliato in manner—as Primavera e altri racconti. At the end of the same year, his most important friend, the Sicilian writer and critic Luigi Capuana, also settled in Milan. The two were deeply impressed by Zola's L'Assommoir, also published that year, and decided to take it as a literary model. Thus, in late 1877 and early 1878, as a result of the encounter with French Naturalism, verismo came into being as an avant-garde movement aiming to create the modern novel which Verga and Capuana felt Italy lacked. They made it a prerequisite that the writer should assume a scientific stance, as proposed by contemporary positivism; reality should furnish inspiration and the work of literature should be a document created with the impersonality that had already been theorized in France by Flaubert and Zola.

=== The masterpieces of maturity ===
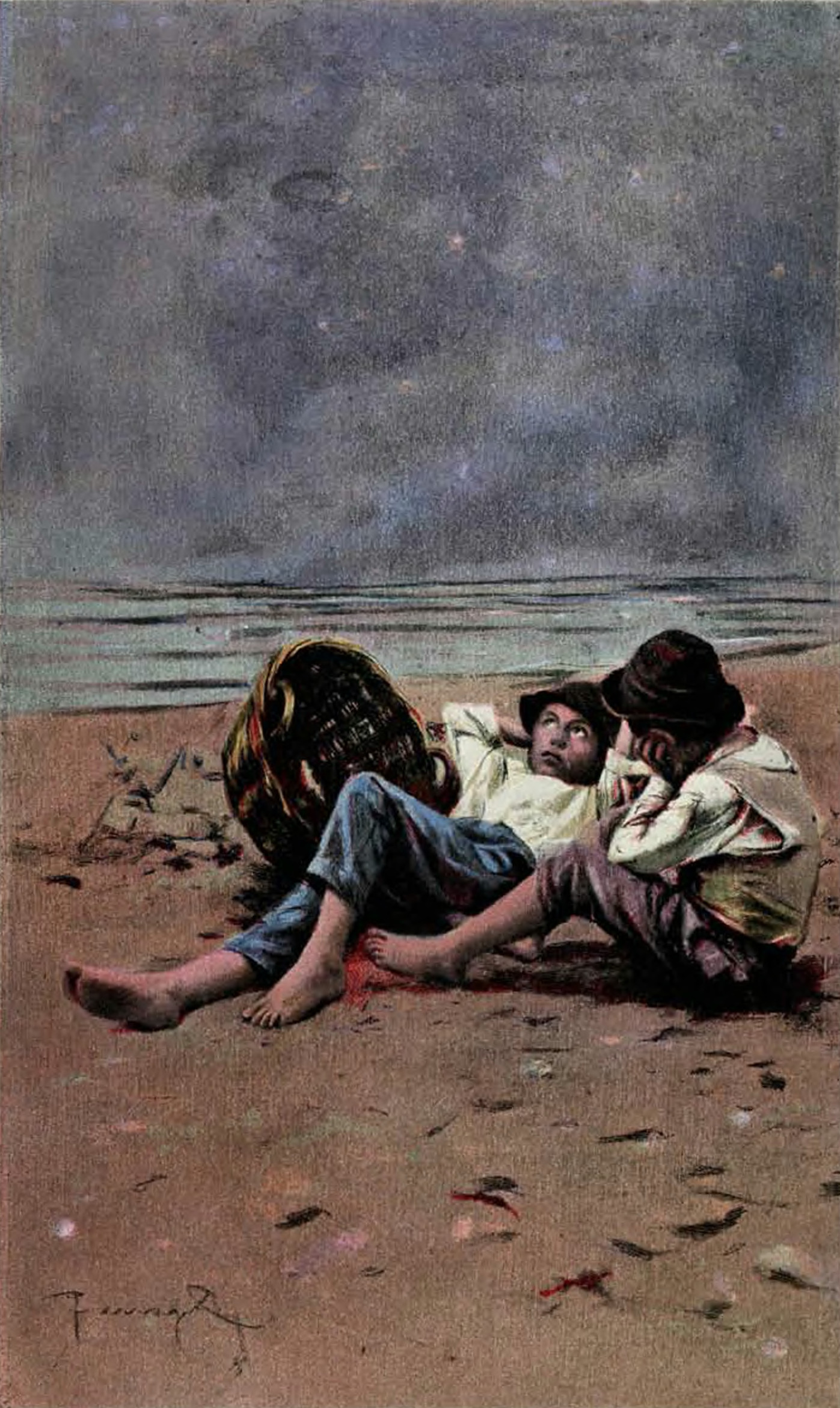
Illustration for the Treves edition of Vergas's Vita dei campi, Milan, 1897

The first example of the new manner was ‘Rosso Malpelo’, a story written between spring and summer 1878 about an orphan boy who works as a miner and is tormented by everyone else (including, it seems, the narrative voice) on the grounds that his red hair signals an evil character. It was included in Vita dei campi (1880), a collection of novelle with Sicilian peasant settings. This is Verga's first work of verismo and includes other famous stories such as ‘Jeli il pastore’, ‘La lupa’, ‘Fantasticheria’ (Daydreaming), and ‘Pentolaccia’ (The Plaything). It also included ‘Cavalleria rusticana’ ("Rustic Chivalry"), which he adapted for the theatre - and later formed the basis for several opera librettos, including Mascagni's Cavalleria rusticana and Gastaldon's Mala Pasqua! Another novella, ‘L'amante di Gramigna’, opens with a brief exposition of the theory of verismo.

Following Vita dei campi, Verga embarked on a projected series of five novels, the Ciclo dei vinti (Cycle of the Vanquished) dealing with the problem of social and economic advancement. He had already been working on a ‘bozzetto marinaresco’, or seafaring sketch, called provisionally ‘Padron 'Ntoni’. After the decision to espouse verismo, he destroyed the manuscript and rewrote the work from scratch. The rewriting grew into I Malavoglia (1881), which is one of the great works of Italian fiction after Unification. It is the story of the gradual decline of the Malavoglia family, brought about by a mixture of factors—natural disasters, usury, of which the head of the family, Padron 'Ntoni, is the victim, and the corruption of the grandson, the young 'Ntoni. As in Vita dei campi, impersonality means adopting the point of view of the community of fishermen and peasants. This view from below is maintained rigorously throughout the novel, and constitutes its fundamental stylistic innovation. But the novel blends naturalism, symbolism, a realism which is accurate in every detail, and a narrative movement with both epic and lyric qualities. In focusing on the plight of small-scale property owners in thrall to usury and laws regarding military service (which removed sons of working age from the land), it also articulates one of the most explosive issues regarding the Italian South at the time.

I Malavoglia was to be the first of ‘I vinti’, a cycle of five novels about modern Italian life, from the lowest to the highest social classes. After the fishermen and peasants of I Malavoglia, Mastro-don Gesualdo would depict the provincial bourgeoisie of Sicily, La duchessa di Leyra, the Palermo nobility, L'Onorevole Scipioni, the world of parliamentary government in Rome, and L'Uomo di Lusso, the vain luxury of contemporary art. Only the first two were completed. Though Verga made a start on the third, he did not even sketch out the last two. Other considerations aside, he would always have difficulty using verismo to depict the upper classes.

Whilst in I Malavoglia the values of the family, honesty, and hard work, as practised by old Padron 'Ntoni, prevail, ideal values fade from the picture of society presented in subsequent works. The dominant motif is ‘la roba’, the accumulation without moral scruples of goods, land, and money. The pessimism evident in all Verga's fiction now becomes radical. Economic considerations are paramount in the two collections of novelle published in 1883 — Novelle rusticane, again set amongst the poor of Sicily, and Per le vie, about the urban proletariat of Milan. Some of the Novelle rusticane are intensely powerful: ‘Libertà’, for instance, is the story of a bloody peasant revolt during Garibaldi's Expedition of the Thousand of 1860, whilst ‘La roba’ anticipates Mastro-don Gesualdo in portraying a peasant who grows rich enough to supplant a noble feudal owner and take over his land.

This was a highly productive phase. Verga was now also writing fiction probing the urban bourgeoisie and the nobility. Il marito di Elena (1882) has a distinctly Flaubertian orientation, with its condemnation of the vain romantic whims of a bourgeois wife who betrays her husband and is finally killed by him. The stories of Drammi intimi (1884) return to the romantic passions of earlier novels but now with sceptical and ironic detachment. He also gave birth to veristic drama with a stage version of Cavalleria rusticana, which, with Eleonora Duse in the main role, enjoyed great success in 1884.

He was now at work on Mastro-don Gesualdo and published a series of preparatory novelle in 1887 as Vagabondaggio. The novel itself, first serialized in Nuova Antologia in 1888, was extended and revised for publication in book form in Milan the following year. It is the story of a jobbing builder who makes money, becomes middle-class and, in order to climb further socially, marries a woman from the nobility, Bianca Trao. However he only becomes a hybrid of builder (mastro) and noble (don), and every outward success leads to an inner failure. The tyranny of economic logic forces Gesualdo to abandon the people closest to him and condemns him to inner isolation. In the end he dies alone and in despair in the house of his daughter Isabella, Duchess of Leyra (who was to have been the protagonist of the third novel of the ‘Vinti’ cycle). Mastro-don Gesualdo is the most bitter and harshly pessimistic of Verga's novels.

=== Later life ===
Posthumous edition of Verga's unfinished novel La duchessa di Leyra, introduced by Federico De Roberto

Times were changing. At the end of the 1870s Verga was in the intellectual and cultural forefront. He knew intellectuals, such as Leopoldo Franchetti and Sidney Sonnino, who were working on the Southern question, and wrote for their Rassegna settimanale. He was also in touch with Scapigliati, such as Luigi Gualdo and Arrigo and Camillo Boito, whilst he and Luigi Capuana were the motive forces behind an advanced literary movement whose importance was quickly fully acknowledged. By the mid-1880s he was already becoming more isolated. Now Decadentism arrived, signalled by the publication in 1889 of D'Annunzio's Il Piacere. Verga, however, remained faithful to verismo. In 1891 he published the stories of I ricordi del capitano d'Arce, which are set amongst the nobility and urban upper classes. In 1893 he returned to Catania, and largely isolated himself from literary society. He worked on the third novel in the ‘Vinti’ cycle, but, despite the documentary material which his notes show he collected during the 1890s, he completed just one chapter of La duchessa di Leyra.

The silence of his last years was rarely broken. He wrote some isolated stories, the most noteworthy being La caccia al lupo, which he also made into a play. There was also a collection of novelle, Don Candeloro e C.i (1894), the themes and techniques of which seem to look forwards to Pirandello, and the drama, Dal tuo al mio (1903), which he then turned into a novel. He was made a senator for life in 1920. To celebrate his 80th birthday, Pirandello gave a lecture in Catania in which he praised his work—and I Malavoglia in particular—over that of D'Annunzio. He died of a cerebral thrombosis in 1922. He was an atheist. In 2022 the official Verga 100 event was launched, dedicated to the centenary of the writer, with many events from Palermo to Milan, from theater to musical performances, Cinema, and Book Festival.

=== Giovanni Verga House-Museum ===
Verga's house in the city of Catania on via Sant'Anna #8 is now a museum dedicated to the author. The Casa-Museo Giovanni Verga is located on the second floor of a generally unimposing 18th-century palace. The furnishings were those present at the time of his death, including his large personal library. Also in Catania, a performance stage that often performs works of local artists, the Teatro Verga, was founded in 1969 in a former cinema located on Via Giuseppe Fava #34.

== Bibliography ==
A 20th-century edition of I Malavoglia

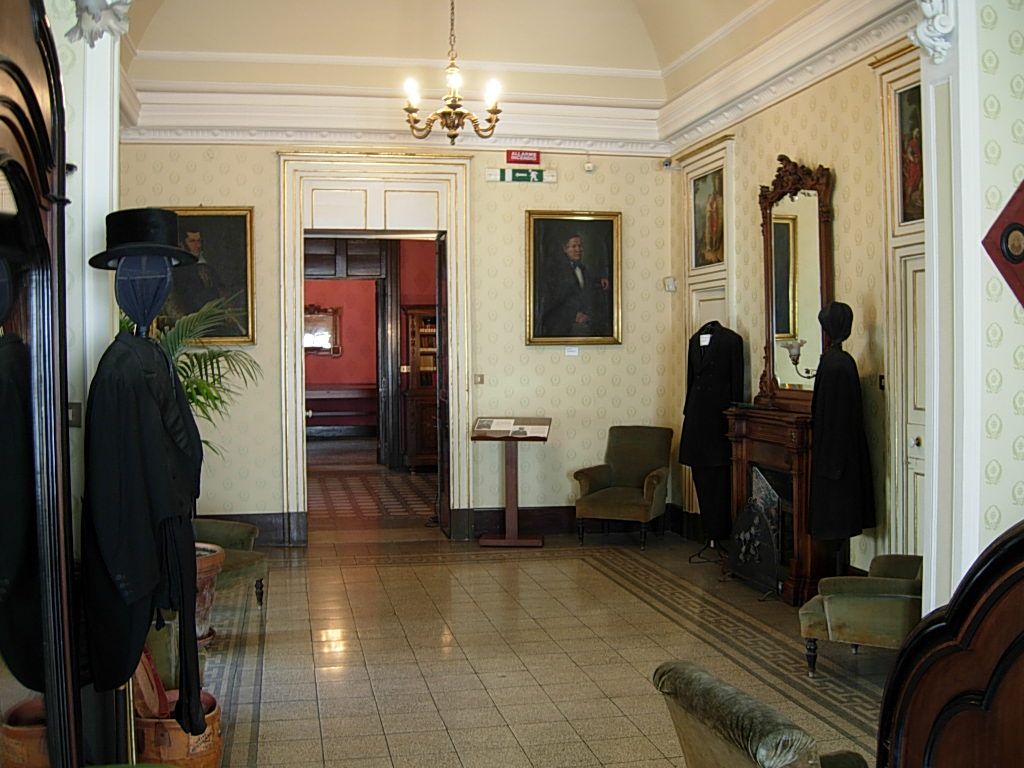
Verga's house-museum in Catania

=== Novels ===
- Love and Homeland (1856–1857) (Amore e patria)
- Carbonari of the Mountain (1861–1862) (I carbonari della montagna)
- On the Lagoons (1862–1863) (Sulle lagune)
- A Sinner (1866) (Una peccatrice)
- Story of a Blackcap (1871) (Storia di una capinera)
- Eva (1873) (Eva)
- Eros (1875) (Eros)
- Royal Tiger (1875) (Tigre reale)
- The House by the Medlar-Tree (1881) (I Malavoglia)
- Elena's Husband (1882) (Il marito di Elena)
- Mastro-don Gesualdo (1889) (Mastro-don Gesualdo)
- From Yours to Mine (1905) (Dal tuo al mio)

=== Short stories ===
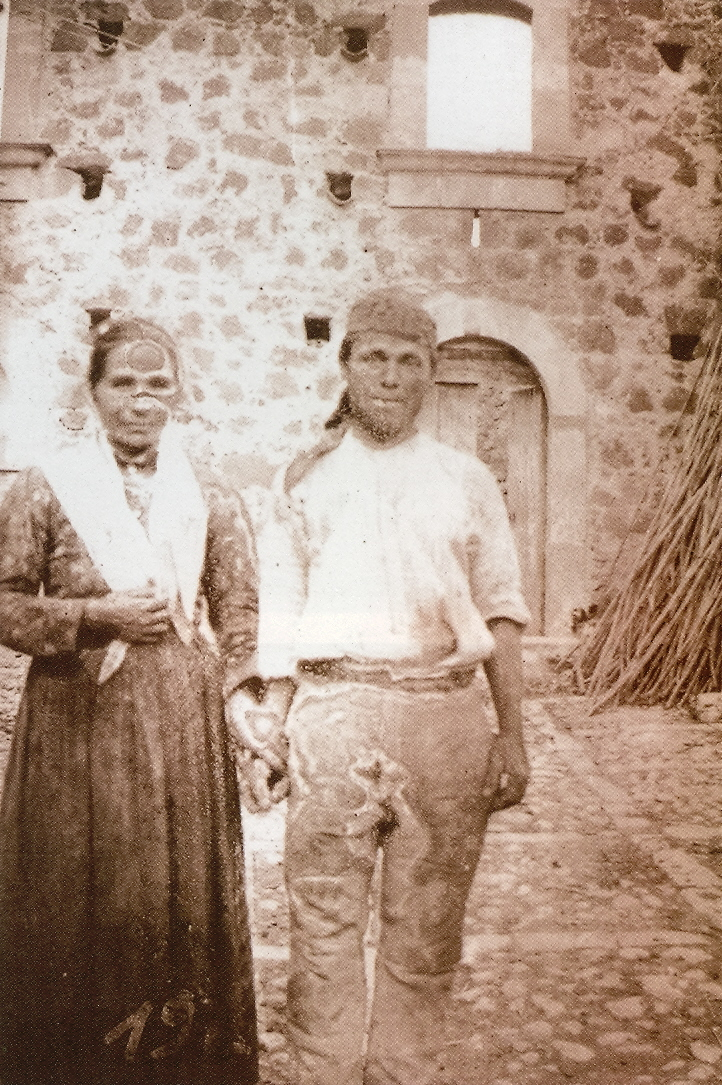
Photo by Verga of Sicilian couple who worked his property in 1897

- Nedda (1874)
- The She-Wolf (1874) (La Lupa)

Spring and other Stories (1877) (Primavera e altri racconti)

- Spring (Primavera)
- The Tail of the Devil (La coda del diavolo)
- X (X)
- Certain Subjects (Certi argomenti)
- The Stories of the Trezza's Castle (Le storie del castello di Trezza)
- Red Evil Hair (1878) (Rosso Malpelo)

The Life of the Fields (1880) (Vita dei campi)

- Rustic Chivalry (also translated as Rustic Honour) (Cavalleria rusticana)
- Jeli the Shepherd (Jeli il pastore)

Little Novels of Sicily (1883) (Novelle rusticane) translated by D. H. Lawrence (1925)

- His Reverence (Il reverendo)
- So Much for the King (Cos'è il re)
- Don Licciu Papa (Don Licciu papa)
- The Mystery Play (Il mistero)
- Malaria (Malaria)
- The Orphans (Gli orfani)
- Property (La roba)
- Story of St. Joseph's Ass (Storia dell'asino di S. Giuseppe)
- Black Bread (Pane nero)
- The Gentry (I galantuomini)
- Liberty (Libertà)
- Across the Sea (Di là del mare)
