= Gastaldon =

Gastaldon is a surname. Notable people with the surname include:

- Stanislao Gastaldon (1861–1939), Italian composer;
- Vidya Gastaldon (born 1974), Franco-Swiss visual artist.
