= Cavalleria rusticana =

1890 opera by Pietro Mascagni

- Opera by Pietro Mascagni
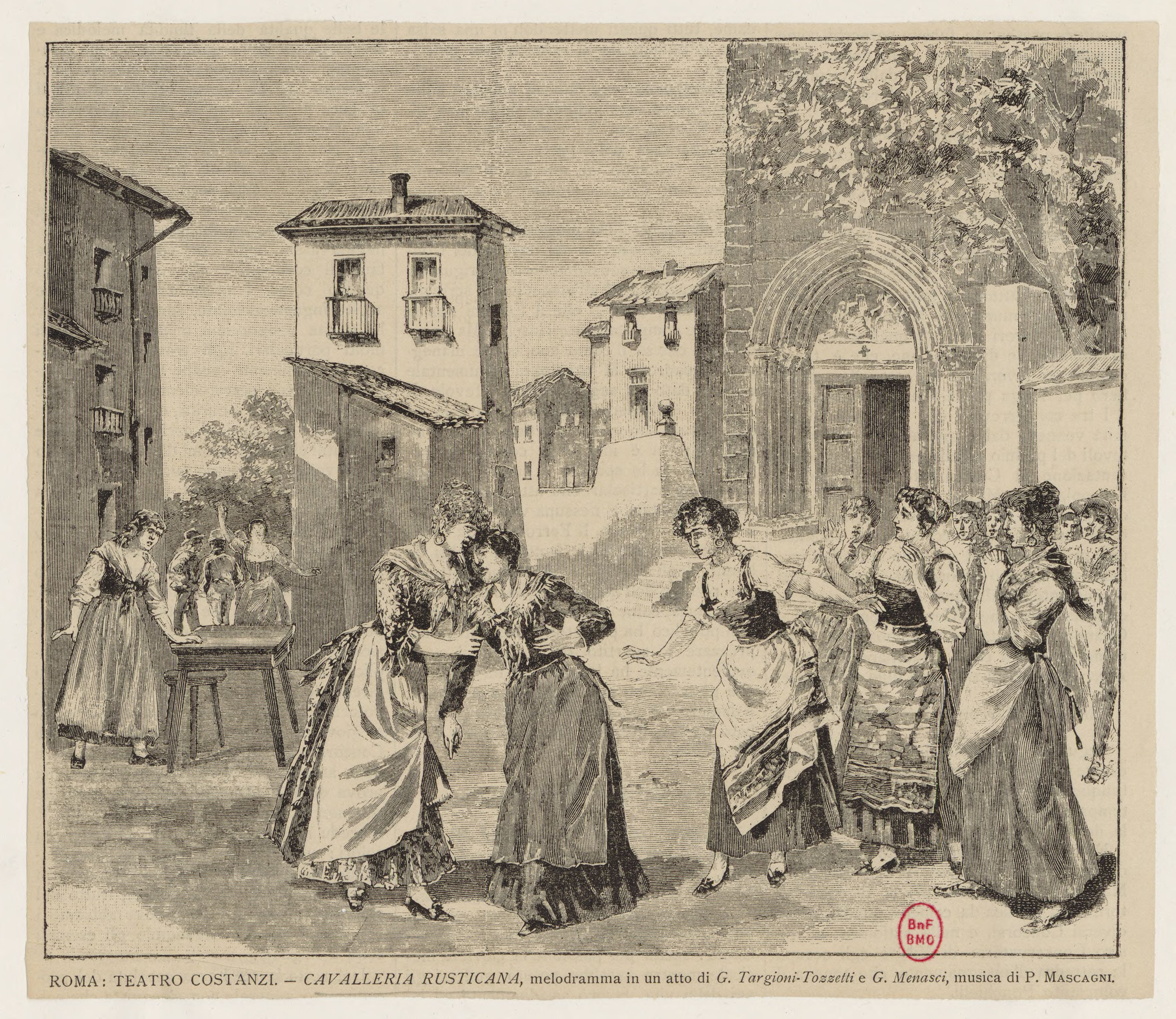
- Scene from the world premiere of the opera
- Librettist: Giovanni Targioni-Tozzetti and Guido Menasci
- Language: Italian
- Based on: Cavalleria rusticana
- Premiere: 17 May 1890; Teatro Costanzi, Rome

Cavalleria rusticana (pronounced [kavalleˈriːa rustiˈkaːna]; Italian for 'Rustic Chivalry') is an opera in one act by Pietro Mascagni to an Italian libretto by Giovanni Targioni-Tozzetti and Guido Menasci, adapted from an 1880 short story of the same name and subsequent play by Giovanni Verga. Considered one of the classic verismo operas, it premiered on 17 May 1890 at the Teatro Costanzi in Rome. Since 1893, it has often been performed in a so-called "Cav/Pag" double-bill with Pagliacci by Ruggero Leoncavallo.

== Composition history ==
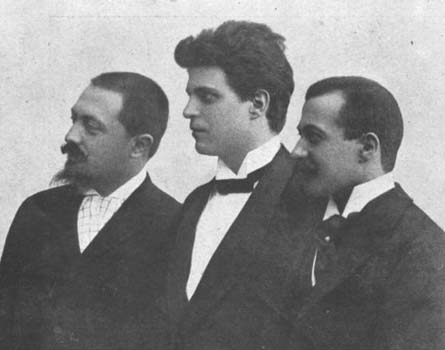
Mascagni (center) with his librettists, Giovanni Targioni-Tozzetti (left) and Guido Menasci

In July 1888 the Milanese music publisher Edoardo Sonzogno announced a competition open to all young Italian composers who had not yet had an opera performed on stage. They were invited to submit a one-act opera which would be judged by a jury of five prominent Italian critics and composers. The best three would be staged in Rome at Sonzogno's expense.

Mascagni heard about the competition only two months before the closing date and asked his friend Giovanni Targioni-Tozzetti, a poet and professor of literature at the Italian Royal Naval Academy in Livorno, to provide a libretto. Targioni-Tozzetti chose Cavalleria rusticana, a popular short story (and play) by Giovanni Verga, as the basis for the opera. He and his colleague Guido Menasci set about composing the libretto, sending it to Mascagni in fragments, sometimes only a few verses at a time on the back of a postcard. As Mascagni believed that the work was hastily written and not reflective of his best efforts, his courage deserted him and he placed the draft in a drawer, from where his wife, Argenide Marcellina "Lina" Mascagni, removed it and submitted it on the last day that entries would be accepted. In all, 73 operas were submitted, and on 5 March 1890, the judges selected the final three: Niccola Spinelli's Labilia, Vincenzo Ferroni's Rudello, and Mascagni's Cavalleria rusticana.

There have been two other operas based on Verga's story. The first, Mala Pasqua! (Bad Easter!) by Stanislao Gastaldon, was entered in the same competition as Mascagni's. However, Gastaldon withdrew it when he received an opportunity to have it performed at the Teatro Costanzi, where it premiered on 9 April 1890. In the 1907 Sonzogno competition, Domenico Monleone submitted an opera based on the story, and likewise called Cavalleria rusticana. The opera was not successful in the competition but premiered later that year in Amsterdam and went on to a successful tour throughout Europe, ending in Turin. Sonzogno, wishing to protect the lucrative property which Mascagni's version had become, took legal action and successfully had Monleone's opera banned from performance in Italy. Monleone changed the opera 'beyond recognition', setting the music to a new libretto. In this form it was presented as La giostra dei falchi in 1914.

== Performance history ==
=== Premiere ===
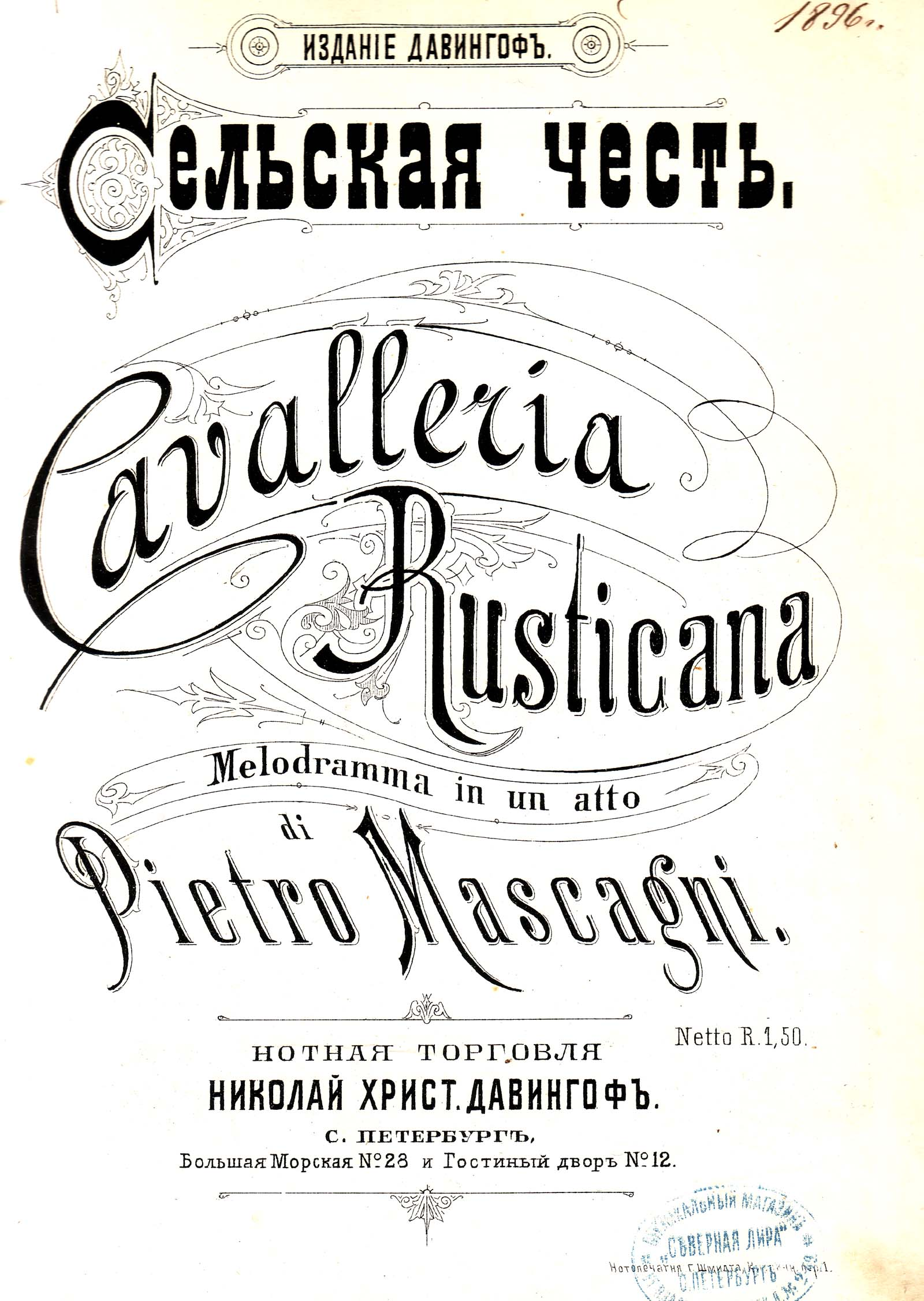
Russian edition of the Cavalleria rusticana script (1896)

Cavalleria rusticana opened on the evening of 17 May 1890 at the Teatro Costanzi in Rome to a half empty house. However, the audience included not only the most authoritative music critics in the country but also Queen Margherita, a great music lover. It was a success from its opening notes. Following Stagno's rendition of the Siciliana behind the curtain, the audience leapt to their feet with a thunderous applause not heard for many years. The Siciliana was encored as were several other numbers in the opera. It was a sensation, with Mascagni taking 40 curtain calls and winning the First Prize.

=== Subsequent performances ===
Although Mascagni had started writing two other operas earlier (Pinotta, premiered in 1932, and Guglielmo Ratcliff, premiered in 1895), Cavalleria rusticana was his first opera to be completed and performed. It remains the best known of his fifteen operas and one operetta (Sì). Apart from Cavalleria rusticana, only Iris and L'amico Fritz have remained in the standard repertory, with Isabeau and Il piccolo Marat on the fringes of the Italian repertoire. At the time of Mascagni's death in 1945, the opera had been performed more than 14,000 times in Italy alone.

In 1890, following its run of sold-out performances at the Teatro Costanzi, the opera was produced throughout Italy and in Berlin. Cavalleria Rusticana had its Western Hemisphere premiere at the Teatro Nacional in Buenos Aires on 28 February 1891, and a further run of performances at the Teatro de la Opera from 5 August 1891. It received its London premiere at the Shaftesbury Theatre on 19 October 1891 and its Covent Garden premiere on 16 May 1892.

American producers vied with each other (sometimes through the courts) to be the first to present the opera in their country. Cavalleria rusticana finally had its American premiere in Philadelphia at the Grand Opera House on 9 September 1891, followed by a performance in Chicago on 30 September 1891. The opera premiered in New York City on 1 October 1891, with two rival performances on the same day: an afternoon performance at the Casino, directed by Rudolph Aronson, and an evening performance at the Lenox Lyceum, directed by Oscar Hammerstein.

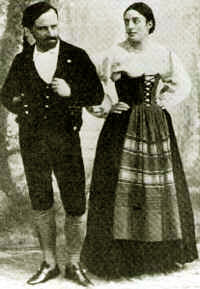
Gemma Bellincioni as Santuzza, and her husband, Roberto Stagno, as Turiddu, in the 1890 premiere of Cavalleria rusticana

The opera received its first performance at the Metropolitan Opera on 30 December 1891 in a double bill with a fragment of Gluck's Orfeo ed Euridice, and has since received over 700 performances there.

The opera was played during the 1920s in African-American theaters in Chicago. For example, the Vendome, featuring the orchestra of Erskine Tate, played music from this opera. Notably, Louis Armstrong performed and memorized the trumpet solo, coming out of the pit and mounting the stage to play it.

== Roles ==
Roles, voice types, premiere cast
Role	Voice type	Premiere cast, 17 May 1890 Conductor: Leopoldo Mugnone
Santuzza, a peasant girl	soprano or mezzo-soprano	Gemma Bellincioni
Turiddu, a young villager recently returned from the army	tenor	Roberto Stagno
Lucia, his mother	contralto	Federica Casali
Alfio, a carter	baritone	Gaudenzio Salassa
Lola, Alfio's wife	mezzo-soprano	Annetta Gulì

== Synopsis ==
Place: A 19th-century Sicilian village
Time: Easter morning

Before the action takes place, the young villager Turiddu returns from military service to find out that his fiancée, Lola, has married the carter Alfio while he was away. In revenge, Turiddu seduced Santuzza, a young woman in the village. As the opera begins, Lola, overcome by her jealousy of Santuzza, has begun an adulterous affair with Turiddu.

The main square of the village

Offstage, Turiddu is heard singing a siciliana, "O Lola ch'ai di latti la cammisa" ("O Lola, you whose blouse is as white as milk," commonly rendered in English as "O Lola! like the snow, pure in thy whiteness!"). To one side is the church; to the other is Lucia's wine shop and the house where she lives with her son, Turiddu. The villagers move about the square, singing of the beautiful spring day, "Gli aranci olezzano sui verdi margini" (literally, "Oranges smell good on the green edges," rendered as "The air is sweet with orange blossoms" in the English libretto) and a hymn to the Blessed Virgin Mary. Some villagers enter the church, and others wander off still singing.

Santuzza, having slept with Turiddu and suspecting that he has betrayed her for Lola, is distraught and approaches Lucia as she comes out of her house. Santuzza asks for Turiddu, but Lucia replies that he has gone to another town to fetch some wine. Santuzza tells her that he was seen during the night in the village. Lucia asks her inside to talk, but just at that moment, Alfio arrives on his wagon, accompanied by the villagers. He praises the joys of a teamster's life and the beauty of Lola his bride. Alfio asks Lucia for some of her fine old wine. She tells him it has run out and Turiddu has gone away to buy more. Alfio replies that he had seen Turiddu early that morning near his cottage. Lucia starts to express surprise, but Santuzza stops her.

Alfio leaves. The choir inside the church is heard singing the "Regina coeli". Outside, the villagers sing an Easter Hymn, "Inneggiamo, il Signor non è morto" ("Let us sing hymns, the Lord is not dead," or "We rejoice that our Saviour is living!" in the English version) joined by Santuzza. The villagers enter the church, while Santuzza and Lucia remain outside. Lucia asks Santuzza why she signalled her to remain silent when Alfio said that he had seen Turiddu that morning. Santuzza exclaims, "Voi lo sapete" ("You well know") and tells Lucia the story of her seduction by Turiddu and his affair with Lola. Lucia pities Santuzza, who feels dishonoured, having been seduced by Turiddu only to be abandoned by him for his old flame, Lola. Santuzza feels she cannot enter the church, but begs Lucia to go inside herself and pray for her. Santuzza stays behind to try to plead with Turiddu to leave Lola and return to her.

Santuzza pleads with Turiddu not to meet with Lola again

Turiddu arrives. Santuzza upbraids him for pretending to have gone away, when he was actually seeing Lola. Lola enters the square singing. She mocks Santuzza and goes inside the church. Turiddu turns to follow Lola, but Santuzza begs him to stay. Turiddu pushes her away. She clings to him. He loosens her hands, throws her to the ground, and enters the church. Alfio arrives looking for Lola. Santuzza tells him that his wife has betrayed him with Turiddu. Alfio swears to take vendetta (revenge) which causes Santuzza to repent for having disclosed the affair and begs Alfio to stop, but to no avail.

Cavalleria rusticana: Intermezzo sinfonico
Fulda Symphonic Orchestra

The square is empty as the orchestra plays the famous Intermezzo.

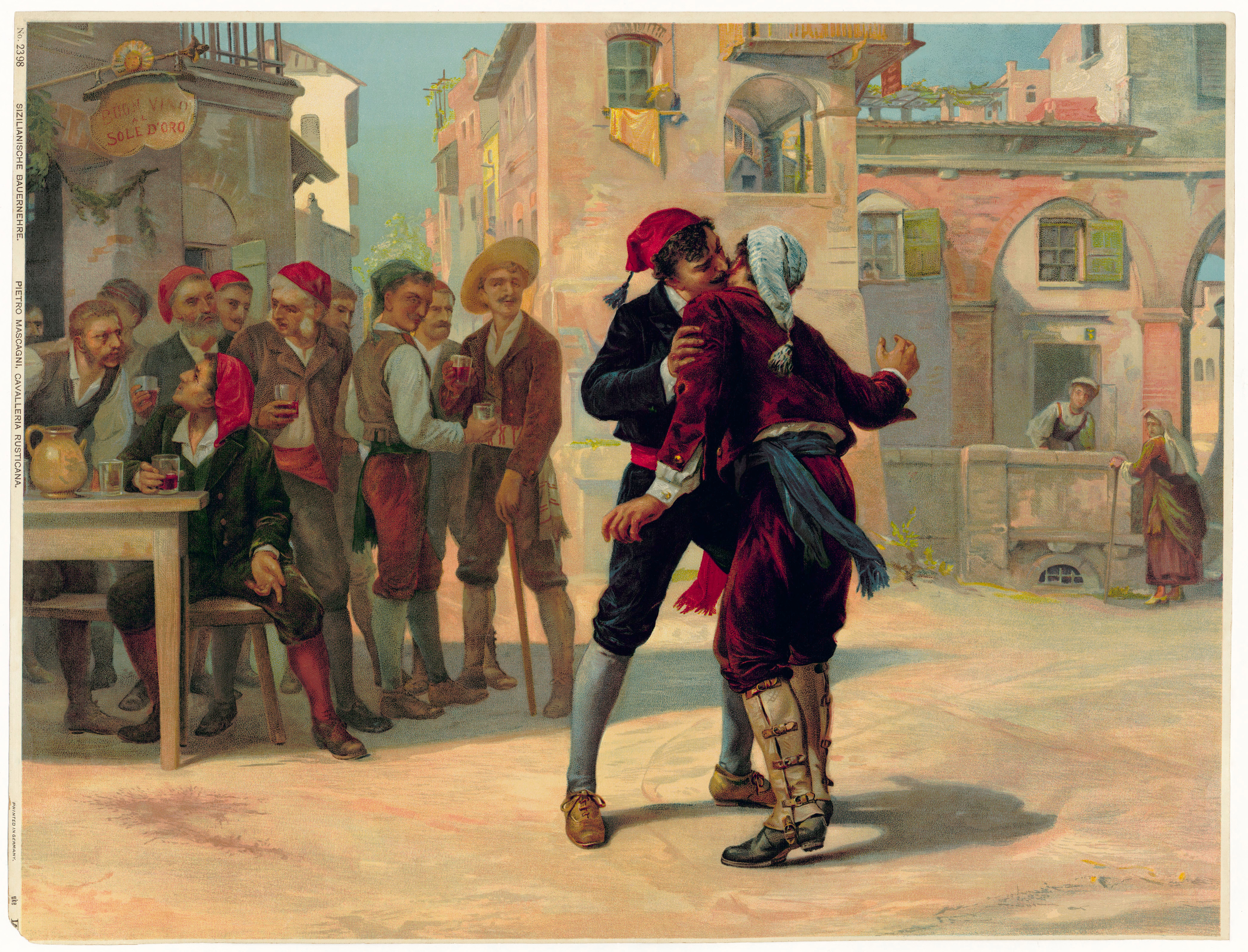
Turiddu bites Alfio's ear

The villagers come out of the church. Turiddu is in high spirits because he is with Lola, and Santuzza appears to have gone. He invites his friends to his mother's wine shop where he sings a drinking song, "Viva, il vino spumeggiante" ("Hail to the bubbling wine!"). Alfio joins them. Turiddu offers him wine, but he refuses it. All understand that trouble is in the air. The women leave, taking Lola with them. In a brief exchange of words, Alfio challenges Turiddu to a duel. Following Sicilian custom, the two men embrace, and Turiddu, in a token of acceptance, bites Alfio's ear, drawing blood which signifies a fight to the death. Alfio leaves and Turiddu calls Lucia back. He tells her that he is going outside to get some air and asks that she be a kindly mother to Santuzza if he should not return: "Un bacio, mamma! Un altro bacio!—Addio!" ("One kiss, mother! One more kiss! – Farewell!").

Turiddu rushes out. Lucia, weeping, wanders aimlessly around outside her house. Santuzza approaches and throws her arms around her. The villagers start to crowd around. Voices are heard in the distance and a woman cries, "They have murdered Turiddu!" Santuzza faints and Lucia collapses in the arms of the women villagers.

== Instrumentation ==
Mascagni calls for a standard-sized orchestra consisting of 2 flutes, 2 piccolos, 2 oboes, 2 clarinets, 2 bassoons, 4 horns, 2 trumpets, 3 trombones, tuba, timpani, percussion (triangle, cymbals, bass drum, side drum, tamtam, tubular bells), 2 harps, organ and strings.

== Recordings ==
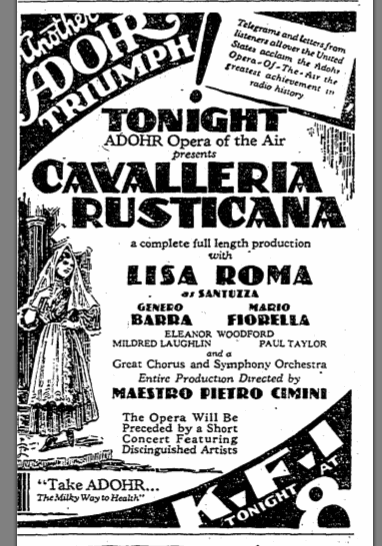
Advertisement for 1930 radio broadcast with Lisa Roma

There have been over 100 full-length recordings of Cavalleria rusticana published since it was first recorded in Germany in 1909. As in live performances of the opera, recordings of the work have often been paired with Ruggero Leoncavallo's Pagliacci. In addition to the original Italian, recordings of the work in the English, French, German, and Hungarian languages have been released. Mascagni himself conducted the opera in two recordings, the better-known of which is the 1940 EMI recording made to mark the 50th anniversary of the opera's premiere. The performance by the La Scala orchestra and chorus with Lina Bruna Rasa as Santuzza and Beniamino Gigli as Turiddu also has a spoken introduction by Mascagni. Originally released on 78 rpm discs, then an LP, it is available on CD under several historical recording labels.

== Radio ==
A double-bill performance of Cavalleria and Pagliacci was transmitted as the first broadcast by New York City's Metropolitan Opera on 11 December 1910. Radio pioneer Lee de Forest talked Giulio Gatti-Casazza, the Met manager, into sending the program over the airwaves by using a backstage radio transmitter and a rooftop antenna, "using a long fishing pole for his mast." Enrico Caruso and Emmy Destinn were in the leading roles.

Few listened. There were no radios. But public receivers had been set up in several well-advertised locations in New York City, and people could catch at least an inkling of the music on earphones. The next day, The New York Times reported that static and other interference "kept the homeless song waves from finding themselves."

In Los Angeles, an "Italian Night" concert was heard live "in its entirety" on May 6, 1930, as the third program of the Adohr opera series over radio station KFI, featuring "A distinguished cast ... headed by Lisa Roma, noted lyric soprano ... Music lovers should not fail to tune in."

Poster for the Carmine Gallone film version of Cavalleria rusticana (1953)

A notable use of the Intermezzo from Cavalleria rusticana in the United States was as the theme for a regular radio broadcast, Symphony of the Rockies, which featured "a small string group playing light classical music" in the 1930s and 1940s over Denver radio station KOA, then owned and operated by the NBC network. It "was a 'feed' to the entire network from the KOA studios."

== Film ==
Apart from video recordings of live performances, there have been several cinematic versions of Cavalleria rusticana, the most notable of which are:

- The 1916 silent film accompanied by Mascagni's score, directed by Ugo Falena, with Gemma Bellincioni, who had created the role of Santuzza in the opera's world premiere.
- The 1953 film directed by Carmine Gallone, using actors miming the voices of opera singers, with a young Anthony Quinn as Alfio miming to the voice of Tito Gobbi. (Released in the US in 1963 with the title Fatal Desire.)
- It was filmed for Australian television in 1959.
- The 1968 film directed by Åke Falck, with Fiorenza Cossotto as Santuzza, Gianfranco Cecchele as Turiddu, Giangiacomo Guelfi as Alfio and Anna di Stasio as Lucia. (La Scala, Milan conducted by Herbert von Karajan.)
- The 1982 film directed by Franco Zeffirelli, using opera singers for actors with Plácido Domingo as Turiddu, Elena Obraztsova as Santuzza, Renato Bruson as Alfio and Fedora Barbieri as Lucia.

Costumed excerpts from the opera are performed in Mario Lanza's popular films The Great Caruso (1951) and Because You're Mine (1952). The opera's symphonic Intermezzo has figured in the soundtrack of several films, most notably in the opening and closing credits of Raging Bull and in the finale of The Godfather Part III, which also featured a performance of the opera as a key part of the film's climax.

== Derivative works ==
The melody of the Intermezzo became very popular and it was not long before an adaptation was made to convert it into an Ave Maria. The text, in Italian, was set to music by Piero Mazzoni as a solo for a tenor or a soprano, along with other languages. Numerous arrangements and recordings were made, with highlights being Plácido Domingo, Joyce DiDonato, Angela Gheorghiu, Elīna Garanča, Andrea Bocelli and others.
