= Domenico Monleone =

Italian composer

Domenico Monleone (January 4, 1875 – 15 January 1942) was an Italian composer of operas, most noted for his opera Cavalleria rusticana of 1907, which for a while rivalled the success of Mascagni's work of the same name which was from the same source. The work was the third opera to be based on Verga's 1884 theatrical adaptation of his own short story, Cavalleria rusticana, Stanislao Gastaldon’s Mala Pasqua (1888) being the first, and Mascagni's famous opera (1890) being the second. Mascagni and his lawyers intervened and Monleone changed the opera ‘beyond recognition’ setting the music to a new libretto. In this form it was presented as La giostra dei falchi in 1914.

There have been recent revivals of Monleone's original Cavalleria rusticana in Tirana (Albania) and (more successfully) in Montpellier (France) in 2001. Also in Albania there has been (1998) a revival (radio concert) of Il mistero conducted by Daniel Pacitti which has been released on CD.

== Compositions ==
- Cavalleria rusticana, 2 May 1907, Amsterdam
- Una novella del Boccaccio, 26 May 1909, Genoa
- Alba eroica, 5 May 1910, Genoa
- Arabesca, 3 November 1913, Rome
- La giostra dei falchi - the music of Cavalleria rusticana (above) to a new libretto, 17 April 1914, Turin
- Suona la ritirata, 23 May 1916, Milan
- Fauvette, 3 February 1926, Genoa
- Il mistero, 7 May 1921, Venice, revised 1934, Turin
- Scheuggio Campanna, 1928, Genoa
- La ronda di notte del Rembrandt, 1933 Genoa
- Notte di nozze, 17 September 1940, Bergamo
