= Musica proibita =

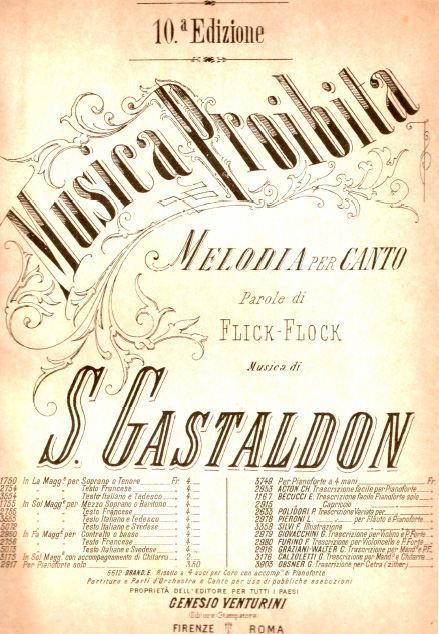
Cover of the 10th edition of "Musica proibita", Gastaldon's most enduring work

"Musica proibita" (English: Forbidden music) is an Italian salon song for solo voice and piano composed by Stanislao Gastaldon. Originally published in 1881, it uses lyrics by an unknown author who used the pen name Flick Flock. A romance, the song is written from the perspective of a young girl who in opposition to her mother would like to repeat the refrain of a love song that a handsome boy sings to her every evening, from under the balcony. It is one of the better-known songs of the romanza da salotto genre of Italian song that was popular in the late 19th and early 20th century. In its original printing, the piece sold 200,000 copies. The work has had enduring popularity internationally.

"Musica proibita" has been arranged for performance with orchestra multiple times by different arrangers. It has been recorded both in its original version with piano and in various chamber ensemble and orchestral versions by many different singers that encompass both high and low voices and singers from multiple genders. While not written specifically for the tenor voice, the song became closely associated with Enrico Caruso who made multiple recordings of the song in the early 20th century. The song later became associated with the tenor Mario Lanza who performed the song many times, including on a tribute album to Caruso in 1959. Lanza renewed a popularity for the song, particularly among tenors, and subsequent recordings were made by tenors Luciano Pavarotti, Placido Domingo, and José Carreras among others.

Women have also performed the song, with soprano Etelka Gerster being closely associated with the tune in the late 19th century. Early recordings were made by sopranos Luisa Ardizzoni-Tosi and Emma Eames, and contralto Ida Gardner. More recently, the song has been performed or recorded by Rosa Feola, Elīna Garanča, and Angela Gheorghiu.

== Text ==
The text of "Musica proibita" is written from the perspective of a young girl who would like to repeat the refrain of a love song that a handsome boy sings to her every evening, from under the balcony. This is forbidden by her mother, but the girl takes advantage of her absence and sings the aria and the words.

The following is the text attributed to Flick Flock for the song "Musica proibita" with an English language translation:

Ogni sera di sotto al mio balcone
Sento cantar una canzone d'amore,
Più volte la ripete un bel garzone
E battere mi sento forte il core.

Oh quanto è dolce quella melodia!
Oh com' è bella, quanto m' è gradita!

Ch'io la canti non vuol la mamma mia:
Vorrei saper perché me l'ha proibita?
Ella non c'è ed io la vo' cantare
La frase che m'ha fatto palpitare:

Vorrei baciare i tuoi capelli neri,
Le labbra tue e gli occhi tuoi severi,
Vorrei morir con te, angel di Dio,
O bella innamorata tesor mio.

Qui sotto il vidi ieri a passeggiare,
E lo sentiva al solito cantar:

Vorrei baciare i tuoi capelli neri,
Le labbra tue e gli occhi tuoi severi!
Stringimi, o cara, stringimi al tuo core,
Fammi provar l'ebbrezza dell'amor.

Every evening under my balcony
I hear a love song being sung,
A handsome boy repeats it many times
And I feel my heart beating strongly.

Oh how sweet that melody is!
Oh how beautiful it is, how pleasing it is to me!

My mother doesn't want me to sing it:
I would like to know why she forbade me?
She's not here and I want to sing it
The phrase that made me tremble:

I would like to kiss your black hair,
Your lips and your stern eyes,
I would like to die with you, angel of God,
O beautiful in love, my treasure.

I saw him down here yesterday walking,
And I heard him singing as usual:

I would like to kiss your black hair,
Your lips and your stern eyes!
Hold me tight, oh dear, hold me to your heart,
Let me experience the intoxication of love.

== History ==
Gastaldon composed "Musica proibita" in Turin in 1881 at the age of 20. The composer rapidly achieved fame thanks to this composition. The Florence and Rome based music publisher, Genesio Venturini, published the tune without a gender distinction in its marketing; labeling its lower key publication as a work for mezzo-soprano or baritone and its higher key version of the song as a piece for soprano or tenor. However, the female narrative perspective of the song's text also led to some music publishing companies specifically marketing "Musica proibita" as a song for women. In the United States Oliver Ditson's music publishing company published the composition in 1895 as a song specific to female voice types. The soprano Etelka Gerster, a well known early performer of the song, was featured prominently in the marketing of their sheet music, and it was published in two different keys, a higher version for sopranos and a lower one to accommodate both mezzo-sopranos and contraltos.

"Musica proibita" has been performed and recorded by many singers of various voice types. One of the earliest recordings was made by tenor Francesco Daddi who recorded the song in an unknown year in the first decade of the 20th century for Columbia Records; possibly as early as 1903. Multiple popular recordings of the song were made by tenor Enrico Caruso in the early 20th century, and he became closely associated with this song. Caruso recorded the song both in its original form with piano and in various orchestral arrangements. Soprano Luisa Ardizzoni-Tosi recorded the song with orchestra for the Victor Talking Machine Company in 1911. The song was also recorded by baritones Giuseppe Campanari (1909), Emilio de Gogorza (1913 and 1916), Inocencio Navarro (1920), and Renato Zanelli (1921); soprano Emma Eames (1911), contralto Ida Gardner (1916); bass Giovanni Morelli (1927), and tenors Alberto Amadi (1913), Umberto Sacchetti (1914), Umberto Baroni (1917), Mario Laurenti (1921), Beniamino Gigli (1930), Max de Schauensee (1935), and Carlo Buti (1939).

The Carisch Italian music publishing house published an orchestral arrangement of the song in 1928. This orchestral version of the work has been recorded several times. In 1937 tenor Nino Martini performed the song with an orchestra led by conductor Andre Kostelanetz on the radio program Chesterfield Presents which was broadcast in New York City on WABC (AM). In 1952 Mario Lanza performed the song with an orchestra conducted by Constantine Callinicos on his radio program The Mario Lanza Show. He later recorded the song on his 1959 album Lanza Sings Caruso's Favorites.

Tenor Placido Domingo recorded the song with the New York Philharmonic at Avery Fisher Hall in 1988, and the song was released by CBS Records International on his 1989 album Domingo at the Philharmonic. Tenor Luciano Pavarotti recorded the song for Decca Records using a new orchestral arrangement of the song by Henry Mancini. "Musica proibita" was also included on José Carreras's 1994 album With a Song in My Heart: A Tribute to Mario Lanza which he recorded live at Royal Albert Hall, London on March 15, 1994, with the BBC Concert Orchestra. Soprano Angela Gheorghiu recorded the song for Abbey Road Studios with pianist Antonio Pappano in 1997. Soprano Rosa Feola programmed the song in her 2014 recital at Wigmore Hall with Iain Burnside as her accompanist; a recital which was filmed. That same year tenor Vittorio Grigolo included the song in his recital at the Metropolitan Opera with Vincenzo Scalera as his accompanist.

More recently tenor Jonas Kaufmann recorded the song with orchestra on DVD and CD in a live recording made at the Waldbühne in 2019 for Sony Records (Jonas Kaufmann: An Italian Night - Live from the Waldbühne Berlin). That same year mezzo-soprano Elīna Garanča programmed the song in her concert at the Konzerthaus, Vienna.
