= Cavalleria rusticana (short story) =

- Short story by Giovanni Verga
- Language: Italian

Publication
- Published in: Novelle rusticane
- Publication date: 1883

Cavalleria rusticana
- Original language: Italian
- Genre: Tragedy

Premiere
- Date premiered: 1884
- Place premiered: Turin

"Cavalleria rusticana" (Italian for 'Rustic Chivalry') is a short story by the Sicilian Giovanni Verga, published in a collection entitled Novelle rusticane in 1883 and presented in dramatic form as a one-act tragedy at Turin in 1884. Pietro Mascagni made this prose play the basis of the verse-libretto of his one-act opera, Cavalleria rusticana (1890).

== Characters ==
- Turiddù Macca
- Lola
- Alfio
- Santuzza

== Plot ==
The scene is a Sicilian village in the 19th century leading up to Easter Day. Turiddù Macca, a young peasant, son of a widowed mother, was in love with the coquette, Lola, the daughter of Farmer Angelo. On his return from military service, he finds her soon to be married to Alfio, a wealthy carter from Licodia. Out of pique, he pays his addresses to Santa, the daughter of the wealthy farmer Cola, who falls desperately in love with him. Lola, annoyed that Turiddù should love anyone else, ensnares him again, and her husband's frequent absences enable them to meet at her house. Santa takes revenge on this abandonment by revealing the affair to Alfio, who has just returned from a journey, the relations of his wife, Lola, and Turiddù. The evening before Easter, Alfio finds Turiddù, ashamed to be seen in public and eating sausages with others in the village inn, and challenges him to a duel—a challenge which is sealed by the peasants' custom of embracing and biting the ear. After Turiddù gets a kiss from his mother, he and Alfio go out the next morning to battle among the fig-trees of Canziria. After Turiddù deals the first blow, Alfio takes retribution by throwing dust to blind his opponent, and Turiddù is slain.

== Appraisal ==
Helen Rex Keller writes, "The story both in its narrative and its dramatic form presents in lively colors the fierce passions and primitive customs of the Sicilian peasantry."

== Sources ==
- "Cavalleria rusticana". Encyclopædia Britannica. 4 September 2020. Retrieved 22 October 2022.

Attribution:

- Keller, Helen Rex (1924). "Cavalleria Rusticana". In The Reader's Digest of Books. The Library of the World's Best Literature. New York: The Macmillan Company. p. 131.
