= Elena Teodorini =

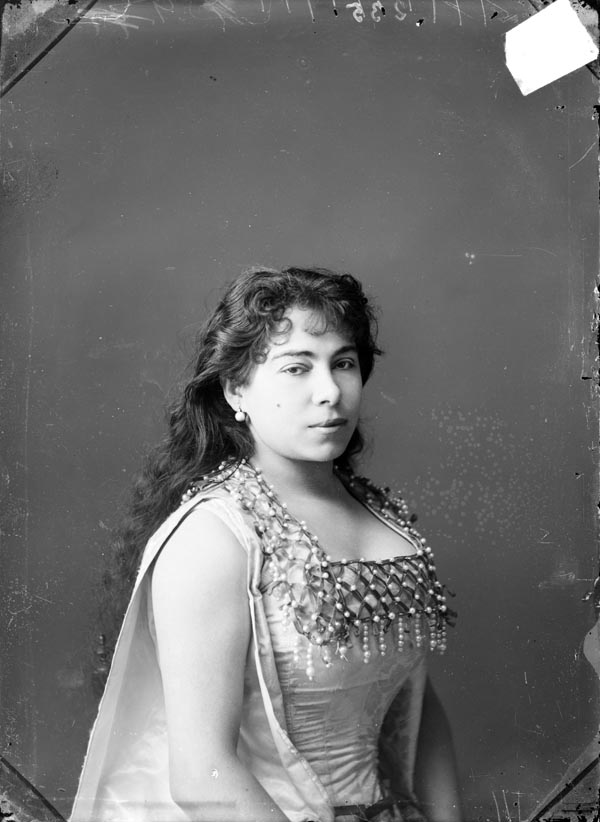
Elena Teodorini

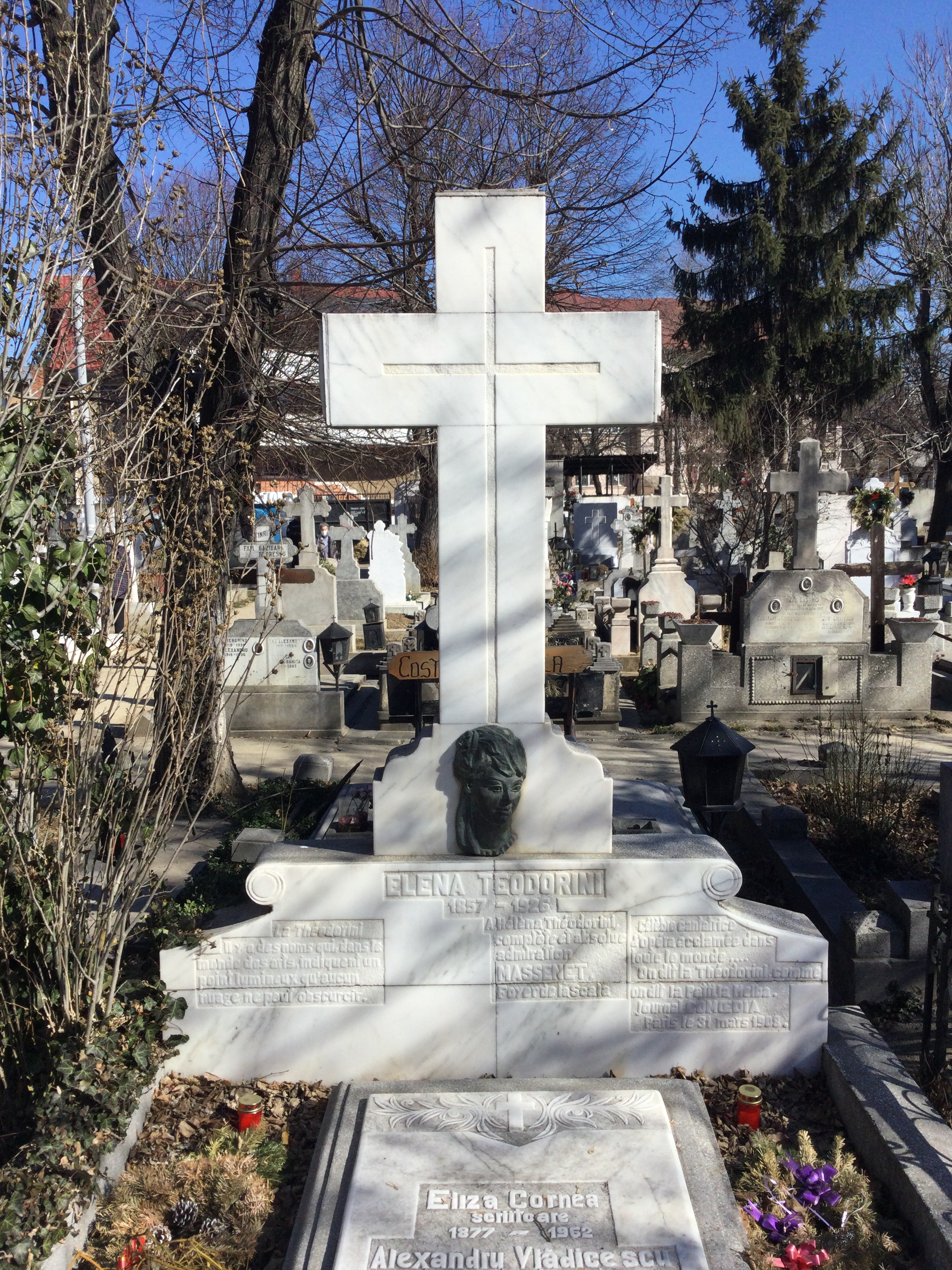
Grave at Sfânta Vineri Cemetery

Elena Teodorini (or Theodorini; née Ellen Morton or Monzunu; 25 March 1857 – 27 February 1926) was a Romanian soprano and mezzo-soprano.

== Biography ==
Born in Craiova, Principality of Wallachia, into a family of Romanian actors of Greek descent, she began to study singing and piano at the Milan Conservatory. She debuted as a mezzo-soprano in Cuneo, with Maria di Rohan. She then sang in theaters in provinces of Italy, as well as the Bucharest Opera. In 1879, she began her career as a soprano in La fille du regiment at the Teatro dal Verme in Milan. In 1880, she made her debut at La Scala in the role of Marguerite in Faust. She was the first Romanian singer to appear on stage at La Scala, and remained with the company until 1893. In 1884, she debuted at the Teatro Colon in Buenos Aires, next to Francesco Tamagno. At this time, her career focused on the soprano repertoire. In Europe, she performed in major Italian theaters, we well as in Lisbon, Madrid, and London. She was equally comfortable in dramatic or lyrical roles, mezzo-soprano or contralto, thanks to the exceptional extension of her voice. Her stage presence was characterized by a passionate and dramatic temperament.

In 1909, she founded a singing academy in Buenos Aires, while also teaching in Brazil. She returned to Romania in 1924, and began teaching at the conservatory in Bucharest and in Athens. Among her students were Bidu Sayão and Nicola Moscona.

Theodorini died in 1926 in Bucharest and was buried in the city's Sfânta Vineri Cemetery.

== Bibliography ==
- Viorel Cosma, "Elena Theodorini", Editura Muzicală, București 1962
- Rodolfo Celletti, "Teodorini Elena", Le Grandi Voci, Dizionario Critico Biografico Dei Cantati con Discografia Operatica, Roma 1964
- Roland Mancini and Jean-Jacques Rouveroux, (orig. H. Rosenthal and J. Warrack, French édition), Guide de l’opéra, Les indispensables de la musique (Fayard, 1995). ISBN 2-213-01563-5
- Lanfranco Rasponi, The Last Prima Donnas, Bidú Sayão, Alfred A. Knopf, 1982, p. 507. ISBN 0-394-52153-6
