= Stanislao Gastaldon =

Italian composer (1861–1939)

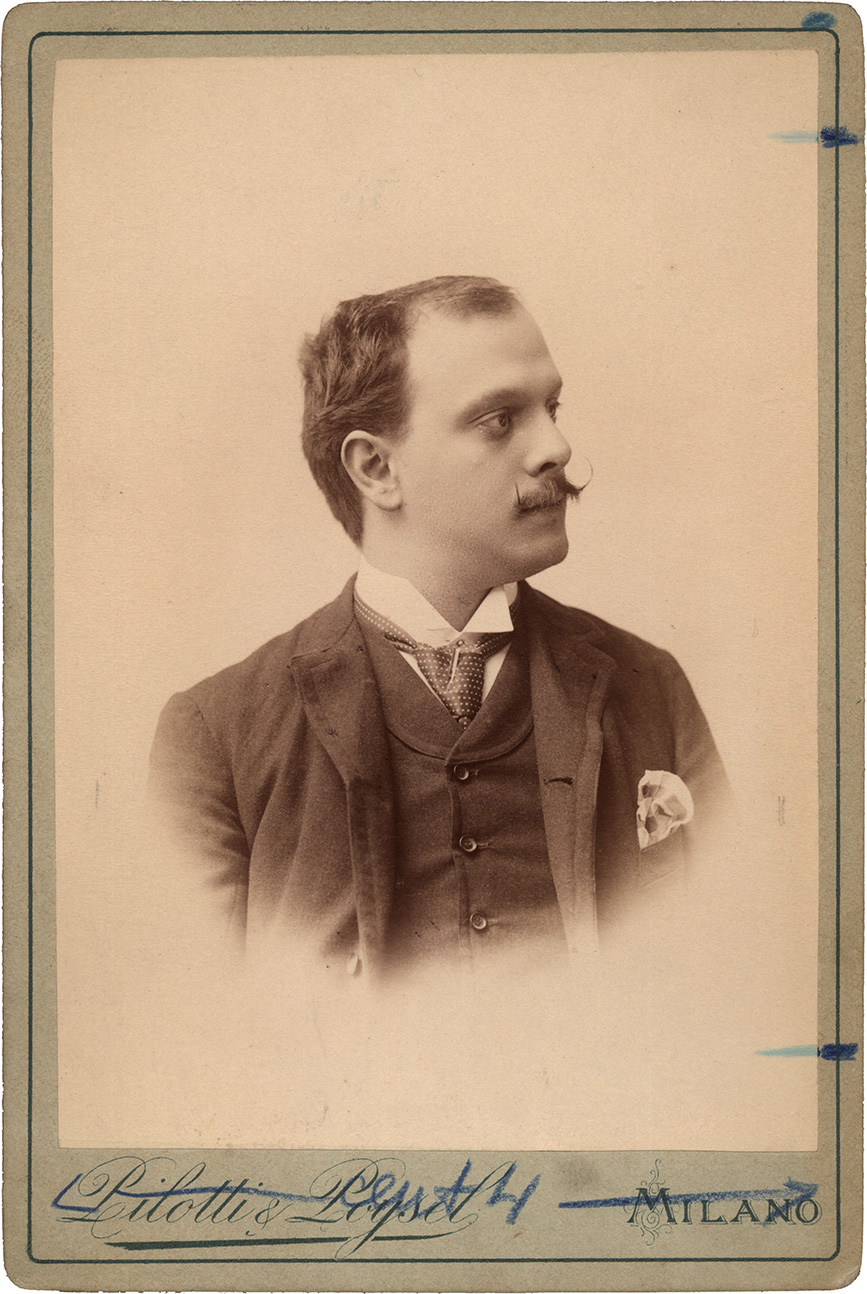
Stanislao Gastaldon

Martino Stanislao Luigi Gastaldon (8 April 1861 – 6 March 1939) was an Italian composer, primarily of salon songs for solo voice and piano. However, he also composed instrumental music, two choral works, and four operas. Today, he is remembered almost exclusively for his 1881 song "Musica proibita" ("Forbidden Music"), still one of the most popular pieces of music in Italy. Gastaldon also wrote the lyrics for some of his songs, including "Musica proibita", under the pseudonym Flick-Flock. He was born in Turin and after a peripatetic childhood studied music there and in Florence. By 1900, he had settled permanently in Florence, where he died at the age of 77. In his later years, he also worked as a voice teacher, music critic, and art dealer.

== Life and career ==
Gastaldon was born in Turin on 8 April 1861 to Luigi Gastaldon and Luigia Grazioli. His father was an engineer from Lerino, a village near Torri di Quartesolo in the Veneto region of Italy. His mother was a Roman noblewoman who had married a wealthy landowner, Count Bernardo Genardini, at the age of 16. She met Luigi Gastaldon in 1854 when she was 23 and shortly thereafter abandoned her husband and four children to live with him. The family moved from one Italian city to another during Gastaldon's childhood and early youth while his father worked on a series of engineering projects. Part of his childhood was spent in San Vito Chietino in the Abruzzo region, where a street is now named for him and where his younger brother Guglielmo was born in 1864.

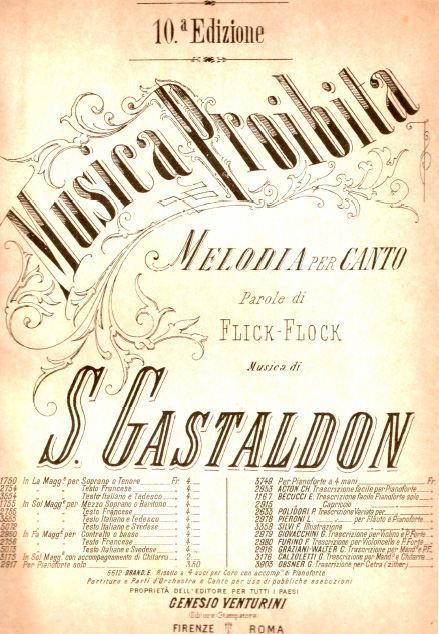
Cover of the 10th edition of "Musica proibita", Gastaldon's most enduring work

Gastaldon studied music with the Turinese composer Antonio Creonti and with Torquato Meliani, an organist at the Florence Cathedral, as well as studying literature at the University of Florence. He began composing songs at the age of 17, sometimes writing the lyrics himself under the pseudonym of "Flick-Flock". Although it is not known for sure why Gastaldon chose "Flick-Flock", Italian musicologist Maria Scaccetti suggests that it probably derived from the popular ballet, Flick und Flock by Peter Ludwig Hertel, which had been performed at La Scala in 1861. Music from the ballet arranged as a military march became the official fanfare of the 12th Regiment of the Bersaglieri corps, which had been based in Turin. Gastaldon was only 20 when the Florentine firm Venturini published his song "Musica proibita", which made his name as a composer and achieved an enduring popularity. Its success would also provide an entry to the most important salons in Italy, where many of his early songs were first performed. His musical fame preceded him when Gastaldon did his obligatory year of military service in 1883. He was assigned to be one of the "professors" of the 24th Infantry Regiment band.

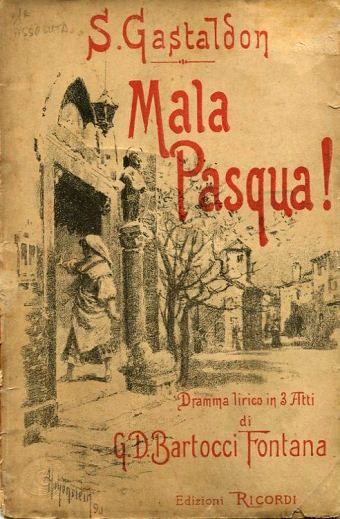
Libretto for Gastaldon's forgotten opera, Mala Pasqua!, 1890

When his military service ended, Gastaldon returned to Rome, where his parents were living at the time. Over the next four years, he continued composing songs and short pieces of instrumental music and started work on his first opera, Fatma. However, in 1888, when the music publisher Sonzogno announced a competition for one-act operas, Gastaldon decided to enter with Mala Pasqua!, a setting of Giovanni Verga's popular short story (and later play), Cavalleria rusticana. Another young composer, Pietro Mascagni, entered the same contest with his opera Cavalleria rusticana, also based on Verga's story. Gastaldon withdrew his work early in the competition when he received an offer from Sonzogno's rival, Ricordi, to publish it and arrange a premiere at the Teatro Costanzi in Rome. He expanded the opera to three acts, and Mala Pasqua! premiered on 9 April 1890 to modest success. Mascagni's opera eventually won the competition and premiered a month later on 17 May at the same theatre. Mascagni's work was an enormous success and completely eclipsed Gastaldon's. Nevertheless, he continued writing operas over the years, producing two one-act operas, Pater (1894) and Stellina (1905) and a three-act comic opera, Il Reuccio di Caprilana (1915). Like Mala Pasqua!, they premiered to moderate success but dropped almost immediately from the repertoire.

Stanislao Gastaldon circa 1903

After the premiere of Mala Pasqua! in 1890, Gastaldon lived in Orvieto for a time and then settled in Florence, where he was to spend the rest of his life. There, in addition to composing, he taught singing and worked as a music critic for the Florentine paper Nuovo Giornale, as well as writing a column "Scattola Armonica" ("Music Box") for the children's periodical Il giornalino della Domenica. His associates in Florence were a circle of free-thinking artists and literary figures who gathered at the Gambrinus Halle café in the Piazza Vittorio Emanuele (now called the Piazza della Repubblica). Gastaldon and his friends were out of sympathy with the rise of Italian Fascism in the 1920s, and he became increasingly marginalised. Finding it difficult to make a living solely from his music, in the final years of his life he also worked as an art dealer, buying and selling paintings by his friends in the Gambrinus Halle. He never married and lived alone in his house on Via Montanara. On 6 March 1939, Gastaldon suffered a heart attack while walking across the Piazza Vittorio Emanuele and died the same day at the age of 77. He is buried in the Misericordia di Antella Cemetery near Florence.

== Works ==
During his lifetime, the vast majority of Gastaldon's works were published by two firms, Genasio Venturini in Florence (absorbed by Carisch & Jänichen in 1905) and Ricordi in Milan. Although several biographical entries, including that in Enciclopedia della musica published by Rizzoli-Ricordi, say that he composed more than 300 songs, Scaccetti suggests that while Gastaldon was prolific, the actual number may be considerably less than this. The work he is almost exclusively remembered for today is his song "Musica proibita".

=== "Musica proibita" ===
"Musica proibita" (Forbidden Music) is a song within a song. A young woman tells of a handsome young man ("un bel garzone") who sings a love song beneath her balcony every night. She longs to sing it herself to re-live the thrill she felt, but her mother has forbidden her. Knowing that her mother has left the house, she sings it, and then recalling the last time she heard him, she sings it again even more intensely. The young man's song begins:

Vorrei baciare i tuoi capelli neri,
Le labbra tue e gli occhi tuoi severi...

I want to kiss your raven hair,
Your lips and your solemn eyes...

A common misconception about the song's origin is that it is an aria from Gastaldon's opera, Mala Pasqua!, and the only surviving piece from the work. In fact, it is neither. It was published as a salon song for solo soprano and piano in 1881, nine years before Mala Pasqua! premiered. The Mala Pasqua! score (and the libretto) were published by Ricordi in 1890 and copies are held in several libraries in the United States and Europe. Dedicated to the Italian baritone Felice Giachetti, "Musica proibita" was Gastaldon's second published work, and the first of six songs for which he also wrote the lyrics using the pseudonym "Flick-Flock". Its success was enormous. Ten years later, a journalist writing in the Gazzetta musicale di Milano recalled how the song soon became a way for timid young lovers all over Italy to express their affection in words that were both uninhibited and emotionally moving. He went on:

What an invasion, what an inundation, how deafening it was back then! In every house, in every street, in every café, everyone wanted to kiss their raven hair, in every style and in every possible way of singing out of tune.

Shortly after its publication in Italy, "Musica proibita" was published in English as "Unspoken Words" (with a text by D'Arcy Jaxone) and in French as "La chanson défendue". It has since been arranged for every voice type as well as transcribed for flute and violin, violin solo, piano solo, guitar, mandolin, accordion, military band, and solo voice and orchestra. It was recorded in several different versions on early gramophone and cylinder recordings starting in 1900, and although the words express the thoughts of a young girl, "Musica proibita" became a staple of the tenor concert repertoire (sometimes with the text adjusted). Among the tenors who have recorded it over the years are Enrico Caruso in 1917, Beniamino Gigli in 1933, Richard Tauber in 1936, Aureliano Pertile, Mario Del Monaco, Mario Lanza in 1952 and 1959, Giuseppe Di Stefano in 1961, Luciano Pavarotti in 1984, Plácido Domingo, José Carreras (who also sang it in several Three Tenors concerts) in 1979 and 1993, Andrea Bocelli in 2002, and Christian Ketter in 2014. "Musica proibita" was also the inspiration, title, and theme song of a 1943 Italian film directed by Carlo Campogalliani and starring Tito Gobbi, a tortuous story of a noblewoman who opposes the marriage of her niece to the son of a famous baritone who had once been the noblewoman's "forbidden love".

First edition of the score for "Amor non è peccato", dedicated to Leonora Genina Mancini

=== Other songs ===
In 1882, Gastaldon wrote "Ti vorrei rapire" (I want to carry you away), a sequel to "Musica proibita" which is meant to be sung by the young man referred to in the original song. Like "Musica probita", the text was by "Flick-Flock". It had considerable success in its day and was recorded in 1910 by the Italian baritone Taurino Parvis for Columbia Records. A variation on the theme came in 1885 with Gastaldon's "Musica non probita!" (Music not forbidden!) composed to a text by the theatre critic and poet Luigi Bevacqua Lombardo. Two of Gastaldon's other early songs, "Amor non è peccato" (Love is not a sin) and "Fiori di sposa" (Bridal flowers) were set to texts by a poet identified only as "Faustina". The first of these was dedicated to Leonora Genina Mancini, daughter of the Italian statesman Pasquale Stanislao Mancini and the poet Laura Beatrice Mancini. Leonora's younger sister Flora ran a famous musical salon, and both sisters wrote poems that had been set by Gastaldon's contemporaries.

Giovanni Domenico Bartocci-Fontana, who wrote the libretto for Gastaldon's opera Mala Pasqua!, also wrote the text for his song "Perché tacete" (Why are you silent?). Other poets whose texts were set by Gastaldon included Gustavo Adolfo Bécquer, Olindo Guerrini (under the pseudonym Lorenzo Stecchetti), Emilio Praga, Armando Perotti, Annie Vivanti, Fausto Salvatori, and Domenico Milelli (under the pseudonym Conte di Lara). Of all his songs, Gastaldon's favourite was reportedly "Mamma", dedicated to the memory of his mother, with lyrics by the poet and playwright Giovanni Arrighi. It was recorded by Renato Zanelli for the Victor Talking Machine Company in 1921. In a departure from his usual genre of songs for solo voice and piano, Gastaldon also wrote two choral pieces, "Viva il Re" and "Inno della Dante Alighieri". The patriotic anthem "Viva il Re" (Long Live the King) with text by Giosuè Carducci was published by Ricordi 1915. "Inno della Dante Alighieri" with text by Augusto Franchetti was written as an anthem for the Dante Alighieri Society. It was first performed on 28 September 1902 in the Piazza del Campo in Siena for the XIII Congress of the Società Dante Alighieri and published the following year by the Florentine firm of Bemporad & Figlio.

=== Stage works ===
Although Mala Pasqua was the first of Gastaldon's operas to be performed, he had previously composed Fatma, an opera-ballet in four acts and a prologue with a libretto by Marco Praga. According to The Monthly Musical Record of 1887, it had been accepted for performance at La Scala and in 1888, the French periodical Le Ménestrel reported that it was nearly finished. However, it was never performed and does not appear to have been published. In 1891, after the premiere of Mala Pasqua!, he began work on what was to have been a three-act comedy loosely based on the Alexandre Dumas novel Twenty Years After. Initially called Rosa Minchon and then Mazzarinata, it too was never performed and was probably never finished. Although not an opera, and lasting only seven minutes, Gastaldon's Il sonetto di Dante, a setting of Dante's sonnet "Tanto gentile e tanto onesta pare", was written to be performed on stage by a tenor in the role of Dante, surrounded by scenery depicting 14th century Florence. According to the Revue musicale de Lyon, it had little success despite the talent of Giuseppe Taccani, who sang the piece at its premiere.

Chronological list of performed stage works

- Mala Pasqua! – opera in three acts; libretto by Giovanni Domenico Bartocci-Fontana based on Verga's short story, "Cavalleria rusticana"; premiered 9 April 1890 at the Teatro Costanzi in Rome
- Pater – opera in one act; libretto by Vittorio Bianchi based on François Coppée's play of the same name; premiered 15 April 1894 at the Teatro Manzoni in Milan
- Stellina – opera in one act; libretto by Vittorio Bianchi; published 1896, premiered 25 March 1905 in a double bill with Pater at the Teatro Niccolini in Florence
- Il sonetto di Dante – described as a visione scenica; text by Dante Alighieri from La Vita Nuova, "Tanto gentile e tanto onesta pare"; premiered 17 November 1906 at the Politeama Genovese in Genoa
- Il Reuccio di Caprilana – operetta in three acts; libretto by Félicien Champsaur; premiered 4 April 1914 at the Teatro Balbo in Turin

== Notes and references ==
=== Sources ===
- Almanacco Italiano (1903). "Musica: S. Gastaldon". Roberto Bemporad & Figlio, p. 53 (in Italian)
- American Record Guide (1991). "Review: Italian baritones of the Acoustic era (Bongiovanni GB1043)". Volume 54, Issues 1–3, p. 158
- Chiti, Roberto; Lancia, Enrico (2005). "Musica Proibita". Dizionario del cinema italiano. I film (in Italian). Vol. 1. Gremese Editore. pp. 229–230. ISBN 88-8440-351-0.
- Gramophone (February 1934). "Review: Beniamino Gigli – Forbidden Music (Gastaldon) HMV DB1385", p. 37
- Guerrini, Silvano (2007). "Storia del Cimitero Misericordia di Antella" (in Italian). Venerabile Confraternita della Misericordia di Antella.
- La nuova fioritura (1915). "Fausto Villa". Renzo Streglio & Co., p. 105 (in Italian)
- "Nouvelles Diverses: Étranger". Le Ménestrel (in French). Heugel. 6 May 1888. pp. 148–150 – via Gallica.
- Limongi, Riccardo (1999). Sensi unici ovvero la ghirlanda (in Italian). Guida Editori. ISBN 88-7188-204-0.
- "Le Dante en musique". Revue musicale de Lyon (in French). 16 December 1906. pp. 315–316 – via Gallica.
- Rubboli, Daniele (March 1989). "Vorrei baciare i tuoi capelli neri...". L'Opera (in Italian). pp. 70–71.
- Sartori, Claudio, ed. (1972). "Gastaldon, Stanislao". Enciclopedia della musica (in Italian). Vol. 3. Rizzoli-Ricordi. p. 94.
- Sbrocchi, Vito (18 April 2003). "Il compositore Gastaldon, celebre alla fine dell'Ottocento, trascorse l'infanzia a San Vito". Il Tempo (in Italian).
- Scaccetti, Maria Paola (2002). "'La Musica Proibita' di Stanislao Gastaldon". In Francesco Sanvitale (ed.). La romanza italiana da salotto (in Italian). EDT srl. ISBN 88-7063-615-1.
- The Monthly Musical Record (1887). Vol. 17. Augener & Co, p. 70
